= List of compositions by Michael Tippett =

The compositional career of the British composer Michael Tippett extended over eight decades, from juvenilia and unpublished works written in the 1920s to his final works of the 1990s. He composed across many genres, from large-scale orchestral works and full-length operas to solo songs and brass band fanfares. From the mid-1930s his music began to be published and performed publicly. The main list is restricted to published and publicly performed works; a subsidiary list gives details of unpublished pieces, some of which may have been privately performed.

== Published works ==
=== Opera ===
| Date of composition | Title | Musical forces | First performance details | Notes | Ref. |
|---|---|---|---|---|---|
| 1946–52 | The Midsummer Marriage | Voices and orchestra | 27 January 1955: London. Royal Opera House cond. John Pritchard | Opera in three acts. Libretto by composer. See also "Ritual Dances from The Midsummer Marriage" in orchestral works | |
| 1958–61 | King Priam | Voices and orchestra | 29 May 1962: Coventry. Coventry Theatre. Royal Opera House chorus & orch. cond. John Pritchard | Opera in three acts. Libretto by composer. | |
| 1966–69 | The Knot Garden | Voices and orchestra | 2 December 1970: London. Royal Opera House cond. Colin Davis | Opera in three acts. Libretto by composer. | |
| 1973–76 | The Ice Break | Voices and orchestra | 7 July 1977: London. Royal Opera House cond. Colin Davis | Opera in three acts. Libretto by composer. | |
| 1985–88 | New Year | Voices and orchestra | 27 October 1989: Houston, Texas. Houston Grand Opera cond. John DeMain | Opera in three acts. Libretto by composer. Orchestral Suite 1989. | |

=== Orchestral ===
| Date of composition | Title | Musical forces | First performance details | Notes | Ref. |
|---|---|---|---|---|---|
| 1938–39 | Concerto for Double String Orchestra | Orchestra | 21 April 1940: London. South London Orchestra (Morley College) cond. Michael Tippett | Dedicated "to Jeffrey Mark" | |
| 1944–45 | Symphony No. 1 | Orchestra | 10 November 1945: Liverpool. Liverpool Philharmonic Orchestra cond. Malcolm Sargent | | |
| 1946 | Little Music for Strings | String Orchestra | 9 November 1946: London. Jacques Orchestra cond. Reginald Jacques | Written for 10th anniversary of Jacques String Orchestra | |
| 1948 | Suite in D: Birthday Suite for Prince Charles | Orchestra | 15 November 1948: London. BBC broadcast, BBC Symphony Orchestra cond. Sir Adrian Boult | BBC commission to mark Prince Charles's birth. Revised in 1983 by Brian Bowen | |
| 1952 | Ritual Dances from The Midsummer Marriage | Orchestra and optional chorus | 13 February 1953: Basel. Basler Kammerorchester cond. Paul Sacher | Dedicated "to Walter Goehr" | |
| 1953 | Variations on an Elizabethan Theme (Composite work: second variation, "Lament" by Tippett) | Small Orchestra | 16 June 1953: London. BBC broadcast, orchestra cond. Benjamin Britten | Variations by six composers. First public performance Aldeburgh Festival, 20 June 1953 | |
| 1953 | Fantasia Concertante on a Theme of Corelli | String orchestra | 29 August 1953: Edinburgh. BBC Symphony Orchestra cond. Michael Tippett | Edinburgh Festival celebration of tercentenary of birth of Arcangelo Corelli | |
| 1953–54 | Divertimento on Sellinger's Round | Chamber orchestra | 5 November 1954: Zürich. Collegium Musicum Zürich cond. Paul Sacher | Commissioned by, and dedicated to, Paul Sacher | |
| 1956–57 | Symphony No. 2 | Orchestra | 5 February 1958: London. BBC Symphony Orchestra cond. Sir Adrian Boult | Dedicated "to John Minchinton" | |
| 1962 | Incidental music for The Tempest | Chamber Orchestra | 29 May 1962: London. Old Vic production; music directed by John Lambert | | |
| 1962–63 | Concerto for Orchestra | Orchestra | 28 August 1963: Edinburgh. London Symphony Orchestra cond. Colin Davis | Written in celebration of Benjamin Britten's 50th birthday and dedicated to him | |
| 1966 | "Braint" (last of Severn Bridge Variations, a composite work) | Orchestra | 12 January 1967: Swansea. BBC Training Orchestra cond Sir Adrian Boult | One of 7 variations on a trad. Welsh melody, each by a different composer | |
| 1970–72 | Symphony No. 3 | Soprano and orchestra | 22 June 1972: London. Heather Harper, London Symphony Orchestra cond. Colin Davis | Dedicated "to Howard Hartog" | |
| 1976–77 | Symphony No. 4 | Orchestra | 6 October 1977: Chicago. Chicago Symphony Orchestra cond. Sir Georg Solti | Dedicated "to Ian Kemp" | |
| 1988 | Water Out of Sunlight | Orchestra | 15 June 1988: London. Academy of St Martin in the Fields cond. Neville Marriner | Orchestral arrangement by Meirion Bowen of String Quartet No. 4 (1977–78) | |
| 1991–93 | The Rose Lake | Orchestra | 19 February 1995: London. London Symphony Orchestra cond. Colin Davis | Premiered at a Tippett 90th birthday celebration concert | |

=== Concertante ===
| Date of composition | Title | Musical forces | First performance details | Notes | Ref. |
|---|---|---|---|---|---|
| 1939–41 | Fantasia on a Theme of Handel | Piano and orchestra | 7 March 1942: London. Phyllis Sellick, London Symphony Orchestra cond. Walter Goehr | Dedicated "to Phyllis Sellick" | |
| 1953–55 | Piano Concerto | Piano and orchestra | 30 October 1956: Birmingham. Louis Kentner, City of Birmingham Symphony Orchestra cond. Rudolf Schwarz | Dedicated "to Evelyn Maude" | |
| 1978–79 | Triple concerto for violin, viola and cello | Violin, viola, cello and orchestra | 22 August 1980: London. György Pauk, Nobuko Imai, Ralph Kirshbaum, London Symphony Orchestra cond. Colin Davis | Dedicated "to Herbert and Betty Barrett" | |

=== Choral ===
| Date of composition | Title | Musical forces | First performance details | Notes | Ref. |
|---|---|---|---|---|---|
| 1939–41 | Oratorio: A Child of Our Time | SATB soloists, choir and orchestra | 19 March 1944: London. Joan Cross, Margaret MacArthur, Peter Pears, Roderick Lloyd, London Regional Civil Defence Choir, Morley College Choir, London Philharmonic Orchestra cond. Walter Goehr | Text by Michael Tippett, who in 1958 arranged the five spirituals for unaccompanied chorus. | |
| 1942 | Two Madrigals for unaccompanied chorus: "The Source" and "The Windhover" | SATB chorus | 17 July 1943: London. Morley College Choir cond. Walter Bergmann | Settings of poems by Edward Thomas and Gerard Manley Hopkins | |
| 1943–44 | Motet: Plebs Angelica | Double choir | 16 September 1944: Canterbury. Fleet Street Choir cond. T. B. Lawrence | Commissioned by Canterbury Cathedral and dedicated to the cathedral's choir | |
| 1944 | Motet: The Weeping Babe | Soprano and SATB choir | 24 December 1944: London. BBC broadcast, BBC Singers cond. Leslie Woodgate | Setting of poem by Edith Sitwell. Dedicated "in memory of Bronwen Wilson" | |
| 1956 | Four Songs from the British Isles: "Early One Morning"; "Lillibullero"; "Poortith cauld"; "Gwenllian" | Unaccompanied SATB chorus | 6 July 1958: Royaumont Abbey, France. London Bach Group cond. John Minchinton | Performed at the 1958 Royaumont Festival | |
| 1956 | "Over The Sea To Skye" | Unaccompanied SATB chorus | 31 July 2003: Dublin. National Chamber Choir of Ireland conducted by Celso Antunes | Work lost after 1956, rediscovered 2002 | |
| 1958 | Cantata: Crown of the Year | SSA chorus; recorders or flutes, oboe, clarinet, cornet or trumpet, string quartet, percussion, handbells and piano | 25 July 1958: Bristol. Badminton School choir and ensemble, cond. Michael Tippett | Composed for the Badminton School centenary | |
| 1958 | Hymn tune: Wadhurst (setting for "Unto the hills around", by John Campbell) | | | Written at the request of The Salvation Army | |
| 1960 | "Music" (Shelley poem) | Unison voices, strings and piano (or voices and strings) | 26 April 1960: Tunbridge Wells. Choirs of East Sussex and West Kent Choral Festival, cond. Trevor Harvey | | |
| 1961 | Magnificat and Nunc Dimittis | SATB chorus and organ | 13 March 1962: Cambridge. St John's College Chapel Choir cond. George Guest | Composed for the 450th anniversary of the foundation of St John's College, Cambridge | |
| 1962–65 | The Vision of Saint Augustine | Baritone solo, chorus and orchestra | 19 January 1966: London. Dietrich Fischer-Dieskau, BBC Chorus, BBC Symphony Orchestra cond. Michael Tippett | Commissioned by BBC | |
| 1965–70 | The Shires Suite | Chorus and orchestra | 8 July 1970: Cheltenham. Schola Cantorum of Oxford, Leicestershire Schools Symphony Orchestra cond. Michael Tippett | Written for the Leicestershire Schools Symphony Orchestra | |
| 1980–82 | Oratorio: The Mask of Time | SATB soloists, chorus and orchestra | 5 April 1984: Boston. Faye Robinson, Yvonne Minton, Robert Tear, John Cheek, Tanglewood Festival Chorus, Boston Symphony Orchestra cond. Colin Davis | Commissioned for 100th anniversary of the Boston Symphony Orchestra | |

=== Vocal ===
| Date of composition | Title | Musical forces | First performance details | Notes | Ref. |
|---|---|---|---|---|---|
| 1943 | Cantata: Boyhood's End | Tenor and piano | 5 June 1943: London. Peter Pears (tenor), Benjamin Britten (piano) | Text by W. H. Hudson | |
| 1950–51 | Song cycle: The Heart's Assurance | Solo high voice and piano | 7 May 1951: London. Peter Pears (tenor) and Benjamin Britten (piano) | Setting of poems by Sidney Keyes and Alun Lewis. Dedicated "in memory of Francesca Allinson (1902–45)" | |
| 1952 | Madrigal for five voices: "Dance, Clarion Air" | Two sopranos, alto, tenor, bass | 1 June 1953: London. Golden Age Singers and the Cambridge University Madrigal Society cond. Boris Ord | Text by Christopher Fry. From A Garland for the Queen, a collection of madrigals by various composers, marking the coronation of Queen Elizabeth II | |
| 1956 | Bonny at Morn (folksong arrangement) | Unison voices, recorder accompaniment | April 1956 | Written for 10th anniversary of the International Pestalozzi Children's Village at Trogen | |
| 1959 | Lullaby for Six Voices | Six voices, alternately for alto solo and small SSTTB choir | 31 January 1960: London. Deller Consort | Written for the Deller Consort's 10th anniversary | |
| 1960 | Words for Music Perhaps | Speaking voice and chamber ensemble | 8 June 1960: London. BBC broadcast, ensemble conducted by Michael Tippett | Poem by W. B. Yeats | |
| 1961 | Songs for Achilles | Tenor and guitar | 7 July 1961: Aldeburgh. Peter Pears (tenor), Julian Bream (guitar) | Sung at Aldeburgh Festival 1961 | |
| 1962 | Songs for Ariel | Solo voice, piano or harpsichord | 21 September 1962: London. Grayston Burgess and Virginia Pleasants | Adapted from The Tempest incidental music (1962); rearranged in 1964 for voice and small instrumental ensemble | |
| 1970 | Songs for Dov | Tenor and small orchestra | 12 October 1970: Cardiff. Gerard English, London Sinfonietta cond. Michael Tippett | Dedicated "to Eric Walter White" | |
| 1988–90 | Byzantium | Soprano and orchestra | 11 April 1991: Chicago. Faye Robinson, Chicago Symphony Orchestra cond. Sir Georg Solti | | |
| 1995 | Caliban's Song | Baritone and piano | 26 November 1995: London. BBC broadcast, David Barrell (bar), and Iain Burnside (piano) | Incorporated in Suite: The Tempest (1995) | |
| 1995 | Suite: The Tempest | Tenor, baritone, and ensemble | 14 December 1995: London. Martyn Hill, tenor, David Barrell, baritone, Nash Ensemble cond. Andrew Parrot | Arranged by Meiron Bowen from The Tempest incidental music | |

=== Chamber / Instrumental ===
| Date of composition | Title | Musical forces | First performance details | Notes | Ref. |
|---|---|---|---|---|---|
| 1934–35 | String Quartet No. 1 | Violin (2), viola, cello | 9 December 1935: London. Brosa Quartet | Dedicated "to Wilfred Franks". Revised in 1943 | |
| 1936–38 | Piano Sonata No. 1 | Piano | 11 November 1938: London. Phyllis Sellick | Dedicated "to Francesca Allinson" | |
| 1941–42 | String Quartet No. 2 in F♯ | Violin (2), viola, cello | 27 March 1943: London. Zorian Quartet | Dedicated "to Walter Bergmann" | |
| 1945–46 | String Quartet No. 3 | Violin (2), viola, cello | 19 October 1946: London. Zorian Quartet | Dedicated "to Mrs Mary Behrend" | |
| 1946 | "Preludio al Vespro di Monteverdi" | Solo organ | 5 July 1946: London. Geraint Jones | Dedicated "for Geraint Jones" | |
| 1954 | Four Inventions for recorders | Treble and descant recorders | 1 August 1954: London. Society of Recorder Players | | |
| 1955 | Sonata for Four Horns | French horns | 20 December 1955: London Dennis Brain Wind Ensemble | | |
| 1962 | Piano Sonata No. 2 | Piano | 3 September 1962: Edinburgh. Margaret Kitchin | Dedicated "to Margaret Kitchin" | |
| 1962 | Praeludium | Brass, bells and percussion | 14 November 1962: London. BBC Symphony Orchestra (sections) cond. Antal Doráti | Composed for 40th anniversary of the BBC | |
| 1962–63 | "Mosaic" | Wind band | | Setting of first movement of Concerto for Orchestra (1962–63) | |
| 1964 | Prelude, Recitative and Aria | Flute, oboe and harpsichord or piano | February 1964: London. BBC broadcast, Orion Trio | Arrangement of Hermes’ aria "O Divine Music" from King Priam (1958–61) | |
| 1971 | In Memoriam Magistri | Flute, clarinet and string quartet | 17 June 1972: London. London Sinfonietta cond. Elgar Howarth | Commissioned by Tempo magazine in memory of Igor Stravinsky (died 6 April 1971) | |
| 1972–73 | Piano Sonata No. 3 | Piano | 26 May 1973: Bath. Paul Crossley | Dedicated "to Anna Kallin" | |
| 1977–78 | String Quartet No. 4 | Violin (2), viola, cello | 20 May 1979: Bath. Lindsay String Quartet | Dedicated "to Michael Tillett, colleague and friend". For orchestral version see Water Out of Sunlight (1988) | |
| 1982–83 | The Blue Guitar | Solo guitar | 9 November 1983: Pasadena, Ca. Julian Bream | Dedicated "to the memory of Calvin Simmons (1950–82)" | |
| 1983–84 | Piano Sonata No. 4 | Piano | 14 January 1985: Los Angeles. Paul Crossley | Dedicated "to Michael Vyner" | |
| 1985 | A Vision of the Island (adaptation of The Tempest incidental music) | Speakers, four male voices, chamber ensemble | 25 October 1985: London. BBC broadcast, members of Taverner Consort and Nash Ensemble cond. Andrew Parrott | | |
| 1990–91 | String Quartet No. 5 | Violin (2), viola, cello | May 1992: Sheffield. Lindsay Quartet | | |
| 1991 | Prelude: Autumn | Oboe and piano | | | |

=== Brass band ===
| Date of composition | Title | Musical forces | First performance details | Notes | Ref. |
|---|---|---|---|---|---|
| 1943 | Brass Fanfare No. 1 | Four horns, three trumpets, three trombones | 21 September 1943: Northampton. Band of the Northamptonshire Regiment | Commissioned for the 30th anniversary of the consecration of St Matthew's Church, Northampton | |
| 1953 | Brass Fanfares Nos 2 and 3 | No. 2 (four trumpets); No. 3 (three trumpets) | 6 June 1963: St Ives, Cornwall. Trumpeters from RAF Mawgan | | |
| 1980 | Brass Fanfare No. 4: Wolf Trap | Three trumpets, two trombones and tuba | 29 June 1980: Wolf Trap, Virginia. Members of National Symphony Orchestra of Washington, cond. Hugh Wolff | | |
| 1983 | Festal Brass with Blues | Brass band | 6 February 1984: Hong Kong. Fairey Engineering Band. cond. Howard Williams | | |
| 1987 | Brass Band Fanfare No. 5 | 4 horns, 4 trumpets, 2 trombones, bass trombone, tuba, percussion | June 1987: Philip Jones Brass Ensemble cond. Elgar Howarth | Arranged by Meirion Bowen from The Mask of Time | |
| 1987 | Triumph | Concert band: brass, woodwind and percussion | | Commissioned by The New England Conservatory, Baylor University, University of Michigan, Florida State University, Ohio State University and Cincinnati Conservatory | |

== Juvenilia and unpublished works ==
The following works are listed by Ian Kemp as (a) works or fragments whose manuscripts have survived and (b) works whose manuscripts are lost but of which there is a record of public performance.

| Date of composition | Title | Musical forces | Notes |
|---|---|---|---|
| 1926–27 | Arrangements: Bolsters (ballet); "The House that Jack Built"; "Cheerly Men"; "Yang-Tsi-Kiang"; "Three Jovial Huntsmen" | Piano trio | |
| 1927 | The Undying Fire | Baritone, chorus and orchestra | Text by H. G. Wells |
| 1927–28 | The Village Opera: opera in 3 acts | Voices and orchestra | Adaptation of 1729 work by Charles Johnson |
| 1928 | Piano Sonata in C minor | Piano | |
| 1928–30 | String Quartet in F | | |
| 1928–30 | Concerto in D | Flutes, oboe, horns and strings | Manuscript lost |
| 1929 | String Quartet in F minor | | |
| 1929 | Piano variations for Dudley Parvin | Piano | |
| 1929 | Ten variations on a Swiss folksong as harmonised by Beethoven | Piano | |
| 1929 | Three songs: "Sea Love"; Afternoon Tea; Arracombe Fair | Voice and piano | Poems by Charlotte Mew. Music manuscripts of 'Sea Love' and 'Arracombe Fair' lost. |
| 1930 | "Jockey to the Fair": variations | Piano | |
| 1930 | Overture and incidental music: Don Juan | Orchestra | Play (1925) by James Elroy Flecker. Music manuscript lost |
| 1930 | Psalm in C: "The Gateway" | Chorus and orchestra | Text by Christopher Fry |
| 1930 | Sonata in E minor | | Fragments only |
| 1930–31 | Symphonic Movement | Orchestra | |
| 1932 | String Trio in B♭ | | Orchestral version 1932 (fragments only) |
| 1933–34 | Symphony in B♭ | Orchestra | |
| 1934 | Robin Hood (opera) | Voices and orchestra | Libretto by Tippett, Ruth Pennyman and David Ayerst: Performed by an amateur cast at Boosbeck, Yorkshire, in 1934. Some music recycled into Birthday Suite of 1948. |
| 1935 | "Miners" | Chorus and piano | Text by Judy Wogan |
| 1937 | A Song of Liberty: The Marriage of Heaven and Hell | Chorus and orchestra | Poem by William Blake |
| 1938 | Robert of Sicily (Children's opera) | Voices and orchestra | Text by Christopher Fry based on Longfellow |
| 1939 | Seven at one Stroke (Children's opera) | Voices and orchestra | Text by Christopher Fry based on "The Valiant Little Tailor", one of Grimms' Fairy Tales |

== Sources ==
- Bowen, Meirion (1997). Michael Tippett. London: Robson Books. ISBN 1-86105-099-2.
- Kemp, Ian (1987). Tippett: The Composer and his Music. Oxford: Oxford University Press. ISBN 0-19-282017-6.
- Reed, Philip; Cooke, Mervyn; Mitchell, Donald, eds. (2008). Letters from a Life: The Selected Letters of Benjamin Britten 1913–1976. Vol. 4, 1952–1957. Woodbridge, Suffolk: The Britten-Pears Foundation. ISBN 978-1-84383-382-6.
