= Piano Concerto (Tippett) =

British composer Michael Tippett composed his Concerto for Piano and Orchestra between 1953 and 1955 on a commission from the City of Birmingham Symphony Orchestra. The overall character of the work was influenced by the composer's hearing German pianist Walter Gieseking rehearse Ludwig van Beethoven's Fourth Piano Concerto in 1950. Its musical content, while influenced by this concerto, was also shaped largely by Tippett's opera The Midsummer Marriage, which he had completed in 1952. While Tippett had conceived the work initially in the mid-1940s, he had been preoccupied in much of the intervening time with The Midsummer Marriage.

The Piano Concerto was the result of one of Tippett's most complex creative cycles. The events that initiated the cycle contributed to its conceptual dimensions and date back to January 1950 when he was deep into the compositional process for The Midsummer Marriage. Echoes of the opera resonate throughout Concerto while two other previous compositions, the Fantasia on a Theme of Handel (1939–41) and the First Symphony (1944–5), figure prominently in the creative cycle as well.

The Concerto was originally intended for Noel Mewton-Wood, who had assisted Tippett in playing back portions of the piano reduction of The Midsummer Marriage that were meticulously prepared by Michael Tillett, but Mewton-Wood killed himself on 5 December 1953. Further controversy over the concerto erupted when the soloist, Julius Katchen, declared the work unplayable and walked out shortly before its premiere in 1956. Katchen was replaced by Louis Kentner.

With its emphasis on lyricism and poetry rather than high drama and virtuosic display, the Tippett piano concerto has been seen by British composer David Matthews as both commentary on and reaction against the percussive and heroic aspects that had predominated concerto writing in the decades preceding it. This approach was fully in keeping with the composer's stated disdain for what he considered a confrontational rather than collaborative approach to the genre. The work shows Tippett's predilection for incorporating innovative elements within a traditional formal structure. It follows the example of Beethoven's Fourth Piano Concerto in having an expansive opening movement followed by two relatively brief ones. The harmonic basis for much of the piece, however, is built on musical fourths rather than thirds. These chords are treated as consonant, primary harmonies instead of their previously traditional role as dissonances that required resolution. This harmonic base supports a florid lyricism not far removed from The Midsummer Marriage.

== History ==
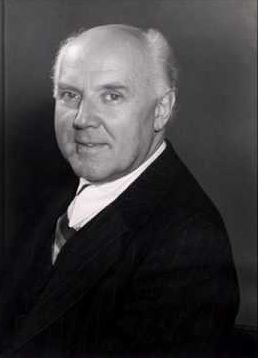
Pianist Walter Gieseking in 1949

In 1953, Tippett received a commission from the John Feeney Charitable Trust to write a work for the City of Birmingham Symphony Orchestra. This was the second work to be commissioned by the Feeney Trust (the first had been the Meditations on a Theme by John Blow by Sir Arthur Bliss). Before then, Tippett had played with the idea of writing a piano concerto.

In 1950, he had heard German pianist Walter Gieseking rehearse the first movement of Beethoven's Fourth Piano Concerto for a concert in England. Gieseking was noted for his interpretation of this concerto, with one British critic writing of a February 1936 performance with the BBC Symphony Orchestra under conductor Adrian Boult that Gieseking was "the right pianist for Beethoven's Fourth Concerto," who played with "precision and delicacy" and offered listeners "all the music, understood clearly, felt profoundly, and seen whole." Tippett later wrote, "Under the influence of an exceptionally poetic yet classical performance of the Beethoven movement, I found myself persuaded that a contemporary concerto might be written, in which the piano is used once again for its poetic capabilities."

== Composition ==
The concerto follows the classical three-movement pattern of fast-slow-fast:

1. Allegro non troppo
2. Molto lento e tranquile
3. Vivace

As such, musicologist Kenneth Gloag points out, it fits in a pattern on Tippett's concerto output that mirrors a historical trajectory—from that of the concerto grosso in his Concerto for Double String Orchestra to that of hybrid concerto grosso and instrumental concerto as typified by his Triple Concerto, Beethoven's Triple Concerto and Johannes Brahms's Double Concerto.

=== I. Allegro non troppo ===
Conventional in its sonata form, this movement opens gently, reminiscent of the Beethoven Fourth Concerto, before the full orchestra enters in an A♭ passage that emphasizes the pastoral tone of the music. Woodwind arabesques introduce a small instrumental ensemble of muted viola, muted horns and celesta. Tippett had used a similar ensemble in The Midsummer Marriage, as Ian Kemp explains, "to emphasize the timeless presences that move beyond the surface realities of life ... mysterious yet familiar."

The soloist interrupts this group by introducing a group of themes and motifs labelled "second subject." This visionary tone returns twice—at the climax of the development section, and during the solo cadenza. These episodes, Kemp says, serve as "unpredictable but reassuring reminders that the vision [of those "timeless presences"] can never be lost." Like in The Midsummer Marriage, Tippett juxtaposes passages of contrasting tone and musical material. One stance of this, as John Palmer points out on Allmusic.com, is the transition to the second theme. There, "an energetic line of sextuplets begins a canonic process that becomes the accompaniment for a lyrical melody of sustained notes and arpeggios in the solo viola. The sextuplets disappear, horns accompany, and the celesta enters quietly with the rhythm of the viola melody. Without warning, winds and brass loudly state fragments of irregular length from the sextuplet passage between rests, bringing the forward motion to a halt."

=== II. Molto lento e tranquile ===
Compared with the serenity of the opening movement, the central one is what Kemp calls "dense and disturbing, a kind of tournament between faceless close canons from pairs of wind instruments and manic cascades from the piano." These exchanges continue on their separate courses until the high strings enter. The soloist, now more ruminative, calms the proceedings.

British musicologist and writer Arnold Whittall considers this movement "more radical and forward-looking" than the opening one, "its textural and tonal conflicts embodied in a polyphony which is elaborate even by Tippett's standards, and with a tripartite form which is progressive rather than symmetrically closed"—a-b-c instead of the usual a-b-a.

=== III. Vivace ===
While the opening Allegro might have evoked the Beethoven Fourth Concerto, the finale is more akin to the same composer's "Emperor" concerto, implied from the opening key change from B to E♭ and the high spirits of the music on the whole. A long section for orchestra alone (a contrast to the near-continuous solo piano in the previous movement) unrolls in three parts which contain a number of small motifs, a striding, bluesy theme at its central section and the reappearance of the celesta in a codetta.

The soloist enters with their own dramatic theme. This sequence of events is actually "the first episode in a scheme in which the orchestral section is the rondo theme, now divided into its three parts with episodes between" (Kemp). The second episode combines piano and orchestra, the third is for piano alone and the last a duet for piano and celesta. The opening rondo returns and a short, jubilant coda ends the concerto in C major.

== Influences ==
=== Resemblance to The Midsummer Marriage ===
Tippett himself noted the piano concerto's close resemblance to his opera The Midsummer Marriage and called its music "rich, linear, lyrical, as in that opera." According to Wilfrid Mellers, Tippett's following a major choral work or opera with an important orchestral or instrumental one was a pattern Tippett followed more than once. Among the composer's other works, he wrote his First Symphony after completing his oratorio A Child of Our Time and his Second Piano Sonata after his opera King Priam. Kemp and Gloag cite the concerto's expansive orchestral lines and florid decoration of these lines as being highly reminiscent of the opera The Midsummer Marriage. They cite particularly the composer's use of celesta "to light up a realm of mystery and magic" (Kemp).

The opera also influenced Tippett's approach to the solo writing in the concerto. While not entirely ignoring the traditional aspects of concerto writing, Tippett focused primarily on a shimmering quality in which, Kemp writes, "the harmonies emerged from the pedalling [sic] of lines of unequal groups of short notes." The composer had used this approach in his song cycle The Heart's Assurance, written in 1951, especially in his setting to the words "the meadows of her breath in the third song (the music for which, Kemp suggests, "sounds as if it was the direct link to the opening phrases of the concerto").

=== Influence of Beethoven ===
Gloag points out Beethoven's Fourth Piano Concerto as an influence in the Tippett concerto. The composer himself described the Gieseking rehearsal of the Beethoven as "the precise moment of conception" for his own work. Gloag suggests the quiet opening of the concerto, with the soloist introducing a G major harmony, as the most obvious fingerprint, from a compositional standpoint, to the Beethoven Fourth. The return of this opening gesture in the key of A♭ major, Gloag continues, "reflects Tippett's engagement" with Beethoven's Piano Sonata No. 31, Op. 110. However, according to Arnold Whittall, Tippett "turns the conventions of Beethovenian sonata form inside out" in the opening movement. As opposed to the dynamic intensity present in Beethoven works such as the Fifth Symphony and the "Emperor" Concerto, Tippett allows "change to take place gradually: ambiguity and avoidance of the explicit are exploited for their capacity to arouse expectations of coherent continuation."

== Analysis ==
Whittall maintains that, because it was an extended orchestral work that followed the protracted gestation of an opera, the Piano Concerto is "one of Tippett's most intriguing and absorbing compositions." He adds that it also follows the Concerto for Double String Orchestra and The Midsummer Marriage in its blend of "lyric reflection and 'active' counterpoint into a highly purposeful relationship... [L]yrirism keeps drama at a distance; but the purely tonal and harmonic 'argument' is still rich and fascinating, while the formal consequences of the lyric episodes took Tippett's already complex relationship with the conventions of the classical-romantic tradition forward to a new stage."

Because it eschews conventional tonal resolution more than The Midsummer Marriage or the Corelli Fantasia, Whittall considers the concerto "more ambitious" than those two works. Even so, Whittall finds the concerto uneven. While he finds the "blurring of tonal focus" in the opening movement "highly effective ... at one with the character of the music," and the combination of "canonic priorities" and "elaborate ornamentation" in the slow movement "require only a very basic harmonic framework," he considers the finale "less memorable because the new need for exuberance and the continuing need for ambiguity tend to get in each other's way."

== Sources ==
- Author unknown. List of commissions from John Feeney Charitable Trust. Accessed 16 Sep 2013
- Gloag, Kenneth, "Tippett and the concerto: From Double to Triple." In Gloag, Kenneth and Nicholas Jones (ed), The Cambridge Companion to Michael Tippett (Cambridge and New York: Cambridge University Press, 2013). ISBN 978-1-107-60613-5.
- Kemp, Ian, Notes for Hyperion CDA67461/2, Tippett: Piano Concerto; Fantasia on a Theme by Handel; Piano Sonatas. Accessed 1 Sep 2013
- Matthews, David, Schott Music preface for sheet music. Tippett: Piano Concerto. Accessed 1 Sept 2013
- Mellers, Wilfrid, "Tippett at the millennium: a personal memoir." In Clarke, David (ed), Tippett Studies (Cambridge and New York: Cambridge University Press, 1999). ISBN 0-521-59205-4.
- Palmer, John, "Michael Tippett: Piano Concerto," www.allmusic.com. Accessed 31 Aug 2013
- Summers, Jonathan, Notes for Naxos 8.111112 – BEETHOVEN: Piano Concertos Nos. 4 and 5 (Gieseking) (1939, 1934) (Concerto Recordings, Vol. 3). Accessed 7 Oct 2013
- Whittall, Alfred, The Music of Britten and Tippett: Studies in Themes and Techniques (Cambridge and New York: Cambridge University Press, 1982). ISBN 0-521-38501-6.
