= James Denny =

James or Jim Denny may refer to:

- James William Denny (1838–1923), U.S. Representative from Maryland
- James Denny (diver) (born 1993), British diver
- James Denny (conductor) (1908–1978), conductor, music scholar and academic
- James C. Denny (1829–1887), American lawyer, judge, and politician in Indiana
- Jim Denny (footballer) (born 1950), Scottish footballer
- Jim Denny (Opry manager) (1911–1963), American music industry executive and general manager of the Grand Ole Opry

== See also ==
- James Denney (1856–1917), Scottish theologian and preacher
