= Symphony No. 2 (Tippett) =

The Symphony No. 2 by the British composer Michael Tippett was completed in 1957 and first performed at the Royal Festival Hall on 5 February 1958.

== Instrumentation ==
The symphony is scored for 2 flutes, (both doubling piccolo), 2 oboes, 2 clarinets in A, 2 bassoons, 4 horns, 2 trumpets, 3 trombones, tuba, percussion (timpani, side drum, bass drum, and cymbals), harp, piano (doubling celeste) and strings.

== Form ==
The symphony is in four movements, marked as follows:

1. Allegro vigoroso
2. Adagio molto e tranquillo
3. Presto veloce
4. Allegro moderato

== History ==
In an insightful essay accompanying the first recording of the work, Tippett writes:

About the time I was finishing 'The Midsummer Marriage' I was sitting one day in a small studio of Radio Lugano, looking out over the sunlit lake, listening to tapes of Vivaldi. Some pounding cello and bass C's, as I remember them, suddenly threw me from Vivaldi's world into my own, and marked the exact moment of conception of the 2nd Symphony. Vivaldi's pounding C's took on a kind of archetypal quality as though to say: here is where we must begin. The 2nd Symphony does begin in that archetypal way, though the pounding C's are no longer Vivaldi's. At once horns in fifths with F sharps force the ear away from the C ground. I don't think we ever hear the C's as classically stating the key of C. We only hear them as a base, or ground upon which we can build, or from which we can take off in flight. When the C's return at the end of the Symphony, we feel satisfied and the work completed, though the final chord which is directed to "let vibrate in the air," builds up from the bass C thus: C16 C8 G C4 D2 AC#E.

It was some years after the incident in Lugano before I was ready to begin composition. While other works were being written I pondered and prepared the Symphony's structure: a dramatic sonata allegro; a song-form slow movement; a mirror-form scherzo in additive rhythm; a fantasia for a finale. Apart from the rather hazy memory of the Vivaldi C's, I wrote down no themes or motives during this period. I prefer to invent the work's form in as great a detail as I can before I invent any sounds whatever. But as the formal invention proceeds, textures, speeds, dynamics, become part of the formal process. So that one comes closer and closer to the sound itself until the moment when the dam breaks and the music of the opening bars spills out over the paper. As I reached this moment in the Symphony the BBC commissioned the piece for the 10th anniversary of the Third Programme, but in the event I was a year late. It was performed first in the Royal Festival Hall, London, in February 1958 and conducted by Adrian Boult.

The Second Symphony mediates accessibility with radical approaches of symphonic construction, and represents both a compendium of his past accomplishments and a springboard for future ones. The combination was a direct result of shifting his conceptualization of symphonic form away from historical models towards a more subjective approach. Its creative cycle resulted in one of Tippett's most accessible compositions, while the re-conceptualization of the form was the foundation for the archetypal division that functioned as the source of his most original and innovative designs. Tippett's radical shift in style did not occur until two years after he completed the Symphony, and is most commonly associated with King Priam (1958–61) and the Second Piano Sonata (1962), but the genesis of this shift occurred during the period in which he was conceiving the Symphony, and its sketches are filled with the nascent techniques that would come to define a new period.

The Symphony's premiere, given by the BBC Symphony Orchestra, at the Royal Festival Hall on 5 February 1958, conducted by Adrian Boult, was notoriously a disaster. Neither orchestra nor conductor was regarded as ideal for the work. In the 1930s, the early years of the BBCSO, it had been regarded as one of the best orchestras in the country, and Boult as a superb conductor; they were renowned in particular for their performances of new music. Post-war, however, the BBCSO was generally agreed to have declined in quality, and in particular to be less adept in new music. Boult, meanwhile, was now approaching 70, and becoming conservative in his repertoire; he had been far down the list of preferred conductors for the evening.

At the premiere, broadcast live on BBC radio, the performance broke down a few minutes into the first movement and had to be restarted. Boult apologised to the audience for the error: "Entirely my mistake, ladies and gentlemen." It later transpired that the orchestra's leader, Paul Beard, had altered the bowing of the string parts to make them more readable, and so public criticism for the collapse was transferred to him and his modifications (critics included the conductor John Barbirolli, himself a string player, who approved the original notation of the parts and blamed Beard's rewrites for obliterating the natural off-beat phrasing that Tippett had carefully notated).

A detailed account of the unravelling of the first performance has been provided by Jonathan del Mar, using a tape recording of the concert made by his father Norman Del Mar.This analysis suggests that the cause of the collapse lay rather with the flute beginning a solo passage a bar too early; the woodwind section en masse proceeded to get a bar ahead of the strings. When the horns (who were taking their cues from the woodwind parts) joined in the melee by coming in a bar too early also, Boult took the decision to halt the performance. Ironically, therefore (in view of the opprobrium attached to Beard), the blame for the collapse may indeed have lain with Boult; it is unclear if the flute player took an independent decision to enter early or was mistakenly cued in by Boult. In a further irony (in view of the insistence of Barbirolli and Tippett that the original notation was preferable, and that rescoring would cause more problems than it would solve), the flute part (which had NOT been altered) was at the point of error written in the complex manner deemed by Beard as unnecessarily complicated for the violins. A combination of correct and incorrect ensemble meant that the "whole thing was at sixes and sevens, and realising that this was now becoming a serious misrepresentation of the piece (Boult) threw in the towel."

Relations between Tippett and the BBC were already strained, due to Tippett's missing the requested 1957 deadline, and his subsequent tardiness in meeting the new February 1958 deadline (he only informed them of having completed the work in November 1957, and the parts required printing and proofing before the piece could be rehearsed by the orchestra). The misfortunes of the premiere soured them further: the BBC Controller of Music insisted that the orchestra could not be blamed for the performance, since it was "equal to all reasonable demands" made by composers, implying that Tippett's demands were not reasonable; stung by this, Tippett made no attempt to defend the BBCSO from criticism, later using his autobiography to blame all involved except himself and his own writing (he had, he said, urged to Boult and Beard that the editorial changes would do more harm than good";and so it turned out"). He broke a scheduled commitment to conduct the piece himself at the BBC Proms later that year, with Boult instead taking the engagement. In response, the BBC invited him to the rehearsals of that performance, on condition that he did not approach within 40 feet of the platform, a condition which required him to shout out for Boult's attention and summon him over whenever he wanted to make a point to the conductor.

Despite the blame which still generally attaches to Beard for the mistake (e.g., in a 2005 British library exhibition), orchestras since have routinely played the piece using his editorial changes. However, the published score of the symphony is printed with Tippett's original notation.

== Musical analysis ==
The symphony is considered by some writers to be a transitional work, marking a change from the abundant lyricism of works such as the opera The Midsummer Marriage and the Corelli Fantasia to a tauter, more austere style as represented by the opera King Priam and the second Piano Sonata of 1962. In these works the forward thrust of the classical sonata allegro is replaced by a new fragmentation using the juxtaposition of strongly contrasting blocks of material. Another distinct change is the increased use of polytonality and non-tonal harmony: the chord on C referred to in the article above is a clear example of this, consisting of a compression of the chords of C, D and A in one vertical alignment.

Here is Tippett's own description of the work:

One of the vital matters to be decided in the period of gestation before composition, is the overall length; and then the kind of proportions that best fit this length. The Symphony takes about 35 minutes to play and its four movements are tolerably equal, though the slow movement is somewhat longer than the others. So it is not a long, spun-out rhapsodic work, but a short, concentrated dramatic work. And this concentration, compression even, is made clear from the word go.

The opening sonata allegro makes big dramatic gestures above the pounding, opening C's, and is driven along and never loiters. It divides itself into fairly equal quarters: statement, first argument, re-statement, second argument and coda. the lyrical quality of the slow movement is emphasised by presenting the 'song' of the song-form (after a short introduction) at first on divided cellos and later on divided violins. In between lies a lengthy and equally lyrical passage for all the string body. The woodwind and brass accompany the 'songs' with cluster-like chords decorated by harp and piano.The movement ends with a tiny coda for the four horns, a sound I remembered from the 'Sonata for Four Horns' which I had already written.
The scherzo is entirely in additive rhythm. Additive rhythm means simply that short beats of two quavers and long beats of three quavers are added together indefinitely in a continuous flow of unequal beats. The movement has been called an 'additive structure', which I think very well describes it. At the central point heavy long beats are contrasted against light short beats in a kind of tour de force of inequality issuing in a climax of sound with brilliante trumpets to the fore. The movement then unwinds, via a cadenza-like passage for piano and harp alone to its end.

The finale is a fantasia in that its four sections do not relate to each other, like the four sections of the first movement sonata allegro, but go their own way. Section 1 is short and entirely introductory; section 2 is the longest and is a close-knit set of variations on a ground; section 3 is a very long melody which begins high up on violins and goes over at half-way to cellos who take the line down to their bottom note, the C of the original pounding C's'; section 4 is a coda of five gestures of farewell.
