= John DeMain =

American conductor

John Lee DeMain (born January 11, 1944) is an American conductor who serves as music director of the Madison Symphony Orchestra in Wisconsin, as well as serving as artistic director of Madison Opera.

He was music director and principal conductor of Houston Grand Opera for eighteen years in the 1970s and 1980s, establishing a reputation for conducting new operas. Notable among the world premieres he led there were Floyd's Willie Stark (1981), Bernstein's A Quiet Place (1983), Adams's Nixon in China (1987) and Tippett's New Year (1989). DeMain also conducted the United States premiere of Akhnaten, by Philip Glass, in 1984. One of his early achievements with the chorus and orchestra of the Houston company was the second-ever complete recording of Gershwin's Porgy and Bess, made for RCA in 1976 in its New York studios. Today, besides his work in Madison, he acts as occasional guest conductor for Los Angeles Opera.

In January 2023, DeMain received a Lifetime Achievement Award from the National Opera Association.

DeMain lives in Madison.
