= West Riding Professor of Music =

Named chair at the University of Leeds

The West Riding Professorship of Music was established as a named chair at the University of Leeds in 1949 and paid for, initially, by £5,000 annually from the West Riding County Council. The first appointee was J. R. Denny, who took up the chair in 1950.

== List of West Riding Professors of Music ==
- 1950–1971: James Runciman Denny, MBE.
- 1971–1976: Alexander Goehr.
- 1977–1981: Ian Manson Kemp.
- 1982–2002: Julian Gordon Rushton.
