= Symphony No. 4 (Tippett) =

Michael Tippett's Symphony No. 4 was written in 1977 as a commission for the Chicago Symphony Orchestra, who premiered it on 6 October of that year under the baton of Georg Solti. It was dedicated to Tippett's biographer and friend, Ian Kemp.

== Form ==
It is written in one movement divided into seven sections:

1. Introduction and exposition
2. Development 1
3. Slow movement
4. Development 2
5. Scherzo and trios
6. Development 3
7. Recapitulation

In terms of form, it combines sonata and fantasia forms, as well as that of the symphonic poem.

== Tippett's periods ==
Tippett called the work "a birth to death piece". This is emphasized by a "breathing effect", either from tape or sampler, particularly prominent at the beginning and the end of the symphony, with a single, unaccompanied intake of breath as its conclusion.

Stylistically, the Fourth Symphony unites all previous stylistic tendencies in Tippett's work: the counterpoint and gentle lyricism of his first creative period and the angular, spiky modernism of his second period, thus creating a third and final period. Tippett quotes the opening of this Symphony in his Piano Sonata No. 4.

== Instrumentation ==
Tippett's score calls for a large orchestra consisting of:

- 2 flutes (both doubling piccolos), 2 oboes, cor anglais, 2 clarinets, bass clarinet, 2 bassoons, contrabassoon
- 6 horns, 3 trumpets, 3 trombones, 2 tubas
- timpani, Percussion (requires 4 players): snare drum, tenor drum, bass drum, tom-toms, cymbals, wood block, triangle, xylophone, marimba, vibraphone, glockenspiel, tubular bells, maracas, claves
- harp, piano, tape or sampler (breathing effect)
- strings
