= Ernst Eulenburg (musical editions) =

Music publisher

- Parent company: Schott Music
- Founded: 1874
- Founder: Ernst Eulenburg
- Country of origin: Germany
- Headquarters location: Mainz
- Publication types: Sheet music
- Official website: www.schott-music.com

Ernst Eulenburg the music publisher was established by Ernst Eulenburg in Leipzig in 1874. The firm started by publishing a series of studies by a Dresden piano teacher, and then expanded into light music and works for men's chorus, at first all non-copyright works.

== Origins of the miniature scores ==
In 1891, Eulenburg acquired the company of Payne who had recently started to publish miniature scores of chamber works, thus effectively establishing the basis for the famous miniature scores which are what Eulenburg is famous for today. The catalogue was further expanded in 1908 by the acquisition of the catalogue of Donajowski, who published miniature scores of orchestral works in England.

== Later history of the company ==
In 1905, Ernst's son Kurt began to work in the firm, a connection maintained until his retirement at age 90 in 1968. After Ernst died in 1926, Kurt took over and began to introduce important revisions of scores by leading musicologists such as Alfred Einstein (who edited, for example, Don Giovanni) and Friedrich Blume (who edited the Mozart piano concertos). At the same time, Eulenburg began to publish the work of contemporary composers such as Paul Graener and the "classical" compositions of the film composer Miklós Rózsa.

== The war years ==
Kurt Eulenburg and his family were expelled from Germany in 1939 just before the outbreak of the second world war, and settled in Zurich. The firm Ernst Eulenburg Ltd, London was set up after negotiations with Eulenburg's London agents, Goodwin & Tabb; while the Leipzig concern was expropriated and continued under the name of Horst Sander KG.

== Eulenburg after the war ==
After the war ended in 1945, Eulenburg moved to London to take over control of the firm there, and began slowly to expand the catalogue again. Towards the end of the 1950s, Eulenburg were acquired by Schott & Co. who produce the Edition Eulenburg today. Walter Bergmann acted as editor-in-chief until 1967, when Roger Fiske took on the job until 1975. Today, over 1200 titles are produced under the name of Edition Eulenburg, scores that are instantly recognisable by their small size and bright yellow covers.
