= New Year (opera) =

1989 opera by Michael Tippett

- Opera by Michael Tippett
- Librettist: Tippett
- Language: English
- Premiere: 27 October 1989; Houston Grand Opera

New Year is a British opera in three acts with music and libretto by Sir Michael Tippett. As with Tippett's other operas, the text and music encompass a widely eclectic range of cultural references. Tippett has noted that the "primary metaphor" of the opera is dance. The choreographer of the original production was the noted American dancer Bill T. Jones.

== Performance history ==
The opera received its world premiere at Houston Grand Opera on 27 October 1989, in a production by Sir Peter Hall. Hall subsequently directed the first UK production at Glyndebourne, which ran in the period of July-August 1990. Glyndebourne Touring Opera subsequently presented an adapted version of Peter Hall's production in October 1990 at Glyndebourne and at the Theatre Royal, Glasgow, and in November 1990 at the Apollo Theatre, Oxford.

The BBC Scottish Symphony Orchestra presented a semi-staged concert performance of New Year on 13 April 2024 at Glasgow City Halls, a performance recorded for commercial release in 2025 by NMC Recordings. The most recent full staging of the opera was in July 2024 by Birmingham Opera Company, directed by Keith Warner.

== Roles ==
Roles, voice type, premiere cast
Role	Voice type	Premiere cast, 27 October 1989 Houston Grand Opera Conductor: John DeMain	UK premiere cast, 1 July 1990 Glyndebourne Opera Conductor: Andrew Davis
Jo Ann, a trainee children's doctor	lyric soprano	Helen Field	Helen Field
Donny, her young brother	light baritone	Krister St. Hill	Krister St. Hill
Nan, their foster mother	dramatic mezzo-soprano	Jane Shaulis	Jane Shaulis
Merlin, the computer wizard	dramatic baritone	James Maddalena	James Maddalena
Pelegrin, the space pilot	lyric tenor	Peter Kazaras	Philip Langridge
Regan, their boss	dramatic soprano	Richetta Manager	Richetta Manager
The presenter	microphoned male singer	John Schiappa	Nigel Robson

== Synopsis ==
The story of the opera moves between two worlds, of "Somewhere and Today" and "Nowhere and Tomorrow".

=== Act 1 ===
Jo Ann is a child psychologist who wants to work with young victims of the urban conflict going on in "Terror Town" outside of her domicile. However, she is so afraid of Terror Town that she does not venture out of the apartment. Her Rastafarian foster brother Donny is generally delinquent in his behaviour towards her and their mutual foster mother, Nan. Out of nowhere, a spaceship emerges, carrying Merlin, a "computer wizard", and the pilot Pelegrin, under the leadership of Regan. These are time travelers from the future, and the ship makes a connection with Jo Ann's apartment.

=== Act 2 ===
It is centered at a New Year's festivity. A shaman, in a trance, induces the crowd of revellers to pummel Donny as part of the celebration. The space ship arrives and Merlin asserts his authority over the activities. Jo Ann and Pelegrin do meet, but they are separated when the spaceship leaves the scene. Jo Ann saves Donny from the beating crowd, and the act ends to the sounds of the traditional song "Auld Lang Syne".

=== Act 3 ===
Pelegrin presents Jo Ann with a symbolic rose, as a symbol of their love. She loses the rose, but he recovers it. Jo Ann is finally cured of her fears and can go out again into the world outside of her home. The Presenter summarizes the final message as: "One humanity, one justice".
