= Walter Bergmann (musician) =

German-born musician and editor

Walter Bergmann (24 September 1902 – 13 January 1988) was a German harpsichord and recorder player, editor and composer who settled in England in 1939. He became a key figure in the revival of interest in the recorder and the counter tenor voice in England after the war.

Born in the Altona borough of Hamburg, Bergman attended the Leipzig Conservatory to study piano and flute, but seeking a more practical career path due to the turbulent times, shifted to study law. He set up his own law practise in 1933, helping many Jewish clients. After his arrest by the Gestapo in June 1938 and three months of imprisonment, he emigrated to London in March 1939, with the assistance of Edward Dent. His wife Greta (Haase) and daughter Erica followed a few months later. Like many other émigré musicians at the time, Bergmann was interned as an enemy alien from July 1940 on the Isle of Man. The composer Hans Gál was there at the same time. Bergmann was eventually released in January 1941.

Bergmann began establishing himself in the music publishing world as a packer at Schott Music from 1942. He later became an editor there working on Baroque music, especially Telemann, Handel, John Blow and Henry Purcell. He taught at Morley College from 1942 until 1954 as a colleague of Michael Tippett, and later at the Mary Ward Settlement. As a performer he accompanied Alfred Deller, Ilse Wolf (1921–1999), April Cantelo and others, appearing at Deller's Stour Festival and recording Purcell's music with him. He also translated Tippett's King Priam into German in 1963.

Bergmann taught and composed for the recorder, encouraging younger players such as Frans Brüggen and Michala Petri. He helped re-establish the Society of Recorder Players in 1946, promoted new interest amateur recorder playing while at Morley College, and contributed to the professional revival of Early Music in the UK. At Schott, where he stayed until 1967, Bergmann issued editions of many recorder works, including sonatas and suites by Francesco Barsanti, Charles Dieupart and Johann Christian Schickhardt. He composed two sonatas for recorder, and (for Alfred Deller) a Pastorale for countertenor and recorder and the Three Songs for countertenor and guitar, which have been recorded.

He was also general editor of the Eulenburg edition of miniature scores. He continued to teach in London for many years and maintained his scholarly interests until the end of his life. He lived at 28 Belsize Square, London NW1. An 80th birthday concert was held for him at Morley College in November, 1982. Bergmann died in London, aged 85.

== See also ==
- List of émigré composers in Britain
