= James Denny (conductor) =

British conductor and academic

James Runciman Denny, MBE (9 May 1908 – 29 May 1978) was a conductor, music scholar and academic.

== Career ==
Born on 9 May 1908, Denny was educated at the Royal College of Music and Christ's College, Cambridge; he graduated with a Bachelor of Arts degree in 1930 and a Bachelor of Music degree in 1932. The following year, he was appointed director of music at Bedford School. In 1937, he was appointed Music Assistant with the BBC in Belfast, but left in 1939 to fight in the Second World War. In January 1940, he was commissioned into the Royal Warwickshire Regiment, and was appointed a Member of the Order of the British Empire in June 1944, when he was a Captain (temporary Major and acting Lieutenant Colonel).

After the Second World War, Denny returned to the BBC; in 1946, he was appointed Head of Midland Regional Music and conductor of the BBC Midland Chorus and Singers. In 1950, he moved into an academic role when he was appointed the first West Riding Professor of Music at the University of Leeds. According to The Times, his "reputation [already established by his BBC work] was enhanced by his work in building up a degree course and perhaps particularly by his championship of the University's Music Society". He retired in 1971.

Denny's work outside of university included a term as president of the Incorporated Society of Musicians in 1964. He was also involved in the Leeds Triennial Festival and the Leeds Guild of Singers. He died on 29 May 1978.

== Selected works ==
- The Oxford School Harmony Course, 2 vols. (Oxford University Press, 1960).
- Hymn to Christ the King (choral work, 1963, published by OUP).
