= Heather Harper =

Northern Irish operatic soprano (1930–2019)

Heather Harper CBE
- Born: Heather Mary Harper; 8 May 1930; Belfast, Northern Ireland
- Died: 22 April 2019 (aged 88); London, England
- Education: Trinity College of Music
- Occupation: Operatic soprano
- Organizations: Ambrosian Chorus; BBC Chorus; English Opera Group; Royal Opera House
- Spouses: Leonard Buck (m. 1952; div. 1972) Eduardo Benarroch (m. 1973)

Heather Mary Harper CBE (8 May 1930 – 22 April 2019) was a Northern Irish operatic soprano. She was active internationally in both opera and concert. She performed roles such as Helena in Benjamin Britten's A Midsummer Night's Dream at the Royal Opera House, Elsa in Wagner's Lohengrin at the Bayreuth Festival, and the Countess in Mozart's The Marriage of Figaro at the Metropolitan Opera. She became known internationally when she stepped in for the world premiere of Britten's War Requiem in 1962, and remained associated with the composer's work, but also sang other premieres.

== Early life and education ==
Heather Harper was born on 8 May 1930 in Belfast, the daughter of Mary (née Robb) and Hugh Harper, a lawyer. She and her three siblings received early musical training. She studied piano at the Trinity College of Music in London on a scholarship, with viola and cello as additional subjects. When the opportunity to study voice came up, she won another scholarship.

She initially sang as a mezzo-soprano. She was a member of the Ambrosian Chorus, where her fellow altos included Jean Allister, Pamela Bowden and Helen Watts, the BBC Chorus and the George Mitchell Singers. Her voice at this time was characterised by its "bright, flexible coloratura", more typical of a soprano. She studied with Helene Isepp, and retrained as a soprano with Frederick Husler and Yvonne Rodd-Marling, the authors of Singing: The Physical Nature of the Vocal Organ.

== Career ==
Her professional debut came in 1954, singing Lady Macbeth in Verdi's Macbeth at the Oxford University Opera Club, produced by Jack Westrup. Her performance was a critical success, and she was subsequently given the role of Violetta in a 1956 television production of La traviata. She was a member of the English Opera Group from 1956 to 1975. Her first role at the Royal Opera House (ROH) Covent Garden was Helena in Benjamin Britten's A Midsummer Night's Dream in 1962. Later roles there included the title role in Arabella by Richard Strauss, Blanche in Poulenc's Les dialogues des Carmélites, Antonia in Offenbach's Les contes d'Hoffmann, Gutrune in Wagner's Götterdämmerung, Micaëla in Bizet's Carmen, Eva in Wagner's Die Meistersinger von Nürnberg, Hecuba in King Priam, Chrysothemis in Elektra, the Empress in Die Frau ohne Schatten and the title role in Ariadne auf Naxos. She appeared at the ROH in 1975 as Ellen Orford in Britten's Peter Grimes in a new production staged by Elijah Moshinsky, alongside Jon Vickers in the title role. She also created Nadia in Tippett's The Ice Break and Mrs Coyle in the stage premiere of Britten's Owen Wingrave at the ROH; she had previously sung in the television premiere of Owen Wingrave in 1970: a "high point" in her many performances for television, according to her obituary in The Guardian. Her farewell performance at the ROH was Ellen in Peter Grimes in 1981. A critic noted in an obituary: "Her sympathy for the character drew a near-definitive portrayal."

At the Bayreuth Festival, Harper appeared as Elsa in Lohengrin in 1967 and 1968, conducted by Rudolf Kempe. She made her debut at the Metropolitan Opera as Contessa Almaviva in Mozart's The Marriage of Figaro in 1977. She also sang Charlotte in Massenet's Werther for the San Francisco Opera. She appeared as a regular guest at the Teatro Colón in Buenos Aires, including roles such as Marguerite in Gounod's Faust and Vitellia in Mozart's La clemenza di Tito. In 1982, the soprano debuted with the New York City Opera in the name part of Gluck's Alceste.

Harper also had an extensive concert career. She sang in the premiere of Britten's War Requiem at Coventry Cathedral with Dietrich Fischer-Dieskau and Peter Pears in 1962, substituting for Galina Vishnevskaya at ten days' notice. In 1965, she was the soprano soloist in the second UK performance of Delius's Requiem in Liverpool, conducted by Charles Groves. She sang in it again in 1968 in London, conducted by Meredith Davies, and appeared in the first recording with the same participants. In 1975, she was the soprano soloist in Verdi's Requiem at London's Kingsway Hall with the Royal Philharmonic Orchestra conducted by Carlos Païta. At the Belfast Last Night of the Proms in 1985, she gave the world premiere of Malcolm Williamson's song cycle Next Year in Jerusalem to international critical acclaim. She sang the soprano solo in the world premiere of Tippett's Third Symphony in 1972.

She retired from her singing career in 1994. Her final performance was at the BBC Proms, singing Alban Berg's Altenberg Lieder and Ralph Vaughan Williams's Serenade to Music.

== Recordings ==
Her recordings include Peter Grimes in both audio and video formats. In 1957, she took part in first recordings, conducted by Antony Hopkins, of sacred works by Michel Richard Delalande for the L'Oiseau-Lyre label. Some 1970s recordings, conducted by Sir Georg Solti, were reissued, notably Mahler's Eighth Symphony with Lucia Popp, Arleen Augér, Yvonne Minton, Helen Watts, René Kollo, John Shirley-Quirk and Martti Talvela; and Die Frau ohne Schatten by Richard Strauss with Helga Dernesch, Ruth Hesse, James King and Walter Berry (Covent Garden, 1976, Fiori). Two of her recordings won the Grammy Award, Peter Grimes in 1979 and Songs Of Maurice Ravel in 1984. In 1964, the soprano sang in the first recording of Schoenberg's Von heute auf morgen (released in 1971), conducted by Robert Craft.

She recorded Britten's War Requiem in 1991 in an award-winning CD conducted by Richard Hickox. Alan Blyth wrote, comparing the recording to earlier ones:

Heather Harper has at last recorded the "role" she created – indeed it is her farewell to her many admirers as she has now retired. I heard her sing it in St Paul's not long ago and thought then that her peculiar accents, her inevitable shaping of so much of the part simply had to be preserved for posterity. Her perceptions are superior to those of both Haywood (Shaw) and Söderström (Rattle) by virtue of her longer association with the piece, and her tone shows very few signs of the advancing years. Of course, Vishnevskaya's hieratical utterance (Decca) is something unique and inimitable, but for a comprehensive understanding of what Britten wanted, Harper is hard to equal.

In 2005, a live concert performance of Britten's Our Hunting Fathers was issued on the London Philharmonic Orchestra's own label.

== Personal life ==
Harper married twice. Her first marriage to Leonard Buck ended in divorce in 1972. She married Argentinian scientist Eduardo E. Benarroch in 1973.

Harper's sister was a cellist in the City of Birmingham Symphony Orchestra and her brother was a hornist with the ROH, the Royal Philharmonic and the English Chamber Orchestra.

Heather Harper received the CBE in 1965. She died on 22 April 2019, aged 88.
