= Symphony No. 3 (Tippett) =

Symphony No. 3 by Michael Tippett is a work for soprano and orchestra with text written by the composer.

It was composed between 1970 and 1972 and received its premiere on 22 June 1972 at the Royal Festival Hall, London, performed by the London Symphony Orchestra with the soprano Heather Harper conducted by Colin Davis.

The symphony is notable for its use of blues and its direct quotation of the opening of the finale of Beethoven's Ninth Symphony. The work criticises the ecstatic and utopian understanding of the brotherhood of man as expressed in the Ode to Joy and instead stresses man's capacity for both good and evil. The work is consequently characterised by contrasting and conflicting parts, its overall design being "one massive antithesis".

== Movements ==
The work consists of two parts:

1. Allegro non troppo e pesante (Arrest) – Allegro molto e con grande energia (Movement)
2. Allegro molto – Slow Blues (Andante) – Fast blues (Allegro)

== Background ==
Tippett's conception of the Third Symphony occurred during a concert in Edinburgh in 1965 during a performance of either Pierre Boulez's Piano Sonata No. 2 or Pli selon pli. Tippett detected an absence of harmonic, rhythmic and melodic motion in the work. Such an approach to composition could only be utilised by Tippett if he presented it within the context of a dialectic with its opposite, hence the Third Symphony was constructed on the concepts of "arrest" and "movement" which Tippett likened to the pull and thrust of a jet engine. Parts 1 and 2 of the work, and their component sections, follow this cycle of "arrest" and "movement".

Describing its creative cycle, Tippett remarked: "The work took seven years of intermittent consideration and eventual creation. From such tiny noting of a future possibility I had to put down a kind of mnemonic shorthand, so that I could remember what I thought the structure of the whole work might be when I’d only experienced the initial moment of conception. ...a great many disjointed, unstructured notions have been noted in my own kind of verbal shorthand. ...the original spontaneous conception of “immobile” polarized against “speedy” (so ridiculously simple, but clearly having the power to initiate the creative process now apparently ready to being) was always the structuring factor. While holding these ideas in my mind over a period of years, allowing them gradually to grow, I come next to a moment when I had nearly everything in my mind except the notes. The symphony so far had a structure and balance; it had ideas about orchestration. Thus I could begin what is usually thought of as the composition. I began at the piano a search for the right sounds. Now I don’t find the precise sounds I want on the piano, but through the piano (this is after all a piece for an orchestra). But I can invent as though the orchestral score were in my head all the time."

Tippett wanted to avoid the "Shostakovich bombast" characteristic of many finales and decided to compose the finale as a set of blues. He possessed a great admiration for Bessie Smith's 1925 recording of St Louis Blues in particular. Tippett interpreted the repeated bass line of the blues in terms of a Purcellian ground bass, which would make the finale a form of passacaglia. The most important reason for Tippett's decision to use the blues was its ability to communicate simply and directly.

By the time Tippett came to compose the symphony in spring 1970, he had already written the text of the four songs for the finale. Mahler's settings of Chinese poems in Das Lied von der Erde served as a precedent for Tippett of a work which articulated song text in the shape of a symphony: "I began thus to plan and organize lyrics that would have a shape - of a human being moving from innocence to experience". The symphony's text was formulated as a critical response to the sentiment embodied in Schiller's Ode to Joy: Schiller's ecstatic celebration of the brotherhood of man was untenable in a century that had witnessed the Holocaust, gulags and the dropping of the atomic bomb on Hiroshima. In the dramatic fourth song, therefore, Beethoven's Ninth Symphony is quoted three times at climactic points and its message is challenged in the text and music of the work. Tippett's confrontation with Beethoven is suggested from the outset of the piece, the abrupt chords in the first bar being reminiscent of the opening of Beethoven's own Symphony No. 3.

== Manuscript ==
The Third Symphony is certainly one Tippett’s most peculiar looking manuscripts, and his notational practices deserve closer inspection as they reveal how his conceptual design and the compositional strategies he required to deliver it demanded he entirely re-conceive the orchestra, even his own re-conceptualized post-Priam orchestra found in his Concerto for Orchestra.

The manuscript of the work is in the Tippett Collection (Add MS 61796-61798) of the British Library.
