= The Ice Break =

Opera by Sir Michael Tippett, dedicated to Sir Colin Davis

- Opera by Michael Tippett
- Librettist: Michael Tippett
- Language: English
- Premiere: 7 July 1977; Royal Opera House, London

The Ice Break is an English-language opera in three acts, with music and libretto to an original scenario by Sir Michael Tippett. The opera received its premiere at the Royal Opera House, Covent Garden on 7 July 1977, conducted by Colin Davis, the dedicatee of the opera.

One meaning of the opera's title is a reference to the actual physical breaking of ice on the frozen northern rivers, signaling the advent of spring. The composer has said that the subject of the opera is "whether or not we can be reborn from the stereotypes we live in." John Warrack has noted that the work "confronts questions of stereotype on a wider scale" compared to Tippett's earlier operas, and also in a contemporary setting. Tippett himself put this line on a preface page to a published score of the opera, the opening of François Villon's Ballade des pendus::

"Brother humans who live after us, do not harden your hearts against us."

== Performance history ==
A German translation was given at the Kiel Opera House the year following its premiere. The Opera Company of Boston staged the work in May 1979 for 3 performances, under the direction of Sarah Caldwell, in the first professional production of a Tippett opera in the USA. Covent Garden revived the opera in the same year, but was not thereafter seen until a 1990 concert production at the Henry Wood Proms in the Royal Albert Hall in 1990. A recording was made with the 1990 cast.

Birmingham Opera Company, in partnership with 45 arts and social organizations in Birmingham who provided the amateur actors to perform in the many crowd scenes in the opera, gave the second UK and third in total production of the opera, in five promenade-style performances of the opera in the B12 warehouse in the Digbeth area of central Birmingham, in April 2015. Graham Vick directed the production, with the Birmingham Opera Company Chorus and the City of Birmingham Symphony Orchestra conducted by Andrew Gourlay.

== Roles ==
Role	Voice type (composer's description)	Premiere Cast, 7 July 1977 Royal Opera House, Covent Garden Conductor: Colin Davis	USA premiere, 18 May 1979 Opera Company of Boston Conductor: Sarah Caldwell	1990 Proms concert performance, 23 July 1990, Royal Albert Hall London Sinfonietta, London Sinfonietta Chorus Conductor: David Atherton	Birmingham Opera Company, April 2015 Conductor: Andrew Gourlay
Lev, a 50-year-old teacher	bass	John Shirley-Quirk	Richard Fredricks	David Wilson-Johnson	Andrew Slater
Nadia, his wife	lyric soprano	Heather Harper	Arlene Saunders	Heather Harper	Nadine Benjamin
Yuri, their son	baritone	Tom McDonnell	Jake Gardner	Sanford Sylvan	Ross Ramgobin
Gayle, Yuri's native-born white girlfriend	dramatic soprano	Josephine Barstow	Leigh Munro	Carolann Page	Stephanie Corley
Hannah, a hospital nurse, Gayle's black friend	rich mezzo-soprano	Beverly Vaughn	Cynthia Clarey	Cynthia Clarey	Chrystal E. Williams
Olympion, a sports champion, Hannah's boyfriend	tenor	Clyde Walker	Curtis Rayam	Tom Randle	Ta'u Pupu'a
Luke, a young intern at Hannah's hospital	tenor	John Dobson		Bonaventura Bottone	John-Colyn Gyeantey
Lieutenant	baritone	Roderick Kennedy		Donald Maxwell	Adam Green
Astron, a 'psychedelic messenger'	lyric mezzo-soprano and high tenor (or countertenor)	James Bowman		Christopher Robson	Anna Harvey, Meili Li

== Synopsis ==
Prior to the action of the opera, Nadia had emigrated with her baby son, Yuri, after her husband, Lev, had been sentenced to the prison camps of Russia.

=== Act 1 ===
The opera opens in an airport lounge, where Lev, a Russian dissident, arrives to join his wife, Nadia, and his son, Yuri, in the West in exile after 20 years in prison. In the airport also are Yuri's girlfriend Gayle and Gayle's friend Hannah, who are also waiting the arrival of the black athlete, Olympion, a Muhammad Ali-like character. Lev and Olympion separately arrive. Lev reunites with Nadia and Yuri, but Yuri feels distant from Lev, since he has never met his father as an adult. In the meantime, Gayle throws herself at Olympion, which angers Yuri and causes him to attack Olympion, who knocks him down. Back at home, Yuri expresses anger at his father.

=== Act 2 ===
Among Olympion's fans, there are gang rivalries which crystallise into a conflict between blacks and whites. Gayle and Yuri wear masks and blend into the masked white chorus, while the same is true on the black side for Olympion and Hannah. The conflict explodes into a mob riot, and Olympion and Gayle die in the violence. Yuri is barely alive and is taken to hospital.

=== Act 3 ===
Nadia, on the brink of death, asks Hannah to take care of Lev. In an interlude, the psychedelic messenger Astron has appeared, and a drugged-out crowd hails him as a saviour. Astron dismisses this and disappears. Back in the hospital, Yuri has undergone successful surgery, and is totally encased in a plaster cast. The cast is cut away, and Yuri stands. Yuri eventually embraces his father.

== Recordings ==
- Virgin Classics 7 91448-2: David Wilson-Johnson (Lev), Heather Harper (Nadia), Sanford Sylvan (Yuri), Carolann Page (Gayle), Cynthia Clarey (Hannah), Thomas Randle (Olympion), Bonaventura Bottone (Luke), Donald Maxwell (Lieutenant), Christopher Robson, Sarah Walker; London Sinfonietta Chorus; London Sinfonietta; David Atherton, conductor
