= Ian Kemp =

Scottish musicologist (1931–2011)

Ian Manson Kemp (26 June 1931 – 16 September 2011) was a musicologist and academic.

== Biography ==
Born in Edinburgh on 26 June 1931, Kemp was the son of Roland Kemp, a radio engineer. He attended King Edward VI Grammar School in Chelmsford and Felsted School, before completing National Service in Germany. In 1951, he began undergraduate studies at St John's College, Cambridge under Patrick Hadley and Robin Orr. On graduating in 1954, he began working for Schott & Co., the music publisher. In 1959, he was appointed an assistant lecturer at the University of Aberdeen; he briefly returned to Schott's (1962–64) as head of promotion, but then went back to Aberdeen, this time to take up a senior lectureship. He was elected a fellow of St John's College, Cambridge, in 1971, remaining there until his appointment to the West Riding Chair of Music at the University of Leeds in 1977. He moved to the University of Manchester in 1981 to be Professor of Music, and remained there until retirement in 1991.

Kemp's time at Schott's brought him into contact with distinguished composers, including Michael Tippett, Alexander Goehr, Peter Maxwell Davies and Harrison Birtwistle. He became an expert on Tippett's music, and at Aberdeen he edited Michael Tippett: A Symposium on his 60th Birthday in 1965. His time at Manchester, which The Guardian considers the "culmination" of his career, saw him write a biography of Tippett in 1984, which The Times considered "masterly". He was also a specialist in Paul Hindemith, surveying his work in 1970, and Hector Berlioz, editing the Cambridge Opera Handbook on Berlioz's Les Troyens in 1989.

In his retirement, he lived in North London and then Sussex, but health problems slowed down his scholarly output. He died on 16 September 2011, leaving a widow, the conductor Sian Edwards, and their son, and five children from his first marriage to Gill Turner.
