= Symphony No. 1 (Tippett) =

The Symphony No. 1 by the British composer Michael Tippett was completed in 1945.

== History ==
Tippett began to think about writing a symphony while in prison in 1943. He had already written one symphony (in B♭) but rejected it as immature and over-influenced by Sibelius.

The new symphony was completed on 25 August 1945 and received its first performance on 10 November 1945 by the Liverpool Philharmonic Orchestra conducted by Sir Malcolm Sargent. According to Nicolas Slonimsky, Sargant was unprepared for the difficulties of the score. It was a further two years before the symphony received its London premiere, under Walter Goehr.

== Music ==
The symphony is scored for 3 flutes (all doubling piccolos), 2 oboes, 2 clarinets in A, 2 bassoons, contrabassoon, 4 horns, 3 trumpets, 3 trombones, tuba, timpani, percussion (1 player): bass drum, cymbals and strings.

The symphony is in four movements, marked as follows:

1. Allegro vigoroso, quasi alla breve
2. Adagio
3. Presto
4. Allegro moderato ma con brio

Tippett himself said that the symphony was exuberant rather than refined: "... it's got drive and it's highly wrought". After an energetic and rhythmically insistent opening movement, the Adagio is a darkly mysterious ground bass with variations, in Purcellian manner. The third movement (Presto) is a vigorous scherzo with a pavan-like trio scored for the strings. The finale is a double fugue based on two very different, contrasting subjects, which Tippett then combines in intricate contrapuntal figuration. At the climax, however, the music falls apart, and the work ends in a wholly unexpected way.
