= Concerto for Double String Orchestra (Tippett) =

Composition by Michael Tippett

Michael Tippett's Concerto for Double String Orchestra (1938–39) is one of his most popular and frequently performed works.

== Background ==
Like other works of the composer's early maturity such as the First Piano Sonata and the First String Quartet, the Concerto is characterized by rhythmic energy and a direct melodic appeal. Representing both a meeting point for many of his early influences and a release for the catalytic experiences that defined the decade after leaving London and the Royal College of Music, the Concerto was an experiment in multiplicities, where the diversity of the thematic material (invented and imported) became synthesized through the timbral unity of the ensemble—two ensembles in fact, a further manifestation of the opposition and divisions contributing to the work’s multi-dimensionality.

Tippett identified the polyrhythms and Northumbrian elements in the piece as coming from the influence of Jeffrey Mark, who he had met while at the RCM. The piece is dedicated to Mark, and Tippett also produced a portrait of Mark in the second variation of the Fantasia on a Theme of Handel: "for war traumatised Jeffrey Mark a jangling explosion of octaves".

As in the 1941 oratorio A Child of Our Time and the Symphony No. 3 of 1973, Tippett's humanitarian concerns are clearly evidenced in his use of melodies deriving from, and referring to, folk and popular musical sources.

Tippett completed the score on June 6, 1939, and it was premiered on April 21, 1940.

== Musical influences ==
The influence of Bartok and Stravinsky can be shown, as well as that of the 17th-century English Madrigal School. From these, and folk-song, Tippett derives his distinctive and personal technique of 'additive rhythm'. This has been described as 'a kind of rhythm the effect of which is determined by an accumulation of irregular, unpredictable accents in the music'. The composer David Matthews describes the effect thus: "[I]t is the rhythmic freedom of the music, its joyful liberation from orthodox notions of stress and phrase length, that contributes so much to its vitality".

== Form and structure ==
By dividing the orchestra into two equal and identical sections Tippett is able to play one off against the other, using syncopation and imitation to add further to the rhythmic vitality and propulsion of the music. This antiphonal effect is similar to that found in Renaissance and early Baroque choral music by composers such as Monteverdi and Gabrieli. The first movement (Allegro con brio) is in sonata form and contrasts a vigorous, driving theme in octaves with a more delicate, lightly scored idea on violins and cellos. The slow movement (Adagio cantabile) opens with one of Tippett's most affecting and heartfelt melodies for low solo violin, revealing the composer's deep love of Blues, especially the singing of Bessie Smith. A fugue offers chromatic contrast, and the movement is rounded off by a return of the opening tune on the solo cello.

In the rondo finale (Allegro molto) Tippett uses a melody generally described as 'based on a Northumbrian bagpipe tune' to bring the work to an exciting and uplifting climax. However this melody, as it appears here, is unlike any traditional Northumbrian bagpipe tune, and, having a compass of two octaves, would be unplayable on the instrument.

=== The tonality ===
- Modal

Tippett uses tonal centres (but they are not related e.g. A and A flat) e.g. the tonal centre of A bars 1-20

=== Textures ===
- There are various textures used throughout the piece. Bars 1-8 is a two-part counterpoint; there is also inverted imitation in bars 8-10. Bars 21-30 is melody-dominated homophony. There is an arpeggio accompaniment from bar 30 onwards.

=== Structure ===
Movement 1 - Allegro con brio

While the movement initially sounds like ritornello form, it is actually in sonata form.

- Exposition:

1st Subject - bars 1-20
2nd Subject - bars 33-67

- Development:

The development section occurs between bars 68 to 128.

- Recapitulation:

Both subjects are heard again, now both based in A.

- Coda

bars 194-232

=== Melody ===
- The melody is based on motifs, e.g. the opening oscillating quaver pattern, bars 21 onwards this is used as an accompaniment.
- The second motif is then in Orchestra 2 - bars 1-4
- Other motifs include the 'trill' motif bar 22-23

=== Harmony ===
- Dissonant e.g. 51, but tonal.
- Some chord based bars 33-35
- Use of some recognisable harmonic features e.g. bar 20-21 a Phrygian cadence (IVb-V in a minor key)

=== Rhythm ===
- Use of syncopation, e.g. bars 68-70
- Use of additive rhythm.

Quaver used as a building block for different rhythmic patterns e.g. bar 15.
