= Fantasia Concertante on a Theme of Corelli =

Orchestral work by Michael Tippett

Fantasia Concertante on a Theme of Corelli, also known as the Corelli Fantasia, is a work for string orchestra by the British composer Michael Tippett. It was commissioned by the 1953 Edinburgh Festival to commemorate the 300th anniversary of the birth of the Italian composer Arcangelo Corelli, and given its first performance on 29 August 1953, in the Usher Hall, by the BBC Symphony Orchestra conducted by Tippett.

Integrating 17th century influences, especially those outside of the orchestral tradition, can be traced back to the composer's days at the Royal College of Music, and to the period immediately after when he took a position conducting amateur choirs in Oxted. Meanwhile his interest in 18th century counterpoint, specifically the fugal process, which would figure prominently and climactically in the latter part of the Fantasia, was the result of his supplementary studies with R. O. Morris, also dating from that period. The Fantasia represents, stylistically and conceptually, Tippett’s most ambitious attempt to create a synthetic composition that anticipates the creative developments that eventually led to the formation of his notional archetype.

== Composition ==
The theme on which the work is based is an Adagio in F minor from Corelli's Concerto Grosso in F, Op. 6, No. 2. There are two distinct ideas: a slow, dragging melody for full strings with much use of suspension in F minor, and a brisk Vivace flourish for two solo violins in C major. In the tradition of the Baroque Concerto Grosso Tippett contrasts a solo group, consisting of two violins and a cello, with the main body of strings. Although he does not use a harpsichord continuo, the writing for lower strings is dense and richly textured, achieving a comparable effect of harmonic fullness. The musical style is characteristic of the composer in the 1950s, combining rigorous, complex polyphony with lyrical radiance and simplicity.

After the opening sequence of seven variations there is a fugue (incorporating part of Bach's organ fugue in B minor on a theme of Corelli) which in turn leads to 'a long slow ascent from darkness into light', in which cascading, swirling violins reach a highly charged, 'overtly erotic'. climax before calming down in a Pastorale section reminiscent of Tippett's opera The Midsummer Marriage.

== Popularity ==
In January 1975 the Corelli Fantasia reached an audience of some 14 million television viewers when it was featured prominently in the film Akenfield, directed by Peter Hall. The ensuing popularity of the work, and of the recording by the Academy of St Martin in the Fields directed by Neville Marriner stemmed directly from this national exposure of a piece thought before then to be complex, over-intellectual and 'difficult'. It is now firmly established as one of Tippett's most popular and frequently performed works, joining other well-loved works for strings by English composers such as Ralph Vaughan Williams and Edward Elgar.
