= King Priam =

Opera by Michael Tippett

- Opera by Michael Tippett
- Librettist: Tippett
- Language: English
- Based on: Homer's Iliad
- Premiere: 29 May 1962; Arts festival in Coventry

King Priam is an opera by Michael Tippett, to his own libretto. The story is based on Homer's Iliad, except the birth and childhood of Paris, which are taken from the Fabulae of Hyginus.

The premiere was on 29 May 1962, at Coventry. The opera was composed for an arts festival held in conjunction with the reconsecration of the rebuilt Coventry Cathedral, for which Benjamin Britten also wrote his War Requiem, which was first performed in the Cathedral the day after the premiere of King Priam.

The first Covent Garden performance was on 5 June, conducted by John Pritchard. It was premiered in Germany at the Badisches Staatstheater in 1963 (in a translation by Walter Bergmann), in Greece at the 1985 Athens Festival, in France at the Opéra de Nancy et de Lorraine in 1988, in Italy at Batignano in 1990, and in the United States San Francisco Opera Center Showcase in 1994. In 2014 the work was revived by English Touring Opera, with a reduced orchestration by Iain Farrington, the first performance of this version being given at the Linbury Studio Theatre at the Royal Opera House on 13 February 2014.

As epigraph to the score Tippett placed the German words "Es möge uns das Schicksal gönnen, dass wir das innere Ohr von dem Munde der Seele nicht abwenden," or, "May Fate grant that we never turn our inner ear away from our soul's lips." These words conclude a 1912 essay on the paintings of Arnold Schoenberg by Wassily Kandinsky.

== Roles ==
Role	Voice type	Premiere Cast, 29 May 1962 (Conductor: John Pritchard)
Priam, King of Troy	bass-baritone	Forbes Robinson
Hecuba, his wife	dramatic soprano	Marie Collier
Hector, their eldest son	baritone	Victor Godfrey
Andromache, Hector's wife	lyric dramatic mezzo-soprano	Josephine Veasey
Paris, Priam's second son	tenor	John Dobson
Paris as a boy	treble	Philip Doghan
Helen, Paris' lover	lyric mezzo-soprano	Margreta Elkins
Achilles, a Greek hero	heroic tenor	Richard Lewis
Patroclus, his friend	light baritone	Joseph Ward
Nurse	mezzo-soprano	Noreen Berry
Old Man	bass	David Kelly
Young Guard	lyric tenor	Robert Bowman
Hermes, messenger of the gods	high light tenor	John Lanigan
Chorus: Hunters, Wedding Guests, Serving-women

== Synopsis ==
=== Act 1 ===
King Priam takes a private view of the events of the Trojan War, focusing on individual moments of moral choice. The opera begins soon after the birth of Paris, when an Old Man prophesies that the baby will grow up to cause his father's death. Queen Hecuba immediately declares that her child must be killed. Priam hesitates, but reflects, "What means one life when the choice involves a whole city?" and gives the baby to the Young Man to be abandoned on a mountainside.

Left alone, the Old Man, the Young Man, and the child's Nurse discuss Priam's choice. These three characters will return throughout the opera to comment on the action from their differing perspectives. Sensing Priam's true feelings the Young Man does not kill the baby, but gives him to shepherds to raise as their own.

Years later, Priam is hunting on the mountain with his eldest son, Hector. Hector attempts to subdue a wild bull, but a strange child leaps onto its back and rides away. The child returns, asks to join Hector among the heroes of Troy, and says his name is Paris. Priam is filled with joy that his secret wish was fulfilled, and he welcomes Paris back to Troy as its prince, whatever the consequences may be. The Nurse and the Old and Young Man observe this reversal with foreboding, but are interrupted by revellers at the wedding of Hector and Andromache. The guests gossip that Hector and Paris never became friendly, and that Paris has left Troy for the court of Menelaus in Sparta.

In Sparta, Paris and Helen have already become lovers. Paris wonders if there is any choice in life at all - he feels pulled irresistibly toward Helen by a force greater than himself. As if in answer to his question, the god Hermes appears, and instructs him to choose between three goddesses: Athene, Hera, and Aphrodite, whose roles are sung by Hecuba, Andromache, and Helen. Athene/Hecuba offers Paris glory in war, Hera/Andromache offers domestic peace, but Aphrodite/Helen simply says his name, and he responds with hers, his choice made unconsciously. The other two goddesses curse him, foretelling the doom he will bring to Troy.

=== Act 2 ===
Troy is under siege. In the city, Hector taunts Paris with cowardice for having run away from Menelaus in battle. Scolded by Priam, the brothers return to the fight together. The Old Man, fearful for Troy, calls on Hermes and asks to be shown Achilles, hero of the Greeks.

Achilles has withdrawn from battle, and the scene in his tent is a peaceful one, as he sings to his friend Patroclus a lyrical song of their home, "O rich soiled land," accompanied by solo guitar. But Patroclus is ashamed that Achilles will not fight, and asks to be allowed to go into battle wearing Achilles' armor, so that the Greeks will take hope from the sight of their greatest warrior. Achilles agrees, and offers a libation to the gods for Patroclus' safety.

Watching invisibly under the protection of Hermes, the Old Man begs the god to warn Priam of the danger, but in Troy, Paris is already announcing to the king that Hector has slain Patroclus in single combat. The father and sons sing a trio of thanks for the victory, but they are interrupted by the chilling sound of Achilles' war-cry, taken up and echoed by the Greek army. Greece's greatest warrior has returned to the field in a berserk fury.

=== Act 3 ===
In Hector's bedchamber, Andromache sits and waits for her husband. She remembers with terror the day Achilles killed her father and brothers. Queen Hecuba enters and tells her to save Hector by going to the walls of Troy and calling him out of battle. Andromache refuses, asking why Priam will not end the war by returning the stolen Helen to her own husband. Hecuba scoffs that no war was fought for a woman: Helen may be the pretext, but the great city of Troy is the Greek's real prize. Helen herself now enters, and Andromache relieves her feelings with a volley of insults. Helen responds with a virtuoso aria claiming that erotic passion is greater than either morality or politics, that her love "touches Heaven, because it stretches down to Hell." Finding no comfort in sisterhood, the three women make separate prayers, each to the goddess she represented in the first act.

Helen and Hecuba go, and a serving-woman enters to ask if she should light the fire for Hector's evening bath. Denying her instinctive knowledge of his death, Andromache answers "Yes...yes," but her slave mockingly echoes "No...no," as the servants are first to hear all the bad news. Andromache runs out in despair, and the serving-woman is joined by a chorus of slaves who comment cynically: "We could tell the story too, the pathetic story of our masters, viewed from the corridor."

Paris brings King Priam the news of Hector's death. Priam curses his surviving son, wishing him dead as well, and Paris goes, swearing not to return until he has killed Achilles in revenge. Alone, Priam weeps that the Old Man years ago spoke only of his own death, not of Hector's. The Old Man, the Young Man, and the Nurse appear and question the king: "One son to live by another's death, is that the law of life you favour?" Priam weakly tries to answer "Yes...yes," but an unseen chorus replies "No...no": his heart's answer.

Hermes guides Priam to Achilles' tent. In a quiet scene, Priam kisses Achilles' hands, "the hands of him who slew my son" and begs to be given Hector's body for burial. Achilles agrees, and the two look ahead to their own deaths: Achilles to be killed by Paris, and Priam to be killed by Neoptolemus, Achilles' son.

Troy is in ruins. Priam refuses to leave his city, and one by one his family leaves him. His last farewell is with Helen, to whom he speaks gently. There is a moment of stillness before Achilles' son appears to strike the killing blow and Hermes, the drama over, departs for Olympus.

== Recordings ==
- 1980: Norman Bailey (Priam), Heather Harper (Hecuba), Thomas Allen (Hector), Felicity Palmer (Andromache), Philip Langridge (Paris), Yvonne Minton (Helen), Robert Tear (Achilles), Stephen Roberts, Ann Murray, David Wilson-Johnson, Peter Hall, Kenneth Bowen, recorded by Decca Records (LDR 73006), with the London Sinfonietta conducted by David Atherton. The recording won the Gramophone magazine's award for contemporary music recordings that year and was re-released on compact disc by Chandos (CHAN 9406/7) in 1995.
- 1985: Rodney Macann (Priam), Janet Price (Hecuba), Omar Ebrahim (Hector), Sarah Walker (Andromache), Howard Haskin (Paris), Anne Mason (Helen), and Neil Jenkins (Achilles), with Kent Opera production directed by Nicholas Hytner conducted by Roger Norrington. Directed for Channel 4 by Robert Lough; released on VHS by Virgin Classics in 1990 and the Kultur label in 1997, and on DVD by Arthaus Musik in 2007.
