= Joseph Stoddart =

English anaesthetist and intensive care specialist (1932–2019)

Joseph Stoddart FRCA, FRCP
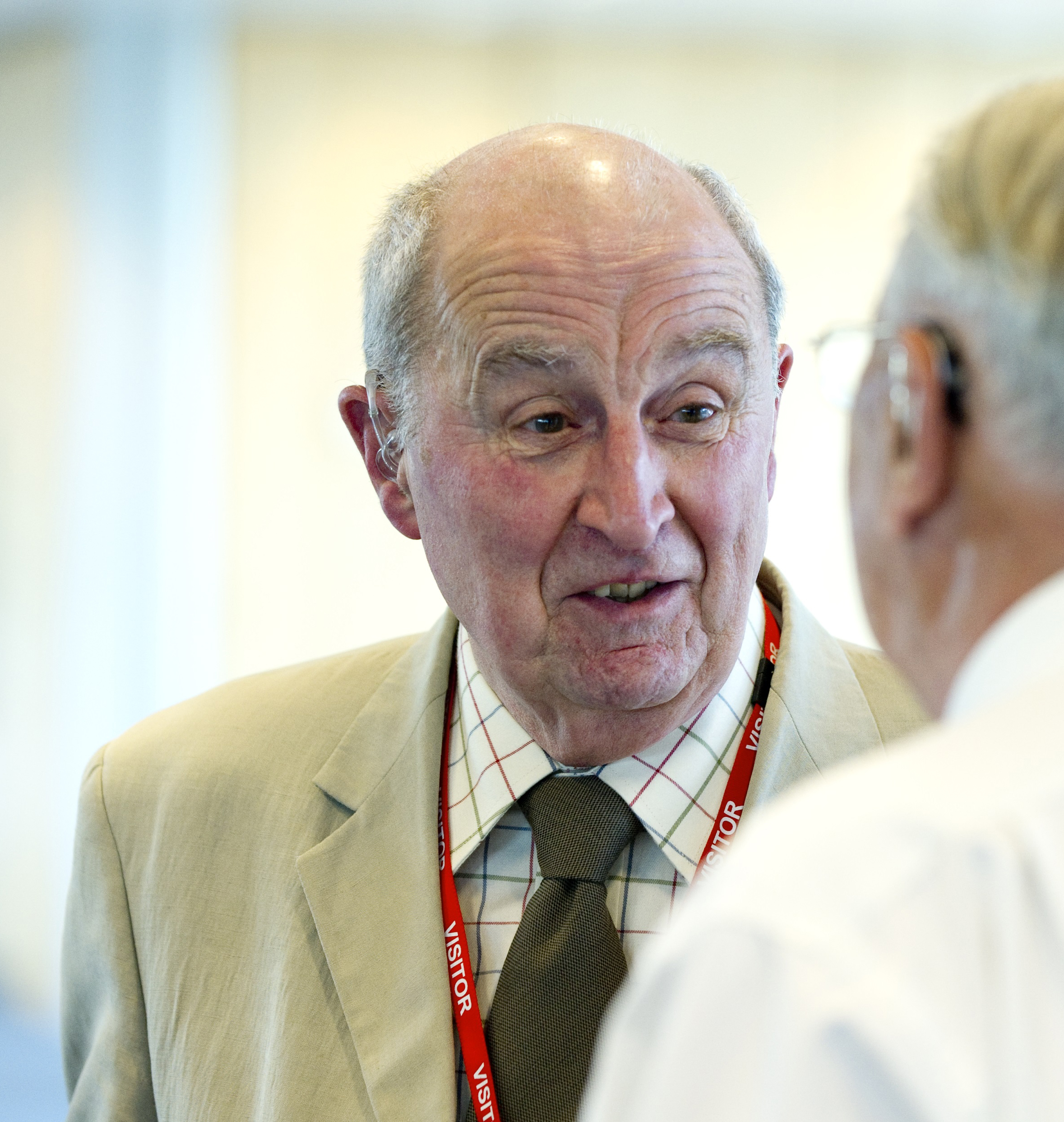
- Stoddart in 2010
- Born: Joseph Charles Stoddart; 18 January 1932; Eston, North Yorkshire, England
- Died: 26 October 2019 (aged 87)
- Education: Durham University
- Occupation: Consultant anaesthetist

Joseph Charles Stoddart (18 January 1932 – 26 October 2019) was an English anaesthetist and intensive care specialist, who played a significant role in the development of intensive care in the UK. He spent most of his career at the Royal Victoria Infirmary in Newcastle upon Tyne, where he established one of the UK's earliest dedicated intensive care units in 1970. He was a founding member and early chair of the Intensive Care Society.

== Early life and education ==
Stoddart was born in 1932 in Eston, North Yorkshire, England. His father was a pharmacist who kept a chemist's shop. He attended Coatham Grammar School and gained his medical qualifications at Durham University. He did his national service in the RAF medical branch (1960–1965), including at the Institute of Aviation Medicine in Farnborough (1963–65).

== Career ==
He had encountered Edgar A. Pask (1912–66) at the Institute of Aviation Medicine, and started working under him at the anaesthesia department of the University of Newcastle upon Tyne in the role of first assistant (senior registrar level), which included managing patients undergoing intensive care. There was then no separate dedicated facility, so such patients were distributed among small side rooms in the hospital. In 1967, after Pask's death, Stoddart became an intensive care and anaesthetics consultant at the Royal Victoria Infirmary, Newcastle upon Tyne, and remained in the position until his retirement in 1995. He was among the earliest consultants to run sessions entirely focusing on intensive care. After the influenza epidemic of 1969, Stoddart designed and built a dedicated intensive care unit (then called an "intensive therapy unit") at the Royal Victoria Infirmary in 1970, one of the first in the country. He wrote a document explaining the purpose of the unit that was issued to all staff.

In 1970, Stoddart was a founding member of the UK Intensive Care Society, and served as their second chairman. He was one of the organising committee of the inaugural World Congress on Intensive Care, held in London in 1974, which attracted around 2000 participants. He was active in R&D and education in the emerging field. In 1975, he published a 200-page book on intensive care, Intensive Therapy (Blackwell), which according to his obituary in The Telegraph, "became essential reading for all entering the field." He also published papers on other topics including respiratory physiology. From the 1970s he gave "Lessons from Intensive Care" at quarterly meetings in Newcastle. In this decade he also collaborated with Douglas Black and others to develop guidelines for recognising brain-stem death, essential for the supply of organs for transplantation, and also served on the working party that revised the earlier recommendations in 1998.

== Awards and legacy ==
Stoddart was acknowledged by the Faculty of Intensive Care Medicine (FICM) as "one of the founding fathers" of the intensive care discipline in the UK, as well as among the "key pioneers" in the north of England by the North of England Intensive Care Society. He received the Gold Medal of the Royal College of Anaesthetists (2000), and was an elected fellow of FICM (2015) and an honorary life member of the Intensive Care Society.

== Personal life ==
His wife was Sally. They married in 1956 and had four children. Their son Jon Stoddart served as Chief Constable of Durham Constabulary.

Stoddart died on 26 October 2019.
