= Anna Batchelor =

British consultant physician

Anna Batchelor MB ChB, FRCA, FFICM
- Education: University of Sheffield
- Occupation: Consultant physician
- Known for: Intensive care medical education

Anna Batchelor is a British consultant physician, best known for her work in intensive care medical education. She was the first female Dean of the Faculty of Intensive Care Medicine between 2013 and 2016 and President of the Intensive Care Society from 2005 to 2007.

== Biography ==
Batchelor studied medicine at the University of Sheffield and qualified as a doctor in 1980. Training in intensive care medicine and anaesthesia followed in Sheffield, Leicester and Newcastle and she has been a consultant since 1993. Batchelor has led curriculum developments in intensive care medicine and anaesthesia.

Batchelor is the current Chair of the Critical Care Leadership Forum and has been a member of Council for the Royal College of Anaesthetists since 2008.
