= Gillbrook Academy =

Location
- Normanby Road; Teesville; Middlesbrough, North Yorkshire, TS6 9AG; England; 54°33′58″N 1°09′44″W

Information
- Type: Academy
- Motto: To make our best better
- Established: 1955
- Closed: 2014 (became Hillsview Academy)
- Department for Education URN: 137709 Tables
- Ofsted: Reports
- Gender: Mixed
- Age: 11 to 19
- Enrolment: 460
- Colours: Black, sky blue and navy
- Publication: Gillbrook Gusto Newsletter
- Website: www.gillbrookacademy.org

Gillbrook Academy (formerly Gillbrook College) was a mixed academy and sixth form in Teesville, Redcar and Cleveland, North Yorkshire. It merged with neighbouring Eston Park Academy in September 2014 and now forms part of a new single Hillsview Academy.

== Location ==
The academy was to the south of Eston Sports Academy on Normanby Road just off the trunk road (A1085) intersection, in the Anglican parish of Christ Church, with both Eston Park Academy, whose playing fields were adjoined, and Redcar & Cleveland Council Town Hall nearby.

== Gillbrook ==
Its students came from Normanby and Teesville, neighbouring towns and villages, and nearby Eston with the latter taking a sizeable part in the school enrolment, which before closure was around 1250, including 400 in the sixth form.

== History ==
=== Grammar school ===
It opened in September 1955 as Eston Grammar School in Teesville with 650 boys and girls. The school motto was Sapera Aude (dare to know).

=== Comprehensive ===
It became known as Gillbrook School in 1973, then Gillbrook Technology College, then Gilbrook College. Between 1994 and 2006, it was a technology college, and in 2009, it became an arts college.

== Notable former pupils ==
=== Gillbrook School ===
- Martin Daniels and his brother Gary, sons of Paul Daniels

=== Eston Grammar School ===
- Professor Harry Elderfield FRS, professor of ocean geochemistry and palaeochemistry since 1999 at the University of Cambridge
- John Elderfield, art historian, and curator at the Museum of Modern Art, New York from 1975 to 2008
- Professor Keith Gull CBE, FRS, professor of molecular microbiology since 2004 at University of Oxford, and principal since 2009 of St Edmund Hall, Oxford
- Professor Robert Sugden FBA, professor of economics since 1985 at the University of East Anglia
