= Edward Donaghy =

Edward Donaghy is the name of:

- Eddy Donaghy (1900–?), English football player and coach, active in the 1920s and 1930s
- Edward Donaghy (referee), American soccer referee active in the 1930s, and a member of the National Soccer Hall of Fame
- Eddie Donaghy, fictional character in the TV show 30 Rock
