= John Donaghy (footballer) =

English football player and manager

Personal information
- Date of birth: 25 December 1895
- Place of birth: Grangetown, England
- Date of death: 31 March 1936 (aged 40)
- Place of death: Groningen, Netherlands

Senior career*
Years	Team	Apps	(Gls)
- Grangetown St Mary's
- South Bank
- Middlesbrough
- Bradford (Park Avenue)

Managerial career
- 1928–1932: ADO Den Haag
- 1932–1933: Hermes DVS
- 1933–1936: Be Quick 1887
- * Club domestic league appearances and goals

John Donaghy (25 December 1895 – 31 March 1936) was an English professional football player and coach who managed Dutch teams ADO Den Haag between 1928 and 1932 and Be Quick 1887 between 1933 and 1936. He played for Grangetown St Mary's, South Bank, Middlesbrough and Bradford (Park Avenue).

His brothers Peter and Ted were also professional players.
