= Trolleybuses in Teesside =

Teesside trolleybus system
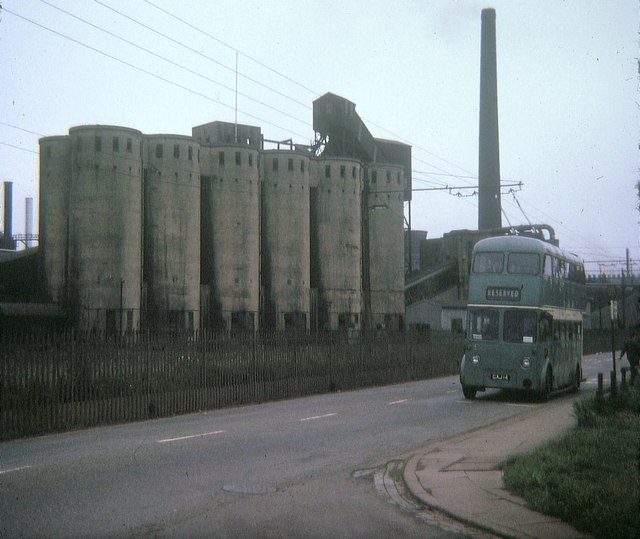
- A Teesside trolleybus passing Dorman Long's Cleveland Iron Works, South Bank, Middlesbrough, July 1970

Operation
- Locale: Teesside, North East England
- Open: 8 November 1919
- Close: 18 April 1971
- Status: Closed
- Routes: 3
- Operator: Tees-side Railless Traction Board

Infrastructure
- Electrification: 550 V DC
- Stock: 21 (maximum)

Statistics
- Route length: 9.2 mi (14.8 km)

The Teesside trolleybus system once served the conurbation of Teesside, in the North East of England. Opened on 8 November 1919, it was unusual in being a completely new system that was not replacing any previously operating tramway network.

By the standards of the various now defunct trolleybus systems in the United Kingdom, the Teesside system was a small one, with a total of three routes, and a maximum fleet of only 21 trolleybuses. However, it was unusually long-lasting, as it did not close until 18 April 1971, and was therefore the penultimate system in the UK to do so.

Three of the former Teesside system trolleybuses are now preserved, one of them at Black Country Living Museum, Dudley, West Midlands, one at the Kirkleatham Old Hall Museum, and the third one near the Trolleybus Museum at Sandtoft, Lincolnshire.

== History ==
North Ormesby, South Bank, Normanby and Grangetown Railless Traction Act 1912
- Act of Parliament
- Parliament of the United Kingdom
- Long title: An Act for incorporating the North Ormesby South Bank Normanby and Grangetown Railless Traction Company and for other purposes.
- Citation: 2 & 3 Geo. 5. c. lv

Dates
- Royal assent: 7 August 1912
Other legislation
Repealed by	Teesside Corporation Act 1971

Status: Repealed

Text of statute as originally enacted

From 1912 Bolckow Vaughan was the main mover behind the North Ormesby, South Bank, Normanby and Grangetown Railless Traction Co., which built a depot at Cargo Fleet, took power (until 1955) from the Bolckow Vaughan's (later Dorman Long) South Bank steel works, erected the first pole at Normanby in July 1915 and had the entire system ready 8 months later, but not the buses, which were held up by wartime shortages.

In December 1918, the company was sold, one-third to Middlesbrough Corporation and two-thirds to Eston Urban District Council. They formed the Tees-side Railless Traction Board. The first trial run was on 19 September 1919. Official opening was at 11am on Saturday 8 November 1919, with chairman of the board, Cllr. W. G. Grace, driving the first bus.

On 1 April 1968, the board merged with Middlesbrough and Stockton to form Teesside Municipal Transport and trolley buses were replaced with diesel buses three years later.

== Services ==
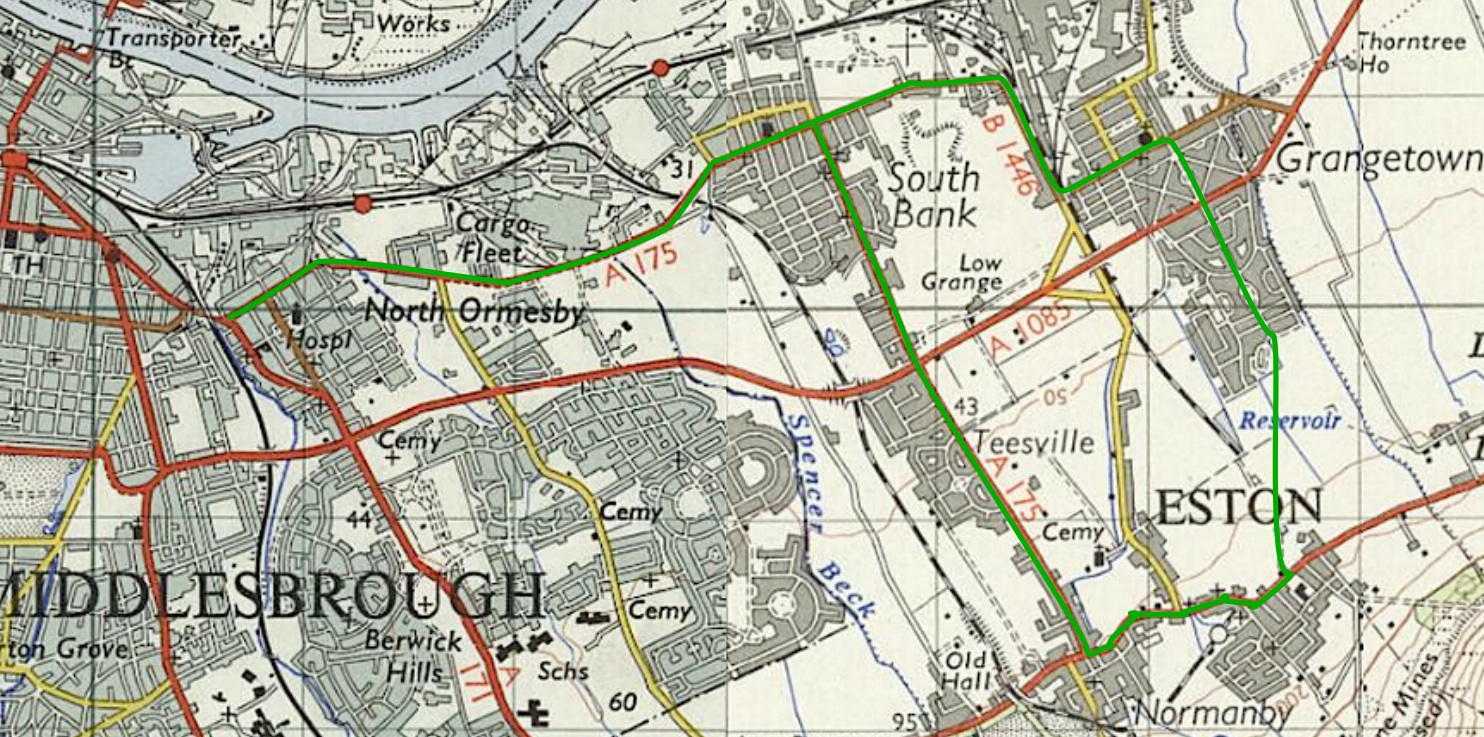
trolleybus route (in green) 1968-1970 - based on 1961 Ordnance Survey map

The original routes were Smeaton Street – North Ormesby – Cargo Fleet – South Bank – Normanby, or Grangetown Market Square. In 1924 the route was extended to its originally intended point in Eston Sq. with a version of a Tilling-Stevens petrol-electric bus patented by the General Manager of the Board (Mr. J. B. Parker), using a trolley to Normanby and then running on petrol to Eston.

Teesside Railless Traction Board (Additional Route) Order Confirmation Act 1961
- Act of Parliament
- Parliament of the United Kingdom
- Long title: An Act to confirm a Provisional Order made by the Minister of Transport under the North Ormesby South Bank Normanby and Grangetown Railless Traction Act, 1912, relating to Teesside Railless Traction Board trolley vehicles.
- Citation: 9 & 10 Eliz. 2. c. xxxv

Dates
- Royal assent: 27 July 1961

Text of statute as originally enacted

Grangetown – Kingsley Road was added in 1951 and further extended to Fabian Road, Eston in 1964 to serve new housing. In 1966 the Eston and Normanby routes were to be linked, but United objected, so the circle was not opened until 31 March 1968; the last UK trolleybus extension. The circle was operated by 10 buses. Changes to the roads in 1970 saw the West Terrace turning circle closed. Its replacement required buses to be reversed into Hampden Street and pulled into Smeaton Street. That, change of ownership and problems of servicing and finding spares, led to closure, with only 8 buses in use at closure on 4 April 1971.

== Trolleybus fleet ==
The first bus was built at the Cargo Fleet depot with a Cleveland Car Co. (Darlington) chassis, English Electric electrical equipment and Dick, Kerr & Co. body.

- 4 RET Construction Co. of Leeds single deck 1917
- 6 Railless single deck 1918
- 6 Brush single deck 1920 (built in 1914 for Rhondda Tramways Company, but used for only 3 months before withdrawal due to poor roads)
- 5 Clough, Smith single deck 1921-1922, using Straker Squire bus chassis
- 1 Tilling-Stevens single deck 1924, hybrid petrol trolleybus
- 8 Sunbeam W 1944-45 rebodied by Roe 1960–62, 4 scrapped 1969
- 7 Sunbeam F4 1950 rebodied by Roe 1962-65
- 5 Sunbeam F4A Burlingham bodied front entrance bought from Reading in 1969

Livery was dark or a pale/mid green, initially with cream above. From 1932 some buses had silver roofs, later painted white. In the 1940s and 50s there were 3 cream bands, later reduced to 2. Some wartime buses were utility grey. The Roman capitals fleetname with shading was replaced in 1932 by a block logo.

== See also ==
- History of Middlesbrough
- Transport in Middlesbrough
- Teesside Municipal Transport
- List of trolleybus systems in the United Kingdom
