= Peter Donaghy =

English footballer (born 1898)

Personal information
- Date of birth: 13 January 1898
- Place of birth: Grangetown, England
- Height: 5 ft 8 1/2 in (1.74 m)
- Position: Forward

Youth career
- Grangetown St Mary's

Senior career*
Years	Team	Apps	(Gls)
1919–1923	Middlesbrough	30	(2)
1923–1925	Bradford City	22	(5)
- Carlisle United
Total		52	(7)

Managerial career
- 1926–1930: Sparta
- 1930–1932: VUC
- 1932–1933: AFC
- * Club domestic league appearances and goals

Peter Donaghy (born 13 January 1898) was an English professional footballer who played as a forward for Middlesbrough, Bradford City and Carlisle United.

== Career ==
Born in Grangetown, Donaghy moved from Grangetown St Mary's to Middlesbrough in August 1919, making his debut (against future club Bradford City) on 24 April 1920. He made a total of 30 appearances for Middlesbrough in the Football League. He joined Bradford City in May 1923. He made 22 appearances in the Football League for Bradford City, scoring 5 goals; he also made 1 appearance in the FA Cup. He joined Carlisle United in June 1925.

After retiring as a player, Donaghy worked as a coach in the Netherlands, managing Sparta, VUC and AFC. He later worked as a steel worker back in his native Teesside.

== Personal life ==
His brothers John and Ted were also professional players.

== Sources ==
- Frost, Terry (1988). Bradford City A Complete Record 1903-1988. Breedon Books Sport. ISBN 0-907969-38-0.
