= Eddy Donaghy =

English football player and coach (1900–1956)

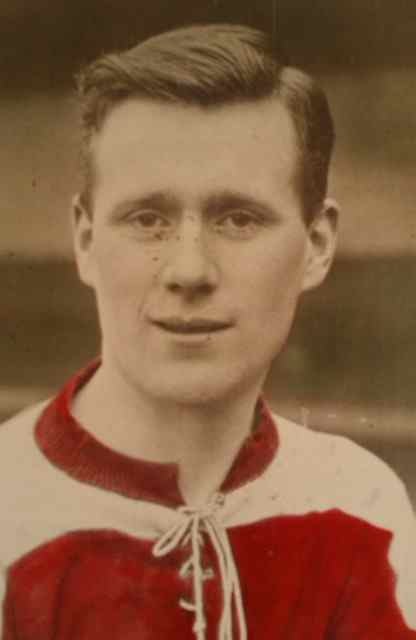
- Donaghy around 1922

Personal information
- Date of birth: 8 January 1900
- Place of birth: Grangetown, England
- Date of death: 30 May 1956 (aged 56)
- Height: 5 ft 8 in (1.73 m)
- Position: Left half

Senior career*
Years	Team	Apps	(Gls)
- Grangetown St Mary's
1922–1923	Middlesbrough	0	(0)
1923–1926	Bradford City	13	(0)
1926–1927	Derby County	6	(0)
1927–1928	Gillingham	4	(0)
- Cannes
Total		23	(0)

Managerial career
- 1931–1935: Feyenoord
- 1936–1937: KFC (Koog aan de Zaan)
- 1947–1950: Velocitas (Groningen)
- 1950–1952: SV Juliana
- * Club domestic league appearances and goals

Edward Donaghy (8 January 1900 – 30 May 1956) was an English football player and coach.

== Playing career ==
Born in Grangetown, Donaghy played for local club Grangetown St Mary's before playing with Football League teams Middlesbrough, Bradford City, Derby County and Gillingham.

Donaghy, a left half, made a total of 13 appearances in the Football League for Bradford City between May 1923 and May 1926.

He left Gillingham in 1928 to play in France, where he played for Cannes alongside fellow Englishman Stan Hillier.

== Coaching career ==
Donaghy coached Dutch side Feyenoord between 1931 and 1935, winning two league titles.

== Personal life ==
Eddy studied in St Mary's College, Middlesbrough. His brothers John and Peter were also professional players.

Donaghy died on 30 May 1956, at the age of 56.
