= Outwood Academy Normanby =

Location
- Normanby Road; Teesville; Middlesbrough, North Yorkshire, TS6 9AG; England; 54.56696°N 1.16174°W

Information
- Type: Academy
- Established: 2014
- Local authority: Redcar and Cleveland
- Department for Education URN: 147544 Tables
- Ofsted: Reports
- Chair of Governors: Elaine Fryett
- Principal: Mark Robinson
- Staff: 128
- Gender: Mixed
- Age: 11 to 16
- Enrolment: 761 as of February 2025
- Capacity: 1,200
- Colours: Purple & black
- Website: normanby.outwood.com

Outwood Academy Normanby (formerly Hillsview Academy) is a secondary school with academy status, located in the Teesville suburb of Middlesbrough, North Yorkshire, England. It has a mixed intake of boys and girls ages 11–16, with 766 pupils on roll as of 2025.

The school is operated by Outwood Grange Academies Trust, and the current principal is Dr Mark Robinson.

== History ==
The school was established as Hillsview Academy on 1 September 2014, through the merger of Eston Park and Gillbrook academies on the Gillbrook site. Although Gillbrook supported the merger, Eston Park opposed it with the proposal prompting parental protests. Both the predecessor schools had been rated as inadequate by Ofsted. Eston Park was placed in special measures on the 22 May 2013 and Gillbrook in serious weaknesses in December 2013. The two schools adopted a joint Governing Board who arranged the merger.

Both predecessor schools and the merged Hillsview Academy were operated by Academies Enterprise Trust (AET).

A 2017 Ofsted report found Hillsview Academy to be "inadequate", noting instances of racism, bullying, truancy and smoking. Hillsview Academy was placed into special measures and in May 2019 AET announced that the school would be transferred to a new sponsor organisation, Outwood Grange Academies Trust (OGAT).

In September 2019 the school was renamed Outwood Academy Normanby and control transferred to OGAT.

The Former sixth form building is due to become "Outwood Alternative Provision Eston" in September 2020.

== Uniform ==
The school's uniform comprises a black school jacket (blazer), white shirt/blouse, black trousers/skirt and tie.
