= Pontypridd Urban District Council Tramways =

Tramway service in Pontypridd between 1904 and 1931

Operation
- Locale: Pontypridd
- Open: 5 March 1905
- Close: 30 August 1931
- Status: Closed

Infrastructure
- Track gauge: 3 ft 6 in (1,067 mm)
- Propulsion system: Electric

Statistics
- Route length: 5.34 miles (8.59 km)

Pontypridd Urban District Council Tramways operated a tramway service in Pontypridd between 1904 and 1931. Part of it used the route of the Pontypridd and Rhondda Valley Tramway Company's horse tramway. Between 1919 and 1927, it was the only system in Wales where through running onto a neighbouring system occurred. In 1930, part of the system was converted to use trolleybuses, and the former horse tramway section was replaced by motor buses in 1931, bringing the tramway era to an end. During the Second World War, a number of trolleybuses were borrowed from other systems, to cope with heavy traffic, but the use of electric vehicles ended in 1957. Most of the vehicles were sold on to other undertakings, and the system was the last in Britain to be run by an urban district council.

== History ==
The Pontypridd and Rhondda Valley Tramway Company had built a horse-drawn tramway between Pontypridd and Porth, which had been authorised in 1882, but had run into financial difficulties in 1887, just before construction was completed. It had been run by Solomon Andrews, a Cardiff entrepreneur, from 1887 until 1890, and was then sold to one of Andrews' companies. In 1898 it was sold to the British Electric Traction Company, but their attempt to get local authority approval to extend and electrify the line failed. The tramway closed unexpectedly in February 1902, when an outbreak of the infectious disease glanders resulted in most of the horses dying.

Both Pontypridd Council and the neighbouring Rhondda Council had their own plans to build and operate electric tramways. In Pontypridd, work began in July 1903, and in August, they were able to use their statutory powers to buy the horse tramway, although the actual sale did not take place until 11 October 1904, when British Electric Traction received £5,750 for it, after which it was divided between the two councils, with the change in ownership occurring at Trehafod. Progress on the new line was good, and the first trial runs were made on 12 February 1905, with an official opening scheduled for March. The first trams ran in public service on 5 March 1905. From near the Pontypridd terminus of the horse tramway, adjacent to the viaduct on the Taff Vale Railway's Rhondda line, the electric tramway ran through the town centre to Treforest railway station. A branch ran from the High Street to Cilfynydd, passing along Market Street and Taff Street before crossing the River Taff and following Coed Pen Maen Road to reach the terminus. Reconstruction of the horse tramway took a little longer, and when it opened on 4 April 1907, there was still no connection between it and the new sections.

The remaining part of the horse tramway opened on 11 July 1908 as part of the Rhondda Tramways Company network, but although the two systems were connected at Trehafod, there was no through running, and passengers had to change trams at the border. On 14 July 1919, an agreement was reached, and through running commenced. One issue that had to be resolved was that each system used local time, which differed by four minutes, and to make timetabling more understandable, both adopted Greenwich Mean Time from that date. The arrangement was not without its problems, however, as there were frequent disagreements between the two operators, and through running was abandoned in December 1927. This was the only example of through running to occur in Wales.

The end of the tramway system came fairly shortly afterwards. Pontypridd UDC had applied for powers to run trolleybuses and motor buses in 1929, and in September 1930, trolleybuses began operating the routes to Treforest and Cilfynydd, although in peak periods, trams or motor buses were used to provide extra capacity. That left just the horse tramway section to Trehafod, which closed on 30 August 1931, bringing tram operation to a close in Pontypridd. Factors affecting the changeover was the heavy cost of maintaining the track in an area affected by mining subsidence, and a downturn in traffic caused by trade depression.

=== Trolleybuses ===
When Pontypridd decided to move from trams to trolleybuses, they announced that it was "the first modern trolleybus system in Wales". The powers obtained in 1929 allowed them to convert all of the routes used by the trams to trolleybus operation. However Rhondda Tramways Company decided that it would not use trolleybuses on the route from Trehafod to Porth, and so Pontypridd used motor buses on the route of the old horse tramway to Trehafod. This left them with a 3.3-mile (5.3 km) route from Cilfynydd in the north, via Pontypridd to Treforest to the east, where there was a depot.

Training of the drivers took place during 1930, but because the addition of a second overhead wire was not completed, the trolleybuses used a single boom to pick up power, and a skate that ran along the tram tracks to complete the circuit. The conversion work was completed for the trolleybus service to begin on 18 September 1930. The new vehicles were initially supplemented by trams and motor buses at peak times, but the advantage of the new mode of transport was that a trolleybus could complete the round trip in 48 minutes, whereas the tram took one hour. For the opening of the service, seven single deck trolleybuses were obtained from English Electric, which were joined by two double deck ex-demonstrators in 1931. One of the ex-demonstrators was a Bristol E-type, one of only two built. Traffic levels during the Second World War were high, and to meet the demand, four Leylands were borrowed from the Kingston upon Hull system until 1942, when they were replaced by four three-axle trolleybuses borrowed from Portsmouth. The loan ended in 1946 when Pontypridd bought a batch of eight double-deck Karrier vehicles. The English Electric vehicles were sold to Cardiff who needed single deck vehicles to operate the route along Bute Street.

Where the trolleybuses crossed the River Taff, the trolley wires were supported by two semi-circular cross-arches, which were adorned with decorative ironwork. The bridge stood next to an ancient hump backed bridge, which was only used by pedestrians. At the Cilfynydd terminus, a turning circle was provided, to prepare the trolleybuses for the return journey, but at Treforest they just reversed into a side street.

Although consideration was given to extending the system in 1939/40, no action was taken, and by the 1950s the system was barely viable. The economics of running such a small system were considered in 1950, and again in 1954, when running a trolleybus cost around three pence per mile more than running a motorbus. Although deferred at the time, a decision was taken in 1955 to close the system. This was scheduled to occur on 31 October 1956, but had to be postponed due to delays in the purchase of replacement motor buses. Two of the Karriers were sold to Walsall in 1956 Trolleybus operation ceased in the following year, on 31 January, with the remaining vehicles sold on to Doncaster and South Shields. It was the last system in Britain to use trolley wheels on the power booms, rather than carbon inserts, and the last system to be run by an urban district council. The closure of the system was not announced publicly, since the sale of the vehicles had already been agreed in principle, and the company did not want souvenir hunters removing small items from the trolleybuses.

== Fleet ==
Trams

The Pontypridd system used a total of 6 single deck and 25 double deck vehicles, bought in five batches.

Car numbers	Type	Year built	Builder
1-6	single deck combination	1904	Brush
7-12	double deck open top	1904	Brush
13-20	double deck open top	1907	Brush
21-26	double deck open top	1908	United Electric Car Company, Preston
13-20	double deck covered	1920	Brush

Trolleybuses

Pontypridd owned a total of 17 trolleybuses during the life of the system, and borrowed eight vehicles during the Second World War to cope with high traffic levels.

Car numbers	Type	In service	Withdrawn	Chassis	Electrical equipment	Bodywork
1-7	single deck 3-axle	1930	1946	English Electric SD6W TB	English Electric	English Electric B32C
8	double deck 3-axle	1931	1946	Guy BTX	Ross-Stevens/BTH	Guy H30/29R
9	double deck 3-axle	1931	1947	Bristol E	BTH	Beadle H32/28R
10-11	double deck	1945	1957	Karrier W	BTH	Weymann UH30/26R
12-13	double deck	1945	1957	Karrier W	BTH	Park Royal UH30/26R
14-15	double deck	1946	1956	Karrier W	BTH	Roe UH30/26R
8-9	double deck	1946	1957	Karrier W	BTH	Park Royal UH30/26R

Guy number 8 and Bristol number 9 had been demonstrators before purchase. Bristol number 9 was one of only two trolleybuses bult by Bristol Commercial Motors. Numbers 1 to 7 were sold to Cardiff after withdrawal in 1946, becoming numbers 231 to 237 on that system. Karriers 14 and 15 were sold to Walsall before the closure of the system and were renumbered 301 and 302. When the system closed, Karriers 10 and 11 went to Doncaster, to become 351 and 352, while Karriers 8, 9, 12 and 13 went to South Shields, where they took the numbers 236 to 239.

The following trolleybuses were borrowed during the Second World War to meet increased traffic levels. Numbers and dates refer to their home system.

Car numbers	Type	In service	Withdrawn	Chassis	Electrical equipment	Bodywork	on loan
Hull 1-4	double deck 2-axle	1937	1952-4	Leyland TB4	MetroVick	Weymann H28/26R	??-1942
Portsmouth 212	double deck 3-axle	1934	1938	AEC 663T	English Electric	English Electric H32/28R	1942-1946
Portsmouth 213	double deck 3-axle	1934	1951	Sunbeam MS3	BTH	English Electric H32/28R	1942-1946
Portsmouth 214	double deck 3-axle	1934	1951	Sunbeam MS3	BTH	Metro-Cammell H32/28R	1942-1946
Portsmouth 215	double deck 3-axle	1934	1951	AEC 663T	English Electric	Metro-Cammell H32/28R	1942-1946

Bus bodywork designations: key
Prefixes

U	Wartime utility bodywork
B	Bus body single deck
C	Coach body single deck
D	Dual purpose single deck
H	Highbridge body, central upper gangway
L	Lowbridge body, offset sunken upper gangway

Numbers

n	Single deck or total seating
x / y	Upper deck followed by lower deck seating

Suffixes

C	Centre entrance
F	Front entrance
R	Rear entrance
D	Dual entrance

== Bibliography ==
- Gould, Peter (2006). "Pontypridd UDC 1905-1986". www.petergould.co.uk. Archived from the original on 20 February 2010.
- Green, Geoff (November 1984). Bus Monographs: 4 - Bristol K-Type. Shepperton: Ian Allan. ISBN 0-7110-1424-8. CX/1184.
- Joyce, J (1963). Trolleybus Trails. Ian Allan.
- Joyce, J; King, J S; Newman, G (1986). British Trolleybus Systems. Ian Allan. ISBN 978-0-7110-1647-7.
- Klapper, Charles (1974). The Golden Age of Tramways. David & Charles. ISBN 978-0-7153-6458-1.
- Turner, Keith (1996). The Directory of British Tramways. Patrick Stephens. ISBN 978-1-85260-549-0.
- Large, Robert (1977). Passenger Tramways of Pontypridd. Oakwood Press. ISBN 978-0-8536-1208-7.
