= Greater Eston =

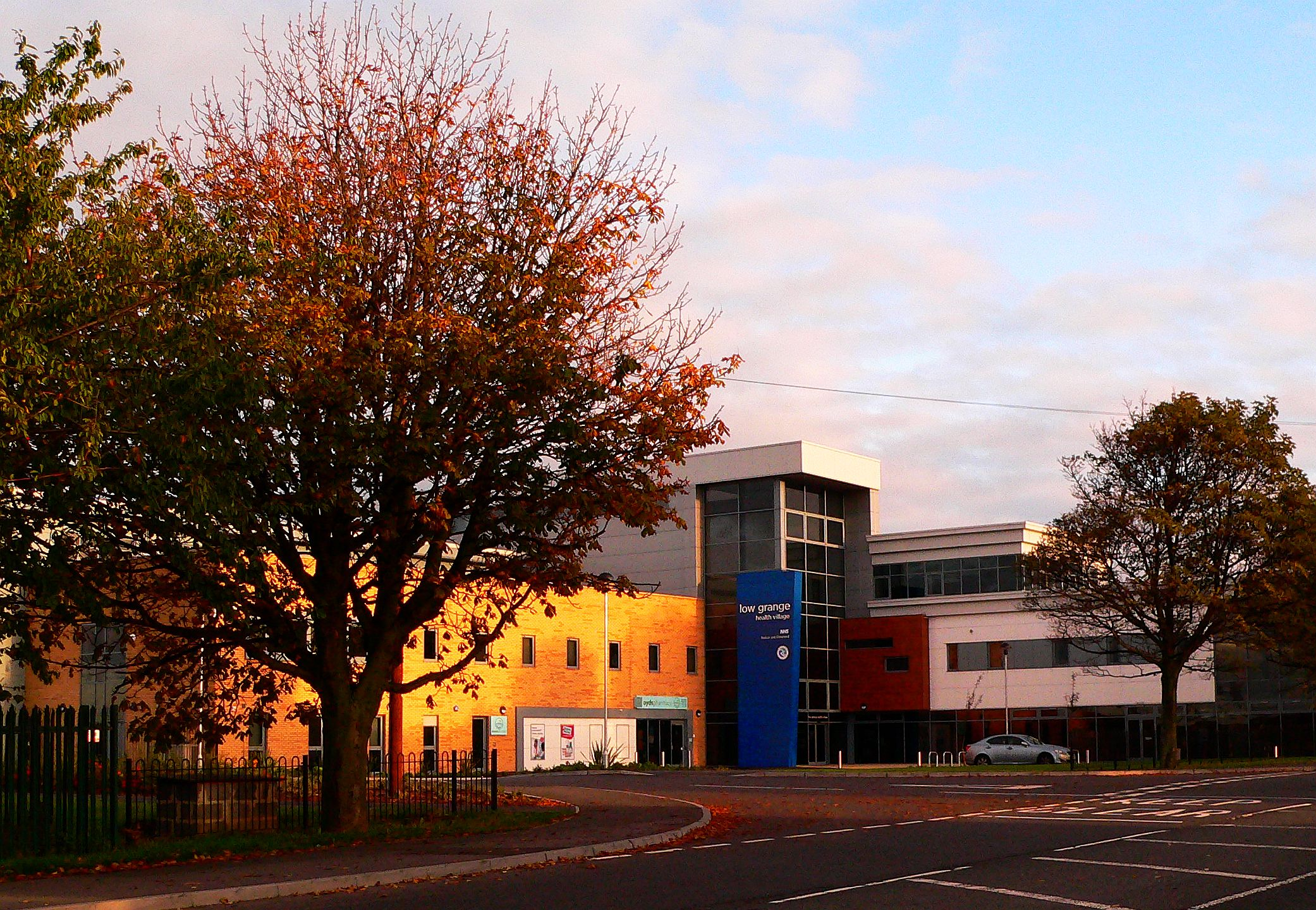
Greater Eston's flagship Low Grange Health Village

Greater Eston is an urbanised area in the unitary authority of Redcar and Cleveland in the ceremonial county of North Yorkshire, England. The name of Greater Eston is a concept devised by town planners from Redcar and Cleveland Council. It cannot be found on any maps, nor does it leave a trail of evidence in history. The idea of Greater Eston is one of unifying an area with separate, if sometimes merging, or crumbling, identities. This is an urban regeneration project and is still mostly on the drawing board.

It has elements which include The Great Street, The Great Park, an Urban Village and so on. It will constitute the areas of Eston, Grangetown, Normanby, Ormesby, South Bank and Teesville. The proposed Greater Eston is immediately to the east of the borough of Middlesbrough, and forms part of the Middlesbrough conurbation.

The area, with the addition of Ormesby, is designated by the ONS as the Eston and South Bank urban subdivision of the Tees Valley urban area, which according to the 2001 census had a population of 32,788.

A Supplementary Planning Document for the Low Grange Farm development, that is, a document outlining the main proposals, was published in 2008. By 2010, the Health and Social Care Village was opened.
