= Rhondda Tramways Company =

Welsh tramway operator

Operation
- Locale: Rhondda
- Open: 31 October 1904
- Close: 1 February 1934
- Status: Closed

Infrastructure
- Track gauge: 3 ft 6 in (1,067 mm)
- Propulsion system: Electric

Statistics
- Route length: 20.92 miles (33.67 km)

Rhondda Tramways Company operated a tramway service in Rhondda, Wales, between 1904 and 1934.

== History ==
The Pontypridd and Rhondda Valley Tramway Company had built a horse-drawn tramway between Pontypridd and Porth, which had been authorised in 1882, but had run into financial difficulties in 1887, just before construction was completed. It had been run by Solomon Andrews, a Cardiff entrepreneur, from 1887 until 1890, and was then sold to one of Andrews' companies. In 1898 it was sold to the British Electric Traction Company, but their attempt to get local authority approval to extend and electrify the line failed. The tramway closed unexpectedly in February 1902, when an outbreak of the infectious disease glanders resulted in most of the horses dying.

Both Rhondda Urban District Council (UDC) and the neighbouring Pontypridd UDC had their own plans to build and operate electric tramways, but whereas Pontypridd obtained powers to run their part of the tramway themselves, the Rhondda Tramways Act 1902 specifically prevented Rhondda UDC from operating their tramway. Having bought the section of the horse tramway from Porth to Trehafod, they asked the National Electric Construction Company to build the line in February 1903, and on 14 April 1906, a subsidiary company, the Rhondda Tramways Company, was established to act as the operator of the system. Rhondda UDC leased the tramway to them for £2,250 per year.

When the system first opened, it consisted of two lines. Both began at Trehafod and followed the route of the horse tramway to Porth. Here, the two routes divided, with one going west and then north, along the Rhondda Fawr Valley, to reach a terminus at Partridge Road. The second ran north and then west, along the Rhondda Fach Valley to Pont-y-Gwaith. Each was about 4 miles (6.4 km) long, with a single track. The company bought a fleet of 50 open-top tramcars from Brush Electrical Engineering Company, which were stabled in a depot at Porth. Electric power was obtained from the Rhondda Tramways Electric Supply Company, which was also a subsidiary of the National Electric Construction Company, and public services began of 11 July 1908.

Expansion of the network occurred fairly rapidly, and its length had more than doubled to 18.25 miles (29.37 km) by late 1908. On 2 September, the Rhondda Fach route was extended from Pont-y-Gwaith to Ferndale, and on the same day, the Rhondda Fawr route was extended from Partridge Road to Pentre. Ten days later, on 12 September, this route was extended again, from Pentre to Treherbert. A second route between Porth and Partridge Road opened on 5 November, passing through Penygraig and Tonypandy, on the south side of the River Rhondda. After a short break, three more short extensions completed the system on 30 March 1912. The Rhondda Fach route was extended from Ferndale to Maerdy, the Rhondda Fawr route was extended from Treherbert to Tynewydd, and a short branch from Penygraig to Williamstown was opened. The extra milage resulted in four additional double-deck tramcars being purchased from Brush in 1913, but unlike the earlier vehicles, the upper deck was covered. This proved sufficiently popular with passengers that a programme of fitting covers to the older tramcars began, and by the end, most had been upgraded.

During horse tramway days, it had been possible to travel from Porth to Pontypridd, but although the Rhondda Tramway joined up with the Pontypridd Tramway at Trehafod, there was no through running between the systems, so passengers had to change trams at this point. However in July 1919 the two companies reached an agreement, and through running began on 14 July. One issue was that each used local time for their timetables, which differed by four minutes, but this was resolved by both adopting Greenwich Mean Time. The joint venture did not go particularly smoothly, however, as there were regular disagreements between the two companies, and the practice was abandoned in December 1927.

From August 1920, the company began to run motor buses, initially from Tonypandy along Clydach Vale, using ex-War Department lorries fitted with seats, and the number of buses increased steadily. On 31 December 1933, the tram routes along Rhondda Fawr were replaced by buses, and the Rhondda Fach route closed on 1 February 1934, bringing the tramway era to an end. To reflect this change, the company changed its name to the Rhondda Transport Company in June 1934. One factor which affected the changeover was the high costs of maintenance, in an area which was subject to mining subsidence. Tracks would gradually spread, until a derailment took place, or would burst out of the ground. In some cases, up to 9 inches (230 mm) of rail had to be removed to allow the tracks to lay flat again.

=== Trolleybuses ===
Rhondda holds the distinction of operating the shortest-lived trolleybus system in Britain. The neighbouring Llantrisant and Llantwit Fardre Rural District Council had obtained an act of Parliament in 1912 to authorise a light railway to link Tonyrefail and Gilfach Goch to Williamstown, which was served by trams from 30 March 1912. The railway would have been around 4.75 miles (7.64 km) long. At a time when shafts were being regularly sunk to open up new coal mines, there was a need for a flexible transport system to service the new pits, but extending and diverting a tramway was too expensive for this to be viable. The opening of additional pits at Glifach Goch in 1911 and 1912 resulted in a proposal to run a connecting motor bus service from Williamstown to the area. However, the manager and engineer for Rhondda Transport, H. J. Nisbett became interested in railless traction, and after a visit to the newly-opened Rotherham trolleybus system, he succeeded in persuading the council that this was a better solution.

A bill was submitted to Parliament to authorise the scheme, and once the issue of responsibility for the maintenance of roads had been resolved, it became the Rhondda Tramways (Railless Traction) Act 1913 (3 & 4 Geo. 5. c. lxi) on 15 August 1913. From the Williamstown tram terminus, the route would follow the Penrhiwfer Road, now the B4278, southwards to Tonyrefail, from where it would turn to the west along Gilfach Road, now part of the B4278 and A4093 roads, and then run northwards past Gilfach railway station to the parish boundary between Llantrisant and Rhondda. The total length of the route was about 4.75 miles (7.64 km), and for part of the distance, it followed the authorised course of the light railway. P. E. Stanley, the chief engineer for the National Electric Construction Company, researched the merits of the three methods of current collection then available. These were the Cedes-Stoll system, the Lloyd-Kohler system as used in Stockport, and the RET system, as produced by RET Construction Company, formerly the Railless Electric Traction Company, with its twin spring-loaded trolley poles. The first two systems both used a small trolley running on two parallel wires, with a flexible wire to the vehicle, and Stanley discounted the first, but elected for the second, despite the similarities between them.

The tramway company placed an order for six vehicles with Brush Electrical Engineering Company, which were cascaded with an order for three or four similar vehicles for the Mexborough and Swinton Traction Company. Despite their adoption of Stanley's report, they persuaded Brush to modify the system of current collection to be similar to the RET system, with its twin trolley poles. This enabled them to run the trolleybuses from the depot to the start of the route along the tram lines, using one of the trolley poles and a skate that ran along the tramway rails. Public trolleybus services are thought to have started on 22 December 1914, Four weeks later, the tramway company were concerned about the amount of damage caused to the vehicles by the poor state of the Gilfach Road, and on 4 February 1915, they were debating withdrawal of the service. However, Llantrisant Council stated that repairs to the road were in hand, and the service continued for a while. In March, the driver of car number 56 lost control while descending a hill, and the trolleybus crashed into a house. Services were suspended until further notice, but trolleybuses were never used again on the route. A motor bus service began on the trolleybus route in January 1921. The trolleybuses were sold to Clough Smith for £2,800 in May 1920, and shortly afterwards were bought for further use on the Teesside system.

== Fleet ==
Trams

Rhondda Tramways owned a total of 54 double deck trams, bought in two batches from Brush.

Car numbers	Type	Year built	Builder
1-50	double deck open top	1908	Brush
51-54	double deck covered	1913	Brush

Trolleybuses

Rhondda Tramways bought six trolleybuses from Brush for the opening of the service. They ran for less than three months, and were sold via Clough Smith for further use on Teesside, where they carried the numbers 11 to 16.

Car numbers	Type	In service	Withdrawn	Chassis	Electrical equipment	Bodywork
1-6	single deck rear entrance	1914	1915	Daimler	Brush	Brush B28R

Bus bodywork designations: key
Prefixes

U	Wartime utility bodywork
B	Bus body single deck
C	Coach body single deck
D	Dual purpose single deck
H	Highbridge body, central upper gangway
L	Lowbridge body, offset sunken upper gangway

Numbers

n	Single deck or total seating
x / y	Upper deck followed by lower deck seating

Suffixes

C	Centre entrance
F	Front entrance
R	Rear entrance
D	Dual entrance

== Bibliography ==
- Joyce, J (1963). Trolleybus Trails. Ian Allan.
- Joyce, J; King, J S; Newman, G (1986). British Trolleybus Systems. Ian Allan. ISBN 978-0-7110-1647-7.
- Klapper, Charles (1974). The Golden Age of Tramways. David & Charles. ISBN 978-0-7153-6458-1.
- Turner, Keith (1996). The Directory of British Tramways. Patrick Stephens. ISBN 978-1-85260-549-0.
