= Pontypridd and Rhondda Valley Tramway =

Tramway operator in Wales

Operation
- Locale: Porth, Pontypridd
- Open: November 1887
- Close: February 1902
- Status: Closed

Infrastructure
- Track gauge: 3 ft 6 in (1,067 mm)
- Propulsion system: Horse

Statistics
- Route length: 3.06 miles (4.92 km)

The Pontypridd and Rhondda Valley Tramway operated a tramway service in Pontypridd and Porth between 1888 and 1902.

== History ==
The Pontypridd and Rhondda Valley Tramway Company was incorporated by the Pontypridd and Rhondda Valley Tramways Order 1882, which authorised the construction of a link between the town of Pontypridd and the village of Treherbert in Glamorgan. The two termini are about 12 miles (19 km) apart, but the line as built only ran from Pontypridd for 3.06 miles (4.92 km) to the village of Porth. By October 1887, the company was experiencing financial difficulties, and they asked Solomon Andrews to complete the construction of the line, and then to run it for three years. Andrews was an entrepreneur from Cardiff, who had built a large commercial empire, which included coachbuilding and transportation. He began building buses in the 1870s, and in 1882 he obtained a patent for a horse-drawn omnibus that could run on tramway rails. He ran bus services in several British towns, and ran street tramways in Cardiff and Newport, as well as the Pontypridd tramway.

The company had hoped to open the line on 2 November 1887, but Andrews did not agree to run the line early enough to meet this deadline, and it probably opened later in November, although the exact date has not been recorded. The line was single track, with the western terminus at The Square in Porth. It followed a course which is now the A4058 road towards Pontypridd, ending near the viaduct which carried the Taff Vale Railway's Rhondda line. This structure prevented the tramway, with its double deck cars, from continuing onwards to the town centre.

After three years of operation, the company was still in financial difficulties, and was bought out by another company owned by Andrews, the South Wales Machinery and Carriage Company, in 1890. They ran it for another eight years, and then sold it to the British Electric Traction Company, who were building up a portfolio of tramways. Their policy was to seek local authority agreement to electrify and extend the lines they took over, but in this case they were unsuccessful. The services ran for another two years, but ended abruptly, probably in February 1902, when an outbreak of the infectious disease glanders resulted in most of the horses dying. The councils of Pontypridd and Rhondda were both hoping to build their own tramways, and Pontypridd obtained statutory powers in the Pontypridd Urban District Council Act 1903 (3 Edw. 7. c. cxv) to buy the line in August 1903. British Electric Traction received £5,750 on 31 October 1904, and the two authorities each took over a section of the line, which they upgraded to run electric trams. Despite the fact that the two systems were linked at Trehafod, passengers had to change cars at that point, and it was not until 14 July 1919 that through running was again possible. This also required an adjustment to timekeeping, as both systems used local time, which differed by four minutes, but was resolved by both adopting Greenwich Mean Time.

== Closure ==
The local authorities in Pontypridd and Rhondda purchased the tramway in 1904 and divided it between them to operate Pontypridd Urban District Council Tramways and Rhondda Tramways Company.

== Bibliography ==
- Klapper, Charles (1974). The Golden Age of Tramways. David & Charles. ISBN 978-0-7153-6458-1.
- Turner, Keith (1996). The Directory of British Tramways. Patrick Stephens. ISBN 978-1-85260-549-0.
