= Eston Park Academy =

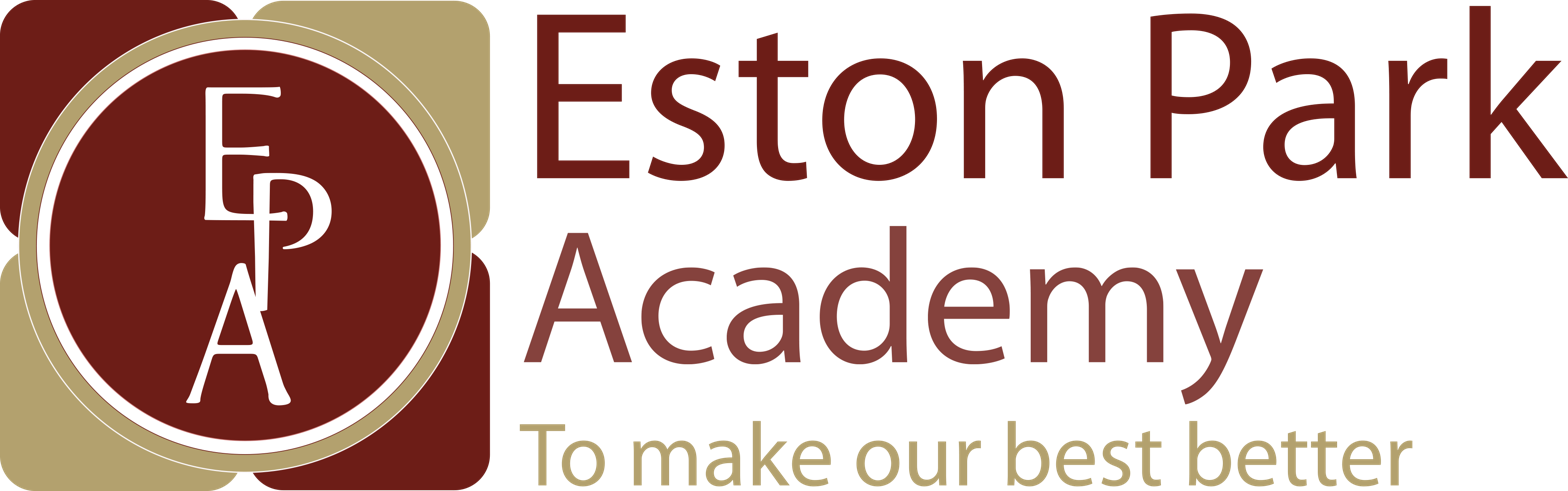

Location
- Burns Road; Teesville, Middlesbrough, North Yorkshire, TS6 9AW; England
- Coordinates: 54°33′58″N 1°09′32″W

Information
- Type: Academy
- Motto: Endeavour, Progress, Achievement
- Closed: 2014
- Department for Education URN: 137816 Tables
- Ofsted: Reports
- Gender: Mixed
- Age: 11 to 19
- Houses: Durham, Lincoln, Ripon, York and Normanby
- Website: estonpark.co.uk

Eston Park Academy (formerly Eston Park School) was a mixed academy and sixth form in Teesville, Middlesbrough, North Yorkshire, England. It merged with neighbouring Gillbrook Academy in September 2014 and now forms part of a new single Hillsview Academy. The new merged academy is run by the Academies Enterprise Trust (as were the two former schools).

It had five houses: Durham, Lincoln, Ripon, York and Normanby (the house for the Sixth Form).

== History ==
Sarah Metcalfe Comprehensive School on Burns Road, a former secondary modern school, and Stapleton secondary school merged in 1991 and became Eston Park School. On 31 January 2018, a large fire occurred, which is believed to have started in the Lincoln house area. No injuries were reported as the school had been closed since 2014. Cleveland Fire Brigade were called to the scene at 7:15 PM and controlled the fire around 10PM. Hillsview Academy was not affected.

== Ofsted and academic achievement ==
In December 2009, the Ofsted report rated the school as "good", one that "provides a good standard of education and one that is improving under the positive leadership of the headteacher". Ofsted stated that "the school is determined that all students should be enabled to fulfil their dreams by developing into the business and community leaders of tomorrow". In May 2013 the school was judged inadequate by Ofsted.

On 1 January 2012, the school became an academy. Neighbouring Gillbrook College also become an academy and was renamed Gillbrook Academy.

== Notable former pupils ==
=== Sarah Metcalfe Comprehensive School ===
- Mark Benton, actor
