= Lackenby =

Village in North Yorkshire, England

Coordinates: 54°34′N 1°08′W

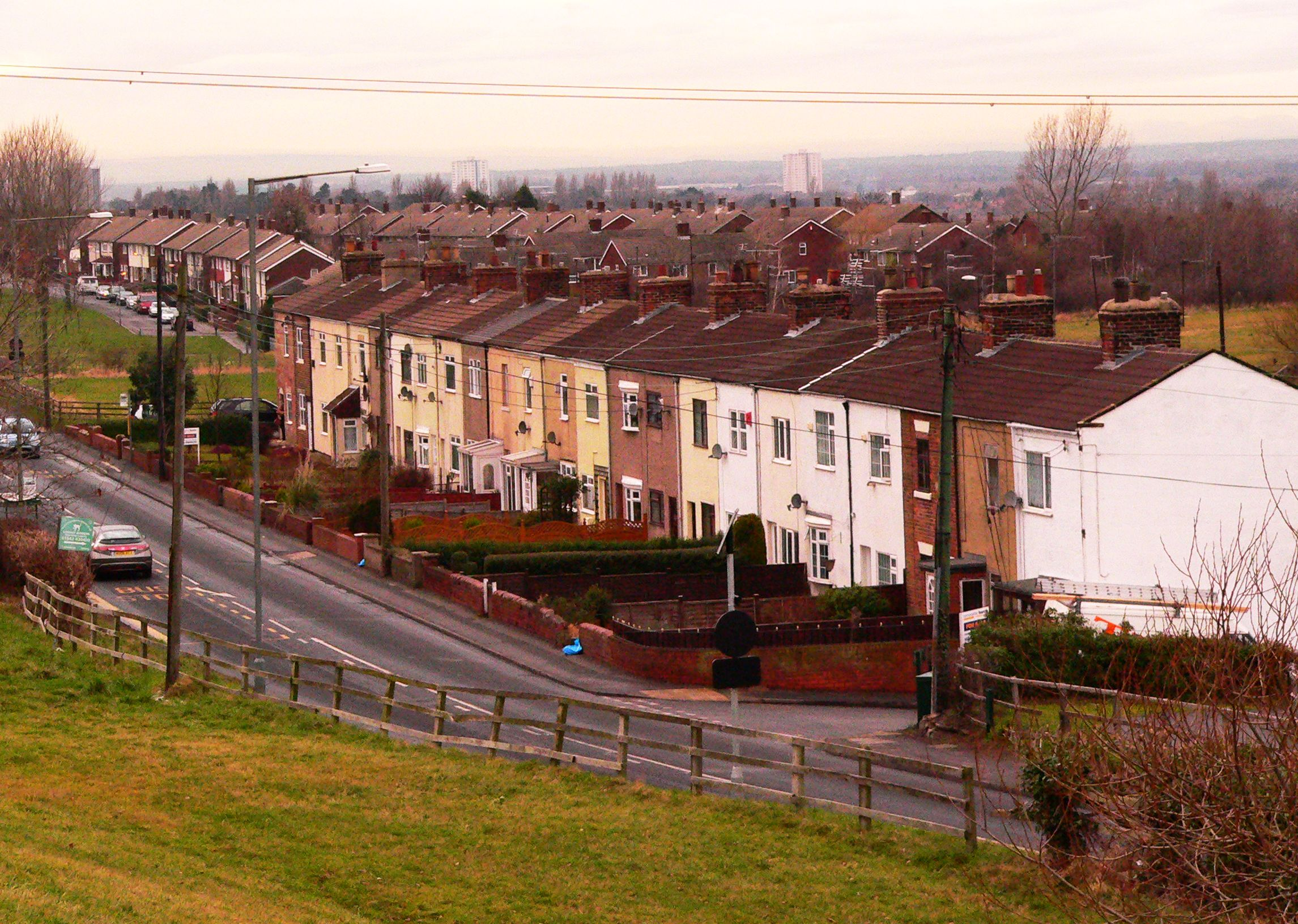
The row of former miners' terraces in Lackenby.

Lackenby is a small village in Redcar and Cleveland, North Yorkshire, England. It is situated to the immediate east of Eston and Middlesbrough and immediately to the west of Lazenby.
