= Teesville =

Area of Redcar and Cleveland borough, North Yorkshire, England

Coordinates: 54.565°N 1.163°W

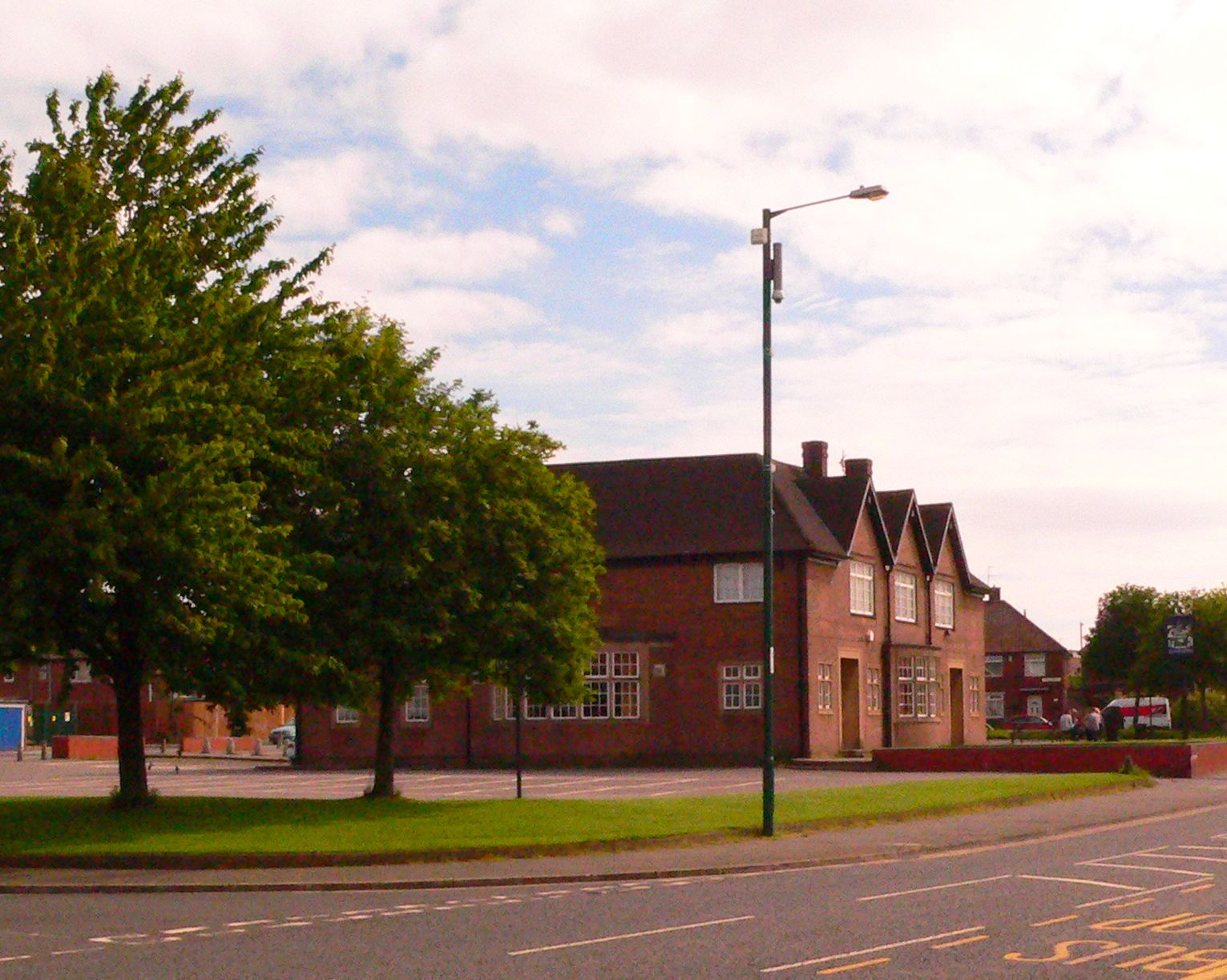
- The Eston Hotel

- Location within North Yorkshire
- Population: 6,517 (Ward 2011)
- OS grid reference: NZ545195
- Unitary authority: Redcar and Cleveland
- Ceremonial county: North Yorkshire
- Region: North East
- Country: England
- Sovereign state: United Kingdom
- Post town: MIDDLESBROUGH
- Postcode district: TS6
- Dialling code: 01642
- Police: Cleveland
- Fire: Cleveland
- Ambulance: North East
- UK Parliament: Redcar

Teesville is an area in the borough of Redcar and Cleveland, North Yorkshire, England. It is part of Greater Eston, which includes the area and the settlements of Eston, Normanby, South Bank, Teesville and part of Ormesby.

== Demographics ==
A ward covering the area had a population of 6,517 at the 2011 census.

== Politics ==
Teesville is part of the Redcar constituency in the House of Commons.

=== 2023 local elections results ===
In the 2023 local elections, the following members were returned to Redcar and Cleveland Borough Council:

Ward	Councillor	Party
Teesville	Peter Chaney	Labour Party
Teesville	Robert Clark	Labour Party
Teesville	Margaret O'Donoghue	Labour Party

== Municipal buildings ==
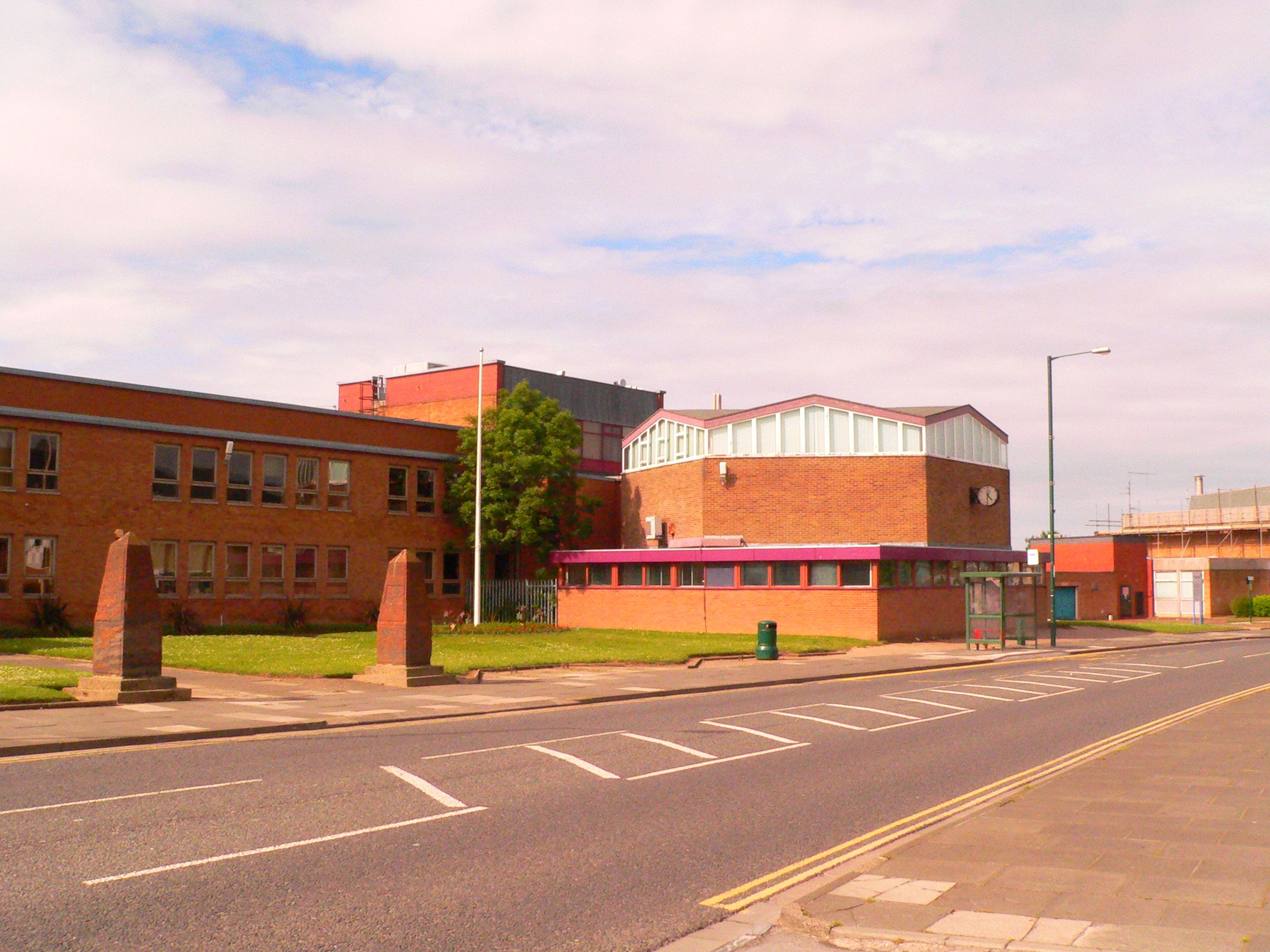
Redcar and Cleveland Town Hall prior to its demolition in 2012

Eston Town Hall, in Teesville, was used by the Eston Urban District council from 1961 to 1968. When the County Borough of Teesside was abolished in 1974, the Borough of Langbaurgh, as part of the secord tier of local government within Cleveland County, used the town hall for the borough. The borough changed its name in 1988 to Langbaurgh-on-Tees and, as a unitary authority, after the abolition of Cleveland County, to Redcar and Cleveland in 1996.

The building departed from the neo-Gothic style of town halls in the area, having a modern 1960's design. The town hall closure also provided an environmental boost, as it was the authority's worst-performing building for carbon dioxide emissions.

It was demolished in 2012; civic facilities were relocated nearby. The political meetings took place at Inspire 2 Learn, formerly Eston's City Learning Centre, also in Teesville, on Normanby Road.

The leader and deputy leader's office, together with offices for political groups, were temporarily moved there until new facilities become available within the £31 million Redcar Leisure & Community Heart scheme. In addition, the mayor's office was temporarily relocated to Redcar's Kirkleatham Museum, before also switching to Redcar centre in 2013.

== Schools ==
Outwood Academy Normanby is a secondary school on the same site as the defunct civic centre. The school was formed from a merger of two secondary schools on the same site – Gillbrook Academy (which opened in 1955 as Eston Grammar School) and Eston Park Academy.

Teesville Primary School. Is an amalgamation of two separate schools, one providing for EYFS and Key Stage 1, and a separate Junior School catering for Key Stage 2. The new EYFS to KS2 school was devised as an extension of the Ofsted "outstanding" Teesville Infants School. The present school opened in 2014 and a short Oftsed inspection in 2019 graded it as a "Good" school, stating : "Teesville Primary School is a happy, vibrant community. The pupils are confident, enthusiastic and keen to learn. The vast majority enjoy coming to school. They work well together. They are well-mannered and respectful. You are clear with parents and pupils about the importance of good attendance. You celebrate attendance with pupils and have recently begun to work more closely with parents and carers to ensure that pupils attend school regularly. However, the proportion of pupils who are regularly absent from school is above the national average. Leaders need to continue to challenge and support parents to improve this.

== Churches ==
The Catholic parish of St Andrew was formed in 1962. The parish church, built by architect Frank Swainston, and church hall stand together on Fabian Road.

St George's Church is nearby and was also built in the 1960s. It shows a triangular design with a long sloping roof almost to the ground on one side. It forms half of the team parish of two Anglican churches – the other being the much more traditionally designed Christ Church, in Eston.

== Nearby places ==
A small brick building next to the Eston Sports Academy has a history unknown to most locals. It was originally the North Riding of Yorkshire's Grangetown Area Control, a communications centre during the Cold War and opened in 1954. The control was closed in 1968 after the Civil Defence Corps was disbanded.

In the 1980s the building was not re-used; a room in the Redcar and Cleveland (then Langbaurgh) Town Hall was used instead.

== Photos of Teesville ==
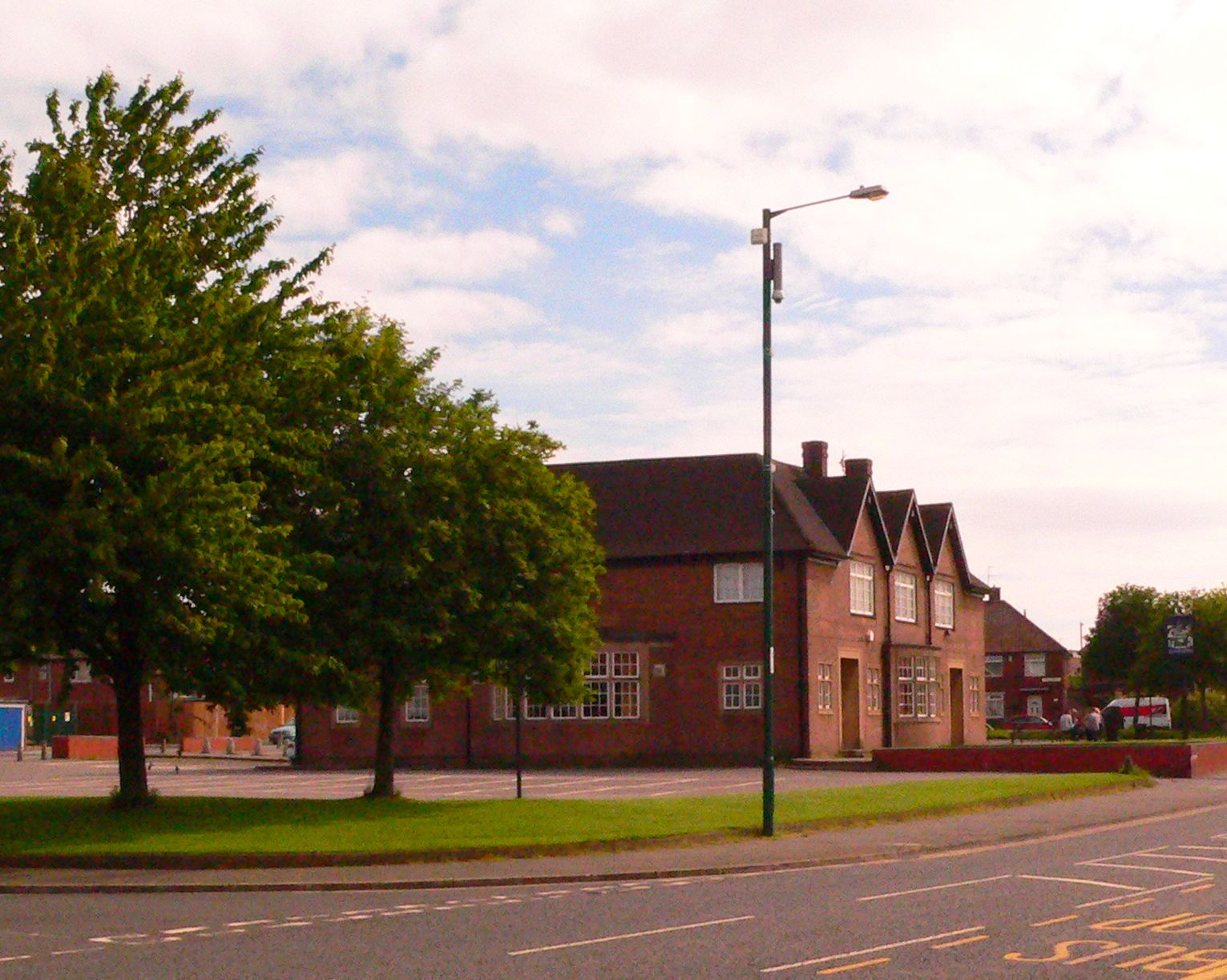
The Eston Hotel is the only pub in Teesville.

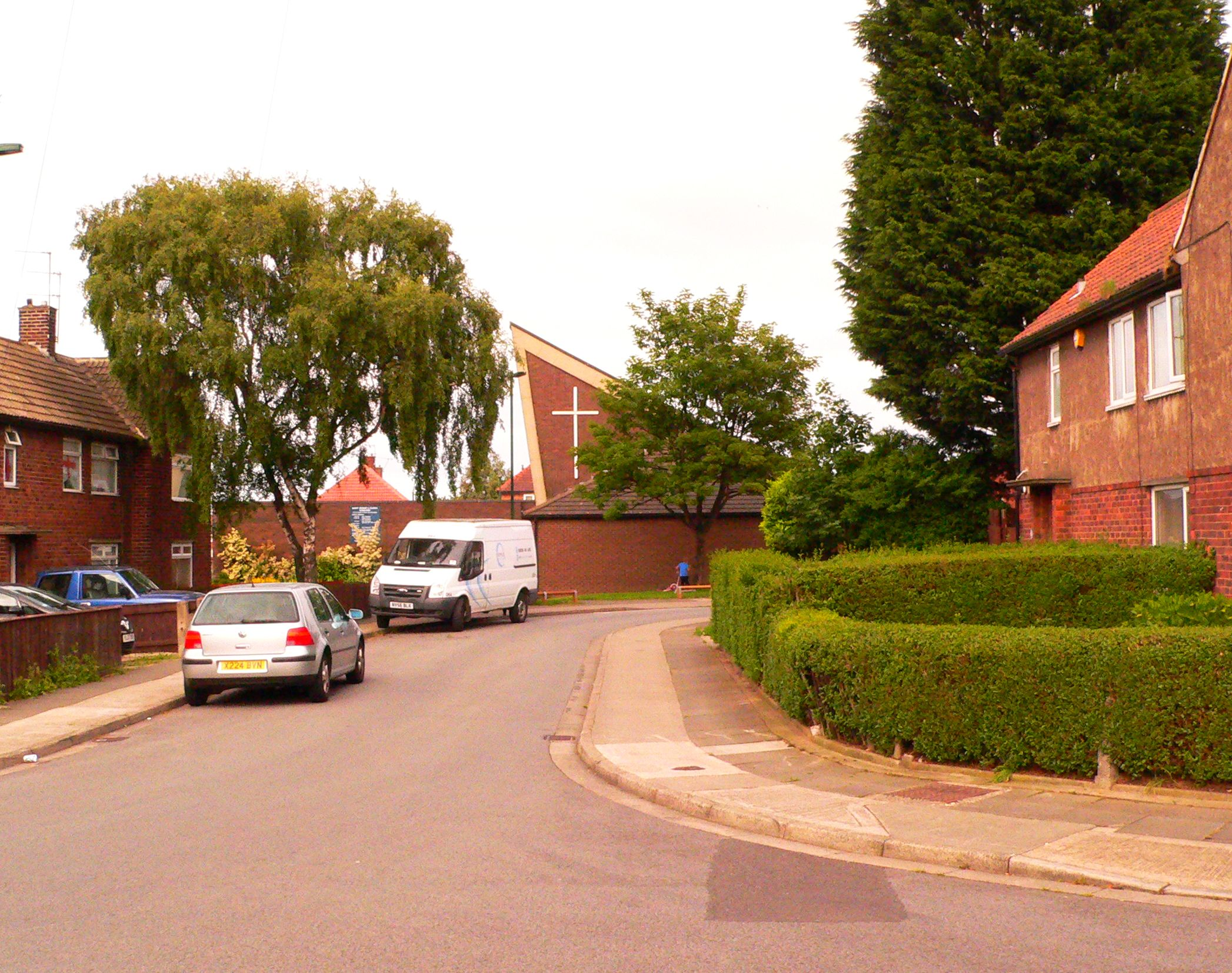
St George's Church, Teesville, works with its team parish of Christ Church, Eston.

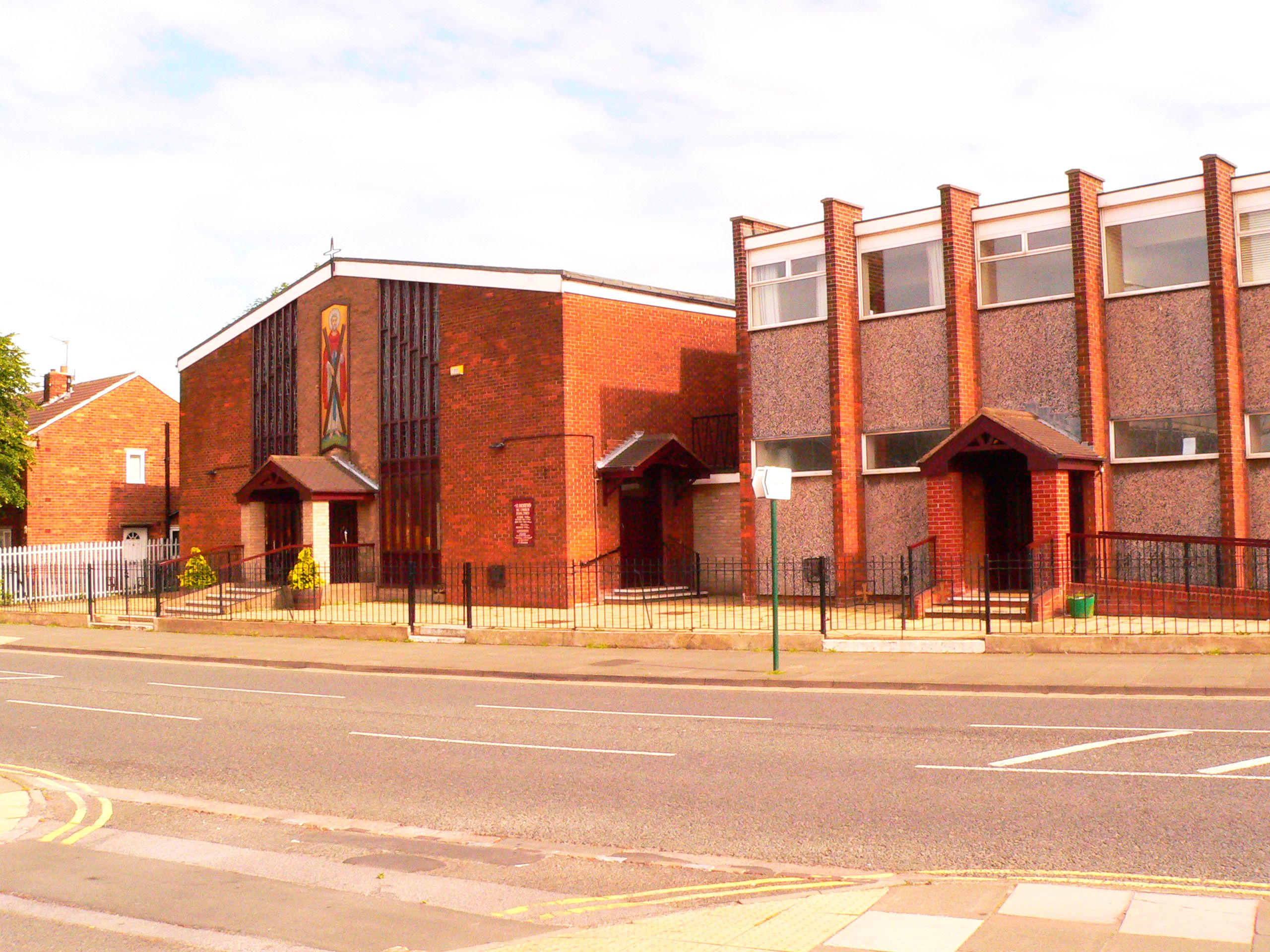
St Andrew's Church on Fabian Road, Teesville, is a Catholic church.

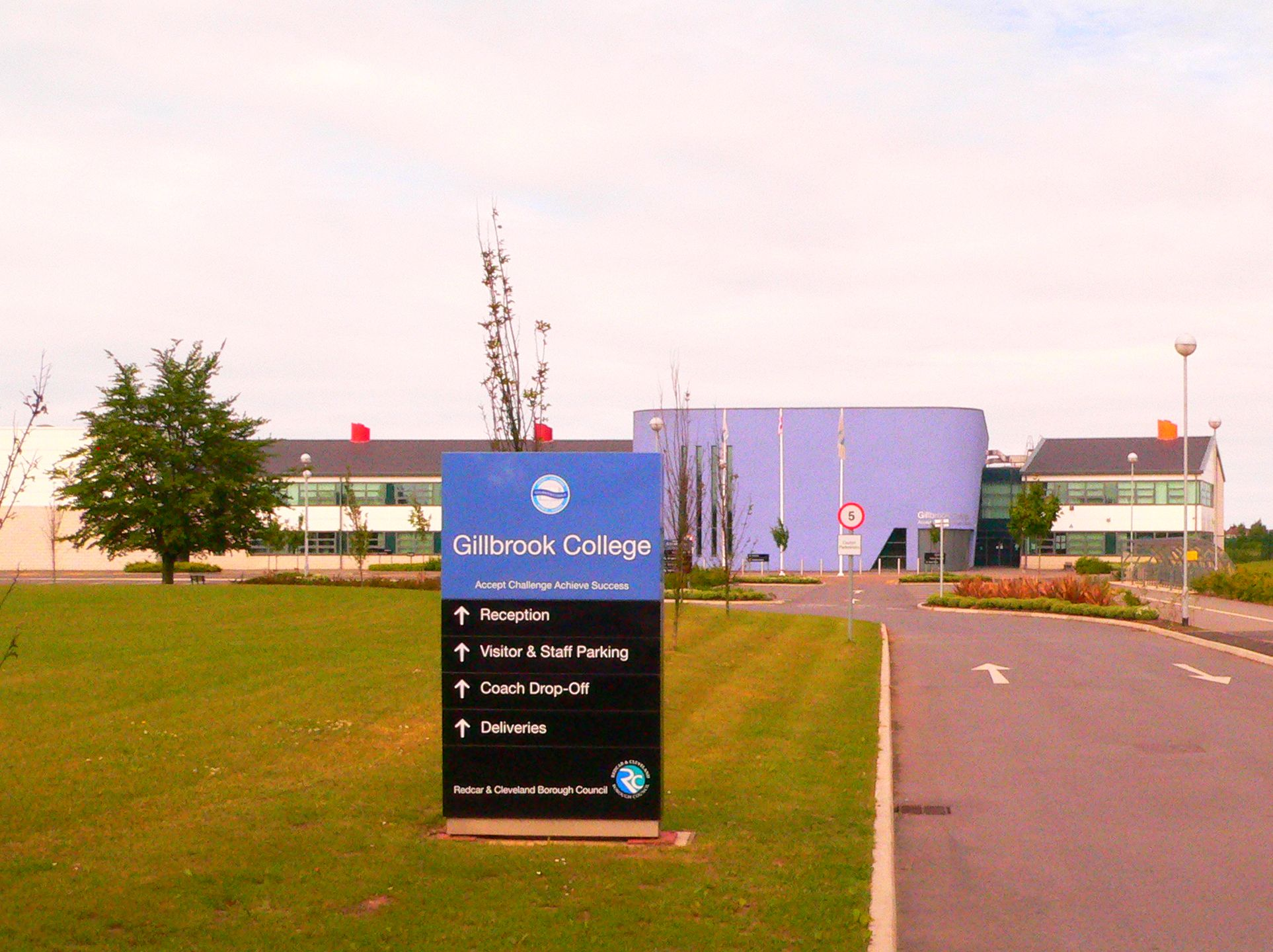
Outwood Academy Normanby.

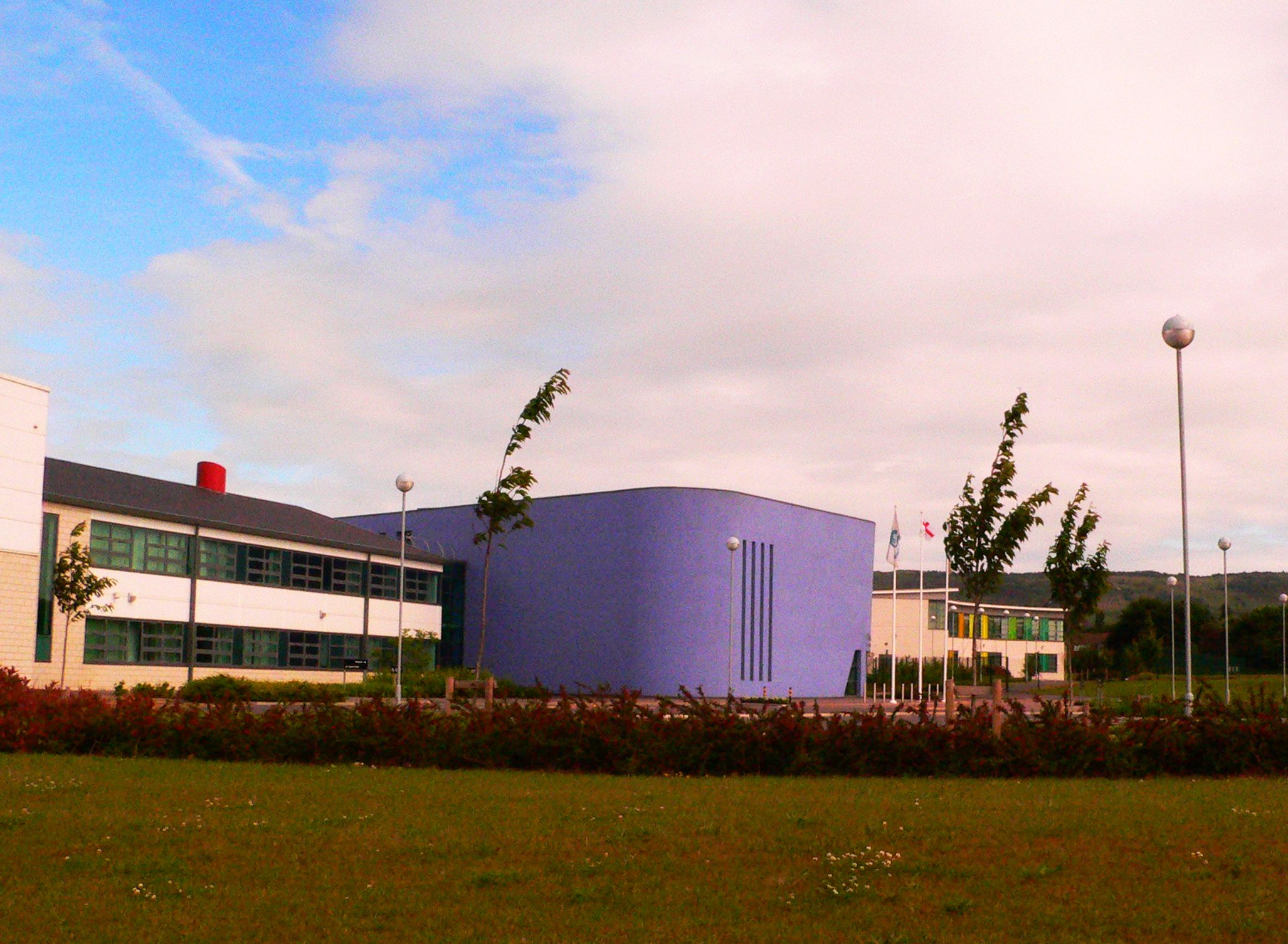
Former Gilbrook College, in 2010, now Outwood Academy Normanby.
