= Grangetown, North Yorkshire =

Area of Redcar and Cleveland in North Yorkshire, England

Coordinates: 54.580°N 1.144°W

Grangetown
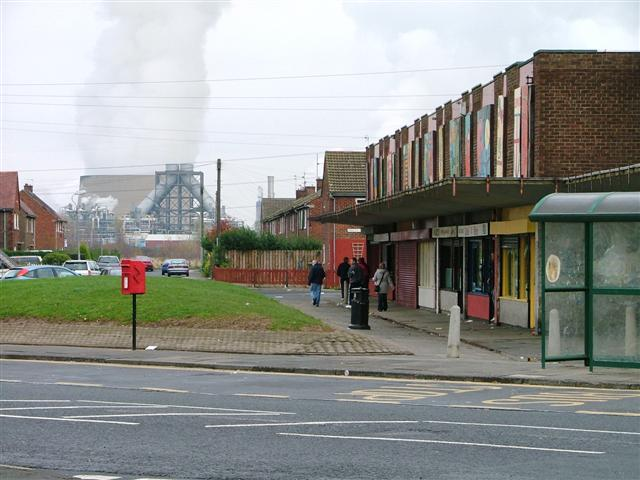
- Slater Road shops, south Grangetown

- Location within North Yorkshire
- Population: 5,088 (2011 census. Ward)
- OS grid reference: NZ554209
- Unitary authority: Redcar and Cleveland
- Ceremonial county: North Yorkshire
- Region: North East
- Country: England
- Sovereign state: United Kingdom
- Post town: MIDDLESBROUGH
- Postcode district: TS6
- Dialling code: 01642
- Police: Cleveland
- Fire: Cleveland
- Ambulance: North East
- UK Parliament: Redcar

Grangetown is an area in the borough of Redcar and Cleveland, North Yorkshire, England. The area is 3 miles (4.8 km) east of Middlesbrough and 4 miles (6.4 km) south-west of Redcar.

It is part of Greater Eston, which includes the area and the other centres of Eston, Normanby, South Bank, Teesville and part of Ormesby.

== History ==
Grangetown's development was a result of the discovery of ironstone in the nearby Eston Hills, in 1840. Workers came from other parts of England, as well as Ireland, and Eastern Europe to work in the iron and steel industry along the riverbanks by Messrs. Bolckow and Vaughan from 1881. The name of the village was taken from a farm nearby called Eston Grange, formerly a working farm for the monks of Guisborough Priory.

By 1914, it was a community of around 5,500 people with most houses lying between Bolckow Road and the steel works. There was a market square, shopping centre, boarding school, three pubs, six places of worship, a police station and public bathhouse.

Though the inhabitants came from many parts of the country, the community had built up a strong identity and local pride. The majority of men worked in the steel works, but a wide range of skills was represented within the area and a whole cross-section of society lived together in the area. In 1906, a power station was built near the railway station, which was the first in the world to generate at 11,000 volts. It closed in 1937 and was demolished in 1969.

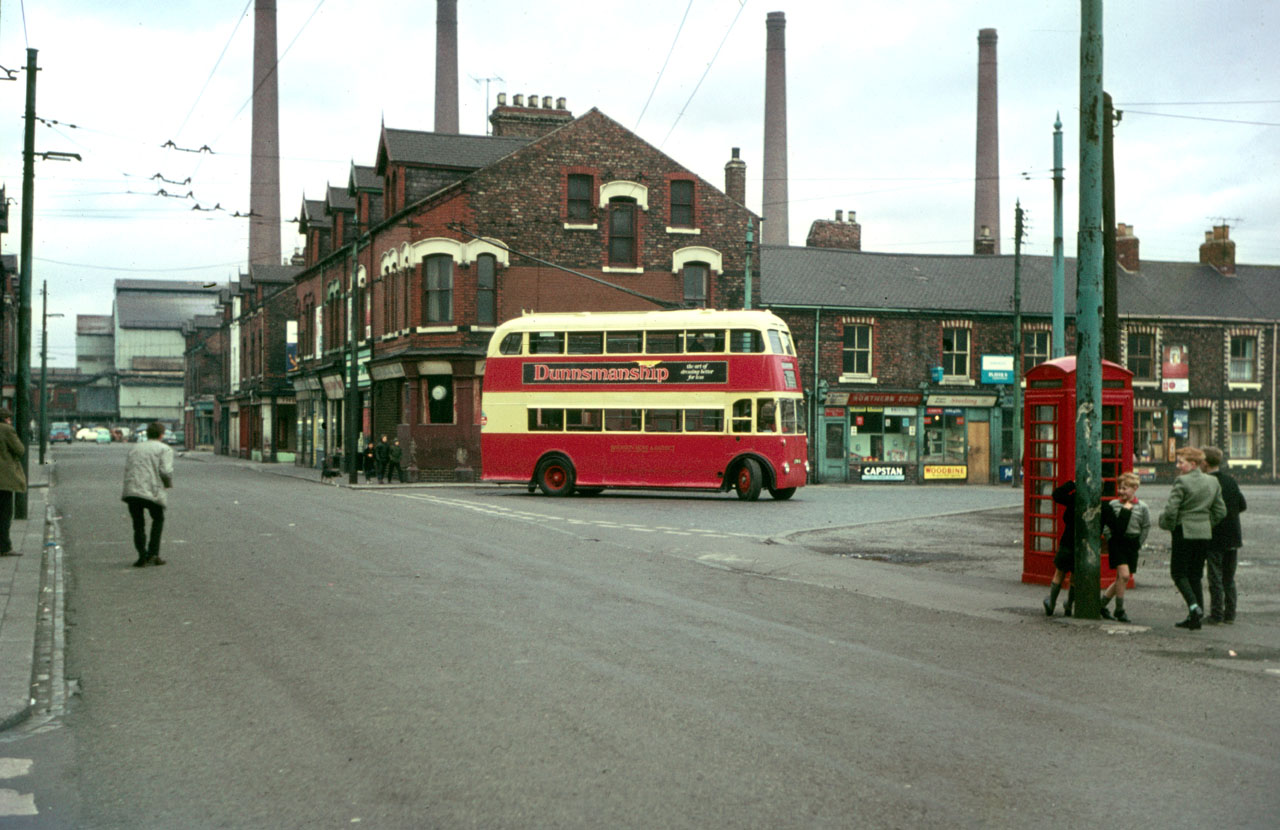
A trolleybus at the former centre Grangetown market square on 31 March 1968

Grangetown had a period of expansion between 1914 and 1939. Both the steel companies and the Eston Urban District council built estates from Bolckow Road to and across the new A1085 Trunk Road, with the steel company Bolckow Vaughan expanding their housing under the name of Grangetown Garden Village. After the war, council house building was extended and in the 1950s reached Fabian Road.

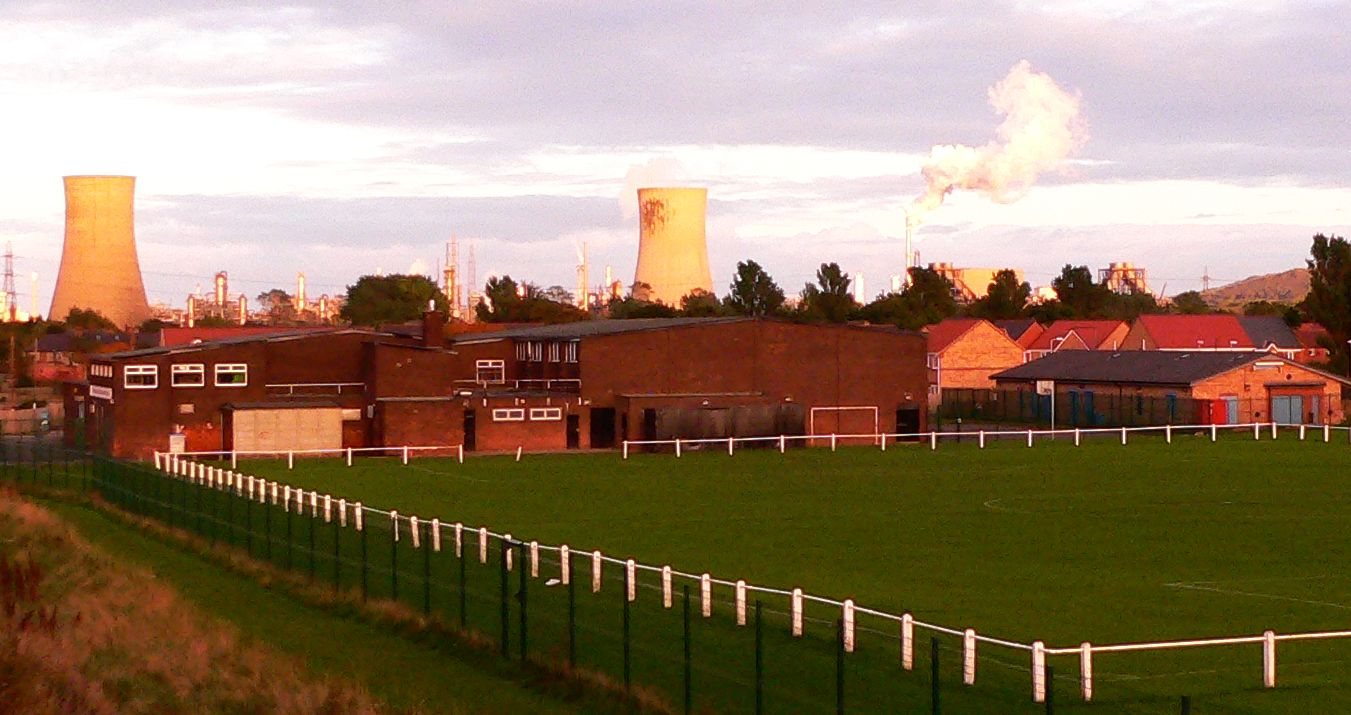
Grangetown Youth & Community Centre, Home to Grangetown Boys Club F.C.

The modern centre is on Birchington Avenue, the move in part due to the A66, which built through the area in the 1980s, and ends at a roundabout in the east of Grangetown. Victorian terraced-houses, near heavy industry along the River Tees have been replaced with warehouses and depots of lighter industry. Some new houses have been built over the years with most of its original Victorian architecture lost.

Grangetown Boys Club F.C., The town's local football team who compete in the Northern League Division Two

== Governance ==
It was historically part of the ancient Langbaurgh Wapentake in the Cleveland area of Yorkshire. The ancient parish of Ormesby was split into civil parishes, the area became part of the Eston parish. The civil parish developed into the Eston Urban District. The district was merged into County Borough of Teesside from 1968 until 1974. The area was then placed into the Borough of Langbaurgh, under the newly created County of Cleveland. When the county was abolished, Lanbaurgh-on-Tees, as it had been renamed, remained as the present unitary authority of Redcar and Cleveland.

== Politics ==
Grangetown is part of Redcar constituency, and is represented by Anna Turley, of the Labour and Co-operative parties.

=== 2023 local elections results ===
==== Borough Council ====
In the 2023 local elections, the following members were returned to Redcar and Cleveland Borough Council:

Ward	Councillor	Party
Grangetown	Adam Lee Brook	Labour Party
Grangetown	Lynn Pallister	Labour Party

== Demographics ==
In 1914, the community was around 5,500 people. The population in 1939 had grown to an approximate 9,000. By the 2011 census a ward covering the area had a population of 5,088.

== Notable people ==
- Eddie Latheron (1887–1917), Blackburn Rovers and England footballer
- William Henry Short V.C. (1884–1916), footballer and Battle of the Somme VC recipient
- Horace King, Baron Maybray-King (1901–1986), former Labour Party MP and Speaker of the House of Commons
- Wally K. Daly (1940–2020), television and radio writer
- Alan Keen (1937–2011), former Labour Party MP
- Roy Chubby Brown (born Roy Vasey, 1945) stand up comedian

== See also ==
- Eston
- Normanby
- Teesville
