= William Henry Short =

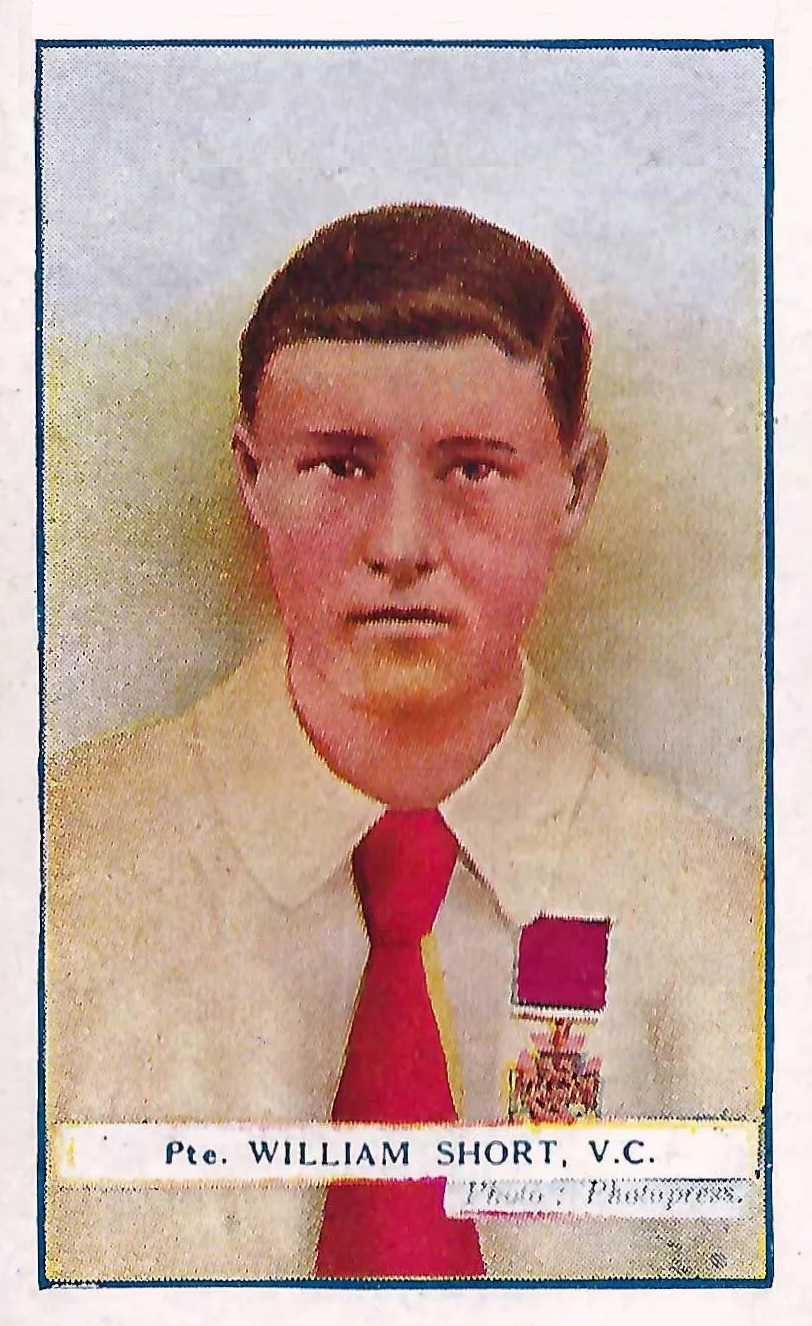
- Pte Short depicted on a cigarette card
- Born: 4 February 1885; Eston, North Riding of Yorkshire, England
- Died: 7 August 1916 (aged 31); Contalmaison, France
- Burial place: Contalmaison Chateau Cemetery
- Military career
- Allegiance: United Kingdom
- Branch: British Army
- Service years: 1914–1916 †
- Rank: Private
- Units: Green Howards
- Conflicts: World War I: Battle of the Somme †
- Awards: Victoria Cross

William Henry Short VC (4 February 1884 – 6 August 1916) was an English recipient of the Victoria Cross, the highest and most prestigious award for gallantry in the face of the enemy that can be awarded to British and Commonwealth forces.

Short was from Eston, Middlesbrough. Before the war he was a steelworker, working as a craneman in a steelworks at Eston. He was also a popular local footballer, playing for the Grangetown Albion, Saltburn, and Lazenby United.

Short joined the army in September 1914, shortly after the outbreak of the First World War, and went to France in August 1915. He was a 31 year old private in the 8th Battalion, Yorkshire Regiment (Green Howards), when on 6 August 1916 at Munster Alley, Contalmaison, France, during the Battle of the Somme, the following deed took place for which he was awarded the VC:

For most conspicuous bravery. He was foremost in the attack, bombing the enemy with great gallantry, when he was severely wounded in the foot. He was urged to go back, but refused and continued to throw bombs. Later his leg was shattered by a shell, and he was unable to stand, so he lay in the trench adjusting detonators and straightening the pins of bombs for his comrades. He died before he could be carried out of the trench. For the last eleven months he had always volunteered for dangerous enterprises, and has always set a magnificent example of bravery and devotion to duty.

Short was interred at Contalmaison Chateau Cemetery, France. The gravestone inscription reads: SAFE WITH JESUS NEVER FORGOTTEN BY MOTHER FATHER, BROTHERS & SISTERS TILL WE MEET AGAIN.

His Victoria Cross is displayed at the Green Howards Museum, Richmond, North Yorkshire, England. His steel helmet is part of the collection of the Imperial War Museum.

Gravestone and memorial

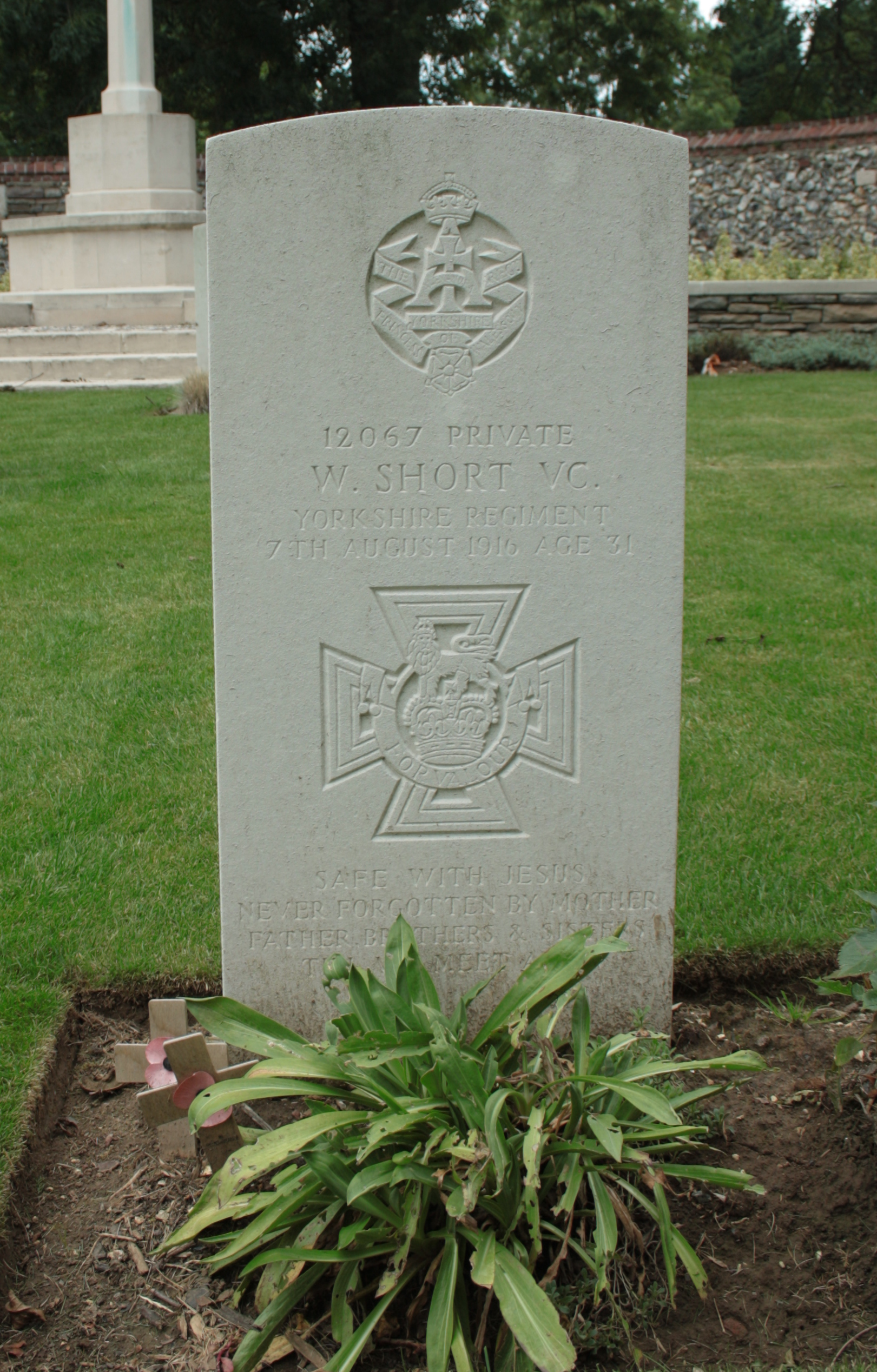
Short's gravestone

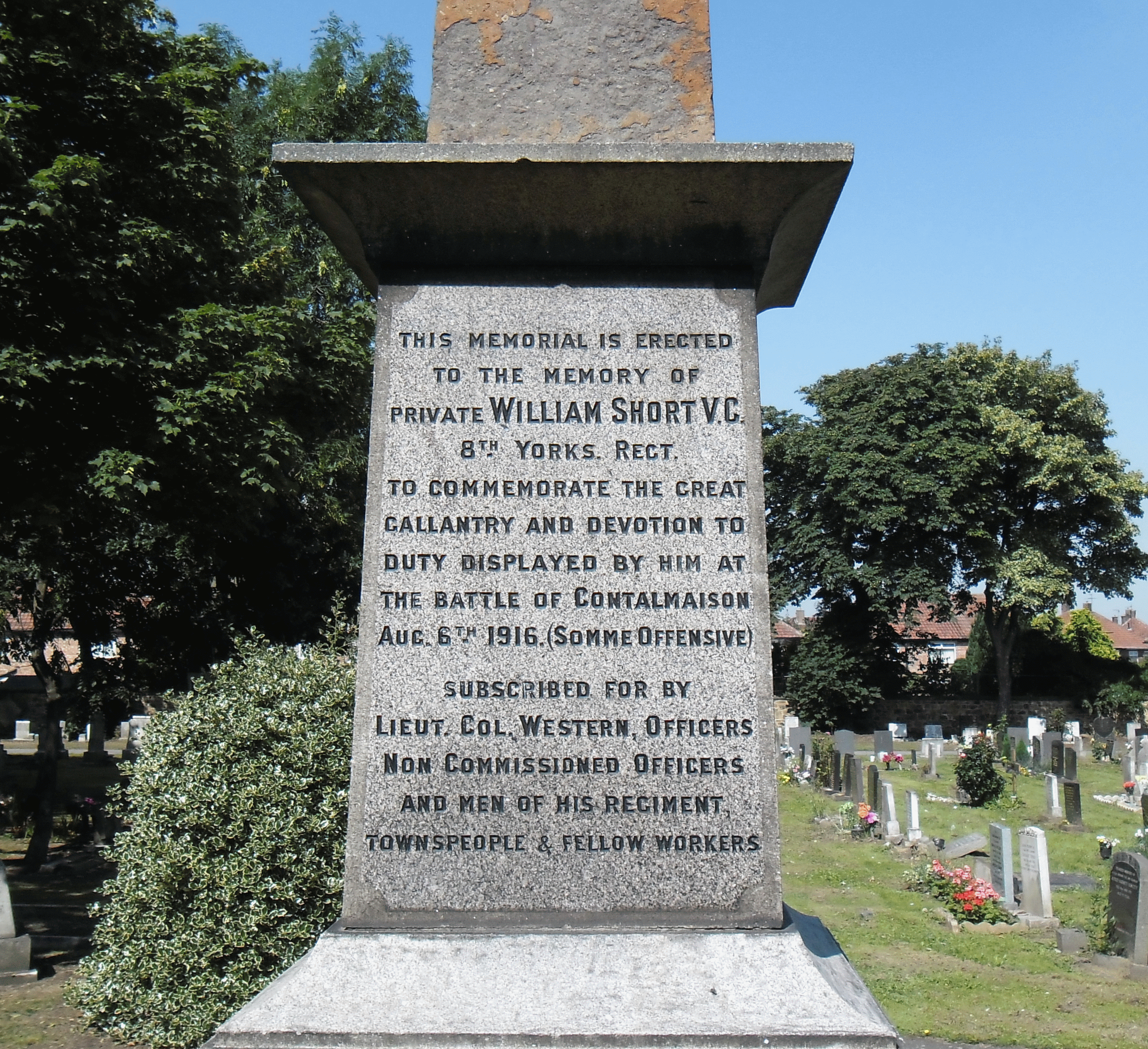
Short's monument, Eston Cemetery

== Bibliography ==
- Monuments to Courage (David Harvey, 1999)
- The Register of the Victoria Cross (This England, 1997)
- VCs of the First World War - The Somme (Gerald Gliddon, 1994)
