= Intensive Care Society =

British medical organisation

Coordinates: 51.5194°N 0.1196°W

The Intensive Care Society is the representative body in the United Kingdom for intensive care professionals and patients and the oldest society for critical care medicine in the world. The Society is dedicated to the delivery of the highest quality of critical care to patients in the United Kingdom. It performs many functions for the intensive care community in the United Kingdom such as the production of guidelines and standards, staging national meetings, training courses and focus groups. It represents Intensive Care in wide-ranging organisations from the Royal Colleges to the Department of Health and other organisations and societies with a stake or interest in intensive care.

It was previously an organisation responsible for promoting and maintaining intensive care and critical care medicine in the United Kingdom. It was represented on the Intercollegiate Board for Training in Intensive Care until responsibility for design and accreditation of training in Intensive Care Medicine passed to the Faculty of Intensive Care Medicine in 2011.

The society is based at Breams Buildings in London, previously at the Royal College of Anaesthetists, The College of Emergency Medicine & the British Association for Emergency Medicine and the British Pain Society. The Society's patron is The Princess Royal.
