= Eston =

Town in North Yorkshire, England

Coordinates: 54.560°N 1.144°W

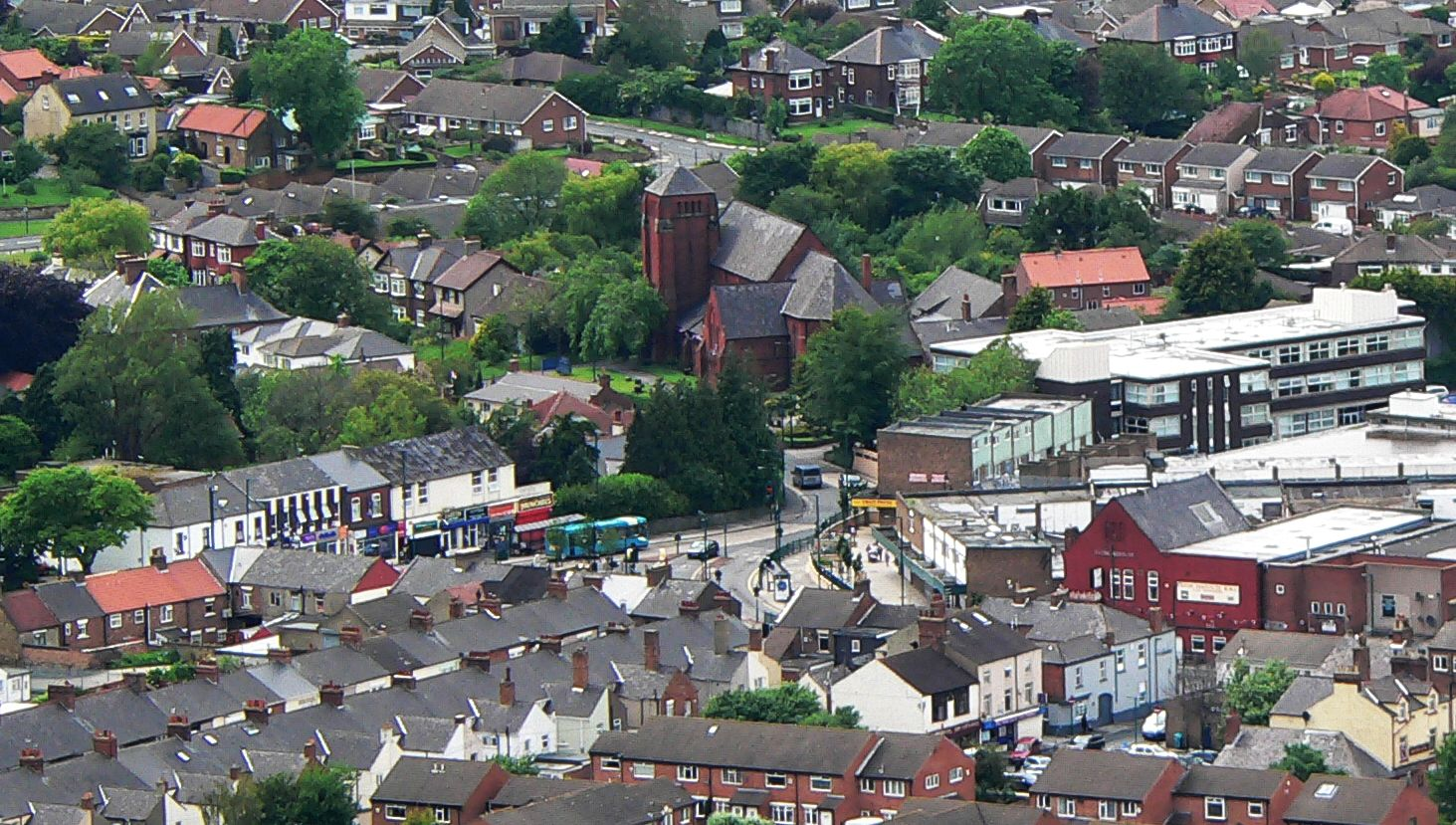
- A view of Eston Square from Eston Hills

- Location within North Yorkshire
- Population: 7,005 (2011 census. ward)
- OS grid reference: NZ554187
- Unitary authority: Redcar and Cleveland
- Ceremonial county: North Yorkshire
- Region: North East
- Country: England
- Sovereign state: United Kingdom
- Post town: MIDDLESBROUGH
- Postcode district: TS6
- Dialling code: 01642
- Police: Cleveland
- Fire: Cleveland
- Ambulance: North East
- UK Parliament: Redcar

Eston is a former industrial town in the Redcar and Cleveland unitary area of North Yorkshire, England. It is part of Greater Eston, which includes the outlying settlements of Grangetown, Normanby, South Bank, Teesville and part of Ormesby.

== Demographics ==
The local authority ward covering the area (as well as Lackenby, Lazenby and Wilton) had a population of 7,005 at the 2011 census.

== History ==
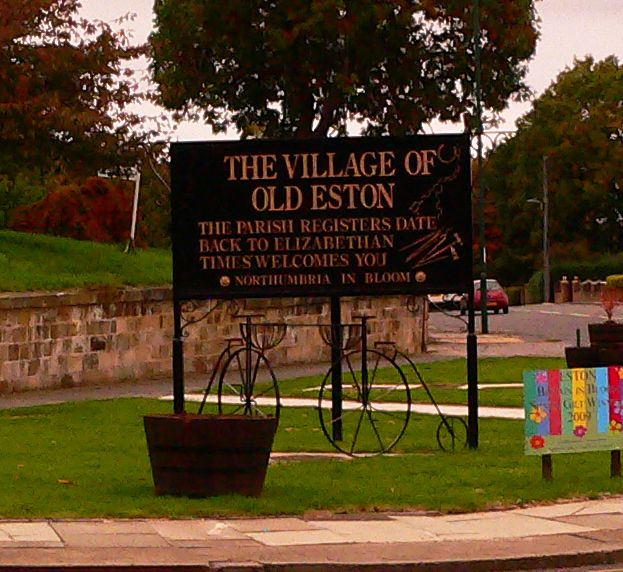
A sign showing the location of Eston in the past

The name Eston derives from the Old English ēasttūn meaning 'east settlement'.

The land around Eston has been occupied since 2400 BC. The 1850 discovery of ironstone in Eston Hills by industrialist John Vaughan and mining engineer John Marley saw Eston develop from a small farming settlement in 1850 to a thriving mining town. Miners' cottages, although altered, can still be seen in parts of Eston. The mining history of Eston was the subject of A Century in Stone, which describes how the mines were responsible for making Teesside the iron and steel capital of the world.

Excluding Ormesby, the wider area came under the former Eston Urban District from 1894 until 1968. This was a single civil parish with a district council which had the ability to gain a charter to be a town and become a municipal borough, but in this case it did not. The County Borough of Teesside was created in 1968. The town remains unparished.

The Teesside steel industry that was started from these mines eventually produced the steel that built the Sydney Harbour Bridge. The mines have been closed since 1949, after 100 years of production. In 1967, the Teesside steel industry became part of the nationalised British Steel Corporation, which in turn became the Corus Group. The Middlesbrough area became the world's leading iron and steel producing capital initially due to the output of the Eston mines.

== Politics ==
Eston is part of Redcar constituency and is represented by Labour and Co-operative parties MP Anna Turley in the House of Commons following the 2024 general election.

=== 2023 local elections results ===
==== Unitary Authority ====
In the 2023 local elections, the following members were returned to Redcar and Cleveland Borough Council:

| Ward | Councillor | Party |
|---|---|---|
| Eston | Christopher Massey | Labour Party |
| Eston | Stephen Martin | Conservative Party |
| Eston | David Taylor | Conservative Party |

== Eston Square ==
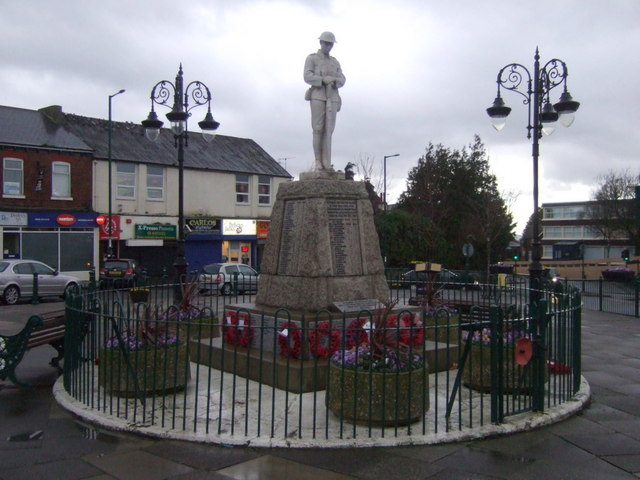
Eston War Memorial

Eston Square, the shopping area on the main road passing through Eston, forms more of a triangle than a square. The square has a war memorial as its centrepiece – the Tomb of the Unknown Soldier – that shows the statue of a soldier atop a plinth. The plinth lists the names of local people who died during the World Wars.

Two sides the square are lined with traditional terraced shops, while the third side has the 1960s-built Eston Precinct parade of shops. Eston Square provides an important retail facility for a much wider area than just Eston itself. While some of the shops are well maintained businesses, others, in the words of Redcar and Cleveland Council, "are in need of a facelift". As part of Redcar and Cleveland Council's Greater Eston Regeneration, improvements are planned, including the part-demolition of the Precinct Shopping Centre and the building of a new supermarket.

== Churches ==
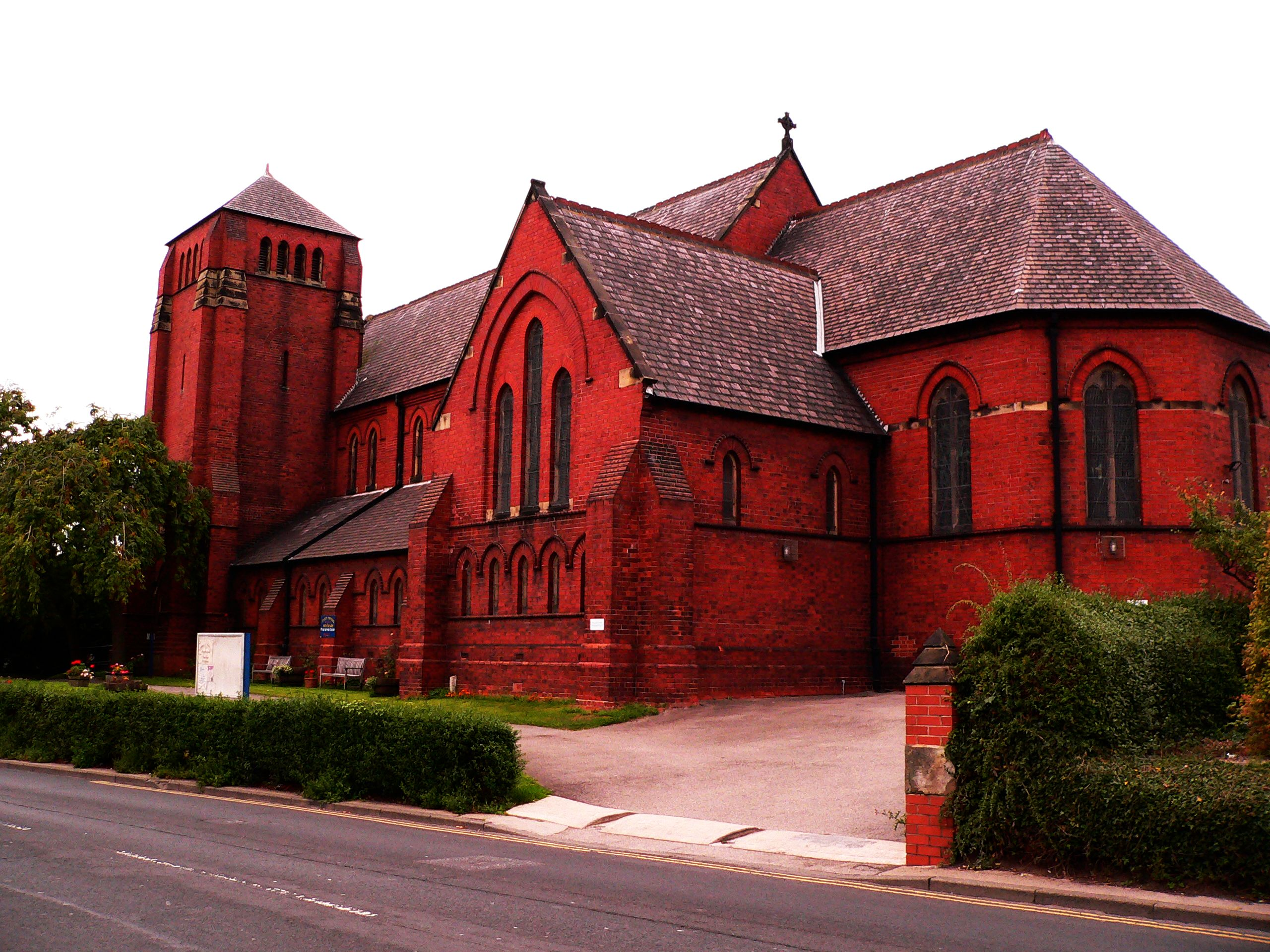
Christ Church, Eston

Eston has three major churches, two on the High Street and one in Whale Hill.

Christ Church, the Church of England church in Eston, is the partner church to St George's Church in Teesville. Christ Church is a traditionally designed church built in red brick. It features sixteen stained-glass windows in dressed sandstone settings that bring warm colourful light into the main body of the building; they are themed around saints.

Similarly, St Anne's Church, the Catholic church in Eston, is part of a larger parish, which includes the churches of St Peter's, South Bank, St Andrew's, Teesville and St Mary's, Grangetown. The joint parish is served from, and carries the name of, St Andrew's Parish. St Anne's Church was built in 1970, although the Catholic community had existed as a distinct group for many years before that. Before the church was built a mass took place each Sunday at the Grangetown Royal British Legion Social Club.

== Eston Hills ==
The town of Eston lies at the foot of Eston Hills, an escarpment approximately 200 metres (656 ft) above sea level, and a part of the Cleveland Hills. The same hills that overshadow Eston were used to warn of attack in the Napoleonic Era by a beacon, the remains of which can still be seen at Eston Nab. Eston Nab is also home to the communication masts of Bauer Teesside.

At only 243 metres (797 ft) above sea level at its highest point, Eston Hills are classed as lowland heath.

Wildlife includes lapwing, curlew, green woodpecker and linnet. There are various butterflies and dragonflies.

The hills overlooking Eston are managed for their wildlife, archaeology and amenity. Many people use the hills for walking, cycling and horse riding. There are several self-guided walk leaflets, which take in points of interest. These are available at the Flatts Lane Woodland Country Park Visitor Centre, Normanby, Redcar and Cleveland.

The Eston Hills provide access to the wider countryside via the public right of way network. The land owned or managed by the Redcar and Cleveland Borough Council is mostly bordered by farmland. Eston Nab commands an excellent view of the nearby Roseberry Topping, which stands higher at 320 metres (1,050 ft).

== Cemetery ==
Still in active use, the Eston Cemetery was established in 1863 and enlarged in 1882. It built as an extension to the pre-reformation St Helen Church which was one of the many churches belonging to Gisborough Priory. St Helen's has since been dismantled and rebuilt at Beamish Museum. The cemetery is located off Church Lane, north of Eston's old centre.

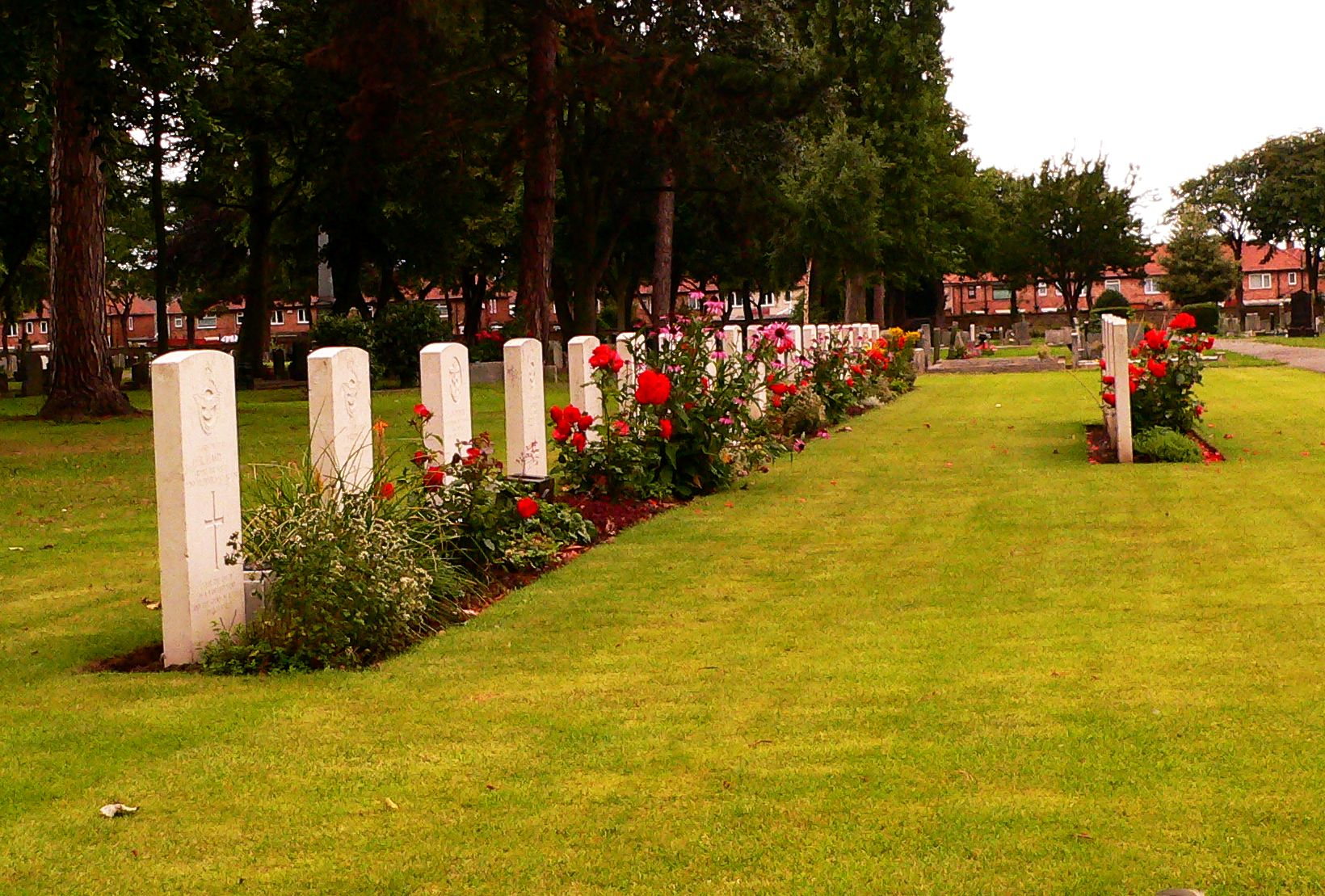
CWGC War Graves at Eston Cemetery

Names on the gravestones tell the story off the families whose daily lives created the history of the wider area, throughout the twentieth century until the present. The Commonwealth War Graves Commission is responsible for commemorating all Commonwealth war dead individually and equally, and to this end, war graves with uniform headstones, set in well kept lawns, can be found in cemeteries throughout the British Commonwealth. The Commission lists ninety-eight such graves, at Eston Cemetery, from the First and Second World Wars. The cemetery contains the war graves of 55 Commonwealth service personnel of the First World War and 43 of the Second World War, including one unidentified Royal Navy sailor.

Having more than 40 war graves, a Cross of Sacrifice designed by architect Reginald Blomfield has been erected. It shows a simple cross embedded with a bronze sword and mounted on an octagonal base to represent the faith of the majority of commemorations. It can be seen in front of the West Lodge.

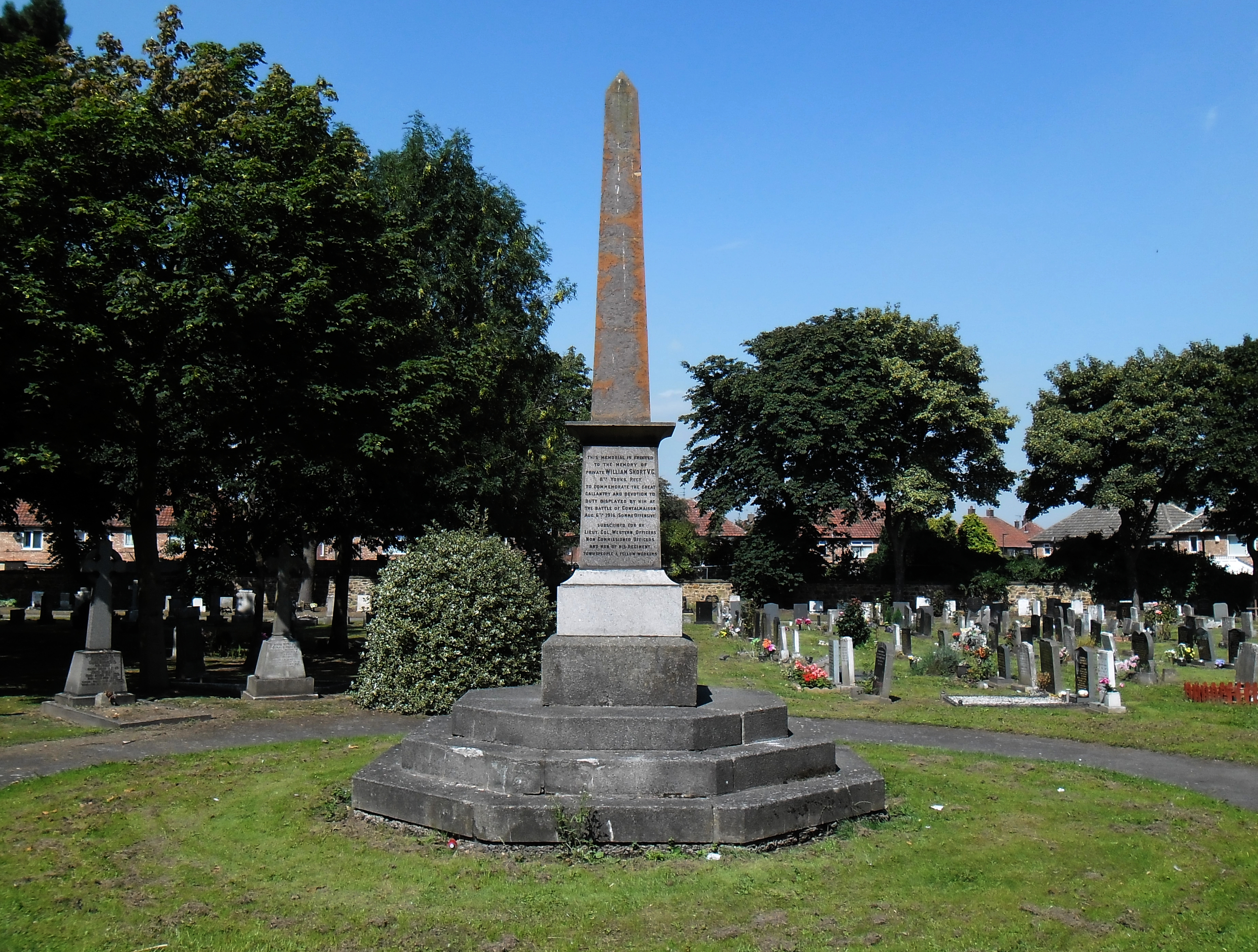
Monument to William Henry Short VC at Eston Cemetery

The cemetery also contains the memorial obelisk to William Henry Short VC (4 February 1884 – 6 August 1916) who was an English recipient of the Victoria Cross, the highest and most prestigious award for gallantry in the face of the enemy that can be awarded to British and Commonwealth forces. He was awarded the medal after being killed showing gallantry and devotion to duty at the Battle of Contalmaison, during the Somme Offensive, in 1916.

== Whale Hill ==
Eston also includes the area of Whale Hill, which was initially built between 1966 and 1970, it has mixed tenure housing. It includes a social club and a row of shops, including a chemist, post office, supermarket, fish shop, Chinese takeaway and a corner shop. The area also benefits from a large local community centre.

== Notable people ==
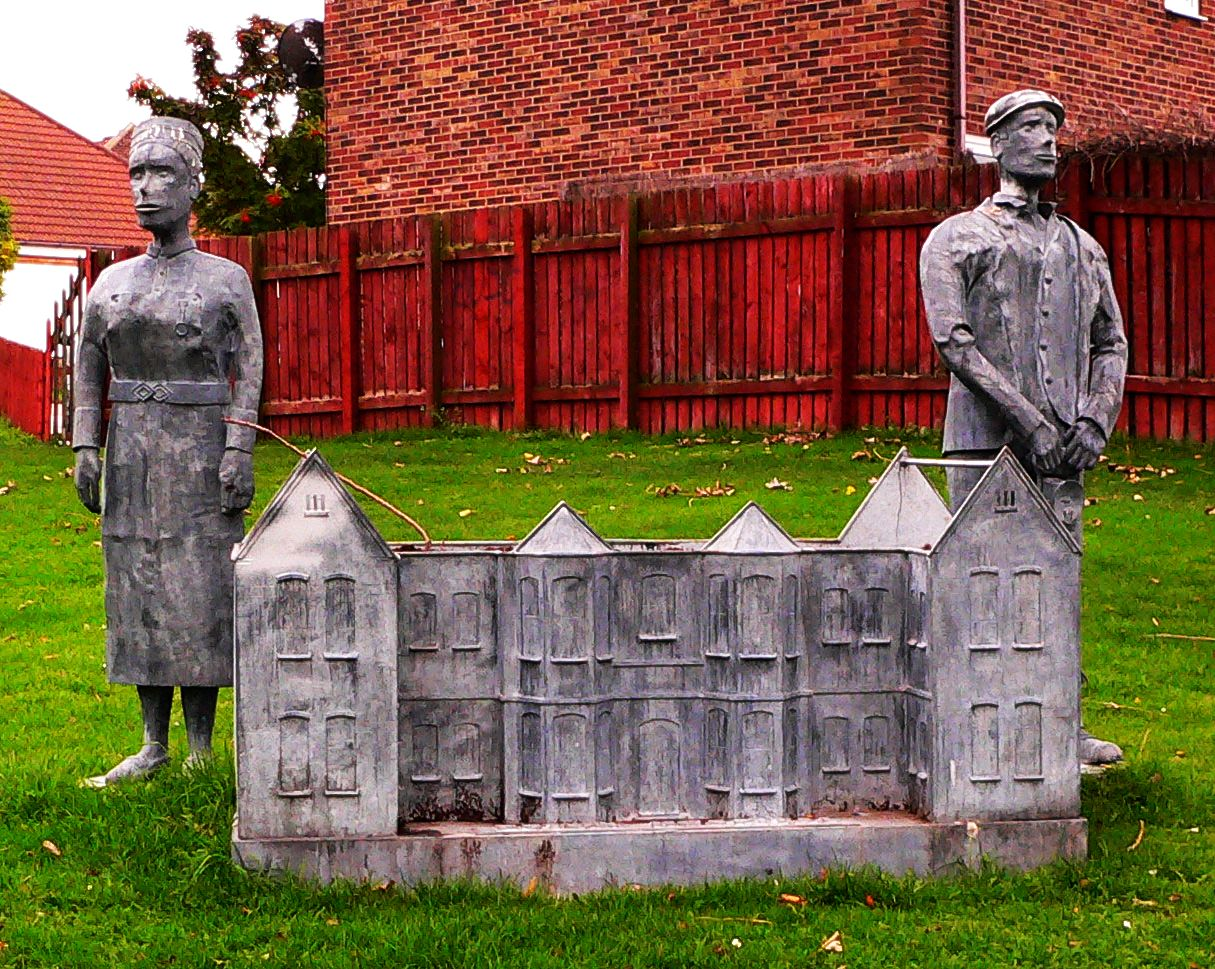
Eston Hospital: commemorative flowerbed sculpture

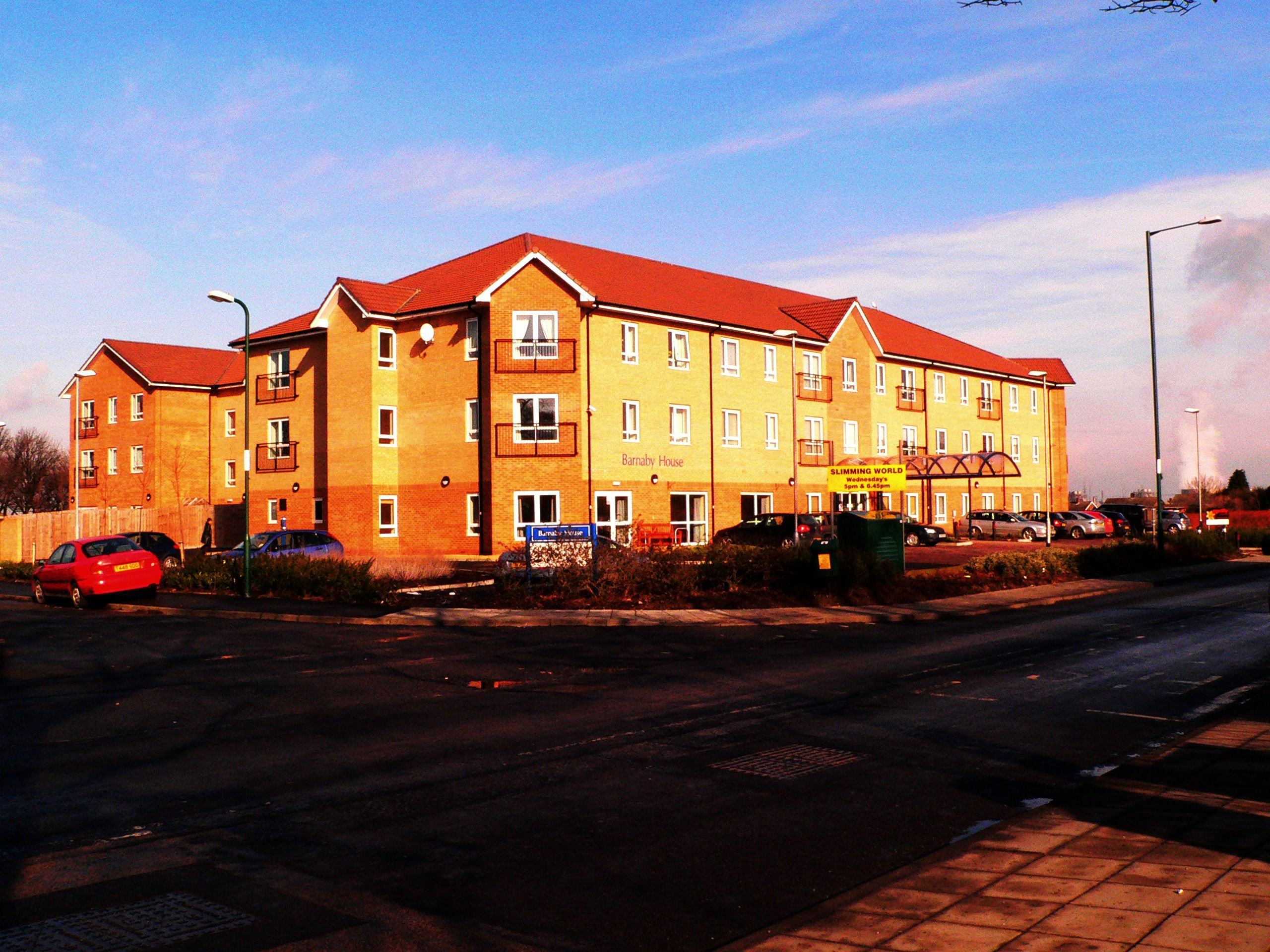
Barnaby House is an 'extra care' housing scheme

- William Henry Short (1884–1916) – Victoria Cross recipient, born and lived at 11, William Street, Eston, until the family moved to Grangetown in 1900. He played football for Grangetown Albion and Saltburn and Lazenby United Football Clubs. He fought in the early stages of the Battle of the Somme where he was killed showing gallantry and devotion to duty. His name is recorded on the Grangetown war memorial and the obelisk in Eston Cemetery.
- Richard Douglas Sandford (1891–1918) – died as patient at Eston Hospital 12 days after the Armistice and buried at Eston Cemetery. He received the Victoria Cross for his gallantry in the Zeebrugge Raid in April 1918.
- Joseph Stoddart (1932–2019) – Consultant Anaesthetist who served in the Royal Air Force and developed the use of Intensive Care in the UK, based at the Royal Victoria Infirmary. Born in Eston.
- Walter Gibson "Billy" Bottrill (1903 - 1986) - Played professional football for a number of clubs including Middlesbrough where he made 18 appearances.

== See also ==
- Bolckow, Vaughan
- Eston Nab
- Eston railway station
