= Faculty of Intensive Care Medicine =

The Faculty of Intensive Care Medicine is the organisation involved with the training, assessment, practice and continuing professional development of Intensive care medicine consultants in the United Kingdom. The current dean is Dr Jack Parry-Jones. The Faculty is based at Churchill House, London. Fellows are entitled to use the post-nominal letters FFICM (with continued payment of college/faculy fees).

The Faculty has seven parent Colleges, reflecting the multiprofessional nature of ICM.

- Royal College of Anaesthetists, which acts as lead governance College of the Faculty.
- Royal College of Emergency Medicine
- Royal College of Physicians of Edinburgh
- Royal College of Physicians of London
- Royal College of Physicians and Surgeons of Glasgow
- Royal College of Surgeons of Edinburgh
- Royal College of Surgeons of England

On 22 November 2010, Professor Julian Bion was admitted as the first Dean of the new faculty.

As of January 2015 the faculty has 1901 Fellows and Members and 129 trainees.
