= Cleveland Work Camps =

English unemployed miners' aid scheme, 1932–38

The Cleveland Work Camps in England were known locally as "Heartbreak Hill". They were a series of short events, staged in the East Cleveland ironstone mining villages of Boosbeck and Margrove Park, which ran from 1932 to 1938 with the aim of helping to alleviate the poverty which these mining communities experienced as a result of pit closures during the Great Depression. Notable figures involved with establishing the scheme were the aristocratic landowner Major James Pennyman and his wife Ruth Pennyman, an idealistic young Cambridge University graduate called Rolf Gardiner, Manchester Guardian Journalist David Ayerst and local trade unions.

The scheme was ostensibly created to enable the miners, with the help of student volunteers, to cultivate rough moorland with the aim of growing crops and keeping livestock. In addition to these practicalities, music and entertainment events were also staged with the aim of helping the student volunteers integrate with the miners. At the first camp, staged in April 1932, the evening events were run by the German choral teacher Georg Götsch, who taught the miners to sing German baroque music. The renown German puppeteer Harro Seigel staged puppet shows which accompanied Götsch's music. At the second camp, staged in September 1932, Georg Götsch was replaced as musical director by the composer Michael Tippett. Tippett staged a version of The Beggars Opera, with local miners performing alongside Tippett's friends, Francesca Allinson and Wilfred Franks. It was through the work camps that Tippett met Franks and he later described the relationship as 'The deepest most shattering experience of falling in love'. Immediately after the 1932 camp Tippett began composing his String Quartet No.1 which was dedicated to Franks. 'All that love flowed out in the slow movement of my first string quartet' the composer added.

For a later camp of 1934, Tippett wrote Robin Hood (Tippett opera), which was also performed by members of the local mining community (including Marjorie Bradley) as well as Franks, who acted the part of Friar Tuck. One notable member of Tippett's small orchestra was Frida Knight, who played violin.

A furniture making project was established to train a group of young miners new employment skills. This furniture making scheme was initiated by Wilfred Franks who had studied furniture making in Germany under the Bauhaus master Reinhold Weidensee. The scheme was later developed into a furniture manufacturing business by Bernard Aylward, of Bootham School in York.
