= Robin Hood (Tippett opera) =

Ballad opera by Michael Tippett

- Ballad opera by Michael Tippett
- Librettist: Tippett
- Language: English
- Based on: Robin Hood
- Premiere: 1934; Work camps, North Yorkshire

Robin Hood is a ballad opera by Michael Tippett based on the legend of Robin Hood. Composed in 1934, the score remains unpublished. However, Tippett later used an expanded version of the overture as the finale to his 1948 Suite in D major (For the Birthday of Prince Charles).

== Background ==
During the Great Depression of the 1930s, Tippett was hired to organize the musical life at the Cleveland Work Camps for unemployed miners in North Yorkshire. As part of his work there, he revised and abridged John Gay's The Beggar's Opera for performances in the church hall next to the Miners' Institute in Boosbeck. Encouraged by its success, he composed a ballad opera of his own, Robin Hood, with a subtext that reflected the difficulties faced by the unemployed miners. At this time in his life Tippett was involved with radical left-wing politics and the libretto reflected these socialist views. Performers in the opera included friends of the composer such as Wilfred Franks, and local miners such as Tom Batterbee. It was first performed in 1934 by the local villagers, miners, and students at the work camps. Although a success both with the participants and the audience, the work bears little resemblance to the composer's mature style, and Tippett would later not allow it to be performed. Nevertheless, some of the songs from the opera were sung again in 2009 at the Station Hotel in Boosbeck and recorded for the BBC Radio 3 Programme Music Matters.
