= Normanby, Redcar and Cleveland =

Area of Redcar and Cleveland, North Yorkshire, England

Coordinates: 54.557°N 1.157°W

Normanby
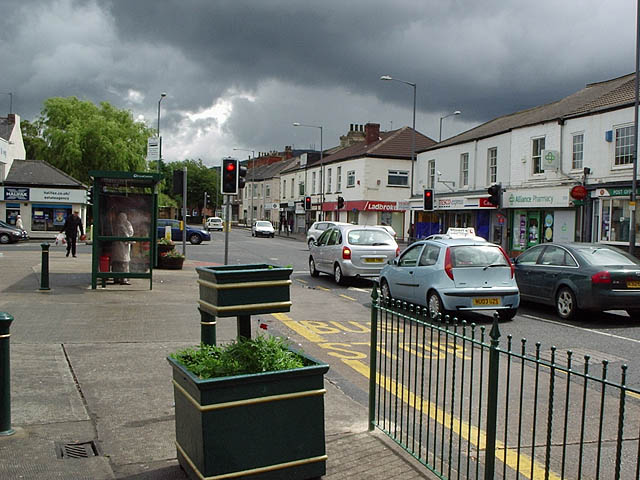
- Normanby High Street

- Location within North Yorkshire
- Population: 6,930 (2011 census. ward)
- OS grid reference: NZ555185
- Unitary authority: Redcar and Cleveland
- Ceremonial county: North Yorkshire
- Region: North East
- Country: England
- Sovereign state: United Kingdom
- Post town: MIDDLESBROUGH
- Postcode district: TS6
- Dialling code: 01642
- Police: Cleveland
- Fire: Cleveland
- Ambulance: North East
- UK Parliament: Redcar

Normanby is an area in the borough of Redcar and Cleveland, North Yorkshire, England. It is part of Greater Eston, which includes the area and the outlying settlements of Eston, Grangetown, South Bank, Teesville and part of Ormesby.

== Demographics ==
John Marius Wilson's Imperial Gazetteer of England and Wales recorded the population as 195 in 1851. In 1911 the parish had a population of 14,977. A ward covering the area had a population of 6,930 at the 2011 census.

== History ==
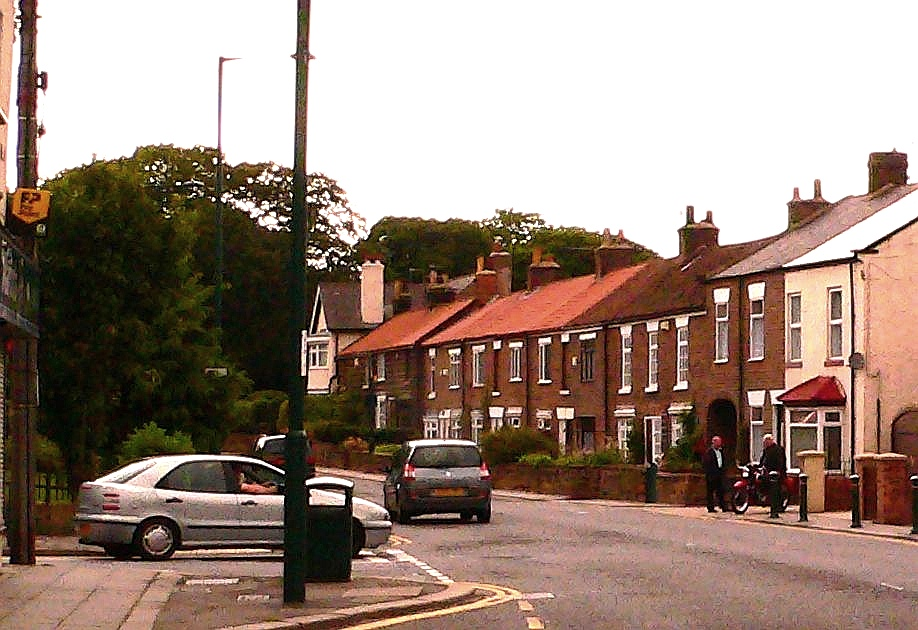
Housing west of Normanby High Street shops

The name Normanby derives from the Old English Norðman meaning 'Norwegian' and the Old Norse bȳ meaning 'village'.

In 1870–72, John Marius Wilson's Imperial Gazetteer of England and Wales described Normanby like this:

NORMANBY, a village and a township in Ormsby parish, N. R. Yorkshire. The village stands 2 miles (3.2 km) N E of Ormsby r. station, and 4 W N W of Guisborough; and has a post-office under Middlesbrough. The township extends to the coast; and comprises 1, 343 acres of land, and 355 of water. Real property, £7, 949; of which £4,060 are in iron-works. Pop. in 1851, 195; in 1861, 2, 204. Houses, 397. The increase of pop. arose mainly from the opening of extensive ironstone works, and from the establishing of glass furnaces. Norman by Hall is a chief residence. Bricks and tiles are made. There is a national school.

— John Marius Wilson, Imperial Gazetteer of England and Wales

Normanby was historically a township in the ancient parish of Ormesby. A local government district covering the township was created in 1865, governed by a local board. In 1866 Normanby became a separate civil parish. A town hall was built for the district at South Bank in 1878. Such districts were reconstituted as urban districts under the Local Government Act 1894. At the second meeting of the urban district council in January 1895 it voted to change the district's name from Normanby to "South Bank in Normanby", acknowledging that South Bank was the larger settlement within the district. The change of name was confirmed by North Riding County Council in May 1895.

South Bank in Normanby Urban District was abolished in 1915 and absorbed into the neighbouring Eston Urban District, which in turn was abolished in 1968 to become part of the County Borough of Teesside. From 1974 to 1996 it was in the county of Cleveland.

== Governance ==
Normanby is part of Redcar parliamentary constituency in the House of Commons.

=== Borough Council ===
In the 2023 local elections, the following members were returned to Redcar and Cleveland Borough Council:

Ward	Councillor	Party
Normanby	Paul McInnes	Conservative Party
Normanby	Curt Pugh	Conservative Party
Normanby	Paul Salvin	Conservative Party

== Flatts Lane Woodland Country Park ==
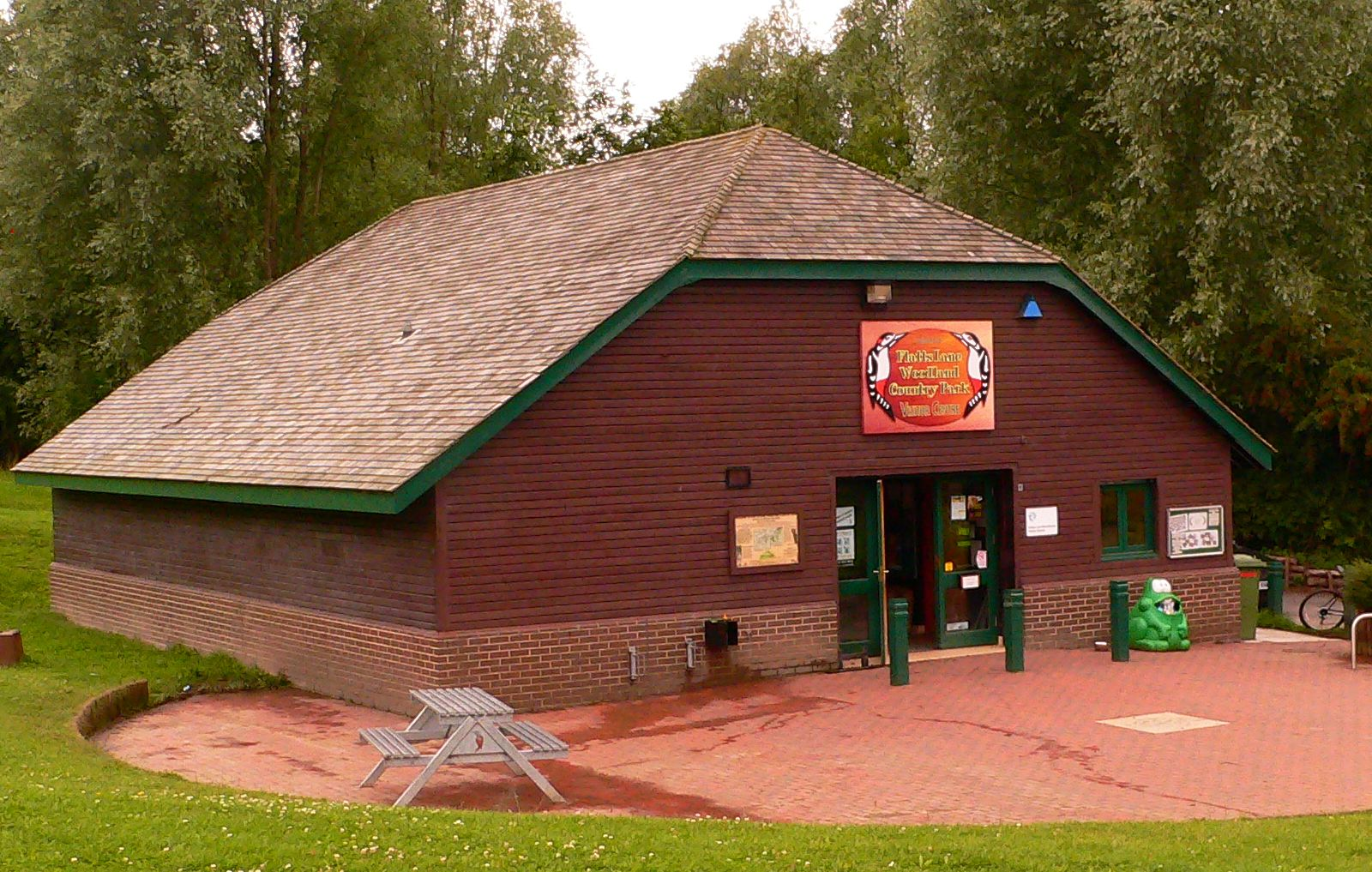
Flatts Lane Woodland Country Park Visitor Centre

Flatts Lane Woodland Country Park is an area of woodland in Normanby, sheltered from the urban sprawl below in the Tees Valley. It provides residents with a place to walk and exercise. It aims to give a 'countryside experience' without a long journey to reach it.

There is a visitors' centre – which stands on the site of the former Normanby Brickworks. Some of the walkways in the park follow the course of the now defunct Cleveland Railway, which served the brickworks. The visitors' centre has exhibits and information about wildlife and conservation, as well as serving as a base for the information-giving Ranger.

The park has a variety of habitats, including both deciduous and coniferous woodlands, grassland and ponds. There are several walks throughout the wooded areas of the park, an outdoor exercise area and a children's playground. There is a network of bridleways for mountain bikers and horseriders.

In the past, Flatts Lane veered from its present route and crossed the land now occupied by the Country Woodland Park. It was used by monks, farmers and traders to carry goods between markets and coastal ports. The cobbled path can still be seen in some places as it runs across the site. Godfalter Hill is a prominent landmark topped by its distinctive beech trees making it visible for miles around.

Flatts Lane Woodland Country Park, in Normanby, is an easy starting point for walks to Eston Nab; the path leading to the high ground of Eston Moor forms a less severe incline than more popular routes from Eston. It is also on the long-distance path called the Tees Link; the path travels along the route of a former railway which served Normanby Brickworks.

== Landmarks ==
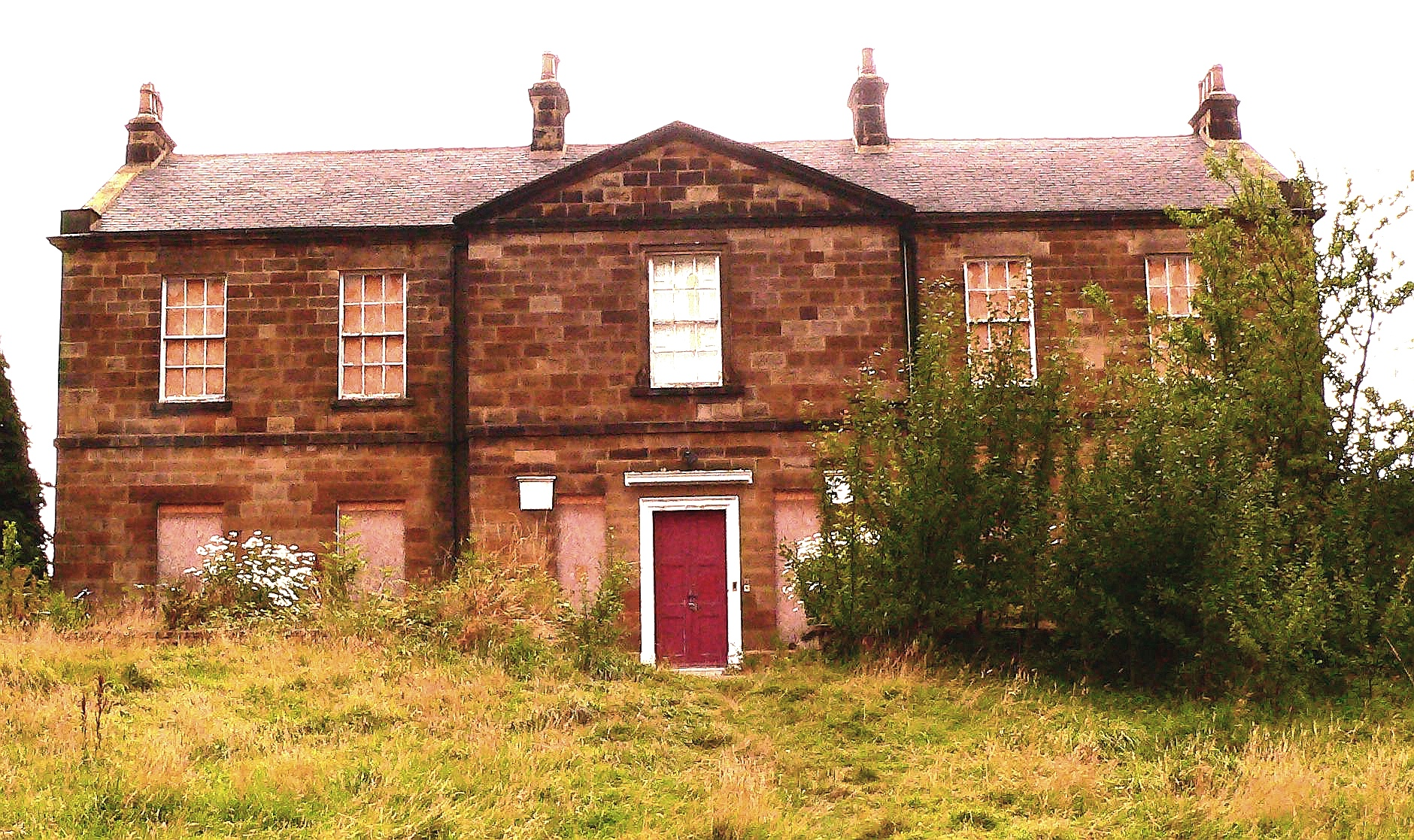
Normanby Hall, in a state of disrepair.

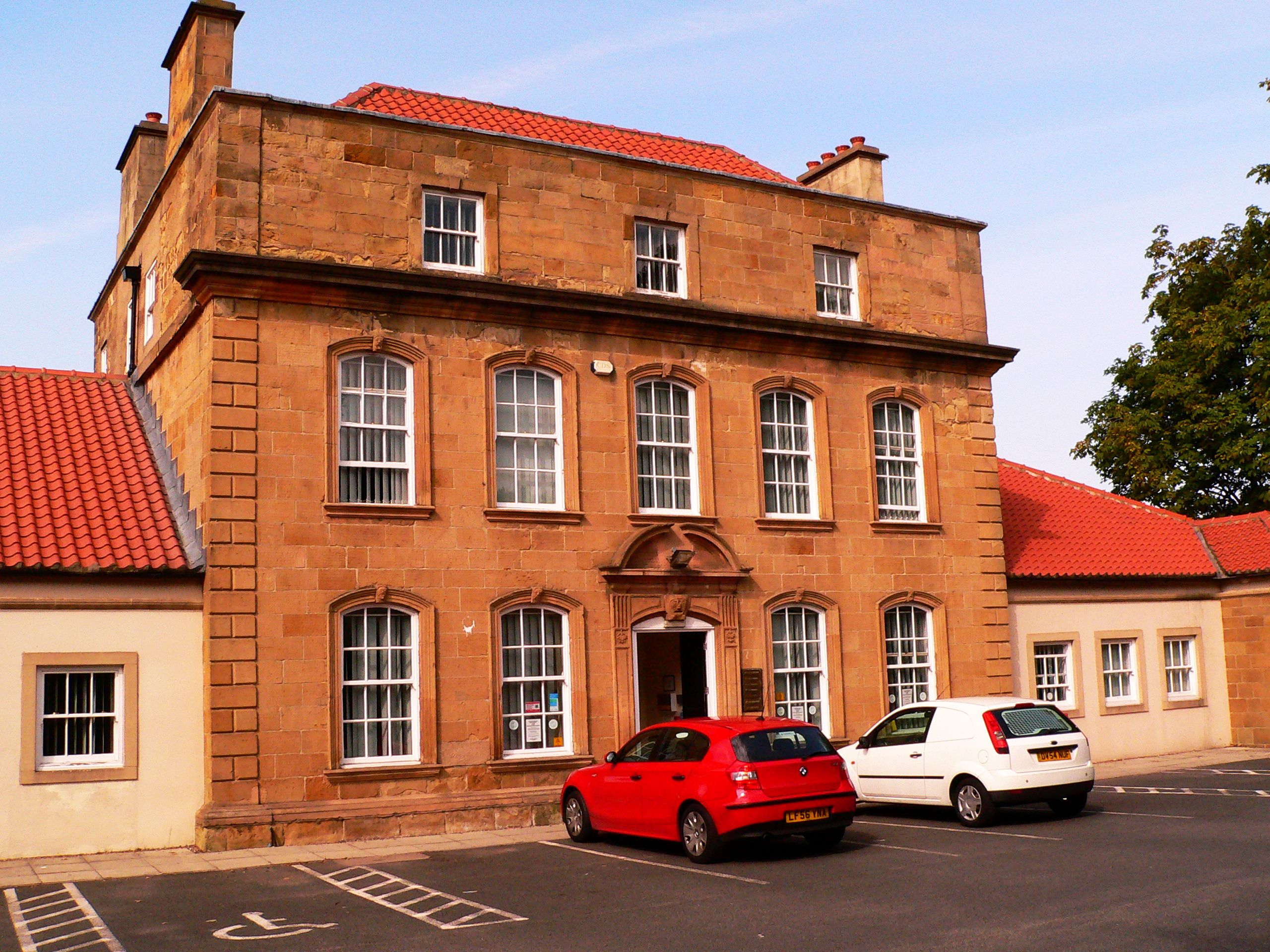
Normanby House is now known as the Manor House and serves as a doctors' surgery.

Normanby Hall is a mansion on the western side of Normanby. The manor of Normanby was held at an early period by the de Brus family, of Skelton Castle; and subsequently passed to Marmaduke de Thweng. Later it came into the possession of the Percys, and then, of the Moneys.

At the beginning of the eighteenth century, the estate belonged to William Pennyman, Esq. When he died, in 1718, buried at Eston Church, his daughters Elizabeth and Joanna, married two brothers – Rev. William Consett and Captain Matthew Consett, sons of William Consett of Linthorpe.

The manor lands were split, Reverend William Consett taking the eastern part of the estate, upon which he built the elegant and commodious Normanby House, which became known as the Manor House. The other brother, Captain Matthew Consett, took the part of the manor with the ancient Hall.

The Hall with a moiety of the estate was purchased in 1748, by Ralph Jackson, on the death of Captain Consett. The common fields around it were enclosed, in 1790, to become parkland for the mansion. It descended through the Jackson family, in the late 1880s, to Major Charles Ward-Jackson M.P., who was lord of the manor, and who died in 1930.

In the twentieth century, it came into the hands of Charles Amer, a former jazzband leader (Charles Amer Orchestra), Middlesbrough F.C. Chairman, owner of the Coatham Hotel, in Redcar, the Marton Hotel and Country Club and, later, property developer. Amer later sold the parkland belonging to the Hall and houses were built. The Hall itself, after several years as a retirement home, is now unoccupied and in a state of disrepair.

== Eston Cemetery ==
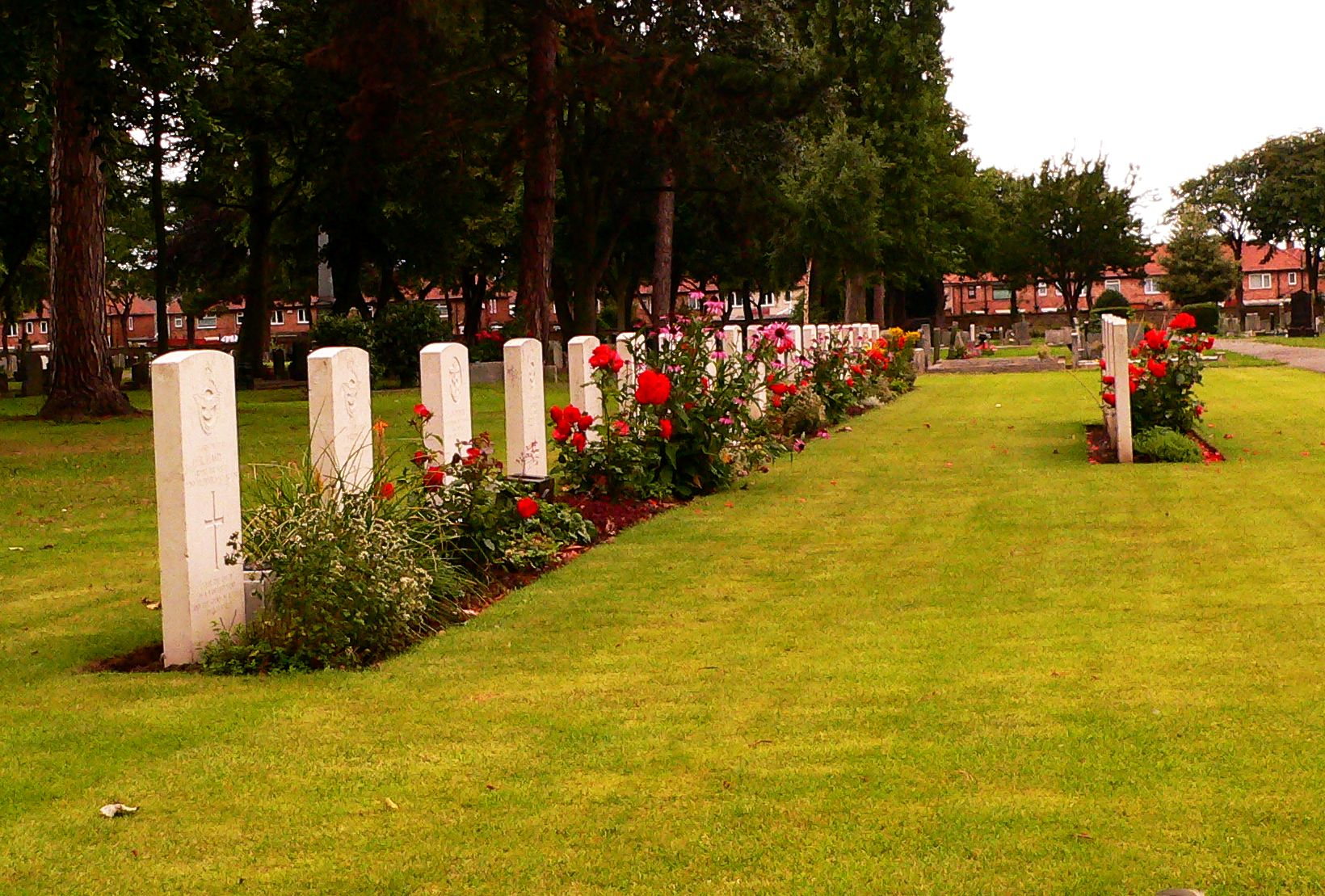
CWGC War Graves at Eston Cemetery

Eston Cemetery is one of those places in the area which was probably named at the time of the Eston Urban District Council, which included Normanby. Nevertheless, Eston Cemetery can be said to be in Normanby.

Still in active use, it was established in 1863, enlarged in 1882, and built as an extension to the pre-reformation church of St Helen, which was one of the many churches belonging to Gisborough Priory. St Helen's has since been dismantled and rebuilt at Beamish Museum. Names on the gravestones tell the story of the families whose daily lives created the history of the wider area, throughout the twentieth century until the present.

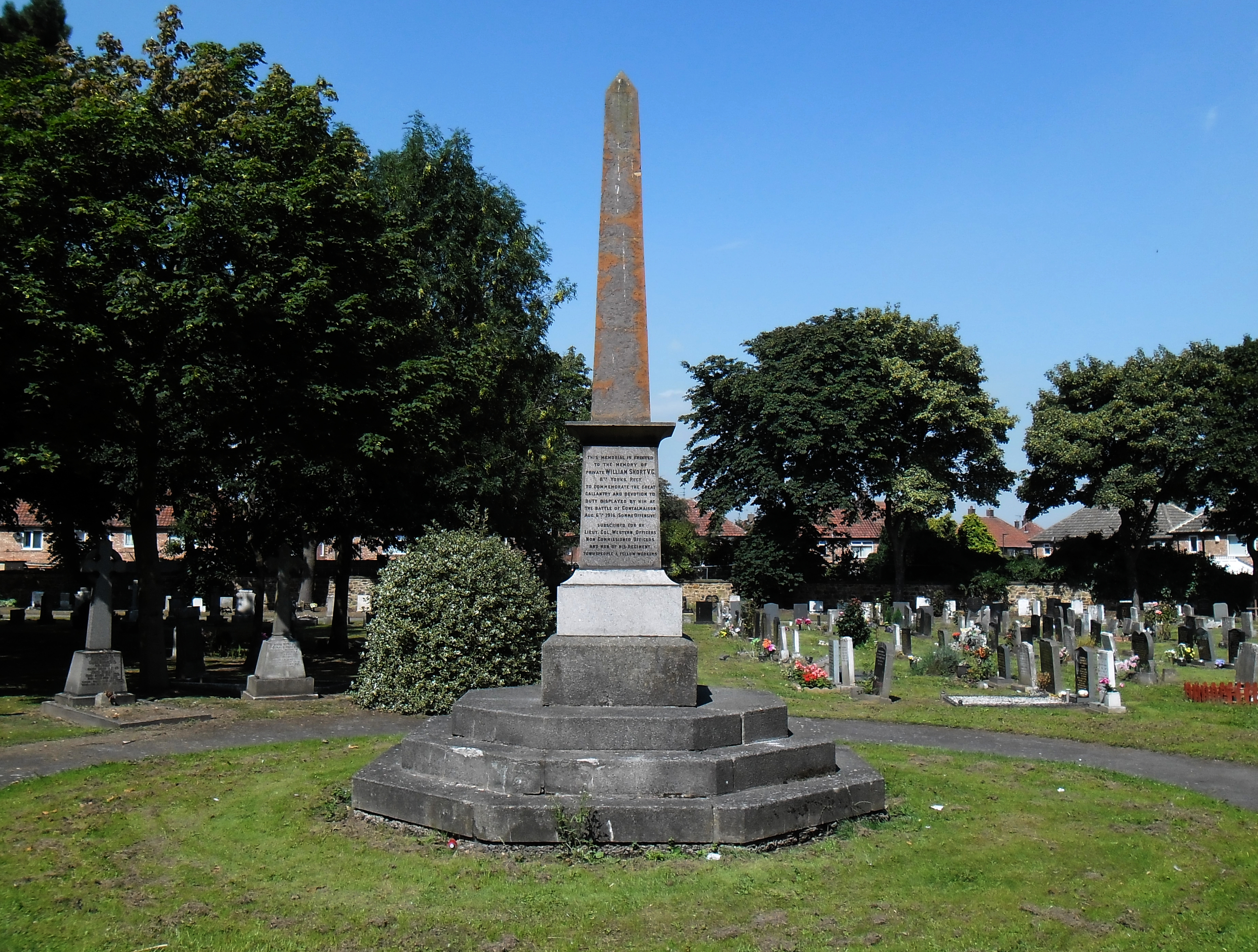
Monument to William Henry Short VC at Eston Cemetery

The Commonwealth War Graves Commission is responsible for commemorating all Commonwealth war dead individually and equally, and to this end, war graves with uniform headstones, set in well kept lawns, can be found in cemeteries throughout the British Commonwealth. The Commission lists ninety-eight such graves, at Eston Cemetery, from the First and Second World Wars.

Having more than 40 war graves, a Cross of Sacrifice designed by architect Reginald Blomfield has been erected. It shows a simple cross embedded with a bronze sword and mounted on an octagonal base to represent the faith of the majority of commemorations. It can be seen in front of the West Lodge.

The cemetery also contains the memorial obelisk to William Henry Short VC (4 February 1884 – 6 August 1916) who was an English recipient of the Victoria Cross, the highest and most prestigious award for gallantry in the face of the enemy that can be awarded to British and Commonwealth forces. He was awarded the medal after being killed showing gallantry and devotion to duty at the Battle of Contalmaison, during the Somme Offensive, in 1916.

== Zoe's Place ==
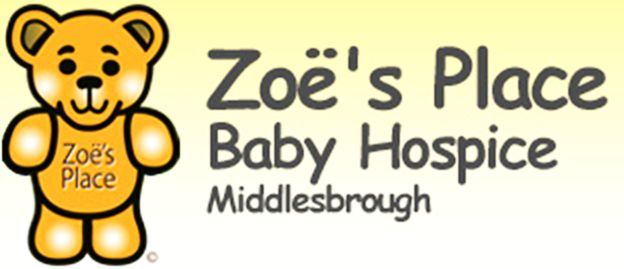
Zoe's Place logo

Normanby is home to Zoe's Place, one of only two baby hospices in England. It offers palliative and respite care for babies and infants up to five years old, who have life-limiting or terminal illnesses.

It was opened by Ann Widdecombe in 2004. The hospice occupies the former Crossbeck Convent which was bought in 1919 to serve as a home to the Catholic religious community of the Sisters of Mercy.

== Sport ==
There is a cricket club, Normanby Hall Cricket Club, alongside Normanby Hall. It is a member of the England and Wales Cricket Board and has teams competing in the North Yorkshire & South Durham Premier Division, Division 1 and Sunday Division 1. At junior level, teams compete in under 11, under 13, under 15 and under 17 sections.

Normanby United Football Club was founded in 1905, it later became known as Eston United. The club was dissolved in 1927.

== Notable people ==
- Charles Ward-Jackson – Conservative Party MP, inherited Normanby Hall. Served as a Major in the Second Boer War and First World War.
- John Raybould (born 1934), first-class cricketer
- Rob Smedley – Former Head of Vehicle Performance Williams Grand Prix Engineering
- Junior Mondal, professional footballer.

== See also ==
- Marske Hall
- Ormesby Hall
