= Ormesby =

Area of Middlesbrough and Redcar and Cleveland, North Yorkshire, England

Coordinates: 54°32′57″N 1°10′54″W

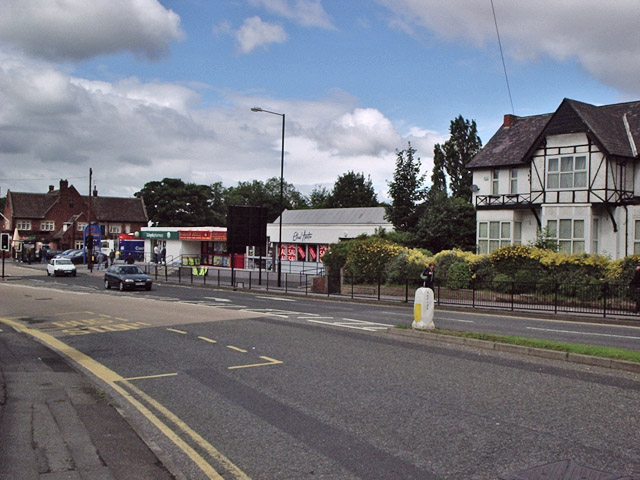
- Ormesby High Street

- Location within North Yorkshire
- Population: 10,714 (2011 census wards)
- OS grid reference: NZ534166
- Unitary authority: Redcar and Cleveland; Middlesbrough
- Ceremonial county: North Yorkshire
- Region: North East
- Country: England
- Sovereign state: United Kingdom
- Places: List: Netherfields; Park End
- Post town: MIDDLESBROUGH
- Postcode district: TS7 and TS3
- Dialling code: 01642
- Police: Cleveland
- Fire: Cleveland
- Ambulance: North East
- UK Parliament: Redcar; Middlesbrough

Ormesby is a village and area split between the unitary authority areas of Middlesbrough and Redcar and Cleveland in North Yorkshire, England.

== Demographics ==
The Ormesby ward, including Overfields and Ormesby Hall, had a population of 5,942 at the 2011 census.

== History ==
Ormesby manor and church are recorded in the Domesday Book of 1086 as the property of 'Orme', to whose name the suffix by (derived from a Viking word for habitation or dwelling place) was added to make Ormesby.

The manor of Ormesby was extensive and stretched about 4 miles (6.4 km) from the banks of the River Tees to the brow of the hill south of Ormesby village. Its east and west boundaries were defined by the becks, Spencer Beck and Ormesby Beck – beck being the Old Norse word for stream (coming from the same root as the word "beach") and is still used present day Northern England. A Middle Beck ran parallel to the others, through the middle of the village and along Church Lane, dividing the manor into two strips of land of roughly the same size.

The village itself was likely centred on Church Lane, being part of the ancient road that linked the River Tees to Guisborough and Stokesley.

In medieval times, a substantial part of the manor was granted to Gisborough Priory. At this time, a grange, also known as a 'priory farm', was established in the general location of the existing Grange Farm and Ormesby Hall. It is possible, therefore, that the grange farmhouse may have occupied the site of the 17th-century house built by the Pennymans and now incorporated into the present Ormesby Hall.

The records from Gisborough Priory suggest that the grange was accompanied by a settlement consisting of two rows of properties facing each other across Church Lane.

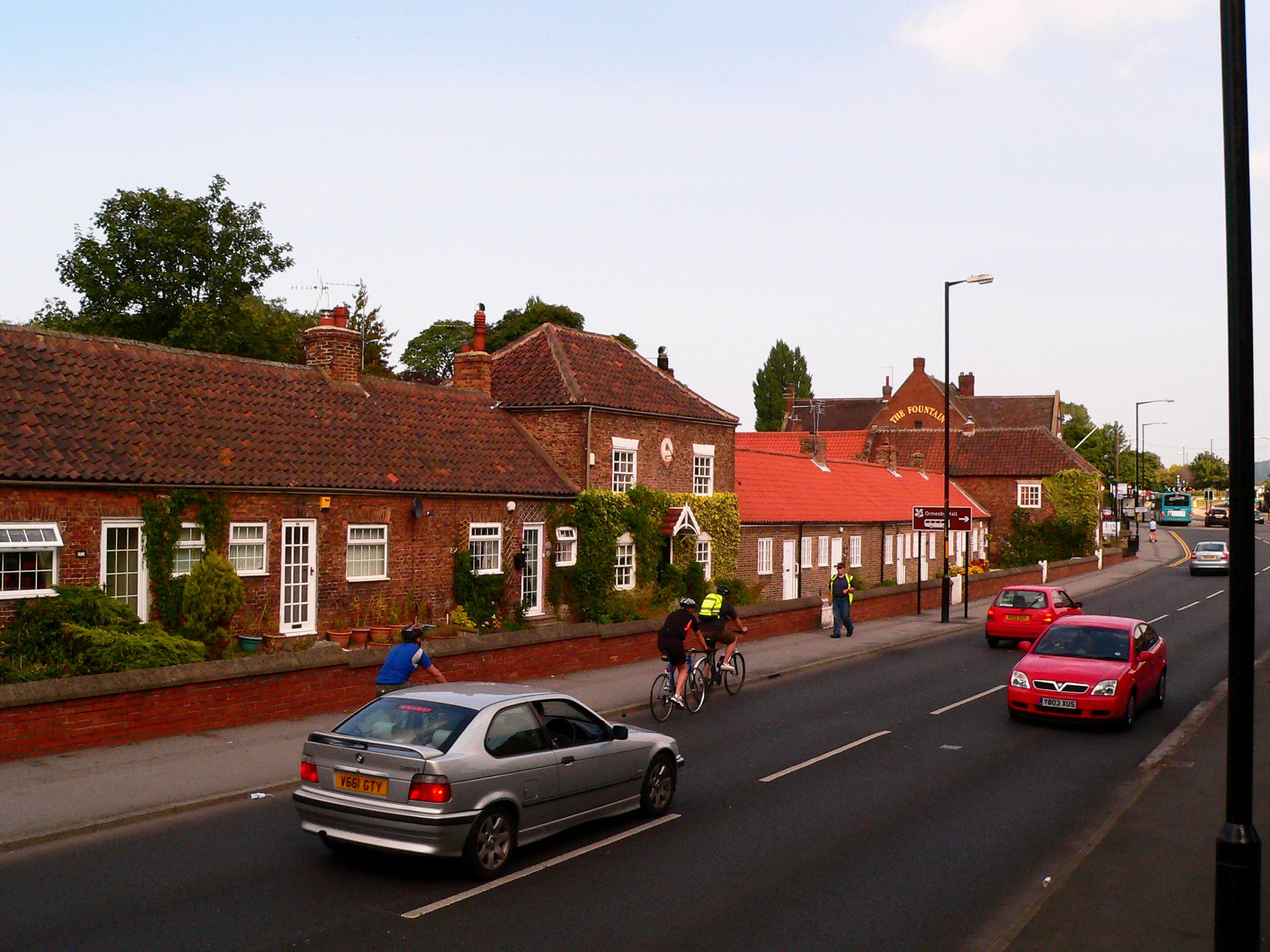
Sundial Row

A surviving remnant of the original Ormesby village is the High Street's 18th-century Sundial Row, a terrace of ex-almshouses and stables which are now private houses. Alongside the almshouses is a betting shop which was once a school, it bears the inscription:

THIS PUBLICK SCHOOL HOUSE WAS ERECTED IN THE YEAR 1744 AND REBUILT IN 1773.

These buildings, together with the Grade I listed National Trust property, Ormesby Hall form the centrepieces to a conservation area.

=== 1900s ===
Miss Elizabeth Caroline Brown, who died in 1905, was a noted local benefactor and paid for the erection of a number of buildings in Ormesby including Ormesby House and the now demolished Ormesby School.

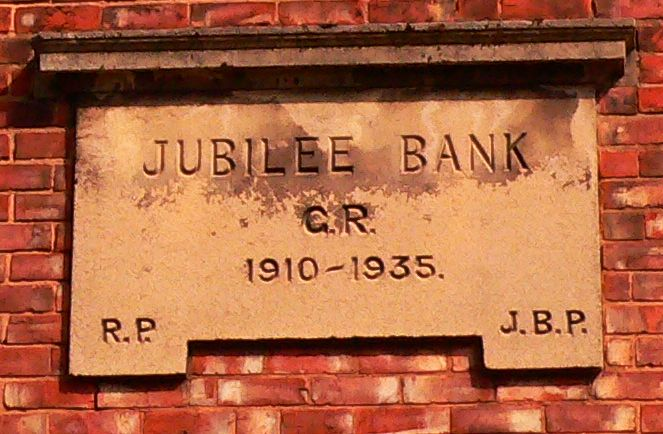
Jubilee Bank was built in the Arts and Crafts vernacular style

Ormesby Hall estate built a row of three brick and tile cottages, where numbers 2–6 Church Lane are now located, at the beginning of the 20th century. Some thirty years later, to mark the Silver Jubilee of King George V in 1935, Colonel Pennyman pulled down the old Black Lion Inn and the cottages on Church Lane to erected Jubilee Bank.

Jubilee Bank was created as a row of twenty-eight estate workers' cottages to replace the four previous buildings. Architects, Kitching & Co of Middlesbrough, designed both rows in the fashionable Arts and Crafts vernacular style. A row of four cottages, opposite Ormesby House, were demolished in the 1960s. Mudd's Cottage, currently numbered 38, and the old Vicarage (now known as Hambleton House) still survive.

Ormesby was an ancient parish in the North Riding of Yorkshire. It included the townships of Eston, Morton, Normanby and Upsall, as well as a township of Ormesby covering the village itself but also stretching northwards to the banks of the River Tees. Each township became a separate civil parish in 1866.

The northernmost tip of Ormesby township, covering the banks of the Tees, was added to the borough of Middlesbrough in 1858. The rest of the township of Ormesby was made a local government district in 1865, governed by a local board. Such local government districts were reconstituted as urban districts in 1894. The urban district of Ormesby saw significant development at its northern end close to Middlesbrough, in an area which became known as North Ormesby. The south of the district, including the old village of Ormesby, remained more rural. As such it was decided in 1913 to split Ormesby; North Ormesby was absorbed into Middlesbrough, whilst the parish of Ormesby was reduced to just cover the southern more rural parts and was downgraded from an urban district to a rural parish within the Middlesbrough Rural District. When the Middlesbrough Rural District was abolished in 1932, Ormesby passed to the Stokesley Rural District.

In 1961 the parish had a population of 5288. On 1 April 1968 the parish was abolished to form Teesside, part also went to Guisborough, and Ormesby became part of the County Borough of Teesside. Six years later in 1974 the county borough was abolished and replaced by the larger new county of Cleveland, which was divided into districts. North Ormesby went back to a re-established borough of Middlesbrough as it had been prior to 1968, whilst the area of the pre-1968 parish of Ormesby was included in the Langbaurgh district (renamed Langbaurgh-on-Tees in 1988), but the parish of Ormesby was not re-established, instead becoming an unparished area. Cleveland was abolished in 1996 and the district council became a unitary authority, changing its name to Redcar and Cleveland at the same time.

== Governance ==
=== 2023 local elections results ===
In the 2023 local elections, the following members were returned to Redcar and Cleveland Borough Council:

Ward	Councillor	Party
Ormesby	Ian Hart	Liberal Democrats
Ormesby	Carole Morgan	Liberal Democrats
Ormesby	Glyn Nightingale	Liberal Democrats

== Landmarks ==
=== Queen Victoria's Diamond Jubilee Memorial ===
The 1897 memorial on Church Lane
Back	Queen Victoria Memorial	Front
Inscription: "This lamp was erected to commemorate the Diamond Jubilee of Her Most Gracious Majesty Queen Victoria by Elizabeth Caroline Brown of Ormesby House A.D. 1897."	Brown erected a stone column, with a lamp at the top, to commemorate HRH Queen Victoria's Diamond Jubilee, in 1897.	The memorial was originally sited at the junction of Church Lane and Ormesby High Street. The lamp, which was damaged when being moved, has since been replaced with a cross.

=== Ormesby Hall ===
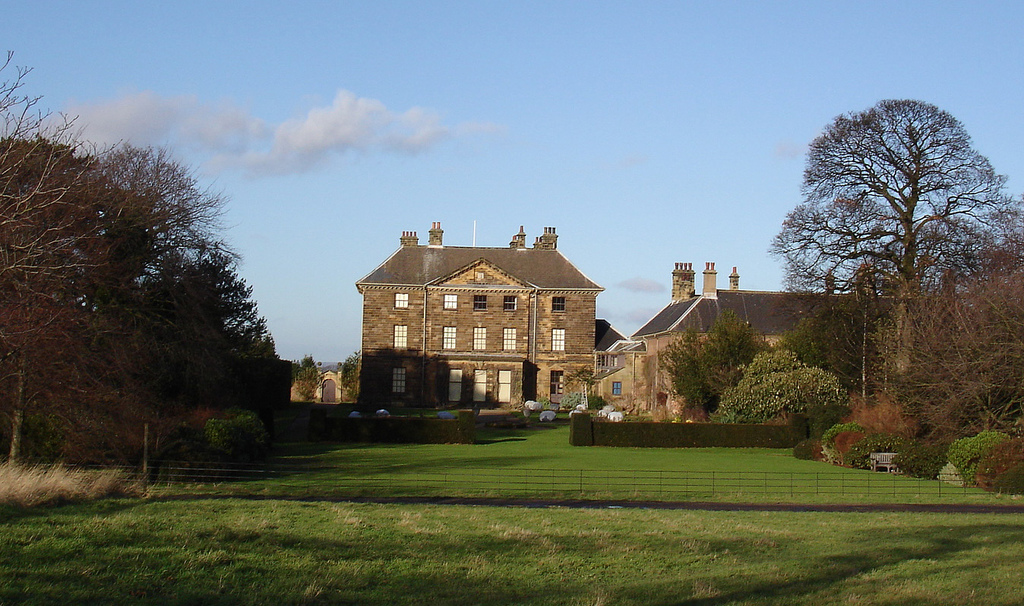
Ormesby Hall

The manor of Ormesby was acquired by the Pennyman family when they bought up lands formerly owned by Gisborough Priory. As soon as the first parcel of land was acquired, in about 1600, they set about building what would have been little more than a large farmhouse and was probably on the site of the medieval grange buildings. More of the surrounding land was bought until the family owned the whole manor of Ormesby.

They had to sell the land's eastern half in 1715, only to buy it again in 1771 and sold it again to a John Brown of Liverpool. This subdivision of the estate inevitably influenced the way in which Ormesby developed over the next 200 years. With some of the Ormesby manor changing hands, more than once, a second house was built by the new owners, in the 1700s.

From the Victorian period the park was used by the Pennyman family, as well as the local community, for sports, with cricket and football in the summer (the cricket pitch remains) and golf in the winter months. Horticultural shows, garden fetes and political rallies followed. The Hall was, from 1664 until 1852, the seat of the Pennyman of Ormesby baronetcy.

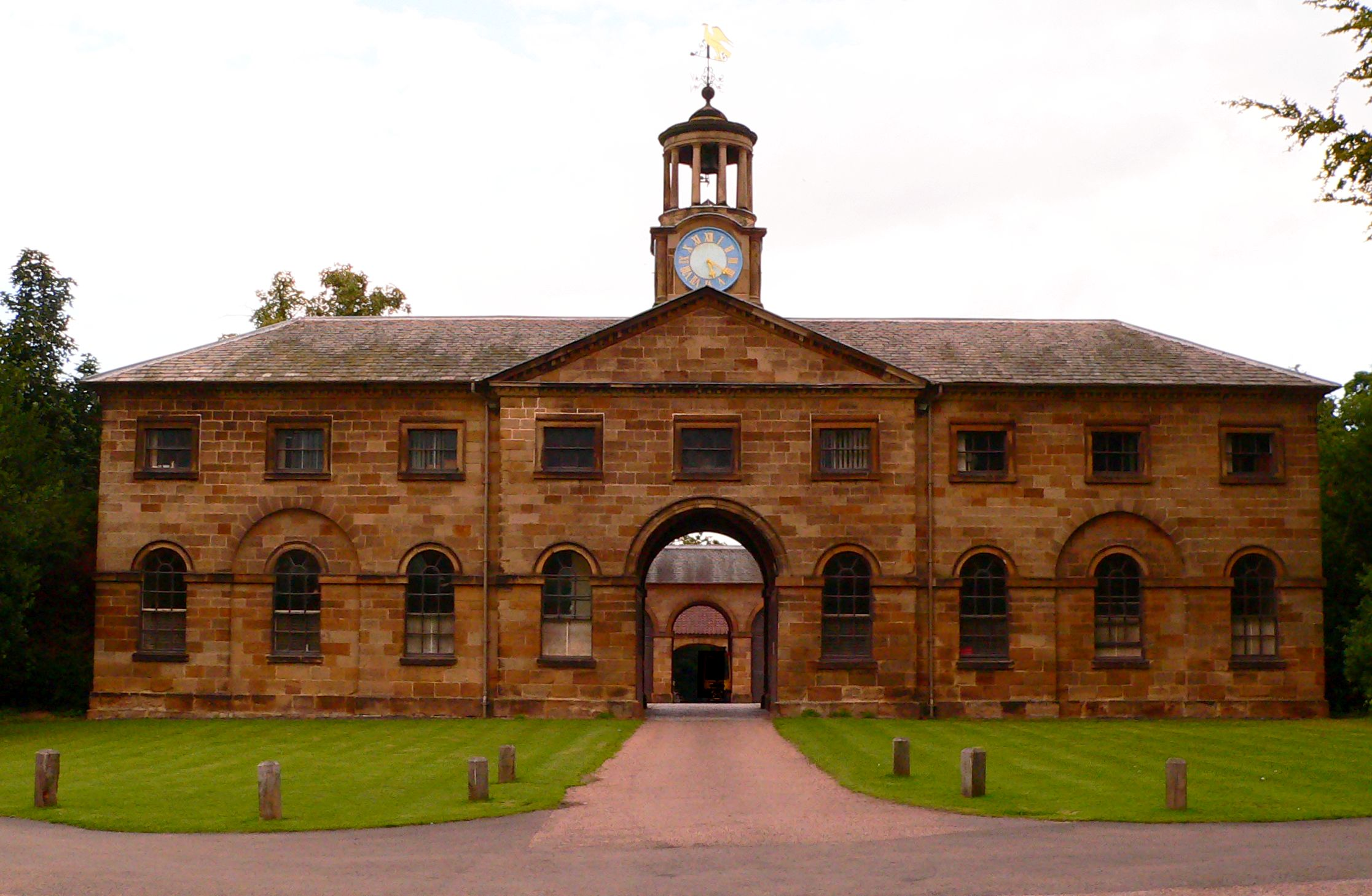
Ormesby Hall Stables

Today, Ormesby Hall, is open to the public. The stable block housed the horses of the Cleveland Police Mounted Section, until it was disbanded in 2013.

=== Ormesby House ===
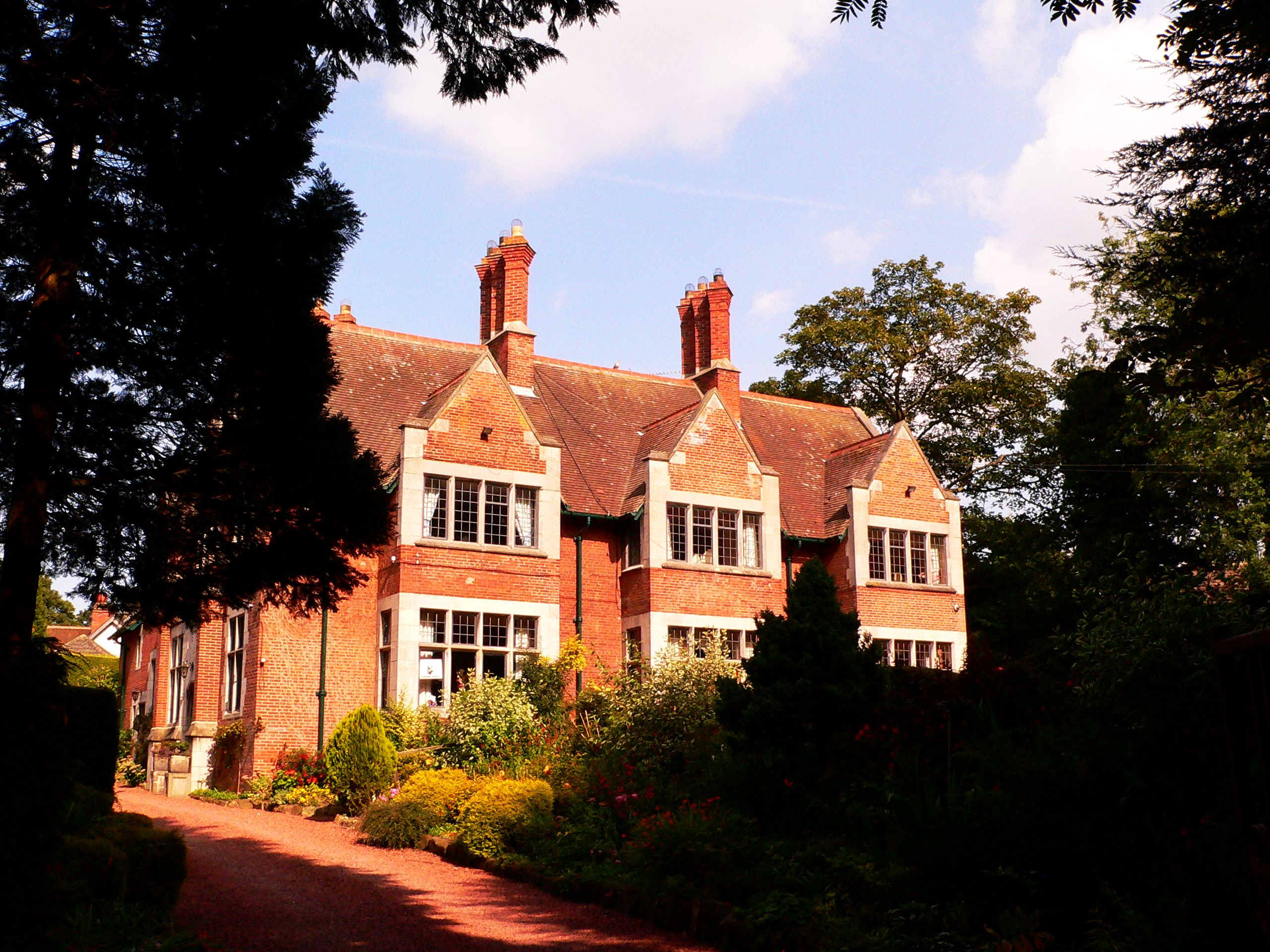
Ormesby House, a 1904 rebuild in the Jacobethan style

Rebuilding on the former 18th century Ormesby Manor House's site, a new Ormesby Manor House was built in 1904 by its owner, Miss Elizabeth Caroline Brown. The architect, Fred Rowntree, designed the detached house in a Jacobethan style with red brick, concrete dressings and to be set back into its gardens. It is probable that the subterranean remains of the house survive under the early 20th century house.

== Religion ==
=== St Cuthbert's Anglican Church ===
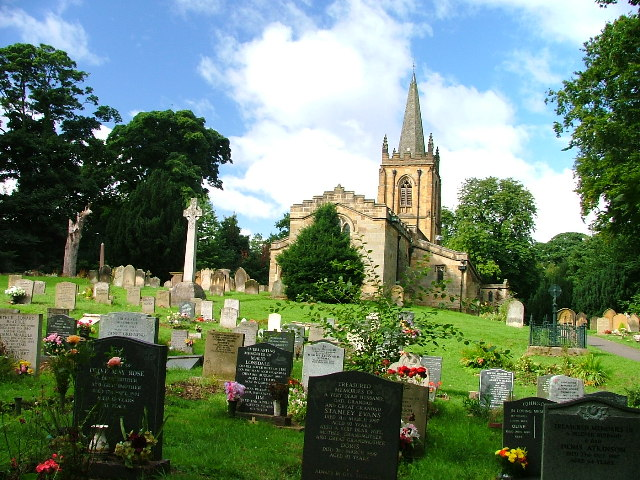
The Parish Church of St Cuthbert

Throughout the 19th century, Ormesby underwent many changes. Only minor alterations and extensions were carried out to Ormesby Hall, but the adjacent St Cuthbert's Anglican Church was largely rebuilt. This took place between 1875 and 1907 to designs in the Decorated style by architects W. S. & W.L. Hicks. The new building incorporated the Anglo Saxon foundations, carved work and re-dressed masonry from the 12th-century church.

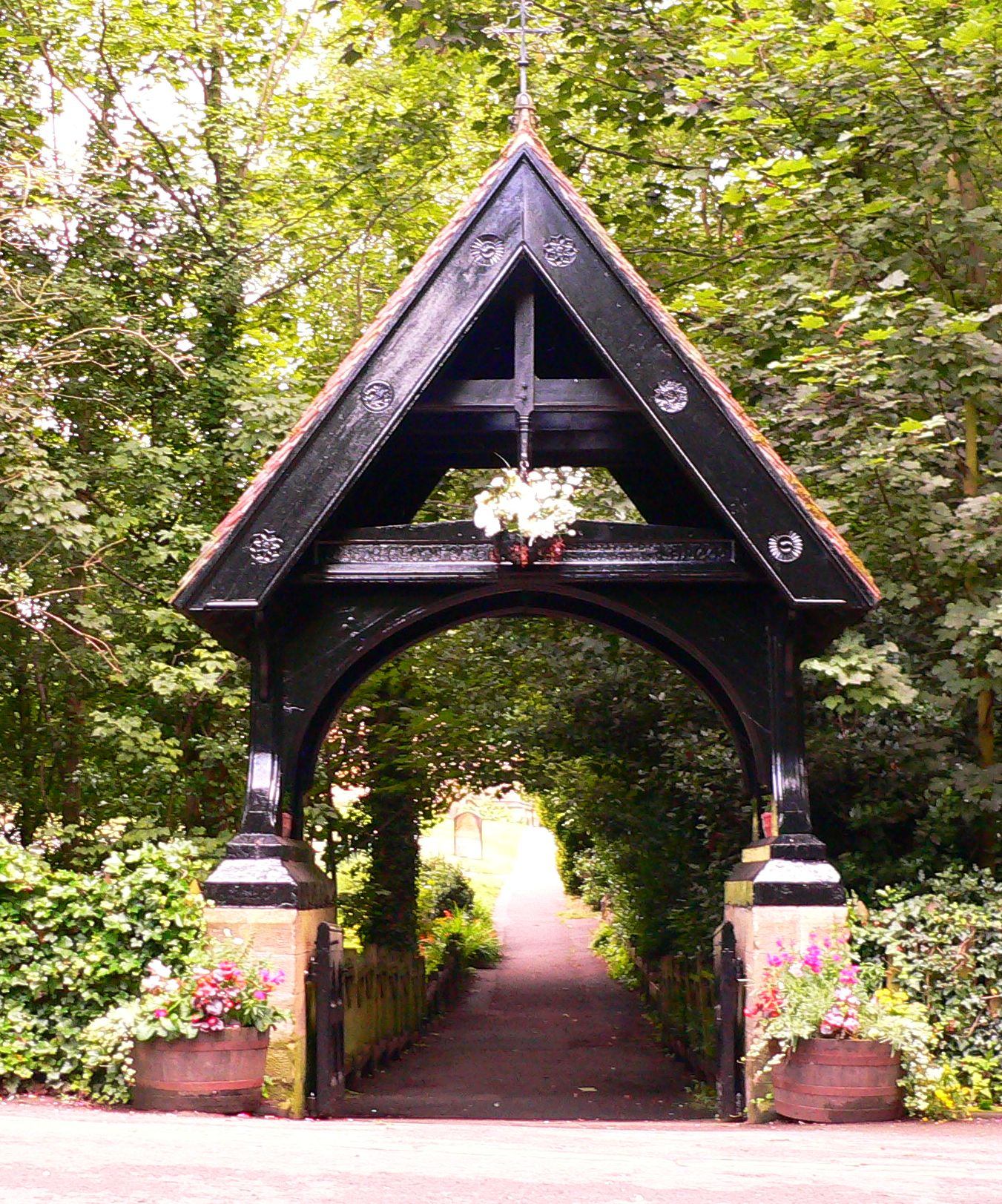
The oak lych-gate to St Cuthbert's churchyard

In 1883, the oak lych-gate was added to the Church Lane entrance to the churchyard. Elizabeth Brown paid for the erection of the church's tower, spire and her own cast-iron railed (grade II listed) churchyard monument.

=== St Gabriel's Catholic Church ===
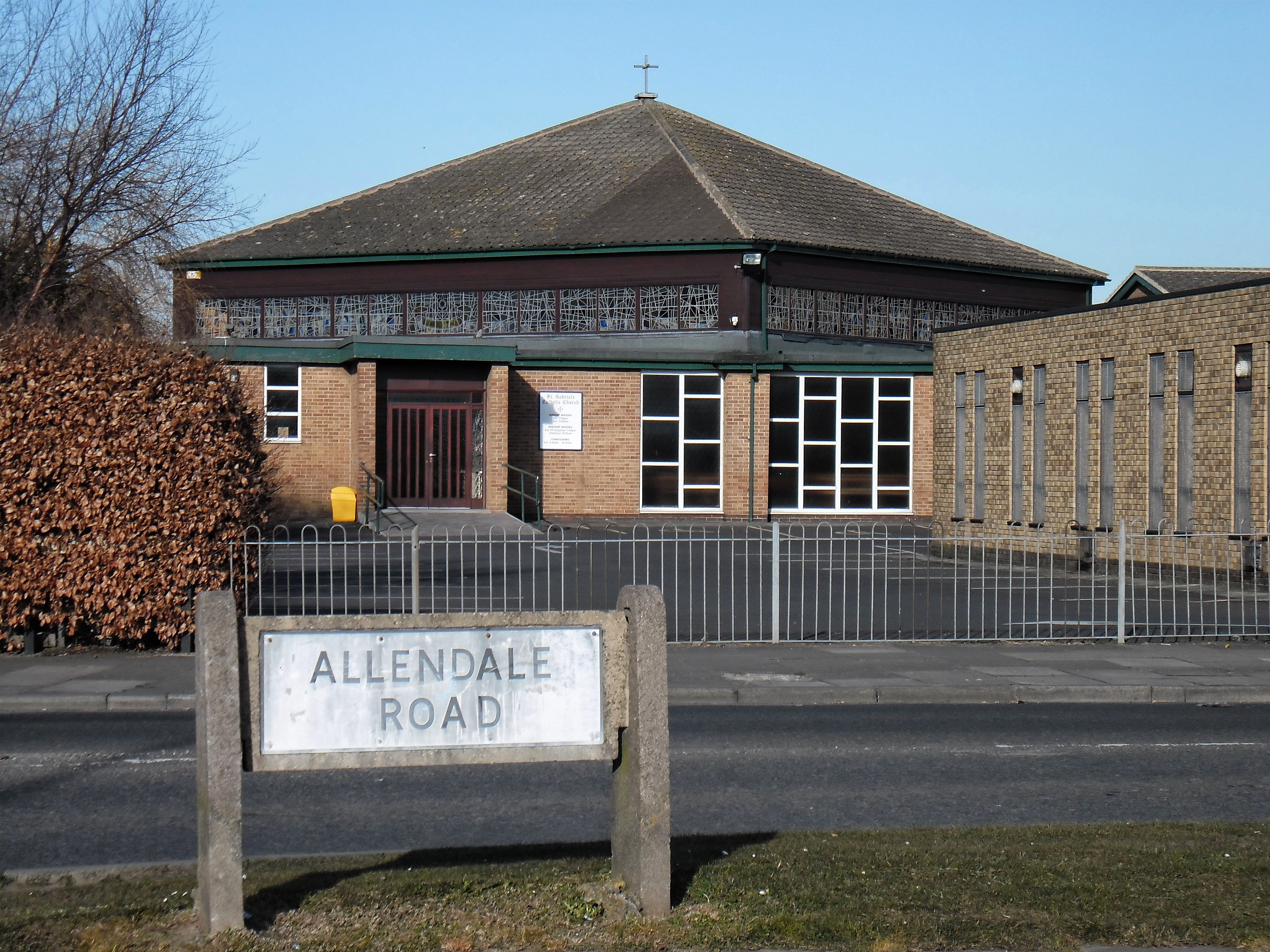
St Gabriel's Catholic Church, in Ormesby

Ormesby expanded, in the 1960s and 70s. Farmland was replaced with social housing, in the council estates of Netherfields, Overfields and Spencerbeck. Private houses were also built during this time, mainly in the Ormesby Bank area, and Priestfields. Newly arrived Catholic families needed a church and primary school. These were built on Allendale Road. First, the school and then a church hall, with a small chapel. Mass was celebrated here from 1968. St Gabriel's church was built between 1974 and 1975. The architects were Frank Swainston and Company. It is built in a modern auditorium style, with a semi-circular interior.

== Schools ==
Schools in Ormesby are: Ormesby Primary School, St Gabriel's RC Primary School, Overfields Primary School, Pennyman Primary School and Outwood Academy Ormesby.

== Gallery ==
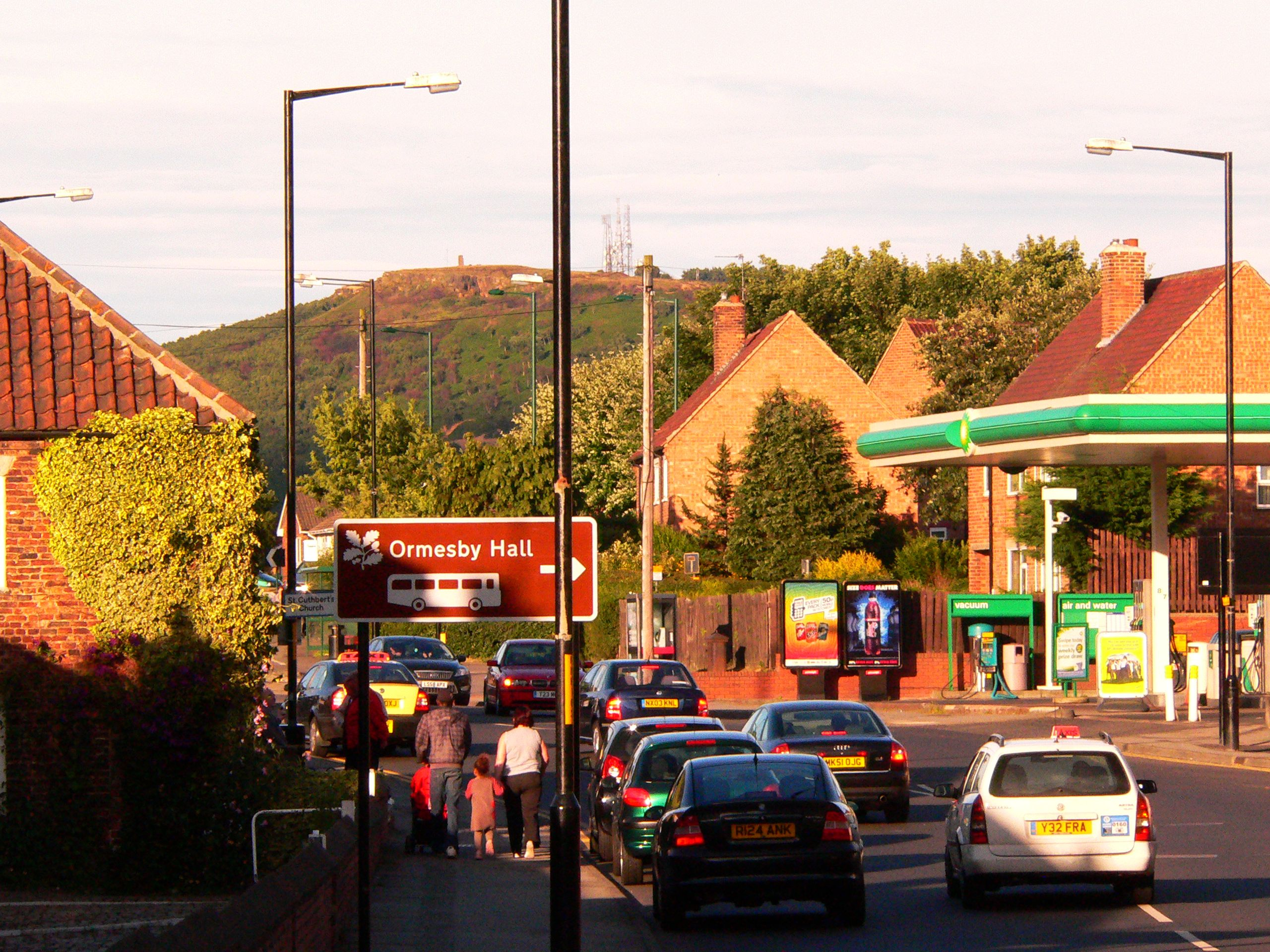
Eston Nab looms in the distance beyond Ormesby village.

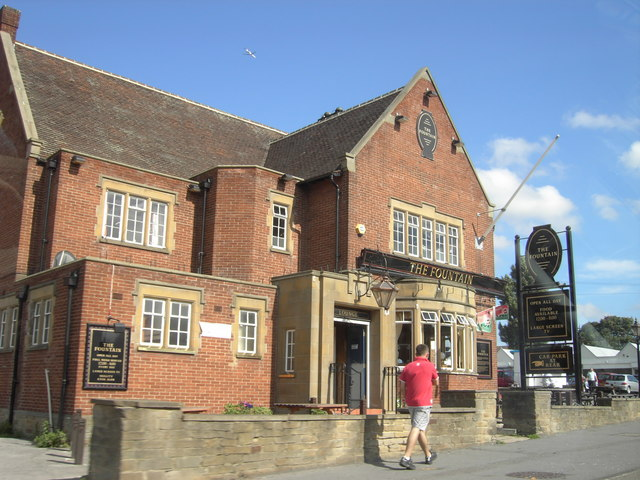
The Fountain Pub on High Street in Ormesby.

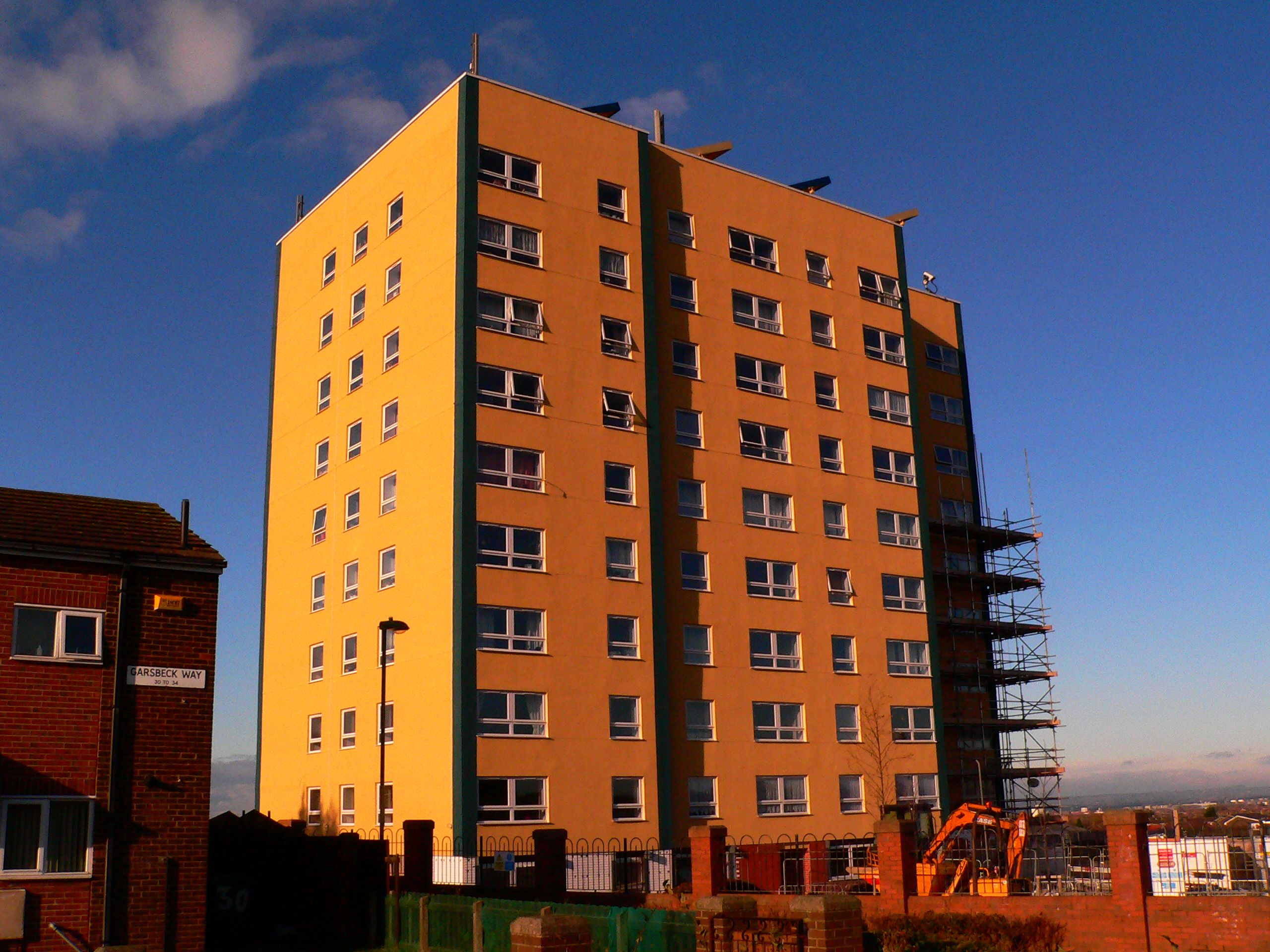
Spencerbeck House, Ormesby. Redcar and Cleveland's only high rise block of flats.

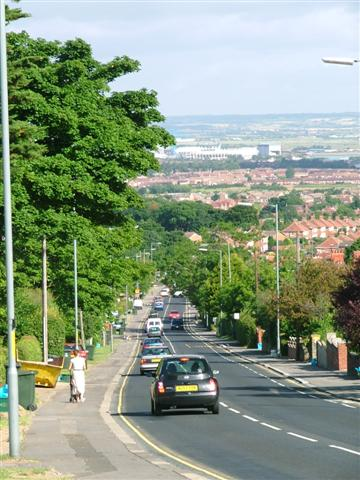
Ormesby Bank rises as a steep incline and offers views of the Middlesbrough.

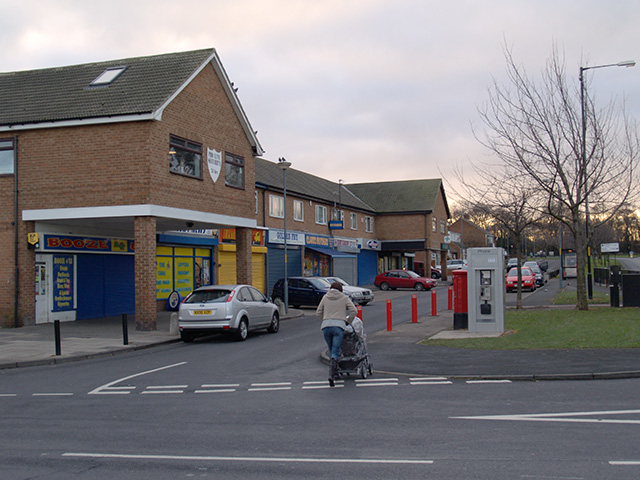
Priestfields shops.

== See also ==
- Normanby Hall
