= John Raybould =

English cricketer

Personal information
- Full name: John Griffith Raybould
- Born: 26 July 1934 (age 92); Normanby, Yorkshire, England
- Batting: Left-handed
- Bowling: Leg break googly

Domestic team information
- Years: Team
- 1957–1959: Oxford University

Career statistics
Competition	First-class
Matches	18
Runs scored	281
Batting average	12.77
100s/50s	0/0
Top score	81*
Balls bowled	2,322
Wickets	34
Bowling average	38.29
5 wickets in innings	0
10 wickets in match	0
Best bowling	4/31
Catches/stumpings	8/–
- Source: Cricinfo, 30 May 2019

John Griffith Raybould (born 26 July 1934) is an English former first-class cricketer.

Raybould was born at Normanby in July 1934, and later attended New College, Oxford. While studying at Oxford he made his debut in first-class cricket for Oxford University against Yorkshire at Oxford in 1957. He made seventeen further appearances in first-class cricket for Oxford University across the 1958 and 1959 seasons. As a left-handed batsman he scored 263 runs, with a high score of 81 not out. With his leg break googly bowling, he took 30 wickets at an average of 37.13, with best figures of 4 for 31. He later made a first-class appearance for the Free Foresters against Oxford University in 1962, taking four wickets in the match.
