= Eston Nab =

Rocky outcrop in North Yorkshire, England

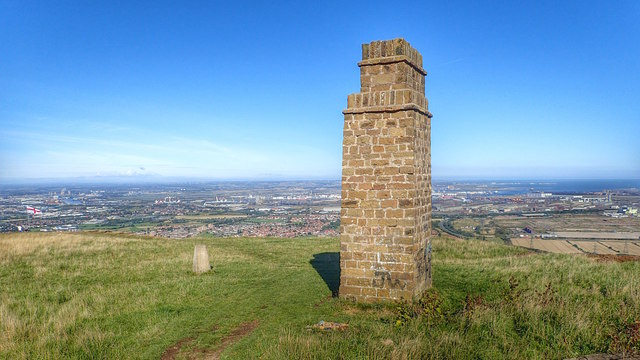
- Eston Beacon on the nab

Highest point
- Elevation: 242 m (794 ft)
- Listing: (none)
- Coordinates: 54°33′25.82″N 1°7′20.69″W

Geography
- Location: Eston, Redcar and Cleveland, North Yorkshire, England
- Parent range: Cleveland Hills
- OS grid: NZ568183
- Topo map: OS

Eston Nab is a rocky outcrop hill in the town of Eston, Redcar and Cleveland, North Yorkshire, England.

A nab is a rocky promontory, and Eston Nab, marking the highest point – at 242 metres (794 ft) – on the escarpment which forms Eston Hills, appears as a clear sandstone cliff on the northernmost edge of Eston Moor. It overlooks the town of Eston, which is part of Redcar and Cleveland, and can be seen from beyond Hartlepool and Peterlee on the northern side of Tees Bay.

It is the site of Bronze Age burial mounds and an Iron Age hill fort. However, regardless of all its history, to local people, the name of Eston Nab is synonymous with the monument that stands there. When families went out for a walk together – the monument at Eston Nab was the destination of choice.

== Historical site ==
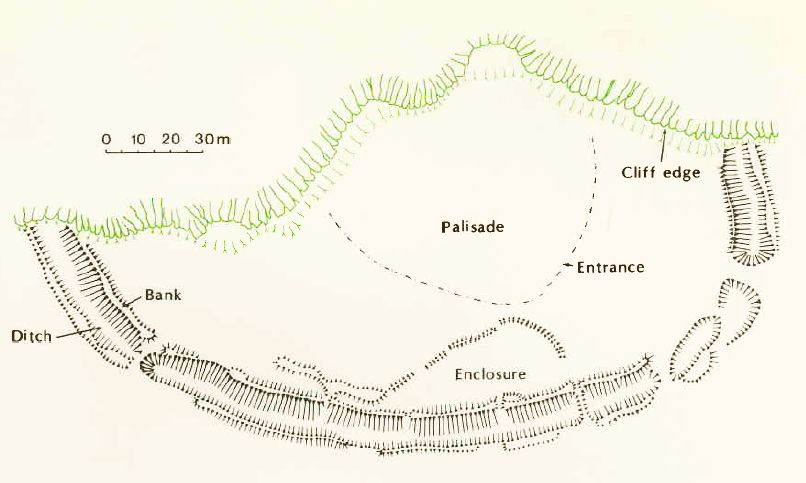
Diagram showing the site of the Iron Age hillfort at Eston Nab

Remains from the Bronze Age have been found, such as flint arrowheads, possibly date back to between 6000 and 4000 BC.

Frank Elgee, curator of the Dorman Museum, Middlesbrough, in 1927, uncovered parts of an earthenware cremation urn, together with burnt bone and flint. These possibly dated from 1800 BC.

There was a substantial Iron Age hill fort at Eston Nab. Boulder walls and ditches are still visible even though they were built in around 700 BC.

Eston Hills, of which it is the highest point, had a warren of cavernous tunnels carved into them, to create the ironstone mines that closed in 1949. They formed the original basis for the iron and steel industry on the River Tees and the building of Middlesbrough. Eston Nab featured in the film, A Century in Stone, a film about the Eston mines. The monument was shown as it was in the early 19th century.

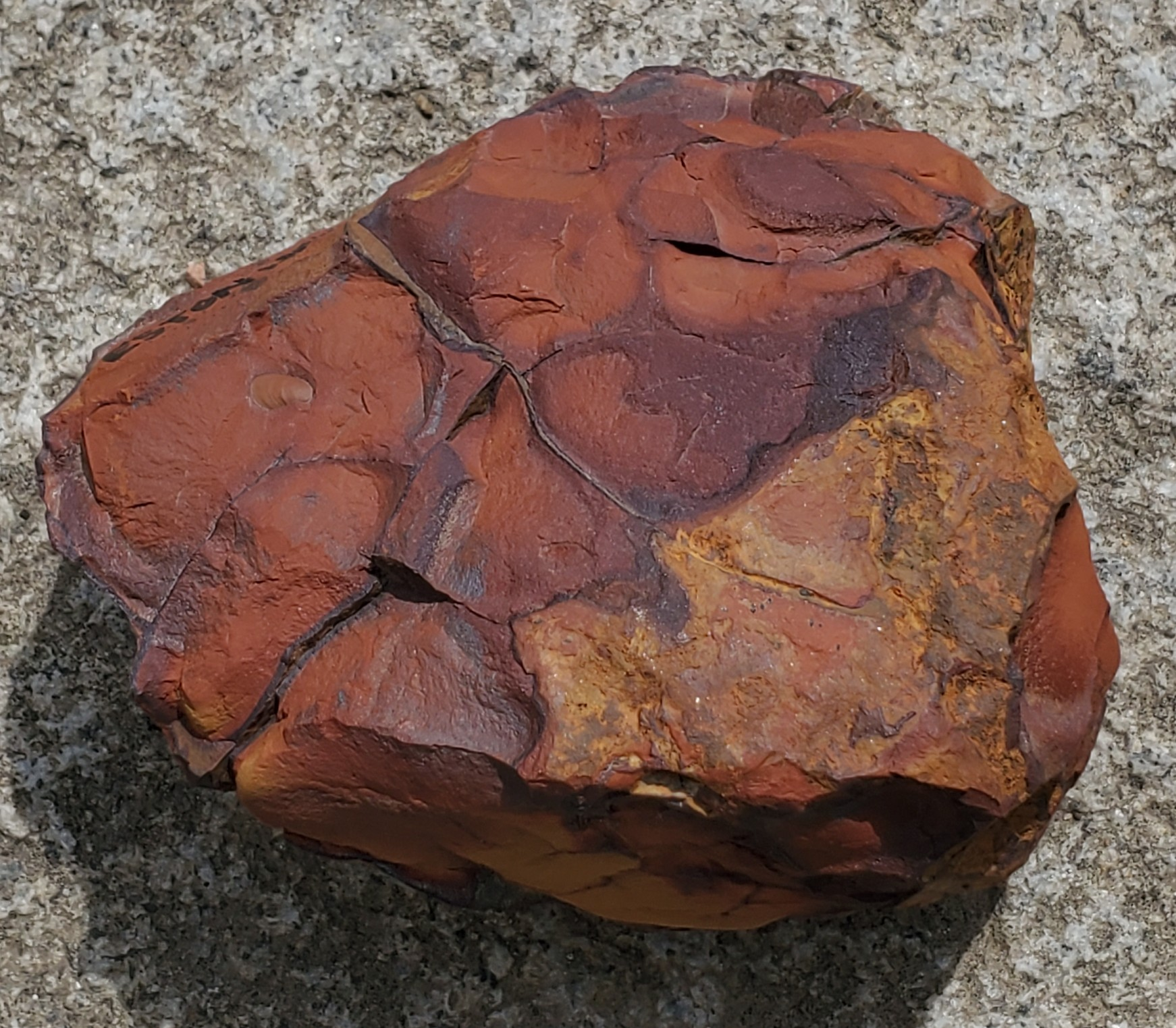
10 cm Rock containing iron ore deposits from Eston Nab

In early 2014, for the sum of £15,000, Eston Nab was purchased from its private owner by a voluntary organisation known as the 'Friends of Eston Hills'. A co-founder of the organisation was Craig Hornby, a local film-maker whose best-known work, A Century in Stone, tells the story of iron-stone mining in Eston Hills. The property acquired includes land around the area of the monument, between the privately owned Bauer Teesside site and Eston Moor, which is already in public hands.

=== Monument ===
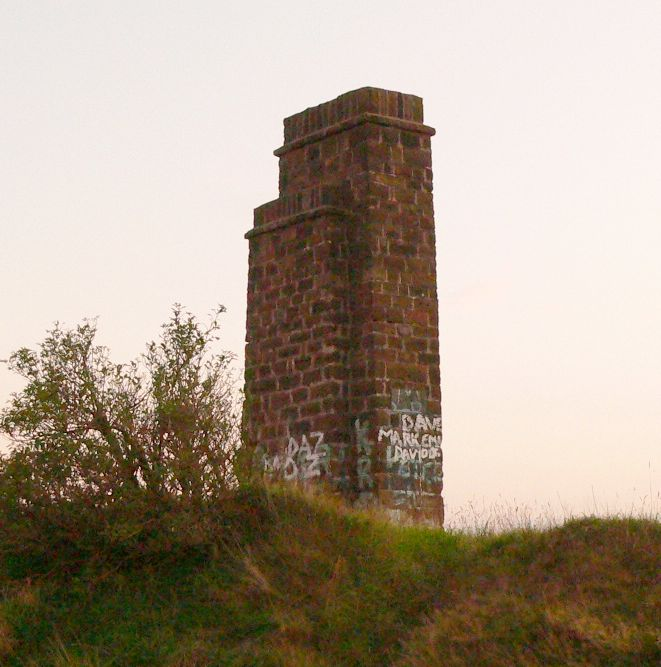
The monument at Eston Nab (2006)

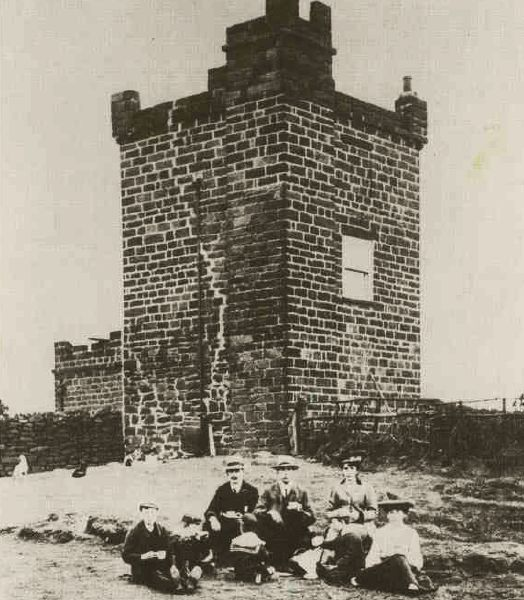
The Beacon at Eston Nab (1907)

The monument is in the form of a pillar made of sandstone bricks. It was originally built as a lookout tower and beacon to warn of invasion during the Napoleonic Wars in the early 19th century. With the advent of ironstone mining in Eston Hills, the beacon was used as a house and survived until 1956. It was then demolished and later rebuilt into its present form.

A plaque on the side of the monument reads:

"This monument is placed here to mark the
site of the beacon tower which was erected
by Thomas Jackson of Lackenby about 1800 as
a look-out post against invasion during the
Napoleonic wars and which again served the same
purpose in the second world war of 1939–1945.
It stands within a Bronze Age fortified
camp whose outer defences can be seen.
Erected in 1956."

== Wildlife and recreation ==
At only 242 metres (794 ft) above sea level at its highest point, Eston Nab is classed as lowland heath.

Bird species found at the heath includes, lapwing, curlew, green woodpecker and linnet, whilst there are various butterflies and dragonflies.

The area around Eston Nab is managed for its wildlife, archaeology and amenity. Many people use the hills for walking, cycling, horse riding as well as (unauthorised) off road motorcycling. There are several self-guided walk leaflets, which take in points of interest. These are available at the Flatts Lane Woodland Country Park Visitor Centre, Normanby.

The Eston Hills provide access to the wider countryside via the public right of way network. The land owned or managed by the Redcar and Cleveland Borough Council is mostly bordered by farmland. Eston Nab commands an excellent view of the nearby Roseberry Topping, which stands higher at 320 metres (1,050 ft).

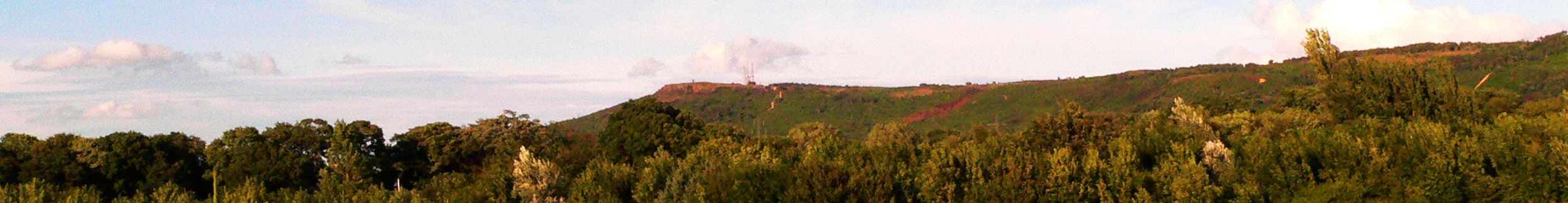
View of Eston Nab from Ainstable Road, Ormesby

== Bauer Radio ==
Eston Nab is also used by Bauer Radio as a site for digital radio masts – broadcasting local radio from this convenient high spot. The advent of these communication towers was controversial when they were first installed, because the monument at Eston Nab, and the skyline that it was part of, had become such a familiar symbol of the area. As part of the mast installation a road was extended to the summit of the Nab.

== Gallery ==
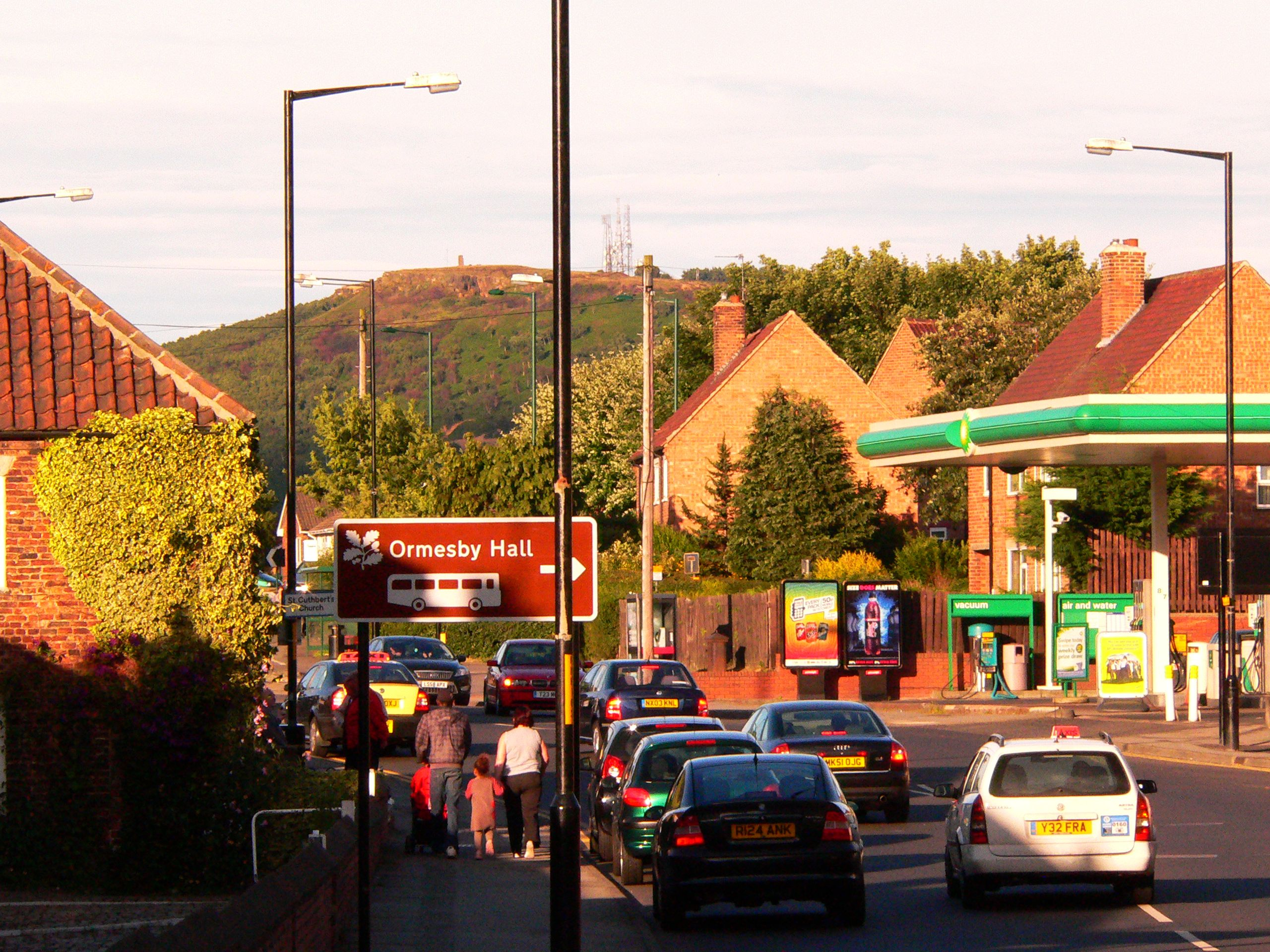
Eston Nab looms in the distance beyond Ormesby village

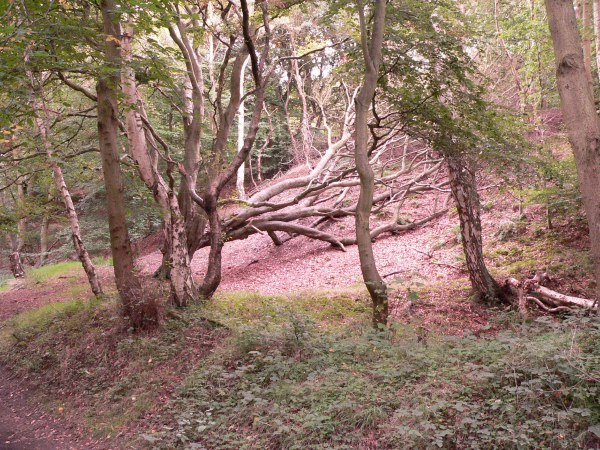
The woods on the ascent to Eston Nab

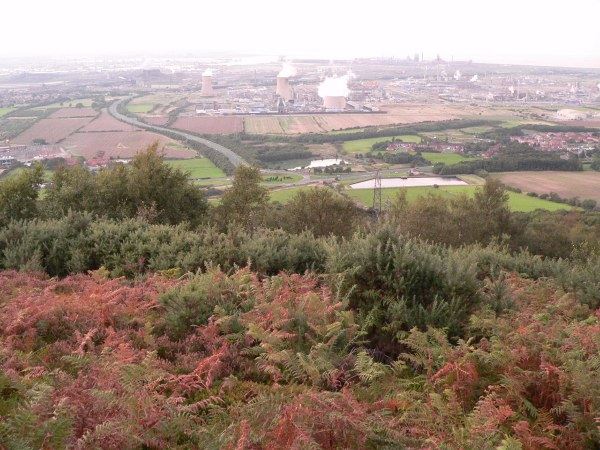
A view from Eston Nab

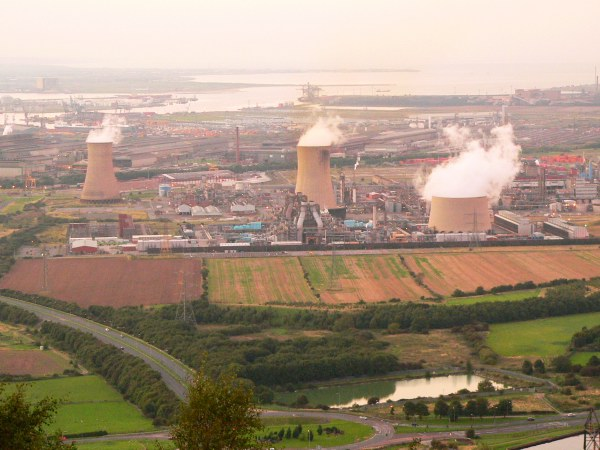
A view from Eston Nab

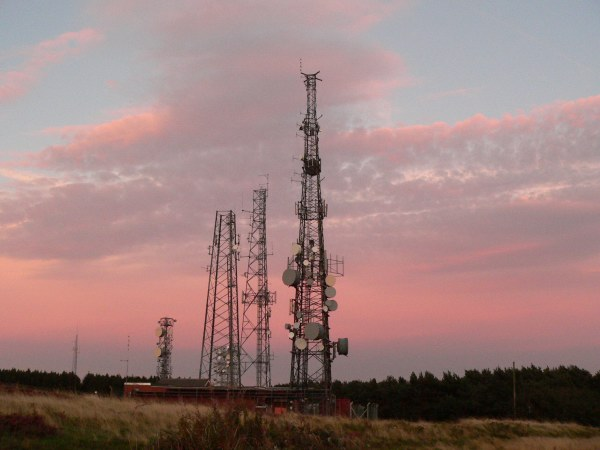
The communications masts of Bauer Radio at Eston Nab

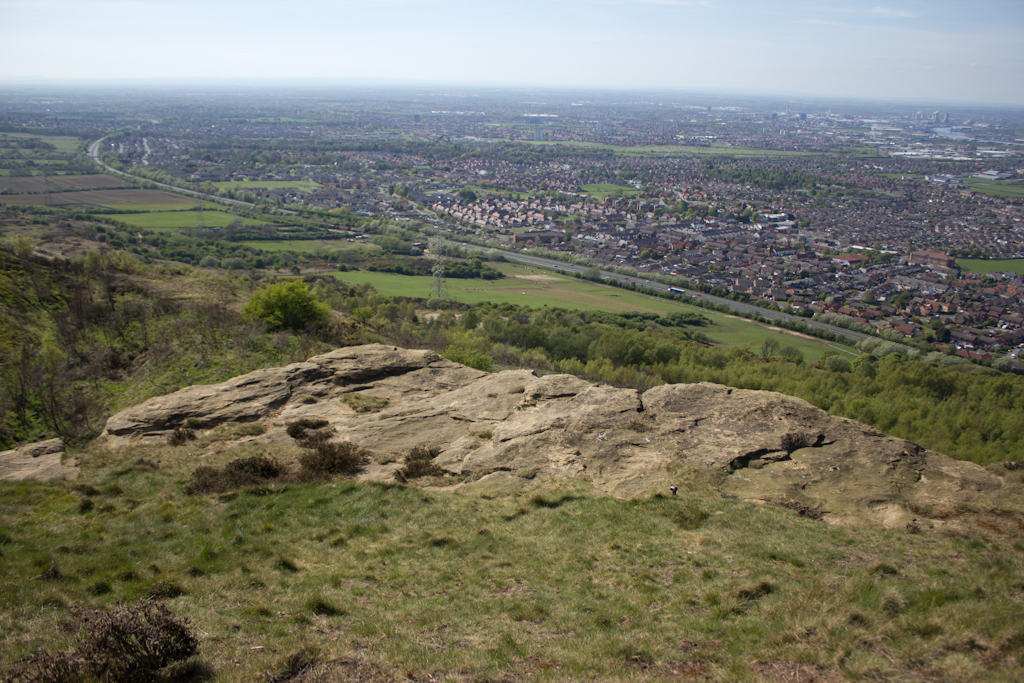
View of Middlesbrough from Eston Nab

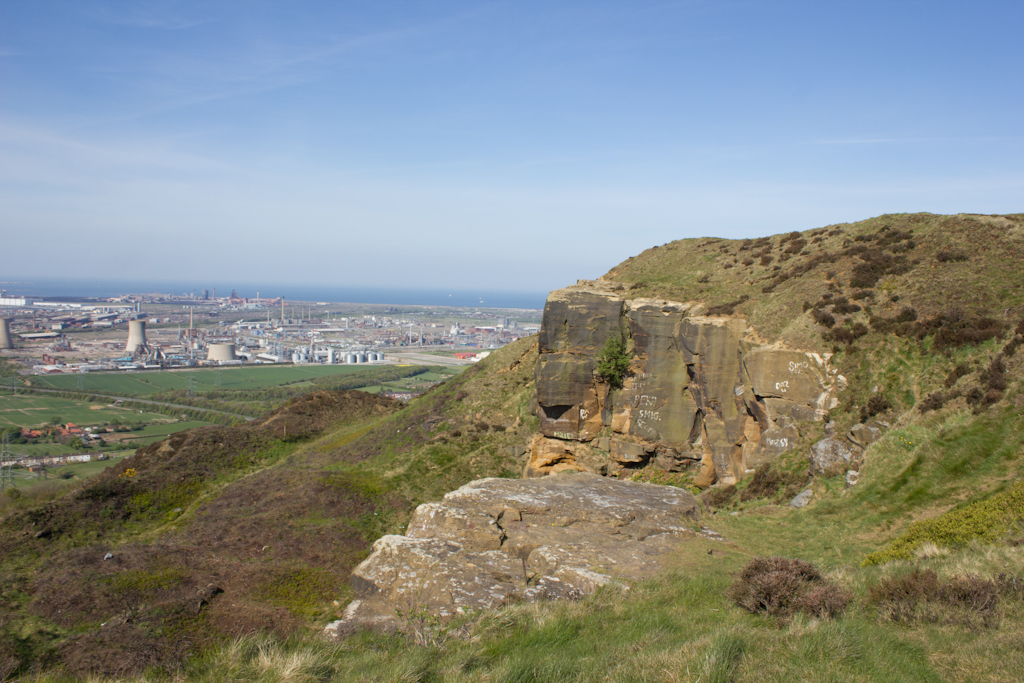
View of Redcar from Eston Nab

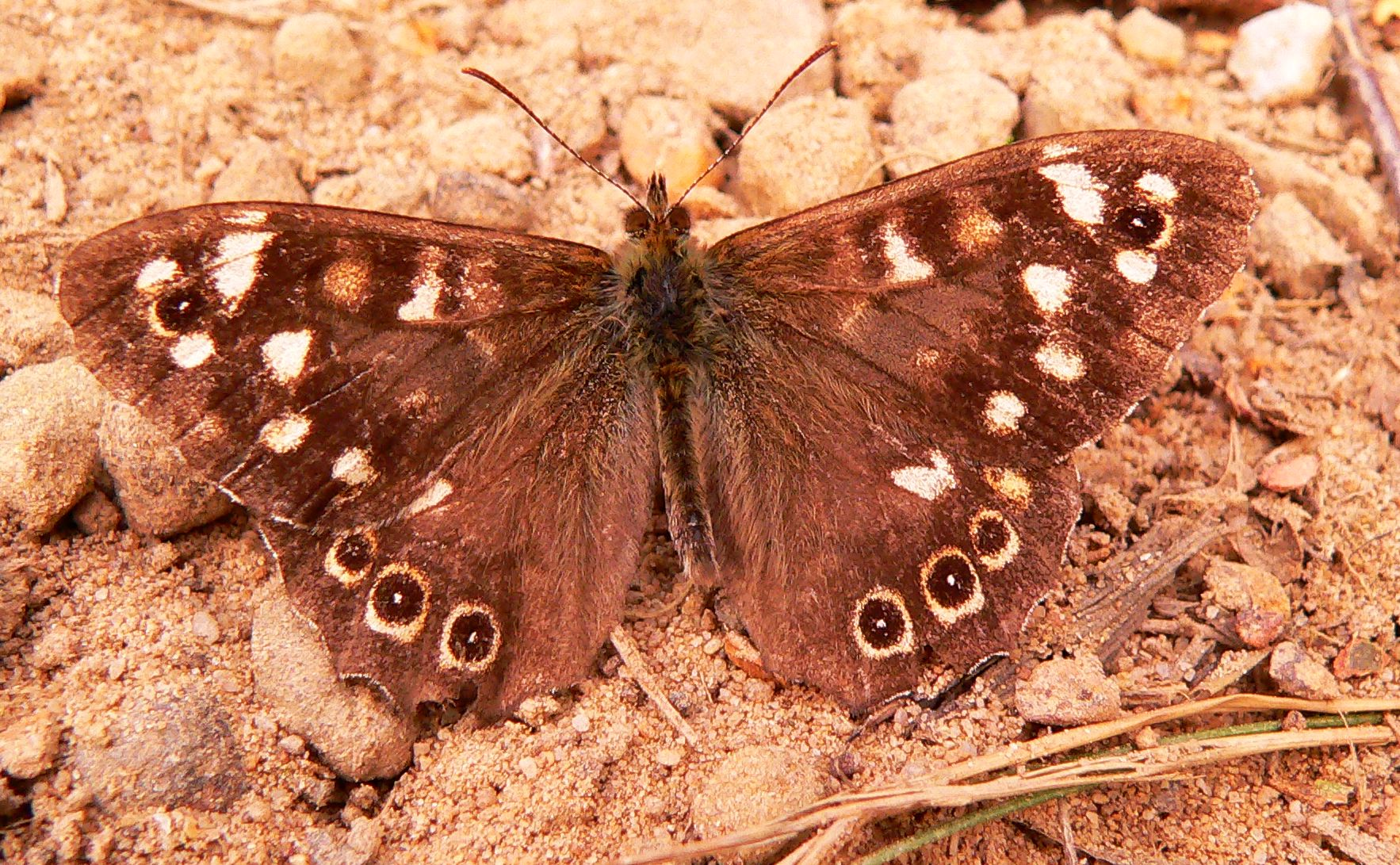
A speckled wood butterfly near Eston Nab
