= Ruth Pennyman =

Ruth Pennyman (born Ruth Constance Dorrien Knight 1893–1983) was an English artist, designer, community organiser and theatrical producer. She was the wife of aristocratic land-owner Major James Pennyman of Ormesby Hall in Middlesbrough.

== Biography ==
Pennyman was the daughter of Rev. Francis Henry Grenville Knight, a rector from Upton-upon-Pyne. She studied at St John's Wood Art School where she learned stage design, interior decoration and illustration. During World War I she became a nurse, and in 1926 she married Major Pennyman. During the inter-war years she developed a keen social conscience and used her prominent position to help communities in need. In 1932 she helped establish the Cleveland Work Camps, a self-help scheme aimed at alleviating the poverty of unemployed iron-stone miners during the Great Depression. In the late 1930s, as chair of the local branch of the National Joint Committee for Spanish Relief, she was instrumental in rescuing a group of Basque refugee children from the Spanish Civil War, travelling to Barcelona and later arranging their accommodation at Hutton Hall in North Yorkshire.

Her enthusiasm for community engagement and her passion for stage production led Pennyman to produce large scale theatrical productions at Ormesby Hall. Shakespeare was a particular favourite and over many years she staged his plays on the lawn at her stately home, creating the costumes, set designs and promotional posters herself. The productions included The Winter's Tale (1933), Romeo & Juliet (1934), Agincourt (From Henry V, 1935), A Midsummer Night's Dream (1953), As You Like It (1954 & 1958), Henry V (1959), The Taming of the Shrew (1960). Antony and Cleopatra (1964).

Pennyman was known to have strong political views and has been described as having 'startlingly left leaning politics and a love for community projects'. Despite describing herself as a Communist, Pennyman was not a member of the Communist Party of Great Britain.

Pennyman was an important influence on some key figures in British arts, particularly composer Sir Michael Tippett to whom she became a 'mother figure', and theatre producer Joan Littlewood whose Theatre Workshop company she hosted at Ormesby Hall in the post-war years.
