= Normanby Hall, Redcar and Cleveland =

Mansion in Normanby, North Yorkshire

Normanby Hall
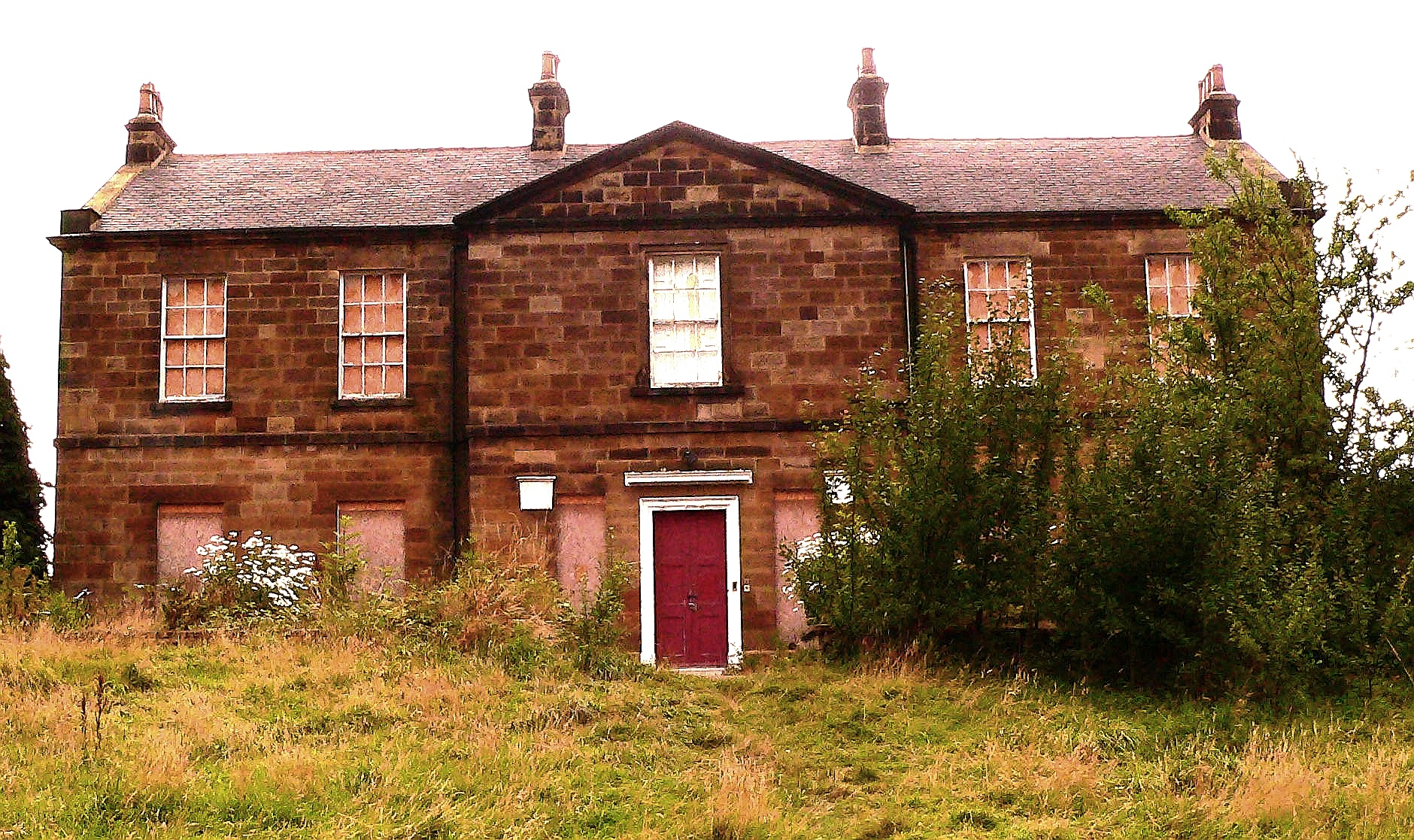
- Interactive map of the Normanby Hall area

General information
- Status: State of disrepair
- Location: England
- Coordinates: 54°33′8″N 1°9′46″W

Normanby Hall is a mansion on the western side of Normanby in Redcar and Cleveland. The manor of Normanby was held at an early period by the de Brus family, of Skelton Castle; and subsequently passed to Marmaduke de Thweng. Later it came into the possession of the Percys, and then, of the Moneys.

At the beginning of the eighteenth century, the estate belonged to William Pennyman, Esq. When he died, in 1718, buried at Eston Church, his daughters Elizabeth and Joanna, married two brothers – Rev. William Consett and Captain Matthew Consett, sons of William Consett of Linthorpe.

The manor lands were split, Reverend William Consett taking the eastern part of the estate, upon which he built the elegant and commodious Normanby House, becoming known as the Manor House. The other brother, Captain Matthew Consett, took the part of the manor with the ancient Hall.

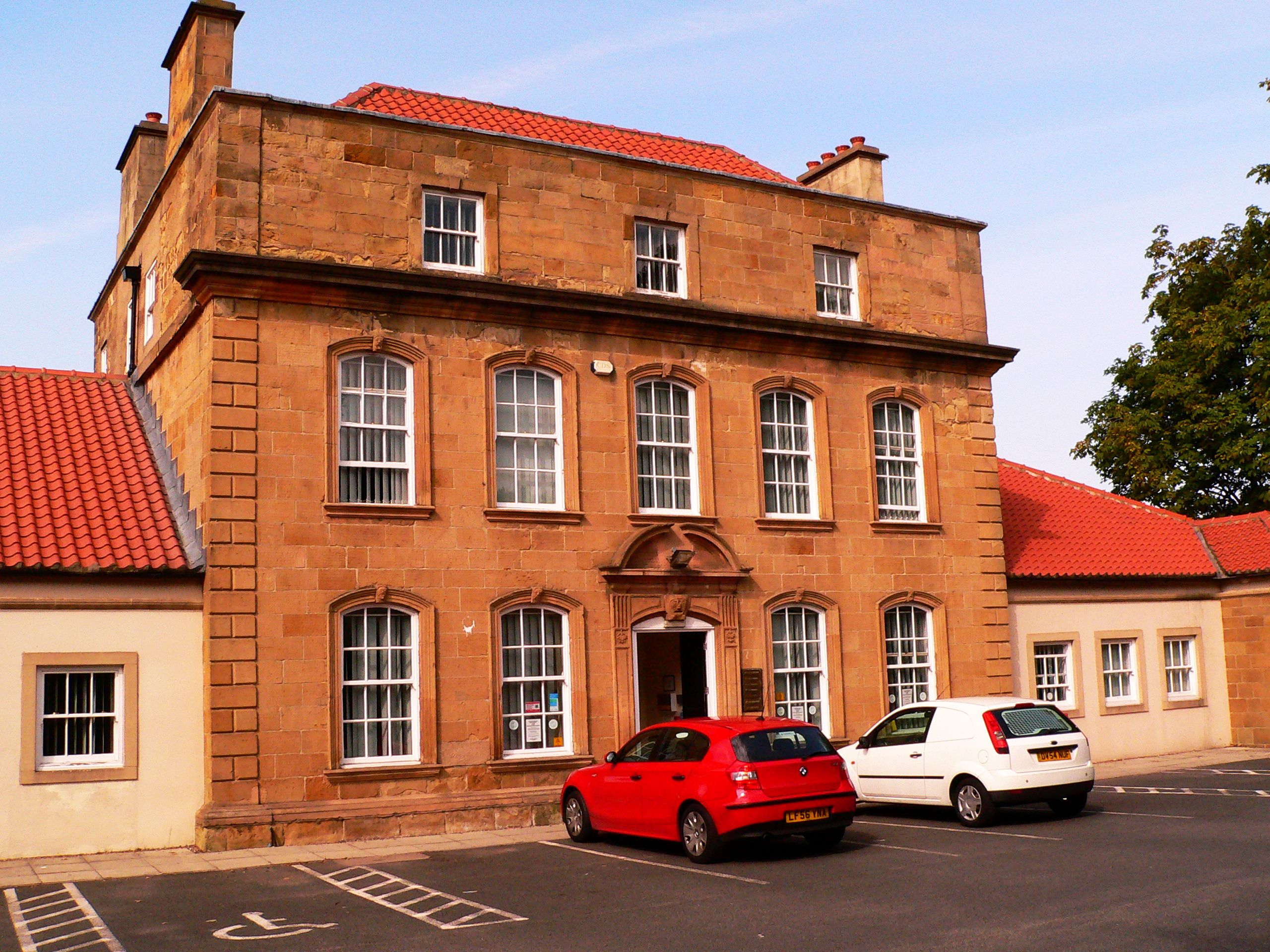
Normanby House is now known as the Manor House and serves as a doctors' surgery.

The Hall with a moiety of the estate was purchased in 1748, by Ralph Jackson, on the death of Captain Consett and in 1790 he common fields around it were enclosed to become parkland for the mansion. It descended through the Jackson family, in the late 1880s, to Major Charles Ward-Jackson M.P., who was lord of the manor, and who died in 1930.

In the twentieth century, it came into the hands of Charles Amer, a former jazzband leader (Charles Amer Orchestra), Middlesbrough F.C. Chairman, owner of the Coatham Hotel, in Redcar, the Marton Hotel and Country Club and, later, property developer. Amer later sold the parkland belonging to the Hall and houses were built. The Hall itself, after several years as a retirement home, is now unoccupied and in a state of disrepair.
