= A Century in Stone =

A Century in Stone – The Eston & California Story
- Directed by: Craig Hornby
- Written by: Craig Hornby
- Produced by: Craig Hornby
- Starring: Paul Chapman, Jason Etherington, Michael Sheard, Wally K. Daly
- Cinematography: Craig Hornby
- Edited by: Craig Hornby
- Music by: Mike Frankland & Craig Hornby
- Production company: Pancrack Pictures
- Distributed by: Pancrack Pictures
- Release date: February 2004
- Running time: 118 minutes
- Country: United Kingdom
- Language: English
- Budget: £103k

A Century in Stone is a 2004 documentary film by Craig Hornby. It tells the story of how the discovery of ironstone at Eston in 1850 sparked the transformation of Teesside from rural backwater to iron-making capital of the world.

Craig Hornby was awarded a prestigious £75,000 NESTA fellowship award to fund the film. Further funding totalling £28,000 came from Northern Arts, Redcar & Cleveland Borough Council, Northern Film & Media, UK Trade & Investment, Teesside University and Middlesbrough Council.

Launched in 2004, "A Century in Stone" attracted thousands to clubs and halls across Teesside before becoming the first local film to be shown at a mainstream cinema chain on Teesside. In its first week at UGC Middlesbrough (now Cineworld), it outsold all the other films leading to an extended run of 18 days.

In November 2004, the film and director were featured at Sheffield DocFest as part of a seminar on independent film-making.

At Xmas 2004, the film became a DVD/VHS bestseller in stores across Teesside. Sales to date exceed 15,000.

In August 2005, the film opened at Dendy Cinemas in Sydney Harbour due to Sydney Harbour Bridge being made with Cleveland ironstone/Teesside Steel by Dorman Long of Middlesbrough in 1932. This was followed with screenings in Brisbane, Melbourne, Fremantle, Adelaide and Newcastle NSW.

In 2010, the film was selected by the British Film Institute for screening at the BFI Mediatheques on London's South Bank and around the UK.

In 2010, audio extracts from the film and interviews on Eston Nab with Craig Hornby were featured in a BBC Radio 4 'Archive on 4' documentary entitled 'Redcar – Made of Steel'. This was produced with Teesside-born actor Felicity Finch in the wake of the first closure of the Redcar Blast Furnace.

On 16th September 2024, the film returned to Cineworld Middlesbrough for a single screening to mark a double anniversary: 75 years since the end of Eston mine and the 20 years since the film was first shown there. An audience of 229 attended and a 'Last Shift' slideshow and Q&A followed with director Craig Hornby.
