= Ormesby Hall =

Grade I listed house in North Yorkshire, England

Coordinates: 54.5432°N 1.1830°W

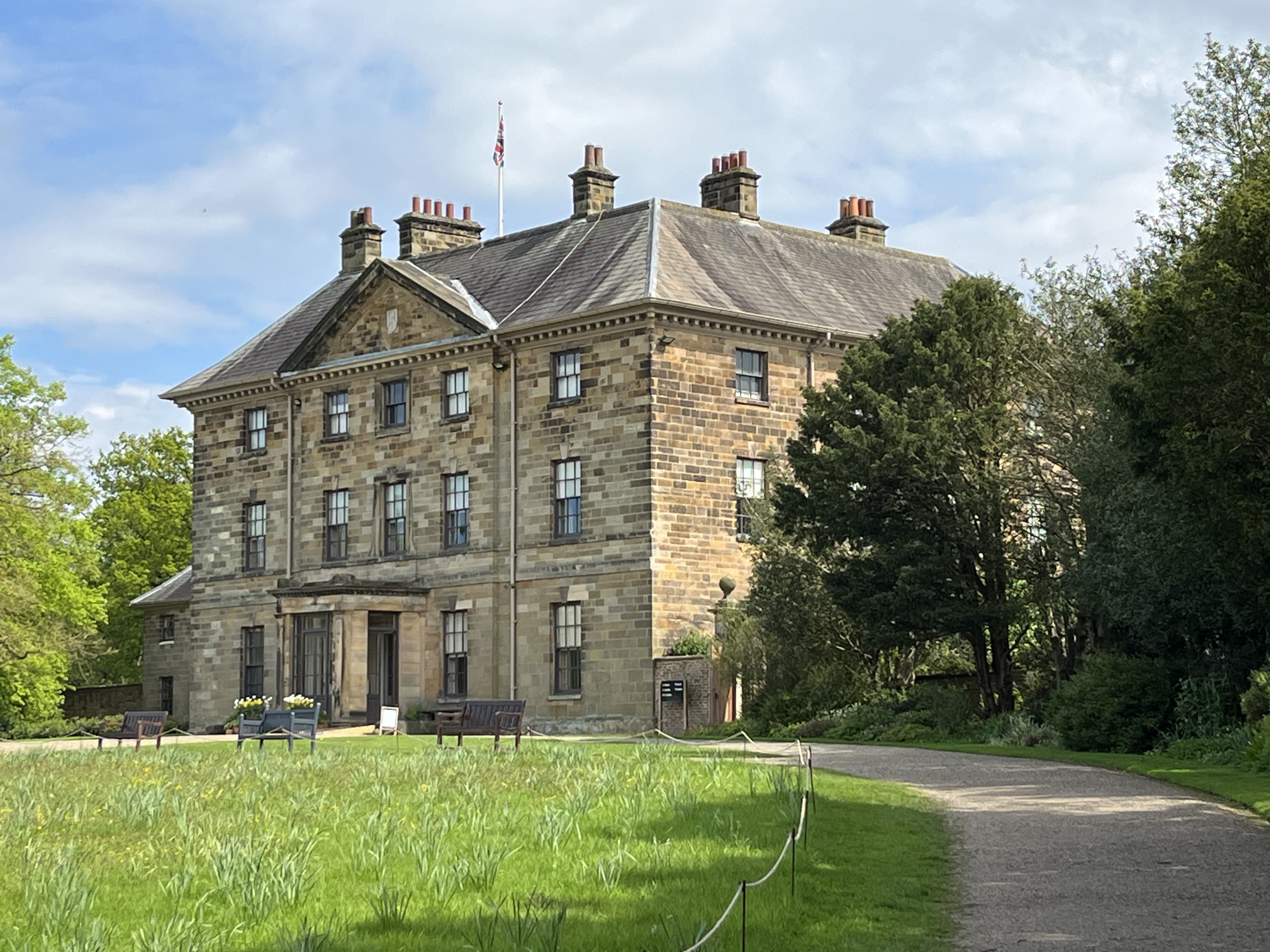
- Interactive map of the Ormesby Hall area

General information
- Location: England
- Completed: 1754
- Owner: National Trust

Ormesby Hall, a Grade I listed building, is a predominantly 18th-century mansion house built in the Palladian style and completed in 1754. It is situated in Ormesby, Middlesbrough, North Yorkshire in the north-east of England.

The home of the Pennyman family, originally dating from c. 1600, the property has been much modernised. Now described as a "classic Georgian mansion", it comprises a main residential block and an adjacent stable block. The stable block housed the horses of Cleveland Police Mounted Section until their disbandment in December 2013.

The Pennyman family began acquiring land in Ormesby in the 16th century and bought the Manor of Ormesby in about 1600 from the Conyers/Strangeways family. They acquired a Baronetcy from Charles II for fighting on the side of the royalists in the English Civil War, which became extinct in 1852 with the death of Sir William Pennyman. They lived in the house until 1983 when the National Trust opened the property and its 270 acres (110 ha) of land to the public after the death of Mrs Ruth Pennyman.

The house contains significant plasterwork, a Victorian kitchen and laundry areas, gardens and estate walks. There is also a model railway which is open to the public.

Ormesby Hall holds a range of events throughout the year.

The historic barn at the estate farm was destroyed by fire in August 2023.
