= Wilfred Franks =

English author and musician

- Born: Wilfred Florestan Franks; 13 January 1908
- Died: 12 May 2003 (aged 95)
- Occupations: Artist, designer, sculptor, dancer, actor
- Notable work: Acis and Galatea (1938) BBC Television, The Insect Play (1939) BBC Television, The Pilgrims Progress (1939) BBC Television
- Relatives: Daphne Rudd (spouse)

Wilfred Florestan Franks (1908–2003) was a British artist, designer, sculptor, dancer and actor. He married Daphne Rudd in 1951.

== Biography ==
Franks trained at the Staatliche Bauhochschule (de) in Weimar, Germany, from 1929 to 1930. He also attended classes at the Bauhaus art school in Dessau, although he was not officially enrolled at the school. On his return to England he worked with a mining community in the village of Boosbeck in the northeast of England, teaching a group of unemployed miners how to design and make furniture.

It was through his involvement with Boosbeck that Franks got to know the composer Michael Tippett. Franks and Tippett were involved in an intense love affair during the 1930s, and Tippett dedicated his String Quartet No.1 to Franks. Tippett remarked: "Meeting with Wilf was the deepest, most shattering experience of falling in love: and I am quite certain that it was a major factor underlying the discovery of my own individual musical 'voice' ... all that love flowed out in the slow movement of my First String Quartet." Franks was an important influence on Tippett both personally and creatively, their shared love of poetry, politics and traditional folk music influenced Tippett's music at this time.

Wilf Franks was an anti-fascist, Marxist political activist who supported Trotskyism and the Fourth International. While living in Germany, he was part of an anti-fascist counter demonstration which failed to stop a Nazi parade in the city of Dessau. On Sunday 4 October 1936, he was arrested (and later sentenced to 28 days hard labour) while helping to block a march by the British Union of Fascists, during the Battle of Cable Street.

In 1936 Franks studied acting at the Royal Academy of Dramatic Arts, and later performed on numerous early BBC Television shows, including The Insect Play (1939) and The Pilgrims Progress (1939). During the second half of the 1930s, he became a dancer with Margaret Barr's Dance Drama Group, performing in productions such as "Miners" (1936) and "Dance of Two With Chorus" (1937) at the Embassy Theatre, London, in 1936.

Due to his political beliefs, Franks refused conscription to the British Army and he was imprisoned as a conscientious objector during World War II.

In the post war years, Franks became a designer at the Ford Motor Company at Dagenham and later a lecturer in design at Leeds Polytechnic.

Franks' design work with the mining community of Boosbeck provided inspiration to the artist Adam Clarke, a graduate of the Royal College of Art. In 2015, Clarke established New Boosbeck Industries, replicating the furniture making project that Franks had initiated in the 1930s. The life and work of Franks also featured in the Twentieth Century Society symposium 'Bye Bye Bauhaus', held at The University of Westminster School of Architecture in 2019.
