= Redcar and Cleveland Borough Council elections =

Local government elections in North Yorkshire, England

Redcar and Cleveland Borough Council is the local authority for the unitary authority of Redcar and Cleveland in North Yorkshire, England. Until 1 April 1996 it was a non-metropolitan district in Cleveland, called Langbaurgh (or Langbaurgh-on-Tees after 1988).

== Political control ==
Since the first election to the council in 1973 political control of the council has been held by the following parties:

Langbaurgh non-metropolitan district

Party in control	Years
No overall control	1973–1976
Conservative	1976–1979
Labour	1979–1987
No overall control	1987–1991
Labour	1991–1996

Redcar and Cleveland unitary authority

Party in control	Years
Labour	1996–2003
No overall control	2003–2011
Labour	2011–2013
No overall control	2013–present

=== Leadership ===
The leaders of the council since 2007 have been:

Councillor	Party	From	To
George Dunning	Labour	17 May 2007	12 Feb 2015
Mary Lanigan	Independent	12 Feb 2015	28 May 2015
Sue Jeffrey	Labour	28 May 2015	23 May 2019
Mary Lanigan	Independent	23 May 2019	25 May 2023
Alec Brown	Labour	25 May 2023	

== Council elections ==
=== Non-metropolitan district elections ===
- 1973 Langbaurgh Borough Council election
- 1976 Langbaurgh Borough Council election (New ward boundaries)
- 1979 Langbaurgh Borough Council election
- 1983 Langbaurgh Borough Council election
- 1987 Langbaurgh Borough Council election
- 1991 Langbaurgh-on-Tees Borough Council election (New ward boundaries)

=== Unitary authority elections ===
- 1995 Redcar and Cleveland Borough Council election
- 1999 Redcar and Cleveland Borough Council election
- 2003 Redcar and Cleveland Borough Council election (New ward boundaries)
- 2007 Redcar and Cleveland Borough Council election
- 2011 Redcar and Cleveland Borough Council election
- 2015 Redcar and Cleveland Borough Council election
- 2019 Redcar and Cleveland Borough Council election (New ward boundaries)
- 2023 Redcar and Cleveland Borough Council election

== Council composition ==
Year	Labour	Liberal Democrats	Conservative	UKIP	East Cleveland Independents (Note: For 2007, this figure includes Loftus Ward Independents and East Cleveland and Guisborough Independents.)	Eston Independents	Teesville Independents	Independent	Council control after election
1995	49	7	1	0	0	0	0	2	Labour
1999	32	11	14	0	0	0	0	2	Labour
2003	23	15	13	0	4	0	0	4	No overall control
2007	28	13	11	0	0	0	3	4	No overall control
2011	32	16	6	0	0	0	3	2	Labour
2015	29	11	10	1	1	1	0	6	No overall control
2019	15	13	11	2	1	0	3	14	No overall control
2023	23	11	12	0	0	0	0	13	No overall control

== Borough result maps ==
2003 results map

2007 results map

2011 results map

2015 results map

2019 results map

2023 results map

== By-election results ==
=== 1995–1999 ===
West Dyke By-Election 25 July 1996
Party	Candidate	Votes	%	±%
Liberal Democrats	Joyce Benbow	771	39.4	
Labour	John Taylor	742	37.9	
Conservative	Jean White	445	22.7	
Majority		29	1.5	
Turnout		1,958	35.0	
Liberal Democrats gain from Labour		Swing		

Eston By-Election 1 May 1997
Party	Candidate	Votes	%	±%
Labour	John Simms	2,168	56.2	−21.5
Independent	Ray Freeman	1,362	35.3	+35.3
Conservative	Yvonne Bennett	329	8.5	+8.5
Majority		806	20.9	
Turnout		3,859		
Labour hold		Swing		

Brotton By-Election 25 September 1997
Party	Candidate	Votes	%	±%
Labour		488	58.2	−15.1
Independent		201	24.0	+24.0
Conservative		150	17.9	−8.8
Majority		287	34.2	
Turnout		839		
Labour hold		Swing		

=== 1999–2003 ===
Teesville By-Election 20 July 2000
Party	Candidate	Votes	%	±%
Labour	Sheelagh Clarke	736	40.5	−22.2
Conservative	David Tabner	537	29.5	+29.5
Liberal Democrats	Vera Butler	509	28.0	−9.3
Socialist Labour	John Taylor	36	2.0	+2.0
Majority		199	11.0	
Turnout		1,818	34.2	
Labour hold		Swing		

Loftus By-Election 7 June 2001
Party	Candidate	Votes	%	±%
Independent	Dave Fitzpatrick	1,918	59.4	+45.3
Labour	Susan McLeod	722	22.4	−40.1
Conservative	Marjorie Veal	333	10.3	−12.6
Liberal Democrats	Val Miller	257	8.0	+8.0
Majority		1,196	37.0	
Turnout		3,230		
Independent gain from Labour		Swing		

Grangetown By-Election 14 March 2002
Party	Candidate	Votes	%	±%
Labour	Peter Dunlop	463	63.3	−9.3
Liberal Democrats	Paul Tuffs	242	33.1	+22.0
Conservative	Lynda Russell	27	3.7	+3.7
Majority		199	30.2	
Turnout		732	16.3	
Labour hold		Swing		

St Germain's By-Election 27 June 2002
Party	Candidate	Votes	%	±%
Liberal Democrats	Bill Goodwell	599	35.8	−13.4
Independent	Mike Findley	587	35.1	+35.1
Labour	Sue McLeod	199	11.9	−23.0
Green	Peter Goodwin	173	10.3	+10.3
Conservative	Neil Bilham	114	6.8	−9.1
Majority		12	0.7	
Turnout		1,672	48.3	
Liberal Democrats gain from Socialist Labour		Swing		

=== 2003–2007 ===
Westworth By-Election 5 May 2005
Party	Candidate	Votes	%	±%
Labour	Denise Bunn	818	34.3	+5.9
East Cleveland Independent	David Williams	805	33.7	+0.3
Conservative	Michael King	626	26.2	−12.0
Independent	Barry Parvin	137	5.7	+5.7
Majority		13	0.6	
Turnout		2,386	67.4	
Labour gain from Independent		Swing		

=== 2007–2011 ===
Guisborough By-Election 11 September 2008
Party	Candidate	Votes	%	±%
Conservative	Bill Clarke	1,124	55.9	+13.5
Labour	Bill Suthers	887	44.1	−0.8
Majority		237	11.8	
Turnout		2,011	34.4	
Conservative hold		Swing		

Kirkleatham By-Election 2 October 2008
Party	Candidate	Votes	%	±%
Liberal Democrats	John Hannon	1,031	56.4	+25.5
Labour	Paul Dixon	486	26.6	−15.9
Conservative	Brian Mundy	204	11.2	−15.5
BNP	Dawn Castle	106	5.8	+5.8
Majority		545	29.8	
Turnout		1,827	36.8	
Liberal Democrats gain from Labour		Swing		

South Bank By-Election 16 October 2008
Party	Candidate	Votes	%	±%
Labour	Marilyn Bramley	652	49.9	−0.6
Liberal Democrats	Toni Meir	288	22.1	+12.3
BNP	Bernard Collinson	206	15.8	+1.4
Independent	Oz Sadiq	101	7.7	−7.3
Conservative	Joan Bolton	59	4.5	−5.8
Majority		364	27.8	
Turnout		1,306	27.6	
Labour hold		Swing		

Dormanstown By-Election 2 April 2009
Party	Candidate	Votes	%	±%
Liberal Democrats	Ken Lucas	809	42.4	+17.3
Labour	Marian Fairley	667	35.0	−17.1
BNP	Lynn Payne	305	16.6	+16.6
Conservative	Brian Hughes-Mundy	125	6.6	−16.2
Majority		142	7.4	
Turnout		1,906	36.8	
Liberal Democrats gain from Labour		Swing		

Dormanstown By-Election 23 July 2009
Party	Candidate	Votes	%	±%
Liberal Democrats	Eric Howden	805	52.3	+27.2
Labour	Richard Green	515	33.5	−18.6
BNP	Lynn Payne	145	9.4	+9.4
Conservative	Joan Bolton	73	4.7	−18.0
Majority		290	18.8	
Turnout		1,538	29.9	
Liberal Democrats gain from Labour		Swing		

South Bank By-Election 17 September 2009
Party	Candidate	Votes	%	±%
Labour	Sue Jeffrey	442	43.6	−6.9
Liberal Democrats	Steven Abbott	354	34.9	+25.1
Independent	Vincent Smith	102	10.1	−5.0
UKIP	Martin Bulmer	69	6.8	+6.8
Conservative	Joan Bolton	47	4.6	−5.7
Majority		88	8.7	
Turnout		1,014	21.2	
Labour hold		Swing		

Ormesby By-Election 3 December 2009
Party	Candidate	Votes	%	±%
Liberal Democrats	Ann Wilson	1,084	73.5	+12.4
Labour	Steve Goldswain	210	14.2	−5.0
UKIP	Martin Bulmer	103	7.0	+7.0
Conservative	Colin Jones	77	5.2	−14.4
Majority		874	59.3	
Turnout		1,474	29.6	
Liberal Democrats hold		Swing		

Brotton By-Election 26 August 2010
Party	Candidate	Votes	%	±%
Labour	Doreen Rudland	565	38.1	−1.0
Independent	Barry Hunt	351	23.7	+10.9
Liberal Democrats	Valerie Miller	315	21.2	−7.8
Conservative	Don Agar	220	14.8	−4.4
BNP	Michael George	33	2.2	+2.2
Majority		214	14.4	
Turnout		1,484	27.8	
Labour hold		Swing		

=== 2011–2015 ===
Zetland (2) By-Election 17 November 2011
Party	Candidate	Votes	%	±%
Liberal Democrats	Ron Harrison	661		
Liberal Democrats	Josh Mason	633		
Labour	Norma Hensby	531		
Labour	Celia Elliott	512		
Conservative	Michael Bateman	217		
Conservative	Brian Hughes-Munday	142		
UKIP	Ian Neil	50		
Turnout		2,746	36.8	
Liberal Democrats hold		Swing		
Liberal Democrats hold		Swing		

Newcomen By-Election 19 January 2012
Party	Candidate	Votes	%	±%
Labour	John P Hannon	539	49.0	
Liberal Democrats	Dave Stones	484	44.0	
Conservative	Matthew Bennett	76	6.9	
Majority		55	5.0	
Turnout		1,099	33.88	
Labour gain from Liberal Democrats		Swing		

Skelton By-Election 8 August 2013
Party	Candidate	Votes	%	±%
Labour	David Walsh	745	46.1	
UKIP	Stuart Todd	485	30.0	
Conservative	Anne Watts	176	10.9	
Independent	James Carrolle	170	10.5	
Liberal Democrats	Rodney Waite	40	2.5	
Majority		260	16.1	
Turnout		1,616	28.3	
Labour hold		Swing		

Dormanstown By-Election 22 May 2014
Party	Candidate	Votes	%	±%
Liberal Democrats	Sabrina Thompson	753	37.3	
Labour	Neil Bendelow	741	36.7	
UKIP	Andrea Turner	523	25.9	
Majority		12	0.6	
Turnout		2,017	38.9	
Liberal Democrats hold		Swing		

=== 2015–2019 ===
Hutton By-Election 17 March 2016
Party	Candidate	Votes	%	±%
Conservative	Caroline Jackson	879	45.0	−8.8
Liberal Democrats	Arthur Kidd	536	27.4	+10.1
Labour	Ian Taylor	368	18.8	−10.1
UKIP	Kenneth Lilleker	116	5.9	n/a
Independent	George Tinsley	56	2.9	n/a
Majority		343	17.6	
Turnout		1,955	33.3	
Conservative hold		Swing		

Ormesby By-Election 18 August 2016
Party	Candidate	Votes	%	±%
Liberal Democrats	Carole Morgan	980	75.4	+37.3
UKIP	Ian Neil	138	10.6	−6.8
Labour	Alison Suthers	126	9.7	−9.4
Conservative	Cameron Brown	41	3.2	−8.4
North East	Philip Lockey	15	1.2	N/A
Majority		842	64.8	
Turnout		1,300	27.5	
Liberal Democrats hold		Swing		

Hutton By-Election 2 March 2017
Party	Candidate	Votes	%	±%
Conservative	Alma Thrower	860	57.4	+3.6
Liberal Democrats	Graeme Kidd	326	21.8	+4.5
Labour	Ian Urwin	183	12.2	−16.7
UKIP	Barry Hudson	129	8.6	n/a
Majority		534	35.6	
Turnout		1,498	25.0	
Conservative hold		Swing		

Newcomen By-Election 2 March 2017
Party	Candidate	Votes	%	±%
Liberal Democrats	Laura Benson	426	44.6	+4.9
Labour	Charlie Brady	259	27.1	−6.7
UKIP	Andrea Turner	153	16.0	−2.4
Independent	Mark Hannon	52	5.4	n/a
Independent	Dave Stones	36	3.8	−4.3
Conservative	Maret Ward	29	3.0	n/a
Majority		167	17.5	
Turnout		955	29.0	
Liberal Democrats hold		Swing		

St Germain's By-Election 5 October 2017
Party	Candidate	Votes	%	±%
Liberal Democrats	Deborah Dowson	661	38.4	+8.6
Labour	David Jones	368	21.4	+1.5
Independent	John Lambert	261	15.2	n/a
Independent	Victor Jeffries	225	13.1	n/a
Conservative	Olwyn Twentyman	174	10.1	−2.6
Green	Nicola Riley	31	1.8	−9.7
Majority		293	17.0	
Turnout		1,720	34.3	
Liberal Democrats hold		Swing		

Longbeck By-Election 15 March 2018
Party	Candidate	Votes	%	±%
Conservative	Vera Rider	494	32.7	+7.1
Liberal Democrats	Marilyn Marshall	397	26.3	+12.3
Labour	Darcie Shepherd	337	22.3	+4.0
Independent	Vic Jeffries	282	18.7	−3.6
Majority		97	6.4	
Turnout		1,510	27.9	
Conservative gain from Independent		Swing		

=== 2019–2023 ===
Guisborough By-Election 6 May 2021
Party	Candidate	Votes	%	±%
Conservative	Andrew Hixon	879	45.1	+21.9
Labour	Lisa Belshaw	406	20.9	−2.1
Independent	Sheila Berry	398	20.4	+20.4
Independent	Fred Page	195	10.0	+10.0
Liberal Democrats	Carolyn Cree	69	3.5	+3.5
Majority		473	24.3	
Turnout		1,947	34.5	
Conservative hold		Swing		

Hutton By-Election 6 May 2021
Party	Candidate	Votes	%	±%
Conservative	Stephen Waterfield	1,318	53.3	+8.3
Liberal Democrats	Jemma Joy	566	22.9	−9.5
Independent	Christopher Baker	332	13.4	+13.4
Labour	Alan Hiscox	256	10.4	−3.0
Majority		752	30.4	
Turnout		2,472	44.9	
Conservative hold		Swing		

Longbeck By-Election 6 May 2021
Party	Candidate	Votes	%	±%
Conservative	Andrea Turner	710	45.0	+12.6
Labour	Luke Myer	440	27.9	+17.8
Independent	Judith Findley	399	25.3	+25.3
Liberal Democrats	Marilyn Marshall	29	1.8	−8.6
Majority		270	17.1	
Turnout		1,578	46.6	
Conservative hold		Swing		

Normanby By-Election 22 December 2022
Party	Candidate	Votes	%	±%
Conservative	Paul Salvin	389	37.5	+15.9
Labour	Leanne Reed	357	34.5	+2.4
Independent	Paul McInnes	109	10.5	+10.5
Independent	Rita Richardson	143	13.8	+13.8
Liberal Democrats	Tracy Jacobs	38	3.7	−12.9
Majority		32	3	
Turnout		1,036	19.2	
Conservative gain from Labour		Swing		

=== 2023–2027 ===
Longbeck By-Election 5 September 2024
Party	Candidate	Votes	%	±%
Conservative	Stephen Crane	384	37.9	
Labour	Jane Bradley	206	20.4	
Independent	Andrea Turner	119	11.8	
Reform	Christopher Gallacher	108	10.7	
Independent	Vic Jeffries	105	10.4	
Independent	Steve Cooper	50	4.9	
Liberal Democrats	Sarah Booth	40	4.0	
Majority		178	17.6	
Turnout		1,012		
Conservative gain from Labour		Swing		

Skelton East By-Election 9 October 2025
Party	Candidate	Votes	%	±%
Reform	Craig Holmes	839	65.3	
Labour	Norman Macleod	247	19.2	
Conservative	Julie Craig	179	13.9	
Liberal Democrats	Stuart Saunders	19	1.5	
Majority		592	46.0	
Turnout		1,284		
Reform gain from Conservative		Swing		

South Bank By-Election 20 November 2025
Party	Candidate	Votes	%	±%
Labour	Susan Jeffrey	368	47.4	
Reform	Adam Jones	344	44.3	
Conservative	Richard Kerr-Morgan	64	8.2	
Majority		24	3.1	
Turnout		776		
Labour hold		Swing		

Zetland By-Election 19 February 2026
Party	Candidate	Votes	%	±%
Liberal Democrats	Alison Barnes	446	50.5	
Labour	Mitchell Rynn	191	21.6	
Reform	Michael Manning	119	13.5	
Green	Brian Teasdale	65	7.4	
Conservative	Igraine Gray	62	7.0	
Majority		255	28.9	
Turnout		883		
Liberal Democrats gain from Labour		Swing		

Reform withdrew support from their candidate during the campaign.
