= 2007 Redcar and Cleveland Borough Council election =

2007 UK local government election

Map of the results of the 2007 Redcar and Cleveland council election. Labour in red, Liberal Democrats in yellow, Conservatives in blue and independents in grey.

The 2007 Redcar and Cleveland Borough Council election took place on 3 May 2007 to elect members of Redcar and Cleveland Unitary Council in England. The whole council was up for election and the council stayed under no overall control.

== Background ==
At the last election in 2003 Labour lost their majority on the council, after winning 23 seats, compared to 15 for the Liberal Democrats, 13 Conservatives and 8 independents. A coalition between the Liberal Democrats, Conservatives and independents then took control of the council.

In 2004 a Labour councillor for Guisborough, and former deputy leader of the party, Keith Pudney, became an independent, before becoming a Liberal Democrat in 2005. However, also in 2005, Labour gained a seat in Westworth from an independent at a by-election. A final change came in February 2007 when David Tomlin resigned from the Labour party after being convicted for falsely claiming benefits. This meant that before the 2007 election Labour had 22 seats, the Liberal Democrats 16, Conservatives 13, East Cleveland Independents 2, the Independent Group 5 and 1 independent, with the Liberal Democrats, Conservatives and the 2 East Cleveland Independents forming the administration, while Labour and the other independents were in opposition.

In total 160 candidates stood for the 59 seats that were being contested at the election. The council already had the best female representation of any council in North East England with 30 women councillors and 75 of the candidates were female. The candidates comprised 50 from Labour, 42 Liberal Democrats, 37 Conservatives, 4 British National Party and 27 various independents. Meanwhile, 7 sitting councillors stood down at the election, Christopher Beadle, Keith Blott, Bill Goodwill, Barbara Harpham, Keith Pudney, Alma Thrower and David Tomlin.

== Election result ==
Labour made a net gain of 6 seats, to go to 28 seats on the council, 2 short of a majority. The gains came at the expense of the Liberal Democrats who dropped 3 to 13 seats and the Conservatives who were down 2 to 11 seats. 7 independents were also elected, 4 in the Independent Group, 1 Loftus Ward Independent, 1 East Cleveland and Guisborough Independent and 1 East Cleveland Independent.

Following the election the Labour group leader, George Dunning, became the new leader of the council, after Labour got the support of 2 independents, Mike Findley and Mary Lanigan.

Redcar and Cleveland local election result 2007
Party	Seats	Gains	Losses	Net gain/loss	Seats %	Votes %	Votes	+/−
Labour	28	7	1	+6	47.5	37.5	34,980	+1.4%
Liberal Democrats	13	0	3	-3	22.0	23.6	22,014	-2.8%
Conservative	11	0	2	-2	18.6	23.7	22,152	-1.9%
Independent	4	0	2	-2	6.8	11.6	10,815	+3.7%
Loftus Ward Independent	1	0	0	0	1.7	1.2	1,137	+1.2%
East Cleveland and Guisborough Independent	1	1	0	+1	1.7	1.1	984	+1.1%
East Cleveland Independent	1	0	0	0	1.7	0.6	559	-3.4%
BNP	0	0	0	0	0	0.8	731	+0.8%

== Ward results ==
Brotton (3)
Party	Candidate	Votes	%	±%
Labour	Brian Hogg	858		
Labour	Richard Rudland	728		
Labour	Peter Scott	647		
Liberal Democrats	Valerie Miller	637		
Liberal Democrats	Kay Walker	581		
Conservative	Andrew Morgan	422		
Liberal Democrats	Norma Morris	405		
Conservative	George Bolton	365		
Independent	Christine Swales	280		
Turnout		4,923	36.1	
Labour hold		Swing		
Labour gain from Liberal Democrats		Swing		
Labour gain from Liberal Democrats		Swing		

Coatham (2)
Party	Candidate	Votes	%	±%
Liberal Democrats	Josie Crawford	415		
Liberal Democrats	Irene Curr	372		
Labour	Theresa Cave	305		
Independent	Edward Dolan	289		
Independent	Jimmy Willis	285		
Labour	Peter Todd	260		
BNP	Paul Harrison	137		
Conservative	David Taylerson	113		
Turnout		2,176	33.8	
Liberal Democrats hold		Swing		
Liberal Democrats hold		Swing		

Dormanstown (3)
Party	Candidate	Votes	%	±%
Labour	Vilma Collins	858		
Labour	Cliff Houlding	805		
Labour	Ray Goddard	758		
Liberal Democrats	Derek Grimshaw	414		
Liberal Democrats	John Curr	412		
Liberal Democrats	Marjorie Paskin	386		
Conservative	Stuart Bell	374		
Turnout		4,007	33.2	
Labour hold		Swing		
Labour hold		Swing		
Labour hold		Swing		

Eston (3)
Party	Candidate	Votes	%	±%
Independent	Ann Higgins	890		
Labour	Olwyn Peters	857		
Independent	Liz Beadle	841		
Labour	John Simms	812		
Independent	Vincent Smith	781		
Labour	Beryl Dunning	780		
BNP	Wayne Burdett	174		
Liberal Democrats	Carol Smith	120		
Conservative	Russell Hutchinson	113		
Liberal Democrats	Colin Crawford	86		
Liberal Democrats	Patricia Todd	67		
Turnout		5,521	37.6	
Independent hold		Swing		
Labour gain from Independent		Swing		
Independent hold		Swing		

Grangetown (2)
Party	Candidate	Votes	%	±%
Labour	Lynn Pallister	557		
Labour	Peter Dunlop	476		
Liberal Democrats	Angela Draper	154		
Liberal Democrats	Arthur Clarke	132		
Turnout		1,319	24.4	
Labour hold		Swing		
Labour hold		Swing		

Guisborough (3)
Party	Candidate	Votes	%	±%
Labour	Denise Bunn	1,058		
Conservative	Anne Franklin	999		
Labour	Joe Keenan	999		
Conservative	Bill Clarke	997		
Labour	Bill Suthers	915		
Conservative	Brian Gent	884		
Liberal Democrats	Judith Carter	299		
Turnout		6,151	38.4	
Labour gain from Conservative		Swing		
Conservative hold		Swing		
Labour gain from Liberal Democrats		Swing		

Hutton (3)
Party	Candidate	Votes	%	±%
Conservative	Graham Jeffery	1,646		
Conservative	Valerie Halton	1,620		
Conservative	Peter Spencer	1,478		
Labour	Shelagh Holyoake	681		
Turnout		5,425	40.8	
Conservative hold		Swing		
Conservative hold		Swing		
Conservative hold		Swing		

Kirkleatham (3)
Party	Candidate	Votes	%	±%
Labour	Norman Davies	698		
Labour	Brenda Forster	691		
Labour	Mark Hannon	660		
Liberal Democrats	Carol Johnson	508		
Liberal Democrats	Alan Langner	503		
Liberal Democrats	Ann Plummer	502		
Conservative	Joy Bishop	438		
Turnout		4,000	33.5	
Labour hold		Swing		
Labour hold		Swing		
Labour hold		Swing		

Lockwood
Party	Candidate	Votes	%	±%
East Cleveland Independent	Stephen Kay	559	63.5	
Labour	Peter Briggs	239	27.1	
Conservative	Joan Bolton	83	9.4	
Majority		320	36.3	
Turnout		881	55.9	
Independent hold		Swing		

Loftus (3)
Party	Candidate	Votes	%	±%
Independent	Mary Lanigan	1,068		
Labour	Eric Jackson	808		
Loftus Ward Independent	David Fitzpatrick	585		
Independent	Linda Bell	547		
Labour	Allan Greening	529		
Labour	Gerry Dickinson	416		
Independent	Wayne Davies	335		
Loftus Ward Independent	Stephanie Aplin-Wakefield	289		
Loftus Ward Independent	Roger Lings	263		
Conservative	Jennifer Bell	186		
Conservative	Mary Dadd	157		
Turnout		4,713	41.4	
Independent hold		Swing		
Labour hold		Swing		
Independent hold		Swing		

Longbeck (3)
Party	Candidate	Votes	%	±%
Independent	Mike Findley	1,143		
Conservative	Norah Cooney	738		
Conservative	Vera Moody	697		
Independent	Norman Brown	495		
Conservative	Vera Rider	486		
Independent	John Wilkinson	427		
Labour	Vic Jeffries	422		
Labour	Denis Sewell	375		
Labour	Susan Cleary	334		
Liberal Democrats	Norman Brown	180		
Liberal Democrats	Victoria Reyer	171		
Liberal Democrats	Patricia Swales	158		
Turnout		5,626	38.2	
Independent hold		Swing		
Conservative hold		Swing		
Conservative hold		Swing		

Newcomen (2)
Party	Candidate	Votes	%	±%
Liberal Democrats	Christopher Abbott	725		
Liberal Democrats	Glynis Abbott	637		
Independent	Chris McGlade	346		
Independent	Rachel Woolley	249		
Labour	Anthony Senior	204		
Conservative	Judith Petite	111		
Turnout		2,272	38.5	
Liberal Democrats hold		Swing		
Liberal Democrats hold		Swing		

Normanby (3)
Party	Candidate	Votes	%	±%
Labour	Billy Ayre	913		
Labour	Wendy Wall	848		
Labour	Carole Simms	825		
Liberal Democrats	Amanda Proud	733		
Liberal Democrats	Ann Wilson	661		
Liberal Democrats	Steven Abbott	658		
Conservative	Paul Jackson	443		
Conservative	Gillian Dadd	389		
Turnout		5,470	37.8	
Labour gain from Independent		Swing		
Labour hold		Swing		
Labour hold		Swing		

Ormesby (3)
Party	Candidate	Votes	%	±%
Liberal Democrats	Glyn Nightingale	1,140		
Liberal Democrats	Eric Empson	1,082		
Liberal Democrats	Irene Nightingale	1,038		
Conservative	Jacqueline Watson	366		
Labour	Marian Fairley	360		
Turnout		3,986	36.8	
Liberal Democrats hold		Swing		
Liberal Democrats hold		Swing		
Liberal Democrats hold		Swing		

Saltburn (3)
Party	Candidate	Votes	%	±%
Conservative	Philip Thomson	1,080		
Conservative	Joan Sands	1,018		
Conservative	John Robinson	947		
Labour	Joan Guy	857		
Labour	Tom Blenkinsop	791		
Labour	Cyril Hammond	724		
Turnout		5,417	41.8	
Conservative hold		Swing		
Conservative hold		Swing		
Conservative hold		Swing		

Skelton (3)
Party	Candidate	Votes	%	±%
Labour	Brian Briggs	1,225		
Labour	Dave McLuckie	1,080		
Labour	Helen McLuckie	1,004		
Conservative	James Carrolle	672		
Conservative	Michael King	667		
Conservative	Stephanie Hinson	642		
Independent	Colin Harbinson	354		
Independent	Debbie Harbinson	342		
BNP	Kevin Broughton	171		
Turnout		6,157	43.0	
Labour hold		Swing		
Labour hold		Swing		
Labour hold		Swing		

South Bank (3)
Party	Candidate	Votes	%	±%
Labour	Ian Jeffrey	874		
Labour	Pearl Hall	852		
Labour	Sylvia Szintai	751		
Independent	Alan Green	260		
BNP	Dawn Castle	249		
Conservative	Dorothy Hutton	179		
Liberal Democrats	Gail Leggett	169		
Liberal Democrats	Richard Ovens	138		
Liberal Democrats	Alexandra Stamp	45		
Turnout		3,517	30.1	
Labour hold		Swing		
Labour hold		Swing		
Labour hold		Swing		

St. Germains (3)
Party	Candidate	Votes	%	±%
Liberal Democrats	Marjorie Moses	1,218		
Liberal Democrats	Margaret Wilson	1,107		
Liberal Democrats	Deborah Dowson	1,088		
Labour	Ray Hensby	546		
Conservative	Joan Moody	541		
Labour	Craig Laskey	503		
Conservative	John Rider	498		
Turnout		5,501	43.4	
Liberal Democrats hold		Swing		
Liberal Democrats hold		Swing		
Liberal Democrats hold		Swing		

Teesville (3)
Party	Candidate	Votes	%	±%
Labour	Sheelagh Clarke	1,269		
Labour	George Dunning	1,157		
Labour	Norman Pickthall	999		
Independent	Jim Higgins	630		
Conservative	Stewart Dadd	402		
Liberal Democrats	Sheila Clarke	287		
Liberal Democrats	Branda Dale	263		
Liberal Democrats	Helen Hadfield	240		
Turnout		5,247	40.3	
Labour hold		Swing		
Labour hold		Swing		
Labour hold		Swing		

West Dyke (3)
Party	Candidate	Votes	%	±%
Liberal Democrats	Joyce Benbow	1,313		
Liberal Democrats	Michael Carling	1,122		
Liberal Democrats	Mary Ovens	1,054		
Independent	Malcolm Burton	744		
Conservative	Andrew Gilbey	520		
Labour	Andrew Scott	435		
Turnout		5,188	37.6	
Liberal Democrats hold		Swing		
Liberal Democrats hold		Swing		
Liberal Democrats hold		Swing		

Westworth (2)
Party	Candidate	Votes	%	±%
East Cleveland and Guisborough Independent	David Williams	544		
Conservative	Carole Jeffery	541		
Conservative	Derrick Langley	528		
East Cleveland and Guisborough Independent	Tressa Cooper	440		
Labour	Jim Marvell	415		
Turnout		2,468	39.4	
Independent gain from Labour		Swing		
Conservative hold		Swing		

Zetland (2)
Party	Candidate	Votes	%	±%
Labour	Norma Hensby	438		
Conservative	Robert Stanway	422		
Liberal Democrats	John Hannon	413		
Conservative	Jean White	390		
Labour	Marilyn Norton	384		
Liberal Democrats	Paul Smith	381		
Independent	Roy Myers	297		
Independent	Hazel Willis	212		
Turnout			42.6	
Labour gain from Conservative		Swing		
Conservative hold		Swing		
