= 2015 Redcar and Cleveland Borough Council election =

Local election in England

← 2011	7 May 2015	2019 →

59 of 59 seats on Redcar and Cleveland Borough Council 29 seats needed for a majority
	First party	Second party	Third party
Party	Labour	Liberal Democrats	Conservatives
Seats before	31	16	6
Seats won	29	11	10
Seat change	▼3	▼5	▲4
Popular vote	59,140	24,336	19,175
	Fourth party	Fifth party	Sixth party
Party	Independent	East Cleveland Independent	Eston Independents
Seats before	2	3	0
Seats won	6	1	1
Seat change	▲4	▼2	▲1
Popular vote	28,867	677	4,860
	Seventh party	Eighth party
Party	UKIP	Green
Seats before	0	0
Seats won	1	0
Seat change	▲1	Steady
Popular vote	8,360	3752
- Map of the results of the 2015 Redcar and Cleveland council election. Labour in red, Liberal Democrats in yellow, Conservatives in blue, Independents in grey, and UKIP in purple.
Council control before election
Labour (2011-2013) then No overall control (2013-15)
Subsequent council control
No overall control

The 2015 Redcar and Cleveland Borough Council election took place on 7 May 2015 to elect members of Redcar and Cleveland Borough Council in England. This was on the same day as other local elections, as well as the 2015 General Election.

Three months prior to the election, Council Leader George Dunning and ten other Labour councillors resigned from the party after many were not selected as Labour candidates for the election. This saw the council move back to no overall control, with independent Mary Lanigan elected to lead the council - the first female Council Leader in its history - and forming a cabinet from Independent and Liberal Democrats councillors.

The election saw the council remain as no overall control.

== Background ==
The 2015 Redcar and Cleveland Borough Council election was held on the same day as other local elections as well as the 2015 General Election.

The Liberal Democrats, who had made gains in the 2011 election, as well as MP Ian Swales in 2010, lost seats in lieu of the Conservatives, UKIP & Multiple independents.

The Labour Party lost several seats, failing to regain the overall control it had between 2011 and 2013.

UKIP gained its first seat on the council as Steve Turner was elected to the borough council. However he would leave the party in 2017, and was elected as Cleveland Police and Crime Commissioner in 2021.

== Election result ==
Redcar and Cleveland local election result 2015
Party	Seats	Gains	Losses	Net gain/loss	Seats %	Votes %	Votes	+/−
Labour	29	6	9	▼3			59140	
Liberal Democrats	11	2	7	▼5			24336	
Conservative	10	4	0	▲4			19175	
Independent	6	2	0	▲4			28867	
East Cleveland Independent	1			▼2			677	
Eston Independents	1	1	0	▲1			4860	
UKIP	1	1	0	▲1			8360	
Green	0	0	0	Steady			3752	

== Ward results ==
=== Brotton ===
Brotton
Party	Candidate	Votes	%	±%
Independent	Barry Hunt	1,501		
Labour	Michael Dick	1,062		
Conservative	Malcom Griffiths	940		
Independent	Brian Hogg	870		
Labour	Geraldine Nuttall	843		
Independent	Kay Walker	827		
Labour	Ian Urwin	820		
Independent	Valerie Miller	640		
Green	Elaine Kirby	610		
Turnout		3,267	62.0	
Independent hold		Swing		
Labour hold		Swing		
Conservative gain from Labour		Swing		

=== Coatham ===
Coatham
Party	Candidate	Votes	%	±%
Labour	Neil Baldwin	827		
Labour	Carl Quartermain	733		
Independent	Josie Crawford	523		
UKIP	Luke McMillan	494		
Independent	Irene Curr	456		
Liberal Democrats	John Wilson	366		
Independent	Anthony Jackson	95		
Turnout		2,124	57.4	
Labour gain from Liberal Democrats		Swing		
Labour gain from Liberal Democrats		Swing		

=== Dormanstown ===
Dormanstown
Party	Candidate	Votes	%	±%
Labour	Ceri Crawley	1,279		
Labour	Ray Goddard	1,271		
Labour	Alec Brown	1,066		
Liberal Democrats	Eric Howden	981		
Liberal Democrats	Sabrina Thompson	957		
Liberal Democrats	Laura Benson	887		
UKIP	Andrea Turner	752		
Green	Michael York	273		
Turnout		2,991	59.4	
Labour gain from Liberal Democrats		Swing		
Labour gain from Liberal Democrats		Swing		
Labour hold		Swing		

=== Eston ===
Eston
Party	Candidate	Votes	%	±%
Labour	Christopher Massey	1,197		
Labour	Geraldine Williams	1,105		
Eston Independent	Ann Higgins	1,087		
Labour	Joe Parker	1,060		
Eston Independent	Vincent Smith	891		
UKIP	Stephen Gidney	736		
Independent	Olwyn Peters	472		
Independent	Steve Goldswain	301		
Conservative	John Matchett	269		
Liberal Democrats	Tracy Jacobs	236		
Independent	Rob Midgley	214		
Turnout		3,077	61.8	
Labour hold		Swing		
Labour hold		Swing		
Eston Independent gain from Labour				

=== Grangetown ===
Grangetown
Party	Candidate	Votes	%	±%
Labour	Lynn Pallister	1,337		
Labour	Jade Stainthorpe	1,169		
Liberal Democrats	Mags Sayer	199		
Turnout		1,552	51.7	
Labour hold		Swing		
Labour hold		Swing		

=== Guisborough ===
Guisborough
Party	Candidate	Votes	%	±%
Independent	Bill Clarke	1,501		
Labour	Shelagh Holyoake	1,371		
Conservative	Dennis Teasdale	1,330		
Labour	David Johnson	1,302		
Conservative	Caroline Jackson	1,297		
Labour	Bill Suthers	1,278		
Turnout		3,571	63.7	
Independent gain from Labour		Swing		
Labour hold		Swing		
Conservative gain from Labour		Swing		

=== Hutton ===
Hutton
Party	Candidate	Votes	%	±%
Conservative	Valerie Halton	1,997		
Conservative	Graham Jeffery	1,963		
Conservative	Peter Spencer	1,792		
Labour	Sam Howarth	1,071		
Labour	Alison Suthers	950		
Labour	Charlotte Suthers	856		
Liberal Democrats	Arthur Kidd	643		
Turnout		4,299	72.2	
Conservative hold		Swing		
Conservative hold		Swing		
Conservative hold		Swing		

=== Kirkleatham ===
Kirkleatham
Party	Candidate	Votes	%	±%
Labour	Brenda Forster	1,412		
Labour	Kevin Firman	1,337		
Labour	Dale Quigley	1,178		
UKIP	Frank Harrison	988		
Liberal Democrats	Ian Jones	816		
Conservative	Jack Hassan	695		
Independent	Mark Hannon	680		
Independent	John Hannon	674		
Green	Billy Barnes	319		
Green	Richard Laverick	293		
Turnout		3,340	61.2	
Labour hold		Swing		
Labour hold		Swing		
Labour hold		Swing		

=== Lockwood ===
Lockwood
Party	Candidate	Votes	%	±%
East Cleveland Independent	Steve Kay	677		
Liberal Democrats	Ellie Lowther	150		
Conservative	Peter Berry	123		
Labour	Jackie Godward	116		
Turnout		1,069	68.8	
East Cleveland Independent hold		Swing		

=== Loftus ===
Loftus
Party	Candidate	Votes	%	±%
Independent	Mary Lanigan	1,438		
Labour	Eric Jackson	910		
Independent	Wayne Davies	909		
Independent	David Fitzpatrick	846		
Independent	Allan Greening	718		
Labour	Andrew Anderson	673		
Labour	James McGill	625		
Independent	Tony Gatehouse	427		
Conservative	Joe Hayek	372		
Turnout		2,939	63.7	
Independent hold		Swing		
Labour hold		Swing		
Independent hold		Swing		

=== Longbeck ===
Longbeck
Party	Candidate	Votes	%	±%
Conservative	Norah Cooney	1,402		
Independent	Mike Findley	1,220		
UKIP	Steve Turner	1,083		
Labour	Sheila Argument	1,003		
Labour	Norma Hensby	860		
Labour	Dave Jones	839		
Independent	Vic Jeffries	803		
Liberal Democrats	Alexandra Carter	764		
Independent	Victoria Reyer	655		
Turnout		3,855	71.6	
Conservative hold		Swing		
Independent gain from Labour		Swing		
UKIP gain from Liberal Democrats		Swing		

=== Newcomen ===
Newcomen
Party	Candidate	Votes	%	±%
Liberal Democrats	Chris Abbott	863		
Labour	Billy Wells	735		
Labour	Alan Wilkinson	264		
Liberal Democrats	Kelly Seaman	621		
UKIP	Mike Lockwood	400		
Independent	Dave Stones	176		
Turnout		1,927	61.5	
Liberal Democrats hold		Swing		
Labour gain from Liberal Democrats		Swing		

=== Normanby ===
Normanby
Party	Candidate	Votes	%	±%
Labour	Billy Ayre	1,578		
Labour	Brian Dennis	1,543		
Labour	Chris Foley-McCormack	1,288		
UKIP	Chris Gallacher	999		
Independent	Barbara Brooks	971		
Independent	Carole Simms	633		
Independent	Ron Day	600		
Liberal Democrats	Steven Abbott	477		
Turnout		3,623	64.1	
Labour hold		Swing		
Labour hold		Swing		
Labour hold		Swing		

=== Ormesby ===
Ormesby
Party	Candidate	Votes	%	±%
Liberal Democrats	Glyn Nightingale	1,358		
Liberal Democrats	Irene Nightingale	1,298		
Liberal Democrats	Ann Wilson	1,083		
Labour	Tom Purvis	681		
UKIP	Ian Neil	621		
Labour	Susan Thomas	616		
Labour	Sylvia Szintai	590		
Conservative	Neil Grainger	413		
Independent	Simon Galloway	180		
Independent	Norman Pickthall	163		
Independent	Valerie Pickthall	151		
Turnout		2,869	61.9	
Liberal Democrats hold		Swing		
Liberal Democrats hold		Swing		
Liberal Democrats hold		Swing		

=== St. Germain's ===
St. Germain's
Party	Candidate	Votes	%	±%
Liberal Democrats	Marjorie Moses	1,293		
Liberal Democrats	Karen King	1,218		
Liberal Democrats	Margaret Wilson	1,125		
Labour	Alan Griffiths	861		
Labour	Jean Jones	842		
Labour	Marilyn Marshall	816		
UKIP	John Robinson	694		
Conservative	Sheila Berry	549		
Green	Tony Dodsworth	500		
Independent	Mike Lockey	432		
Green	Deborah Newman	417		
Independent	Jenny Macgregor	296		
Turnout		3,449	69.6	
Liberal Democrats hold		Swing		
Liberal Democrats gain from Labour		Swing		
Liberal Democrats gain from Labour		Swing		

=== Saltburn ===
Saltburn
Party	Candidate	Votes	%	±%
Independent	Stuart Smith	1,892		
Conservative	Philip Thomson	1,218		
Labour	Craig Hannaway	1,125		
Labour	Joan Guy	652		
UKIP	Harry Lilleker	625		
Labour	Kath Sainsbury	600		
Independent	John Lambert	593		
Independent	Jim Wingham	542		
Independent	Sue Featherstone	498		
Green	Ellen Wilkinson	398		
Green	David Masterman	342		
Liberal Democrats	Stan Martin	184		
Turnout		3,510	71.9	
Independent hold		Swing		
Conservative hold		Swing		
Labour hold		Swing		

=== Skelton ===
Skelton
Party	Candidate	Votes	%	±%
Labour	David Walsh	1,205		
Labour	Helen McLuckie	1,111		
Conservative	Cliff Foggo	1,044		
Labour	Ian Taylor	1,041		
Conservative	Maret Ward	994		
UKIP	Stuart Todd	968		
Independent	Brian Briggs	847		
Independent	Margaret Briggs	602		
Green	Dean Axford	468		
Independent	Ray Cawley	415		
Green	Sean Sleightholm	321		
Turnout		3,748	64.9	
Labour hold		Swing		
Labour hold		Swing		
Conservative gain from Labour		Swing		

=== South Bank ===
South Bank
Party	Candidate	Votes	%	±%
Labour	Neil Bendelow	1,604		
Labour	Ian Jeffrey	1,514		
Labour	Susan Jeffrey	1,486		
Independent	Sandra Smith	637		
Eston Independent	Janet Jeffrey	555		
Liberal Democrats	Jean Hutchinson	378		
Turnout		2,689	57.4	
Labour hold		Swing		
Labour hold		Swing		
Labour hold		Swing		

=== Teesville ===
Teesville
Party	Candidate	Votes	%	±%
Labour	Leanne Reed	1,260		
Labour	Bob Norton	1,195		
Labour	Robert Hodgson	1,119		
Eston Independent	Jim Higgins	1,009		
Eston Independent	David Fisher	967		
Eston Independent	Pat Turner	906		
Independent	Val Maynard	464		
Conservative	Gillian Dadd	428		
Independent	Sheelagh Clarke	394		
Independent	George Dunning	347		
Liberal Democrats	Eileen Chapman	279		
Turnout		3,195	65.0	
Labour hold		Swing		
Labour hold		Swing		
Labour hold		Swing		

=== West Dyke ===
West Dyke
Party	Candidate	Votes	%	±%
Liberal Democrats	Lisa Harding	2,224		
Liberal Democrats	Chris Jones	2,150		
Liberal Democrats	Mary Ovens	2,078		
Labour	Mike Dixon	1,133		
Labour	Charlie Brady	1,060		
Labour	Al Mills	1,038		
Independent	Jane Thirlwall	598		
Turnout		4,010	67.3	
Liberal Democrats hold		Swing		
Liberal Democrats hold		Swing		
Liberal Democrats hold		Swing		

=== Westworth ===
Westworth
Party	Candidate	Votes	%	±%
Conservative	Anne Watts	962		
Conservative	Carole Jeffrey	919		
Independent	Dave Williams	790		
Independent	Nev Brown	726		
Labour	Denise Bunn	674		
Labour	Carol Pollock	557		
Turnout		2,563	72.9	
Conservative hold		Swing		
Conservative gain from Labour		Swing		

=== Zetland ===
Zetland
Party	Candidate	Votes	%	±%
Liberal Democrats	Josh Mason	1,081		
Labour	Neil O'Brien	794		
Liberal Democrats	Dot Ives	777		
Labour	John McCormack	623		
Conservative	Michael Bateman	420		
Green	Adam Dolman	228		
Turnout		2,392	68.4	
Liberal Democrats hold		Swing		
Labour gain from Liberal Democrats		Swing		
