= 2019 Redcar and Cleveland Borough Council election =

2019 local election in Redcar & Cleveland

← 2015	2 May 2019	2023 →

59 of 59 seats on Redcar and Cleveland Borough Council 29 seats needed for a majority
	First party	Second party	Third party
Party	Independent	Labour	Liberal Democrats
Seats won	14	14	13
Seat change	▲8	▼15	▲2
Popular vote	14,986	23,425	16,144
	Fourth party	Fifth party	Sixth party
Party	Conservative	UKIP	Teesville Independents
Seats won	11	2	3
Seat change	▲1	▲1	▲3
Popular vote	17,150	3,367	2,131
	Seventh party	Eighth party
Party	East Cleveland Independent	Green
Seats won	1	0
Seat change	Steady	Steady
Popular vote	641	377
- Winner of each seat at the 2019 Redcar and Cleveland Borough Council election
Leader before election
Sue Jeffrey
Labour
No overall control
Subsequent council control
Mary Lanigan
Independent
No overall control

The 2019 Redcar and Cleveland Borough Council election took place on 2 May 2019 to elect members of Redcar and Cleveland Borough Council in England. This was on the same day as other local elections.

The council was under no overall control prior to the election, being run by a Labour minority administration. Following the election the council remained under no overall control, but a coalition of the Liberal Democrats and independent councillors formed to take control, with independent councillor Mary Lanigan being appointed the new leader of the council.

== Result summary ==
2019 Redcar & Cleveland Borough Council election
Party	Seats	Gains	Losses	Net gain/loss	Seats %	Votes %	Votes	+/−
Labour	15	–	–	▼15	24.1	29.9	23,425	
Independent	14	–	–	▲8	24.1	19.1	14,986	
Liberal Democrats	13	–	–	▲2	22.4	20.6	16,144	
Conservative	11	–	–	▲1	19.0	21.9	17,150	
Teesville Independents	3	–	–	▲3	5.2	2.7	2,131	
UKIP	2	–	–	▲1	3.4	4.3	3,367	
East Cleveland Independent	1	–	–	Steady	1.7	0.8	641	
Green	0	–	–	Steady	0.0	0.5	377	

== Ward results ==
=== Belmont ===
Belmont
Party	Candidate	Votes	%	±%
Independent	Peter Berry	698	50.4	
Independent	Anne Watts	537	38.8	
Conservative	Andrew Hixon	470	33.9	
Conservative	Stephen Waterfield	443	32.0	
Labour	Carol Pollock	225	16.2	
Labour	Michaela Rogers	215	15.5	
Turnout		1,385	37.9	
Independent win (new seat)				
Independent win (new seat)				

=== Brotton ===
Brotton
Party	Candidate	Votes	%	±%
Independent	Barry Hunt	1,122	52.7	
Independent	Graham Cutler	1,120	52.6	
Independent	Martin Fletcher	800	37.6	
Conservative	Timothy Dobson	693	32.6	
Labour	Linda White	507	23.8	
Labour	Paula Bednarz-Withers	441	20.7	
Conservative	Lee Holmes	430	20.2	
Labour	Gillian Gilmour	376	17.7	
Conservative	Eugenie Noonan	205	9.6	
Liberal Democrats	Valerie Miller	101	4.7	
Turnout		2,128	41.0	
Independent hold		Swing		
Independent gain from Labour		Swing		
Independent gain from Conservative		Swing		

=== Coatham ===
Coatham
Party	Candidate	Votes	%	±%
Independent	Neil Baldwin	565	52.3	
Labour	Carl Quartermain	376	34.8	
Labour	Rebecca McCabe	343	31.7	
Liberal Democrats	Josephine Crawford	239	22.1	
Liberal Democrats	William Wilson	165	15.3	
Conservative	Alma Thrower	160	14.8	
Turnout		1,081	30.4	
Independent gain from Labour		Swing		
Labour hold		Swing		

=== Dormanstown ===
Dormanstown
Party	Candidate	Votes	%	±%
Labour	Ceri Cawley	394	45.3	
Labour	Alec Brown	383	44.1	
UKIP	Robert Dunn	316	36.4	
Liberal Democrats	Evelyn Hall	189	21.7	
Conservative	Chelsea Hixon	126	14.5	
Turnout		869	25.1	
Labour hold		Swing		
Labour hold		Swing		

=== Eston ===
Eston
Party	Candidate	Votes	%	±%
Labour	Daniel Rees	715	51.3	
Labour	Christopher Massey	669	48.0	
Labour	Geraldine Williams	633	45.4	
Liberal Democrats	Ian Hart	431	30.9	
Conservative	Richard Gibson	375	26.9	
Turnout		1,394	24.7	
Labour hold		Swing		
Labour hold		Swing		
Labour gain from Eston Independent		Swing		

=== Grangetown ===
Grangetown
Party	Candidate	Votes	%	±%
Labour	Lynn Pallister	377	43.7	
Independent	Adam Brook	368	42.6	
Labour	Leanne Reed	354	41.0	
UKIP	Benjamin Hunter-Grayson	299	34.6	
Conservative	Charles Over	82	9.5	
Turnout		863	22.5	
Labour hold		Swing		
Independent gain from Labour		Swing		

=== Guisborough ===
Guisborough
Party	Candidate	Votes	%	±%
Independent	William Clarke	1,066	55.3	
Conservative	Dennis Teasdale	607	31.5	
Labour	Shelagh Holyoake	602	31.2	
Labour	Luke Butterfield	586	30.4	
Labour	Ian Taylor	517	26.8	
Conservative	Anthea Over	474	24.6	
Conservative	John Hatcliffe	468	24.3	
UKIP	Kathleen Latchford	349	18.1	
Turnout		1,927	34.4	
Independent hold		Swing		
Conservative hold		Swing		
Labour hold		Swing		

=== Hutton ===
Hutton
Party	Candidate	Votes	%	±%
Conservative	Graham Jeffery	1,014	46.7	
Conservative	Caroline Jackson	990	45.6	
Conservative	Malcolm Griffiths	848	39.1	
Liberal Democrats	Jemma Joy	730	33.6	
Liberal Democrats	David Curd	660	30.4	
Liberal Democrats	Arthur Kidd	621	28.6	
Labour	Lisa Belshaw	301	13.9	
Labour	Adrian Robson	260	12.0	
Labour	Alan Hiscox	249	11.5	
UKIP	Ian Hudson	207	9.5	
UKIP	James Hudson	189	8.7	
Turnout		2,171	41.6	
Conservative hold		Swing		
Conservative hold		Swing		
Conservative hold		Swing		

=== Kirkleatham ===
Kirkleatham
Party	Candidate	Votes	%	±%
UKIP	Michael Lockwood	672	47.2	
Labour Co-op	Leah Quartermain	588	41.3	
Labour Co-op	Charles Brady	550	38.6	
Labour Co-op	Simon Meech	503	35.3	
Liberal Democrats	Philip Chisholm	471	33.1	
Turnout		1,425	25.9	
UKIP gain from Labour		Swing		
Labour Co-op hold		Swing		
Labour Co-op hold		Swing		

=== Lockwood ===
Lockwood
Party	Candidate	Votes	%	±%
East Cleveland Independent	Stephen Kay	641	85.4	
Labour	Geraldine Nuttal	72	9.6	
Conservative	Samuel Bright	38	5.1	
Majority				
Turnout		757	40.7	
East Cleveland Independent hold		Swing		

=== Loftus ===
Loftus
Party	Candidate	Votes	%	±%
Independent	Wayne Davies	1,126	63.3	
Independent	Mary Lanigan	1,054	59.2	
Independent	Timothy Gray	962	54.0	
Conservative	Anthony Gatehouse	467	26.2	
Conservative	Iain Graham	322	18.1	
Conservative	Janet Dadd	310	17.4	
Labour	Denise Bunn	200	11.2	
Labour	Kate Mann	194	10.9	
Labour	James Bunn	192	10.8	
Turnout		1,780	37.9	
Independent hold		Swing		
Independent hold		Swing		
Independent gain from Labour		Swing		

=== Longbeck ===
Longbeck
Party	Candidate	Votes	%	±%
Conservative	Vera Rider	507	40.4	
Conservative	Norah Cooney	475	37.8	
Independent	Victor Jefferies	469	37.4	
UKIP	Stephen Cooper	269	21.4	
Liberal Democrats	Annette Duff	163	13.0	
Labour	Liam Booth	158	12.6	
Labour	Abdul Rauf	135	10.8	
Liberal Democrats	Marilyn Marshall	105	8.4	
Turnout		1,255	36.2	
Conservative hold		Swing		
Conservative gain from Independent		Swing		

=== Newcomen ===
Newcomen
Party	Candidate	Votes	%	±%
Independent	Edward Wells	439	38.4	
Labour	Carrie Cook	337	29.5	
Independent	David Stones	291	25.4	
Labour	Ian Urwin	271	23.7	
Liberal Democrats	John Hannon	259	22.6	
Liberal Democrats	Sabrina Thompson	253	22.1	
UKIP	Lisa Williams	193	16.9	
Conservative	Linda King	79	6.9	
Turnout		1,144	29.9	
Independent gain from Liberal Democrats		Swing		
Labour hold		Swing		

=== Normanby ===
Normanby
Party	Candidate	Votes	%	±%
Labour	Christine Foley-McCormack	736	44.0	
UKIP	Christopher Gallacher	684	40.9	
Labour	Arthur Ayre	664	39.7	
Labour	Michael Dick	654	39.1	
Conservative	June Hatcliffe	497	29.7	
Liberal Democrats	Stuart Saunders	380	22.7	
Turnout		1,673	30.9	
Labour hold		Swing		
UKIP gain from Labour		Swing		
Labour hold		Swing		

=== Ormesby ===
Ormesby
Party	Candidate	Votes	%	±%
Liberal Democrats	Glyn Nightingale	1,124	73.5	
Liberal Democrats	Carole Morgan	1,123	73.4	
Liberal Democrats	Irene Nightingale	1,094	71.6	
Labour	Robert Hodgson	235	15.4	
Labour	Alexander Brooke	196	12.8	
Labour	Jade Stainthorpe	177	11.6	
Conservative	Margery Teasdale	163	10.7	
Turnout		1,529	31.7	
Liberal Democrats hold		Swing		
Liberal Democrats hold		Swing		
Liberal Democrats hold		Swing		

=== Saltburn ===
Saltburn
Party	Candidate	Votes	%	±%
Independent	Stuart Smith	1,796	71.2	
Conservative	Philip Thompson	1,071	42.5	
Labour	Craig Hannaway	780	30.9	
Conservative	Jacob Young	742	29.4	
Labour	Katherine Sainsbury	641	25.4	
Labour	Drisc Wardle	563	22.3	
Green	Tabitha McLaughlin	377	15.0	
Conservative	Steve Noonan	267	10.6	
Liberal Democrats	Jonathon Thompson	166	6.6	
Turnout		2,521	51.6	
Independent hold		Swing		
Conservative hold		Swing		
Labour hold		Swing		

=== Skelton East ===
Skelton East
Party	Candidate	Votes	%	±%
Conservative	Clifford Foggo	537	44.3	
Conservative	Julie Craig	512	42.3	
Independent	Jeffrey Johnson	372	30.7	
Labour	Darcie Shepherd	291	24.0	
Labour	David Walsh	279	23.0	
UKIP	David Barker	189	15.6	
Turnout		1,211	35.4	
Conservative win (new seat)				
Conservative win (new seat)				

=== Skelton West ===
Skelton West
Party	Candidate	Votes	%	±%
Conservative	Craig Holmes	607	51.6	
Conservative	Lee Holmes	525	44.6	
Labour	Ursula Earl	423	36.0	
Labour	John Pratt	356	30.3	
Independent	David Williams	184	15.6	
Liberal Democrats	Emily Bell	87	7.4	
Turnout		1,176	35.8	
Conservative win (new seat)				
Conservative win (new seat)				

=== South Bank ===
South Bank
Party	Candidate	Votes	%	±%
Independent	Sandra Smith	445	46.7	
Labour	Susan Jeffrey	389	40.9	
Labour	Ian Jeffrey	374	39.3	
Independent	Janet Jeffrey	276	29.0	
Conservative	Darren Poole	67	7.0	
Conservative	Joanne Poole	65	6.8	
Turnout		952	27.8	
Independent gain from Labour		Swing		
Labour hold		Swing		

=== St. Germain's ===
St. Germain's
Party	Candidate	Votes	%	±%
Liberal Democrats	Karen King	1,031	49.4	
Liberal Democrats	Deborah Dowson	935	44.8	
Liberal Democrats	Margaret Wilson	878	42.1	
Independent	Helena Archer	741	35.5	
Conservative	Olwyn Twentyman	404	19.4	
Labour	Brian Dennis	337	16.1	
Labour	Daniel Johns	333	16.0	
Labour	John Lawrenson	330	15.8	
Conservative	Jordan Turner	288	13.8	
Conservative	Kieran Janicki	255	12.2	
Turnout		2,087	37.2	
Liberal Democrats hold		Swing		
Liberal Democrats hold		Swing		
Liberal Democrats hold		Swing		

=== Teesville ===
Teesville
Party	Candidate	Votes	%	±%
Teesville Independent	David Fisher	738	44.1	
Teesville Independent	Robert Clark	723	43.2	
Teesville Independent	Vincent Smith	670	40.0	
Labour	Neil Bendelow	627	37.5	
Labour	Paul Garland	570	34.1	
Labour	Norma Hensby	516	30.8	
Independent	Rita Richardson	298	17.8	
Independent	Adam Mead	257	15.4	
Conservative	John Rider	156	9.3	
Turnout		1,674	33.4	
Teesville Independent gain from Labour		Swing		
Teesville Independent gain from Labour		Swing		
Teesville Independent gain from Labour		Swing		

=== West Dyke ===
West Dyke
Party	Candidate	Votes	%	±%
Liberal Democrats	Mary Ovens	978	55.7	
Liberal Democrats	Christopher Jones	946	53.9	
Liberal Democrats	Malcolm Head	944	53.8	
Labour	Michael Dixon	379	21.6	
Labour	Alan Wilkinson	360	20.5	
Labour	Alison Suthers	350	19.9	
Conservative	Claire Cargill	264	15.0	
Conservative	Stephen Cargill	254	14.5	
For Britain	Pamela Preedy	231	13.2	
Turnout		1,756	35.7	
Liberal Democrats hold		Swing		
Liberal Democrats hold		Swing		
Liberal Democrats hold		Swing		

=== Wheatlands ===
Wheatlands
Party	Candidate	Votes	%	±%
Liberal Democrats	Yvonne Lax-Keeler	404	40.3	
Liberal Democrats	Shaun Moody	390	38.9	
Conservative	Stephen Turner	354	35.3	
Conservative	Andrea Turner	345	34.4	
Labour	Lee Hunter	217	21.7	
Labour	David Wimble	212	21.2	
Turnout		1,002	26.8	
Liberal Democrats win (new seat)				
Liberal Democrats win (new seat)				

=== Zetland ===
Zetland
Party	Candidate	Votes	%	±%
Liberal Democrats	Louise Westbury	650	53.8	
Liberal Democrats	Alison Barnes	627	51.9	
Labour	Cornelius O'Brien	371	30.7	
Labour	Brenda Foster	342	28.3	
Conservative	Michael Bateman	194	16.1	
Turnout		1,208	34.9	
Liberal Democrats hold		Swing		
Liberal Democrats gain from Labour		Swing		

== Changes 2019–2023 ==
Local party the Teesville Independents was de-registered with the Electoral Commission in June 2019; its councillors thereafter sat as independents.

The two UKIP councillors, Mike Lockwood and Christopher Gallacher, both left the party in October 2020 to sit as independents.

Six Conservatives left the party in early 2021 to sit as independents, forming the "Cleveland Independent Group". They were Cliff Foggo, Julie Craig, Graham Jeffrey, Vera Rider, Philip Thompson, and Malcolm Griffiths (the latter had been suspended from the party since November 2019). In December 2021 Graham Jeffrey left the Cleveland Independent Group to join the Liberal Democrats, and Cliff Foggo, Julie Craig, and Vera Rider left the group to join the Independent Group, leaving just Philip Thompson and Malcolm Griffiths in the Cleveland Independent Group. Julie Craig subsequently left the Independent Group in March 2022 and served the remainder of her term as an ungrouped independent.

Craig Hannaway, elected for Labour, left the party in March 2021 to sit as an independent.

Longbeck by-election 6 May 2021 won by Conservative candidate Andrea Turner, following death of Conservative councillor Norah Cooney.

Guisborough by-election 6 May 2021 won by Conservative candidate Andrew Hixon, following death of Conservative councillor Dennis Teasdale.

Hutton by-election 6 May 2021 won by Conservative candidate Stephen Waterfield, following resignation of Conservative councillor Caroline Jackson.

Adam Brook, elected as an independent, joined Labour in July 2022.

Normanby by-election 22 December 2022 won by Conservative candidate Paul Salvin, following death of Labour councillor Chris Foley-McCormack.

Robert Clark, elected as a Teesville Independent, joined Labour in January 2023.

== The Independent Group ==
The independent councillors who formed part of the council's administration with the Liberal Democrats sat together as "The Independent Group". This was a group for the purposes of the Local Government (Committees and Political Groups) Regulations 1990 (and therefore used to determine entitlement to seats on committees) but was not a formal political party registered with the Electoral Commission. Some members of the group did register a new political party in December 2021, called "Redcar and Cleveland Independent", but the party was de-registered less than a year later without ever having contested an election. Those members of the Independent Group who stood for re-election at the subsequent 2023 election did so as independent candidates.
