= 1987 Langbaurgh Borough Council election =

1987 UK local government election

Elections to Langbaurgh Borough Council took place in 1987. The whole council was up for election. The Labour Party won the most seats but there was no overall control of the council.

== Election result ==
Langbaurgh Borough Council local election result 1987
Party	Seats	Gains	Losses	Net gain/loss	Seats %	Votes %	Votes	+/−
Labour	27			-4	45.7	37.7	48,514	-2,802
Conservative	24			-5	40.7	33.7	43,318	-2,439
Alliance	7			+7	11.9	24.9	32,110	+18,472
Independent	2			+2	3.4	3.6	4,647	-2,097
Green	0				0.0	0.1	130	+130

== Ward results ==
=== Bankside ===
Bankside
Party	Candidate	Votes	%	±%
Independent	K Cook	610	36.3%	+12.2%
Independent	J Readman	492		
Labour	R Haining	482	28.7%	−23.1%
Labour	C Christie	387		
Alliance	D Robinson	351	20.9%	−3.2%
Alliance	M Paskin	348		
Conservative	Y Gwenlan	236	14.1%	+14.1%

=== Belmont ===
Belmont
Party	Candidate	Votes	%	±%
Conservative	B Lythgoe	1,331	42.9%	−2.5%
Conservative	P Hopwood	1,305		
Alliance	P Bosworth	1,180	38.1%	+4.9%
Alliance	S Kidd	981		
Labour	J Catron	581	19%	−2.3%
Labour	B Punshon	574		

=== Brotton ===
Brotton
Party	Candidate	Votes	%	±%
Conservative	M Smith	676	30.5%	−4.2%
Alliance	C Watts	651	29.4%	+29.4%
Labour	T Beswick	626	28.3%	−7.6%
Labour	A Cook	545		
Conservative	G Brown	513		
Alliance	E Pinkney	440		
Independent	V Miller	261	11.8%	−17.6%

=== Church Lane ===
Church Lane
Party	Candidate	Votes	%	±%
Labour	W Herlingshaw	949	84%	−3.3%
Labour	W Martin	944		
Alliance	S Wilson	108	9.6%	−3.1%
Alliance	P Cockroft	105		
Conservative	R Binns	73	6.5%	+6.5%

=== Coatham ===
Coatham
Party	Candidate	Votes	%	±%
Conservative	R Hall	555	41.2%	−2.9%
Conservative	W Wright	474		
Alliance	S Davison	432	32.1%	+18.6%
Alliance	D Best	430		
Labour	L Stenson	360	26.7%	+5.5%
Labour	C Hall	350		

=== Dormanstown ===
Dormanstown
Party	Candidate	Votes	%	±%
Labour	T Collins	1,508	50.6%	−12.2%
Labour	A Taylor	1,450		
Labour	M Pearson	1,418		
Conservative	K Thompson	865	29%	+8.6%
Alliance	G Abbott	607	20.4%	+3.6%
Alliance	Ian Swales	562		
Alliance	J Todd	540		

=== Eston ===
Eston
Party	Candidate	Votes	%	±%
Labour	I Cole	1,231	61.1%	−7.6%
Labour	R Cooney	1,141		
Labour	A Harvison	1,051		
Alliance	R Harrison	458	22.7%	−8.6%
Alliance	P Todd	330		
Alliance	A Pierre	328		
Conservative	C Haith	325	16.1%	+16.1%

=== Grangetown ===
Grangetown
Party	Candidate	Votes	%	±%
Labour	S Tombe	688	64.4%	−4.5%
Labour	J Walsh	683		
Alliance	T Phoenix	327	30.6%	+17.5%
Alliance	S Heanan	312		
Conservative		54	5.1%	+5.1%

=== Guisborough ===
Guisborough
Party	Candidate	Votes	%	±%
Conservative	W Richardson	1,016	31.9%	−23.7%
Labour	K Drew	992	31.2%	−13.2%
Conservative	M Hopwood	948		
Labour	R Lewis	899		
Conservative	D Davies	843		
Labour	G Smith	759		
Independent	J Clarke	621	19.5%	+19.5%
Alliance	L Wilkinson	552	17.4%	+17.4%
Alliance	A Carter	476		
Alliance	C Medlock	357		

=== Hutton ===
Hutton
Party	Candidate	Votes	%	±%
Conservative	B Bradley	979	61.4%	−9.8%
Alliance	A Brocklebank	489	30.7%	+10.1%
Labour	H Tout	126	7.9%	−0.3%

=== Kirkleatham ===
Kirkleatham
Party	Candidate	Votes	%	±%
Labour	R Roberts	1,161	37.9%	−2%
Labour	K Nilan	1,144		
Labour	N Davies	1,122		
Conservative	A Wordsworth	981	32%	−1%
Conservative	K Kime	964		
Conservative	R Puffrey	937		
Alliance	T Wilson	590	19.3%	+5.2%
Alliance	J Angus	542		
Alliance	J Matthewman	525		
Independent	P Brown	329	10.7%	−2.3%

=== Lockwood ===
Lockwood
Party	Candidate	Votes	%	±%
Labour	S Kay	1,119	62.5%	−5%
Labour	N Loughran	957		
Conservative	S Winspear	571	31.9%	+0.4%
Conservative	M Wood	524		
Alliance	P Wilson	99	5.5%	+5.5%
Alliance	N Richardson	94		

=== Loftus ===
Loftus
Party	Candidate	Votes	%	±%
Labour	B Scott	1,430	48.1%	−0.5%
Labour	N Lantsberry	1,368		
Labour	A Mason	1,066		
Conservative	V Haynes	1,020	34.3%	+6.3%
Conservative	T Barry	954		
Conservative	R Wilson	855		
Alliance	A Shepherd	523	17.6%	−5.8%
Alliance	N Harrison	259		
Alliance	R Harrison	231		

=== Longbeck ===
Longbeck
Party	Candidate	Votes	%	±%
Conservative	P Gains-Burril	1,520	46.1%	−2.4%
Conservative	V Moody	1,486		
Conservative	L Russell	1,460		
Labour	P Harford	1,085	32.9%	+2.4%
Labour	J Fitzgerald	1,064		
Labour	A Taylor	997		
Alliance	N Herrell	692	21%	−
Alliance	J Terry	566		
Alliance	T Wilkinson	514		

=== Newcomen ===
Newcomen
Party	Candidate	Votes	%	±%
Alliance	C Abbott	1,528	46.1%	+21.5%
Alliance	S Wilson	1,409		
Labour	L Morgan	638	27.1%	−11.1%
Labour	B Forster	602		
Conservative	M Battye	192	8.1%	−18%
Conservative	Y Mountain	175		

=== Normanby ===
Normanby
Party	Candidate	Votes	%	±%
Conservative	D Moore	930	45.7%	−6.9%
Conservative	I Priestman	713		
Labour	J Pallister	668	32.8%	+5.3%
Labour	J Simms	584		
Alliance	P Davison	436	21.4%	+1.5%
Alliance	A Golden	400		

=== Ormesby ===
Ormesby
Party	Candidate	Votes	%	±%
Alliance	G Nightingale	879	49.7%	+36.6%
Alliance	J Kay	744		
Conservative	J Fagan	646	36.6%	−19.3%
Conservative	P Zoryk	609		
Labour	R Duffy	242	13.7%	−9.5%
Labour	J Jarvis	223		

=== Overfields ===
Overfields
Party	Candidate	Votes	%	±%
Labour	W Towers	790	41.7%	−14.6%
Labour	J Seago	690		
Independent	J Docherty	616	24.1%	+24.1%
Alliance	H Monks	364	19.2%	−2.3%
Alliance	S Marshall	359		
Conservative	P Milner	285	15%	−7.3%
Conservative	P Pickering	283		

=== Redcar ===
Redcar
Party	Candidate	Votes	%	±%
Conservative	T Hoyle	915	36.7%	−3.9%
Conservative	J Dyball	891		
Independent	J White	616	24.7%	+2.4%
Alliance	D Raine	491	19.7%	−0.4%
Labour	J Coombe	473	19%	+1.9%
Labour	J Pearson	408		
Alliance	S Green	371		

=== Saltburn ===
Saltburn
Party	Candidate	Votes	%	±%
Conservative	B Cobb	1,620	52.9%	+0.3%
Conservative	M Hibbert	1,487		
Conservative	K Muir	1,453		
Alliance	K Daws	852	27.8%	+11.9%
Alliance	A Wilson	758		
Labour	C Hammond	589	19.2%	+3.5%
Labour	T Lewis	558		
Labour	M Cooper	555		
Alliance	T Goddard	533		

=== Skelton ===
Skelton
Party	Candidate	Votes	%	±%
Conservative	L Douglass	1,808	60.4%	−2.0%
Conservative	P Jeffels	1,379		
Conservative	P Wilkinson	1,254		
Labour	E Wesson	940	31.4%	−6.2%
Labour	J Stephen	836		
Labour	A Deans	776		
Alliance	J Richardson	245	8.2%	+8.2%
Alliance	C Watts	236		
Alliance	C Terry	219		

=== Skinningrove ===
Skinningrove
Party	Candidate	Votes	%	±%
Labour	V Teasdale	318	47.8%	−20.7%
Green	D Tuffery	130	19.5%	+19.5%
Conservative	A Watts	101	15.2%	−16.3%
Independent	M Hughlock	78	11.7%	+11.7%
Alliance	N Russell	38	5.7%	+5.7%

=== South Bank ===
South Bank
Party	Candidate	Votes	%	±%
Labour	S Jeffrey	990	46.1%	−28.2%
Labour	S Szintai	823		
Independent	A Seed	798	37.2%	+11.5%
Independent	E Powell	385		
Alliance	I Hesletine	202	9.4%	+9.4%
Alliance	J Plummer	182		
Conservative	P Chisholm	158	7.4%	+7.4%

=== St. Germains ===
St. Germains
Party	Candidate	Votes	%	±%
Alliance	B Williams	1,190	46.1%	+25.7%
Alliance	J Cawthorne	888		
Labour	G Houchen	865	30.3%	+13.0%
Conservative	A Gaskin	796	27.9%	−8.3%
Labour	D Jones	700		
Conservative	J Green	682		

=== Teesville ===
Teesville
Party	Candidate	Votes	%	±%
Labour	K McBride	1,174	47.2%	−14.8%
Labour	P O'Neill	1,151		
Labour	A Brooke	1,123		
Alliance	K Giles	769	30.9%	+30.9%
Alliance	J Plummer	709		
Alliance	D Howells	693		
Conservative	L Richardson	545	21.9%	−16.1%
Conservative	G Peacock	525		
Conservative	S Crane	519		

=== West Dyke ===
West Dyke
Party	Candidate	Votes	%	±%
Conservative	A Gwenlan	1,344	47.2%	−14.8%
Conservative	D Lane	1,311		
Conservative	K Haith	1,231		
Alliance	J Benbow	953	33.6%	+11.3%
Alliance	S Blake	845		
Alliance	T Gare	821		
Labour	C Davis	537	18.9%	+3.9%
Labour	J Organ	499		
Labour	K Hall	498		
