= 1976 Langbaurgh Borough Council election =

1976 UK local government election

Elections to Langbaurgh Borough Council took place on 10 May 1976. The whole council was up for election under new boundary changes. The Conservative Party won the most seats and took overall control of the council.

== Election result ==
Langbaurgh Borough Council local election result 1976
Party	Seats	Gains	Losses	Net gain/loss	Seats %	Votes %	Votes	+/−
Labour	19			-13	31.7%	36.9%	34,463	-38,614
Conservative	33			+6	55%	51.7%	48,318	-7,926
Independent	8			+3	13.3%	11.5%	10,707	-5,587
Liberal	0			n/a		1.1%	1,067	+1,067

== Ward results ==
=== Bankside ===
Bankside
Party	Candidate	Votes	%	±%
Labour	J Thompson	412	55.1%	
Labour	R Haining	401		
Conservative	R Adamson	336	44.9%	
Conservative	M Hardy	332		

=== Belmont ===
Belmont
Party	Candidate	Votes	%	±%
Conservative	B Lythgoe	1,272	72.1%	
Conservative	B Roberts	1,216		
Labour	A Gilbert	491	27.9%	
Labour	M Barr	452		

=== Brotton ===
Brotton
Party	Candidate	Votes	%	±%
Labour	C Stibbs	1,018	50%	
Conservative	J Askew	1,018	50%	
Conservative	P Thompson	907		
Labour	I Little	865		

=== Church Lane ===
Church Lane
Party	Candidate	Votes	%	±%
Labour	G Hodgson	628	72%	
Labour	W Herlingshaw	588		
Conservative	G McPherson	244	28%	

=== Coatham ===
Coatham
Party	Candidate	Votes	%	±%
Conservative	J Dyball	706	42.9%	
Conservative	R Hall	642		
Independent	S Birt	636	38.7%	
Labour	D Cummings	302	18.4%	
Labour	M Jeffers	258		

=== Dormanstown ===
Dormanstown
Party	Candidate	Votes	%	±%
Labour	T Collins	1,491	57.5%	
Labour	R Jones	1,216		
Labour	A Taylor	1,188		
Independent	P Higgins	1,103	42.5%	

=== Eston ===
Eston
Party	Candidate	Votes	%	±%
Conservative	C Baldwin	817	50.4%	
Labour	I Cole	803	49.6%	
Conservative	D A'Court	773		
Conservative	M Fenwick	740		
Labour	F Hunter	681		
Labour	M Jeffers	628		

=== Grangetown ===
Grangetown
Party	Candidate	Votes	%	±%
Labour	P Harford	774	70.9%	
Labour	S Tombe	745		
Conservative	A Lee	318	29.1%	
Conservative	A Wright	307		

=== Guisborough ===
Guisborough
Party	Candidate	Votes	%	±%
Conservative	W Richardson	1,209	44.5%	
Conservative	D Humphrey	1,036		
Conservative	M Hopwood	971		
Labour	J Morgan	965	35.5%	
Labour	R Lewis	731		
Labour	F Christie	650		
Liberal	L Wilkinson	545	20%	

=== Hutton ===
Hutton
Party	Candidate	Votes	%	±%
Conservative	A Sweeting	832	70.3%	
Liberal	A Elliott	236	20.1%	
Labour	H Tout	114	9.6%	

=== Kirkleatham ===
Kirkleatham
Party	Candidate	Votes	%	±%
Conservative	S Hall	836	50.5%	
Conservative	D Cook	834		
Labour	J Taylor	818	49.5%	
Labour	M Dowling	779		
Labour	J Fitzgerald	761		

=== Lockwood ===
Lockwood
Party	Candidate	Votes	%	±%
Labour	A Bate	742	58.2%	
Conservative	E Plunkett	534	41.8%	
Conservative	W Bulmer	449		

=== Loftus ===
Loftus
Party	Candidate	Votes	%	±%
Independent	J Theobold	1,346	42.9%	
Labour	B Scott	972	31%	
Conservative	J Grimstead	821	26.2%	
Labour	N Lantsbery	815		

=== Longbeck ===
Longbeck
Party	Candidate	Votes	%	±%
Independent	E Lightwing	1,135	33.9%	
Labour	G Houchen	1,122	33.5%	
Conservative	E Mann	1,096	32.7%	
Conservative	I Wilmshurst	1,092		
Conservative	K Johnson	1,046		
Labour	D Timothy	932		
Labour	M Garbett	767		

=== Newcomen ===
Newcomen
Party	Candidate	Votes	%	±%
Independent	D Evans	683	32.6%	
Conservative	O Jessop	591	28.2	
Labour	W Dagg	540	25.7%	
Labour	A Mills	494		
Conservative	C Ridsdale	433		
Liberal	S Wilson	284	13.5%	

=== Normanby ===
Normanby
Party	Candidate	Votes	%	±%
Conservative	D Moore	1,010	72.8%	
Conservative	A Wright	907		
Labour	K Mole	378	27.2%	
Labour	T Moss	319		

=== Ormesby ===
Ormesby
Party	Candidate	Votes	%	±%
Conservative	J Fagan	859	77.8%	
Conservative	P Zoryk	824		
Labour	D Watson	245	22.2%	
Labour	G Ansell	245		

=== Overfields ===
Overfields
Party	Candidate	Votes	%	±%
Labour	J Sickling	551	51.4%	
Conservative	A Fagan	522	48.6%	
Labour	W Towers	521		
Conservative	R Porritt	479		

=== Redcar ===
Redcar
Party	Candidate	Votes	%	±%
Conservative	A Kidd	925	33.3%	
Independent	G Smith	923	33.2%	
Conservative	R Cowie	839		
Independent	F Walker	608	21.9%	
Labour	J Coombs	321	11.6%	

=== Saltburn ===
Saltburn
Party	Candidate	Votes	%	±%
Conservative	A Collins	1,628	58.4%	
Independent	A Atterton	1,159	41.6%	
Conservative	D Reid	1,129		
Conservative	S Turner	1,093		

=== Skelton ===
Skelton
Party	Candidate	Votes	%	±%
Conservative	L Douglass	1,579	59.7%	
Conservative	J Mussett	1,190		
Labour	I Johnson	1,067	40.3%	
Conservative	E Laverick	1,059		
Labour	K Price	717		

=== Skinningrove ===
Skinningrove
Party	Candidate	Votes	%	±%
Independent	R Grant	487	61.5%	
Labour	V Teesdale	305	38.5%	

=== South Bank ===
South Bank
Party	Candidate	Votes	%	±%
Labour	A Seed	732	43.1%	
Labour	C Christie	608		
Conservative	J Myrddin-Baker	608	35.8%	
Conservative	T Myrddin-Baker	593		
Independent	A Smith	359	21.1%	

=== St. Germains ===
St. Germains
Party	Candidate	Votes	%	±%
Independent	K Barker	1,019	40.7%	
Conservative	R Lawrenson	783	31.3%	
Conservative	J Bower	728		
Labour	J Vinton	703	28.1%	
Labour	W Vennard	568		

=== Teesville ===
Teesville
Party	Candidate	Votes	%	±%
Conservative	J Robinson	1,328	62.4%	
Conservative	W Bray	1,267		
Conservative	J Soakell	1,248		
Labour	I Hewitson	799	37.6%	
Labour	J Finegan	690		
Labour	J Briggs	676		

=== West Dyke ===
West Dyke
Party	Candidate	Votes	%	±%
Conservative	A Gwenlan	1,382	44.9%	
Conservative	D Lane	1,324		
Independent	D Bell	1,249	40.6%	
Conservative	B Lane	1,201		
Labour	A Carr	445	14.5%	
Labour	R Dowling	430		
