= 1995 Redcar and Cleveland Borough Council election =

1995 UK local government election

The 1995 Redcar and Cleveland Borough Council election took place on 4 May 1995. The whole council was up for election as it was the first election since the formation of the Unitary Authority after replacing Langbaurgh Borough Council. The Labour Party won the most seats and took overall control of the council.

== Election result ==
Redcar and Cleveland local election result 1995
Party	Seats	Gains	Losses	Net gain/loss	Seats %	Votes %	Votes	+/−
Labour	49	18	2	+16	83.1%	58.1%	69,073	+2,863
Conservative	1	0	19	-19	1.7%	24.2%	28,808	-8,806
Liberal Democrats	7	2	1	+1	11.9%	13.5%	15,986	-9,061
Independent	2	2	0	+2	3.4%	4.0%	4,791	+2,467
Green	0					0.1%	156	-479
