= 1979 Langbaurgh Borough Council election =

1979 UK local government election

Elections to Langbaurgh Borough Council took place on 3 May 1979. The election took place on the same day as the 1979 UK General Election and the whole council was up for election. The Labour Party won most seats and took over control of the council from the Conservative Party.

== Election result ==
Langbaurgh Borough Council local election result 1979
Party	Seats	Gains	Losses	Net gain/loss	Seats %	Votes %	Votes	+/−
Labour	32	13	0	+13	53.3	45.8	78,273	+43,810
Conservative	22	1	12	-11	36.7	45.4	77,543	+29,225
Independent	6	0	2	-2	10.0	7.7	13,235	+2,528
Liberal	0			n/a	n/a	1.1	1,801	+734

== Ward results ==
=== Bankside ===
Bankside
Party	Candidate	Votes	%	±%
Labour	J Thompson	1,161	65.6%	+10.5%
Labour	R Haining	1,106		
Conservative	H Fenwick	608	34.4%	−10.5%
Conservative	H Johnson	545		

=== Belmont ===
Belmont
Party	Candidate	Votes	%	±%
Conservative	P Hopwood	2,236	57.7%	−14.4%
Conservative	B Lythgoe	2,511		
Labour	K Pitchford	1,861	42.3%	+14.4%
Labour	H Tout	1,598		

=== Brotton ===
Brotton
Party	Candidate	Votes	%	±%
Labour	R Barton	1,315	44.2%	−5.8%
Labour	A Barton	1,267		
Conservative	J Askew	1,254	42.2%	−7.8%
Conservative	M Grant	939		
Liberal	C Watts	405	13.6%	+13.6%
Liberal	L Wilkinson	248		

=== Church Lane ===
Church Lane
Party	Candidate	Votes	%	±%
Labour	G Hodgson	1,954	83.4%	+11.4%
Labour	W Herlingshaw	1,905		
Conservative	G McPherson	390	16.6%	−11.4%
Conservative	W Slegg	361		

=== Coatham ===
Coatham
Party	Candidate	Votes	%	±%
Independent	J White	1,018	36.7%	−2%
Conservative	J Dyball	925	33.4%	−9.5%
Conservative	R Hall	919		
Labour	M Dowling	830	29.9%	+11.5%

=== Dormanstown ===
Dormanstown
Party	Candidate	Votes	%	±%
Labour	T Collins	2,948	53.3%	−4.2%
Labour	A Taylor	2,386		
Labour	R Jones	2,364		
Conservative	A Horner	1,362	24.6%	+24.6%
Independent	D Kelsey	1,223	22.1%	−20.4%

=== Eston ===
Eston
Party	Candidate	Votes	%	±%
Labour	I Cole	2,288	67.3%	+16.9%
Labour	M Learman	2,189		
Labour	A Harvison	2,082		
Conservative	D A'Court	1,111	32.7%	−16.9%
Conservative	R A'Court	1,058		
Conservative	M Curry	1,035		

=== Grangetown ===
Grangetown
Party	Candidate	Votes	%	±%
Labour	P Harford	2,080	85.3%	+14.4%
Labour	S Tombe	1,892		
Conservative	A Soakell	358	14.7%	−14.4%
Conservative	R McLay	354		

=== Guisborough ===
Guisborough
Party	Candidate	Votes	%	±%
Conservative	W Richardson	1,873	54%	+9.5%
Conservative	M Hopwood	1,767		
Conservative	J Gaskin	1,651		
Labour	F Christie	1,593	46%	+10.5%
Labour	G Houston	1,517		
Labour	J Marvell	1,431		

=== Hutton ===
Hutton
Party	Candidate	Votes	%	±%
Conservative	B Bradley	1,786	81.9%	+10.6%
Labour	P Trainor	394	18.1%	−2%

=== Kirkleatham ===
Kirkleatham
Party	Candidate	Votes	%	±%
Labour	J Taylor	2,153	56.2%	+5.7%
Labour	R Roberts	2,122		
Labour	K Nilan	2,080		
Conservative	S Hall	1,681	43.8%	−5.7%
Conservative	R Day	1,623		
Conservative	D Horner	1,603		

=== Lockwood ===
Lockwood
Party	Candidate	Votes	%	±%
Labour	S Kay	1,167	53.1%	−5.1%
Conservative	C Watson	1,032	46.9%	+5.1%
Conservative	E Carter	984		

=== Loftus ===
Loftus
Party	Candidate	Votes	%	±%
Independent	J Theobold	2,530	42.9%	+1.9%
Labour	B Scott	2,033	36%	+5%
Labour	N Lantsbery	1,718		
Conservative	C Ellerby	1,079	19.1%	−7.1%

=== Longbeck ===
Longbeck
Party	Candidate	Votes	%	±%
Conservative	E Mann	2,405	50%	+16.1%
Labour	G Houchen	2,401	50%	+16.5%
Conservative	N Cooney	2,199		
Conservative	G Lawrenson	2,085		
Labour	M Lambert	1,674		
Labour	M Jones	1,634		

=== Newcomen ===
Newcomen
Party	Candidate	Votes	%	±%
Labour	W Dagg	1,436	43%	+17.7%
Labour	A Mills	1,352		
Conservative	D Jessop	1,155	34.6%	+6.4%
Conservative	S Birt	1,010		
Independent	J Preston	748	22.4%	−10.2%

=== Normanby ===
Normanby
Party	Candidate	Votes	%	±%
Conservative	D Moore	1,766	59.1%	−13.7%
Conservative	A Wright	1,396		
Labour	J Briggs	1,222	40.9%	+13.7%

=== Ormesby ===
Ormesby
Party	Candidate	Votes	%	±%
Conservative	J Fagan	1,548	63.7%	−14.1%
Conservative	P Zoryk	1,475		
Labour	R Lewis	881	36.3%	+14.1%

=== Overfields ===
Overfields
Party	Candidate	Votes	%	±%
Labour	J Sickling	1,866	65.6%	+15.2%
Labour	W Towers	1,559		
Conservative	A Fagan	977	34.4%	−15.2%
Conservative	D Adamson	958		

=== Redcar ===
Redcar
Party	Candidate	Votes	%	±%
Independent	G Smith	1,527	37%	−18.2%
Conservative	N Richards	1,517	36.8%	+3.5%
Conservative	A Kidd	1,511		
Labour	J Coombs	1,082	26.2%	+14.6%

=== Saltburn ===
Saltburn
Party	Candidate	Votes	%	±%
Conservative	A Collins	2,428	37.4%	−21%
Independent	A Atterton	2,009	48.8%	+7.2%
Conservative	P Clark	1,469		
Conservative	D Frizelle	1,228		
Independent	J Fulcher	1,166		
Labour	D Walsh	894	13.8%	+13.8%

=== Skelton ===
Skelton
Party	Candidate	Votes	%	±%
Conservative	L Douglass	2,312	53.2%	−6.5%
Conservative	W Hill	2,146		
Labour	I Johnson	2,035	46.8%	+6.5%
Conservative	J Mussett	1,533		
Labour	K Price	1,295		

=== Skinningrove ===
Skinningrove
Party	Candidate	Votes	%	±%
Labour	R Tough	633	59.9%	+21.4%
Conservative	C Simmons	423	40.1%	+40.1%

=== South Bank ===
South Bank
Party	Candidate	Votes	%	±%
Labour	A Seed	1,850	68.2%	+25.1%
Labour	C Christie	1,641		
Conservative	T Robinson	862	35.8%	−4%
Conservative	J Myrddin-Baker	857		

=== St. Germains ===
St. Germains
Party	Candidate	Votes	%	±%
Independent	K Barker	1,915	42.4%	+1.7%
Conservative	R Lawrenson	1,326	29.3%	−2%
Labour	J Wiggins	1,279	28.3%	+0.2%
Conservative	D Halliday	1,240		

=== Teesville ===
Teesville
Party	Candidate	Votes	%	±%
Labour	H York	2,259	56.9%	+19.3%
Labour	I Hewitson	2,259		
Labour	M McCormack	2,135		
Conservative	J Robinson	1,714	43.1%	−19.3%
Conservative	L Shepherd	1,600		
Conservative	J Soakell	1,590		

=== West Dyke ===
West Dyke
Party	Candidate	Votes	%	±%
Conservative	A Gwenlan	1,951	31.7%	−13.2%
Conservative	D Lane	1,929		
Independent	D Bell	1,847	30.1%	−10.5%
Conservative	F Walker	1,588		
Labour	J Curry	1,200	19.5%	+5%
Liberal	S Wilson	1,148	18.7%	+18.7%
