= 2003 Redcar and Cleveland Borough Council election =

2003 UK local government election

Map of the results of the 2003 Redcar and Cleveland council election. Labour in red, Liberal Democrats in yellow, Conservatives in blue, independents in grey and East Cleveland Independents in pink.

An election took place on 1 May 2003 to elect members of Redcar and Cleveland Unitary Council in England. The whole council was up for election with boundary changes since the last election in 1999. The Labour party lost overall control of the council to no overall control.

== Background ==
Between 1999 and 2003 the Local Government Boundary Commission for England had made changes to the wards of the council. The changes included renaming Belmont ward to Westworth, and Redcar ward to Zetland, with 18 of the 22 wards having boundary changes.

Before the election Labour ran the council with 31 seats, compared to 14 Conservatives, 11 Liberal Democrats and 3 East Cleveland Independents. In total 151 candidates stood for the 59 seats that were being contested, an increase of 9 from the 1999 election.

The election had a trial of all postal voting to try and increase turnout, with ballots being delivered to voters 2 weeks before the election.

== Election result ==
The count for Brotton ward was suspended on election night after 2 recounts and completed the following day. Overall turnout at the election was 51.5%, an increase from 37% in 1999.

Labour lost their majority on the council, finishing with 23 seats, 7 short of a majority. Among the Labour councillors to lose seats was the leader of the council Dave Walsh in Eston ward, after he had moved to contest Eston, instead of Loftus which he had previously been a councillor for.

Following the election Labour chose George Dunning, formerly the deputy leader, as the new leader of the party on the council, defeating Dave McLuckie by 12 votes to 11. Meanwhile, the 8 independents joined, with Steve Kay as their leader, in an East Cleveland, Eston and Marske Independents group. After negotiations the Liberal Democrat, Conservative and Independent groups formed a coalition to take control of the council from Labour.

Redcar and Cleveland local election result 2003
Party	Seats	Gains	Losses	Net gain/loss	Seats %	Votes %	Votes	+/−
Labour	23	0	8	-8	39.0	36.1	47,411	+4,313
Liberal Democrats	15	4	0	+4	25.4	26.4	35,596	+13,612
Conservative	13	5	6	-1	22.0	25.6	34,007	+10,145
Independent	4			+4	6.8	7.9	10,325	+6,353
East Cleveland Independent	4			+1	6.8	4.0	5,202	+5,202

One East Cleveland Independent was unopposed at the election.

== Ward results ==
Brotton (3)
Party	Candidate	Votes	%	±%
Labour	Brian Hogg	1,189		
Liberal Democrats	Valerie Miller	1,036		
Liberal Democrats	Kay Walker	1,002		
Labour	Barry Hunt	985		
Liberal Democrats	Norma Morris	834		
Labour	Eileen Goodenough	796		
Conservative	Roberta Jackson	497		
Turnout		6,339		

Coatham (2)
Party	Candidate	Votes	%	±%
Liberal Democrats	Josephine Crawford	788		
Liberal Democrats	Irene Curr	670		
Labour	Raymond Goddard	585		
Independent	Allan Parsons	492		
Conservative	Edward Dolan	378		
Labour	Paul McGrath	376		
Turnout		3,289		

Dormanstown (3)
Party	Candidate	Votes	%	±%
Labour	Vilma Collins	1,276		
Labour	Cliff Houlding	1,185		
Labour	Peter Todd	1,058		
Liberal Democrats	Elsie Houston	806		
Independent	Peter Abramson	793		
Liberal Democrats	Alan Langner	775		
Liberal Democrats	Alan Slater	773		
Conservative	Frederick Walker	414		
Turnout		7,080		

Eston (3)
Party	Candidate	Votes	%	±%
Independent	Ann Higgins	1,579		
Independent	Vincent Smith	1,487		
Independent	Christopher Beadle	1,464		
Labour	John Simms	1,154		
Labour	David Walsh	856		
Labour	Patrick Harford	841		
Conservative	Stewart Dadd	309		
Turnout		7,690		

Grangetown (2)
Party	Candidate	Votes	%	±%
Labour	Lynn Pallister	927		
Labour	Peter Dunlop	857		
Liberal Democrats	Paul Tuffs	366		
Liberal Democrats	Harry Jones	283		
Conservative	Philip Jeffels	62		
Turnout		2,495		

Guisborough (3)
Party	Candidate	Votes	%	±%
Conservative	Bill Clarke	1,405		
Conservative	Anne Franklin	1,399		
Labour	Keith Pudney	1,277		
Labour	David Punshon	1,266		
Conservative	John Hale	1,217		
Labour	Denise Bunn	1,187		
Liberal Democrats	Eileen Slater	337		
Turnout		8,088		

Hutton (3)
Party	Candidate	Votes	%	±%
Conservative	Graham Jeffery	1,835		
Conservative	Valerie Halton	1,816		
Conservative	Peter Spencer	1,708		
Liberal Democrats	Shelagh Kidd	847		
Liberal Democrats	Judith Mackuin	791		
Liberal Democrats	Arthur Kidd	767		
Labour	Denise Robson	613		
Labour	Simon Matthews	605		
Turnout		8,982		

Kirkleatham (3)
Party	Candidate	Votes	%	±%
Labour	Norman Davies	1,241		
Labour	Brenda Forster	1,228		
Labour	Mark Hannon	1,142		
Liberal Democrats	Kelly Abbott	657		
Liberal Democrats	John Reveley	624		
Liberal Democrats	Carol Johnson	623		
Conservative	Joan Bolton	520		
Conservative	Michael Moody	511		
Conservative	Jacqueline Rouse	417		
Turnout		6,963		

Lockwood
Party	Candidate	Votes	%	±%
East Cleveland Independent	Stephen Kay	unopposed		

Loftus (3)
Party	Candidate	Votes	%	±%
East Cleveland Independent	David Fitzpatrick	1,918		
Labour	Eric Jackson	1,149		
East Cleveland Independent	Mary Lanigan	1,045		
East Cleveland Independent	Stephanie Aplin-Wakefield	969		
Independent	Linda Bell	735		
Labour	Christine Swales	486		
Labour	Roger Clipsham	447		
Conservative	Susan King	282		
Turnout		7,031		

Longbeck (3)
Party	Candidate	Votes	%	±%
Conservative	Norah Cooney	1,338		
Conservative	Vvera Moody	1,254		
Independent	Mike Findley	1,189		
Labour	Mike Stephen	574		
Liberal Democrats	Patricia Fisher	295		
Liberal Democrats	Margaret Plummer	281		
Liberal Democrats	Victoria Crawford	219		
Conservative	Andrew Dixon	152		
Turnout		5,302		

Newcomen (2)
Party	Candidate	Votes	%	±%
Liberal Democrats	Chris Abbott	1,423		
Liberal Democrats	Glynis Abbott	1,301		
Labour	Frederick Forster	438		
Conservative	Allan Gwenlan	197		
Conservative	George Bolton	123		
Turnout		3,482		

Normanby (3)
Party	Candidate	Votes	%	±%
Labour	Wendy Wall	1,534		
Labour	Carole Ealand	1,483		
Labour	David Tomlin	1,315		
Conservative	Paul Lennox	935		
Conservative	Sarah Dadd	731		
Conservative	Jennifer Bell	702		
Liberal Democrats	Andrew Broadhurst	321		
Liberal Democrats	Florence Sefton	310		
Liberal Democrats	Marjorie Paskin	303		
Turnout		7,634		

Ormesby (3)
Party	Candidate	Votes	%	±%
Liberal Democrats	Glyn Nightingale	1,959		
Liberal Democrats	Eric Empson	1,847		
Liberal Democrats	Irene Nightingale	1,784		
Labour	Richard White	577		
Conservative	Mary Dadd	459		
Turnout		6,626		

Saltburn (3)
Party	Candidate	Votes	%	±%
Conservative	Joan Sands	1,313		
Conservative	John Robinson	1,283		
Conservative	Barbara Harpham	1,129		
Labour	Joan Guy	1,024		
Labour	Cyril Hammond	863		
Liberal Democrats	Brian Grierson	703		
Liberal Democrats	Jill Clarke	299		
Liberal Democrats	Lilla Reveley	275		
Turnout		6,889		

Skelton (3)
Party	Candidate	Votes	%	±%
Labour	Brian Briggs	1,700		
Labour	David McLuckie	1,492		
Labour	Helen McLuckie	1,378		
Conservative	Geoffrey Shaw	1,194		
Conservative	James Carrolle	1,027		
Conservative	Michael King	1,021		
Turnout		7,812		

South Bank (3)
Party	Candidate	Votes	%	±%
Labour	Ian Jeffrey	1,476		
Labour	Pearl Hall	1,407		
Labour	Sylvia Szintai	1,354		
Liberal Democrats	Angela Draper	473		
Liberal Democrats	Michele Elcoate	455		
Conservative	Stuart Bell	374		
Turnout		5,539		

St Germains (3)
Party	Candidate	Votes	%	±%
Liberal Democrats	Marjorie Moses	1,763		
Liberal Democrats	Bill Goodwill	1,702		
Liberal Democrats	Margaret Wilson	1,477		
Independent	Peter Atkinson	1,025		
Independent	Kenneth Seymour	536		
Conservative	John Moody	487		
Labour	Peter Briggs	452		
Conservative	Vera Rider	428		
Labour	James Hill	355		
Turnout		8,225		

Teesville (3)
Party	Candidate	Votes	%	±%
Labour	Sheelagh Clarke	1,595		
Labour	George Dunning	1,405		
Labour	Norman Pickthall	1,239		
Conservative	David Tabner	881		
Conservative	Andrew Harris	878		
Conservative	Andrew Leach	803		
Independent	Paul Jackson	476		
Liberal Democrats	Gillian Cockburn	231		
Liberal Democrats	Gordon Plummer	221		
Liberal Democrats	Kenneth Cockburn	210		
Turnout		7,939		

West Dyke (3)
Party	Candidate	Votes	%	±%
Liberal Democrats	Joyce Benbow	1,971		
Liberal Democrats	Keith Blott	1,525		
Liberal Democrats	Mary Ovens	1,507		
Conservative	Adele Coleman	986		
Labour	Michael Blott	628		
Conservative	Gillian Dadd	544		
Conservative	Kenneth Emmerson	537		
Turnout		7,698		

Westworth (2)
Party	Candidate	Votes	%	±%
Conservative	Alma Thrower	756		
East Cleveland Independent	Bruce Mackenzie	660		
East Cleveland Independent	Tressa Cooper	610		
Labour	John Birtill	562		
Independent	David Williams	549		
Labour	Michael McGee	390		
Turnout		3,527		

Zetland (2)
Party	Candidate	Votes	%	±%
Conservative	Robert Stanway	845		
Conservative	Jean White	840		
Labour	Paul Dixon	791		
Labour	Albert Mills	653		
Liberal Democrats	Arthur Clarke	409		
Liberal Democrats	John Curr	353		
Turnout		3,891		
