= 1983 Langbaurgh Borough Council election =

1983 UK local government election

Elections to Langbaurgh Borough Council took place in May 1983. The whole council was up for election and The Labour Party won 31 seats giving it continued overall control of the council.

== Election result ==
Langbaurgh Borough Council local election result 1983
Party	Seats	Gains	Losses	Net gain/loss	Seats %	Votes %	Votes	+/−
Labour	31	2	3	-1	51.7%	43.7%	51,316	-26,957
Conservative	29	8	1	+7	48.3%	39%	45,757	-31,786
Alliance	0	n/a	n/a	n/a	n/a	11.6%	13,638	+11,837
Independent	0	0	6	-6	n/a	5.7%	6,744	-6,491

== Ward results ==
=== Bankside ===
Bankside
Party	Candidate	Votes	%	±%
Labour	R Haining	833	65.6%	+10.5%
Labour	S Tombe	753		
Alliance	N Bond	387	24.1%	+24.1%
Independent	K Helm	387	24.1%	+24.1%
Independent	S Jefferson	245		

=== Belmont ===
Belmont
Party	Candidate	Votes	%	±%
Conservative	B Lythgoe	1,449	45.4%	−12.2%
Conservative	P Hopwood	1,416		
Alliance	P Bosworth	1,059	33.2%	+33.2%
Labour	S Hunt	677	21.3%	−21%
Labour	J Marvell	616		

=== Brotton ===
Brotton
Party	Candidate	Votes	%	±%
Labour	V Miller	702	35.9%	−8.3%
Conservative	M Smith	678	34.7%	−7.5%
Conservative	K Hutchinson	645		
Labour	I Little	605		
Independent	A Slater	576	29.4%	+29.4%

=== Church Lane ===
Church Lane
Party	Candidate	Votes	%	±%
Labour	W Herlingshaw	875	87.3%	+3.9%
Labour	W Martin	873		
Alliance	J Mathewman	127	12.7%	+12.7%

=== Coatham ===
Coatham
Party	Candidate	Votes	%	±%
Conservative	R Hall	659	44.1%	+10.7%
Conservative	J Dyball	641		
Labour	J Coombe	317	21.2%	−8.7%
Independent	J White	316	21.2%	−15.5%
Labour	D Cummings	307		
Alliance	J McGowan	202	13.5%	+13.5%
Alliance	P Cockfroft	201		

=== Dormanstown ===
Dormanstown
Party	Candidate	Votes	%	±%
Labour	T Collins	1,836	62.8%	+9.5%
Labour	R Jones	1,710		
Labour	A Taylor	1,673		
Conservative	C Ridsdale	595	20.4%	−4.2%
Conservative	J Milner	591		
Conservative	P Milner	569		
Alliance	J Todd	491	16.8%	+16.8%
Alliance	D Best	469		

=== Eston ===
Eston
Party	Candidate	Votes	%	±%
Labour	I Cole	1,057	68.7%	+1.4%
Labour	R Cooney	1,025		
Labour	A Harvison	951		
Alliance	T Goddard	482	31.3%	+31.3%

=== Grangetown ===
Grangetown
Party	Candidate	Votes	%	±%
Labour	P Harford	1,040	68.9%	−16.4%
Labour	R Cooney	888		
Independent	J Tombe	286	19%	+19%
Alliance	R McLay	183	12.1%	+12.1%

=== Guisborough ===
Guisborough
Party	Candidate	Votes	%	±%
Conservative	W Richardson	1,299	55.6%	+1.6%
Conservative	J Hopwood	1,255		
Conservative	D Davies	1,196		
Labour	R Lewis	1,037	44.4%	−1.6%
Labour	A Barrett	1,013		
Labour	D Punshon	917		

=== Hutton ===
Hutton
Party	Candidate	Votes	%	±%
Conservative	B Bradley	1,135	71.2%	−10.7%
Alliance	L Wilkinson	328	20.6%	+20.6%
Labour	H Tout	130	8.2%	−9.9%

=== Kirkleatham ===
Kirkleatham
Party	Candidate	Votes	%	±%
Labour	K Nilan	1,148	39.9%	−16.3%
Labour	J Taylor	1,133		
Labour	R Roberts	1,062		
Conservative	A Wordsworth	947	33%	−10.8%
Conservative	S Birt	882		
Conservative	P Wright	863		
Alliance	E Dobson	404	14.1%	+14.1%
Independent	B Milburn	375	13%	+13%
Alliance	T Wilson	344		
Alliance	P Todd	344		

=== Lockwood ===
Lockwood
Party	Candidate	Votes	%	±%
Labour	S Kay	1,156	68.5%	+15.4%
Labour	N Loughran	1,000		
Conservative	R Wheeler	532	31.5%	−15.4%

=== Loftus ===
Loftus
Party	Candidate	Votes	%	±%
Labour	J Theobold	1,671	48.6%	+5.7%
Labour	B Scott	1,635		
Labour	N Lantsberry	1,523		
Conservative	R Haynes	962	28%	+8.9%
Alliance	D Penny	804	23.4%	+23.4%
Alliance	W Gibson	620		

=== Longbeck ===
Longbeck
Party	Candidate	Votes	%	±%
Conservative	N Cooney	1,640	48.5%	−1.5%
Conservative	P Gains-Burril	1,561		
Conservative	L Russell	1,435		
Labour	G Houchen	1,031	30.5%	−19.5%
Labour	M Jones	746		
Alliance	N Herrell	709	21%	+21%
Labour	A Mills	701		
Alliance	P Sigsworth	648		
Alliance	I Thompson	644		

=== Newcomen ===
Newcomen
Party	Candidate	Votes	%	±%
Labour	L Morgan	821	38.2%	−4.8%
Labour	B Forster	791		
Conservative	K Haith	562	26.1%	−8.5%
Conservative	M Kirkpatrick	542		
Alliance	S Wilson	529	24.6%	+24.6%
Alliance	R Thomas	441		
Independent	S Johnson	239	11.1%	−11.3%

=== Normanby ===
Normanby
Party	Candidate	Votes	%	±%
Conservative	D Moore	1,080	52.6%	−6.5%
Conservative	L Richardson	819		
Labour	J Briggs	564	27.5%	−13.4%
Labour	E Sickling	425		
Alliance	H Martin	408	19.9%	+19.9%

=== Ormesby ===
Ormesby
Party	Candidate	Votes	%	±%
Conservative	P Zoryk	907	55.9%	−7.8%
Conservative	J Fagan	898		
Labour	G Johnstone	376	23.2%	−13.1%
Alliance	J Jarvis	339	20.9%	+20.9%
Labour	K O'Neill	328		

=== Overfields ===
Overfields
Party	Candidate	Votes	%	±%
Labour	J Docherty	948	56.3%	−11.3%
Labour	W Towers	791		
Conservative	E Hall	375	22.3%	−12.1%
Alliance	K Bayley	362	21.5%	+21.5%

=== Redcar ===
Redcar
Party	Candidate	Votes	%	±%
Conservative	P Chisholm	1,150	40.6%	+3.8%
Conservative	R Binns	908		
Independent	G Smith	630	22.3%	−16.7%
Alliance	D Raine	568	20.1%	+20.1%
Labour	C Davis	483	17.1%	−9.1%

=== Saltburn ===
Saltburn
Party	Candidate	Votes	%	±%
Conservative	A Collins	1,918	52.6%	+15.2%
Conservative	B Brent	1,326		
Conservative	M Hibbert	1,289		
Labour	B Shepherd	578	15.9%	+2.1%
Alliance	P Kilsby	574	15.7%	+15.7%
Independent	F Shields	573	15.7%	−33.1%
Labour	J Faulkner	565		
Labour	M Shevis	546		
Independent	J Wingham	492		

=== Skelton ===
Skelton
Party	Candidate	Votes	%	±%
Conservative	R Hill	2,341	62.4%	+9.2%
Conservative	L Douglass	2,140		
Conservative	E Carey	1,472		
Labour	I Johnson	1,412	37.6%	−9.2%
Labour	E Wesson	754		
Labour	D McReddie	753		

=== Skinningrove ===
Skinningrove
Party	Candidate	Votes	%	±%
Labour	V Teasdale	485	68.5%	+8.6%
Conservative	K Hicks	223	31.5%	−8.6%

=== South Bank ===
South Bank
Party	Candidate	Votes	%	±%
Labour	A Seed	1,350	74.3%	+6.1%
Labour	C Christie	1,087		
Independent	O Reed	467	25.7%	+25.7%

=== St. Germains ===
St. Germains
Party	Candidate	Votes	%	±%
Conservative	E Lightwing	975	36.2%	+6.9%
Conservative	R Lawrenson	956		
Independent	K Daws	703	26.1%	−16.3%
Independent	K Barker	685		
Alliance	B Williams	551	20.4%	+20.4%
Labour	P Harford	466	17.3%	−11%
Labour	M Learman	392		

=== Teesville ===
Teesville
Party	Candidate	Votes	%	±%
Labour	I Hewitson	1,296	62%	+5.9%
Labour	H York	1,242		
Labour	M McCormack	1,237		
Conservative	J Mryddin-Baker	796	38%	−5.9%

=== West Dyke ===
West Dyke
Party	Candidate	Votes	%	±%
Conservative	D Lane	1,462	41.1%	+9.4%
Conservative	A Gwenlan	1,462		
Conservative	P Wright	1,206		
Alliance	J Benbow	793	22.3%	+22.3%
Independent	D Bell	770	21.6%	−8.5%
Alliance	S Wilson	627		
Labour	M Pearson	533	15%	−4.5%
Labour	P Todd	452		
