= 1991 Langbaurgh-on-Tees Borough Council election =

1991 UK local government election

The 1991 Langbaurgh on Tees Council election took place in May 1991 to elect members of Langbaurgh-on-Tees Council in England. The whole council was up for election under new boundaries and it would be the final election to Langbaurgh Borough Council, before it was replaced by Redcar and Cleveland Borough Council in 1995.

The Labour Party won the most seats and regained overall control of the council.

== Election result ==
Langbaurgh Borough Council local election result 1991
Party	Seats	Gains	Losses	Net gain/loss	Seats %	Votes %	Votes	+/−
Labour	33			▲6	55.9%	50.2%	66,210	+17,696
Conservative	20			▼4	33.9%	28.5%	37,614	-5,704
Liberal	6			▼1	10.2%	19%	25,047	-7,063
Independent	0			▼2		1.8%	2,324	-2,323
Green	0			N/A		0.5%	635	+505

== Ward results ==
=== Belmont ===
Belmont
Party	Candidate	Votes	%	±%
Conservative	B Lythgoe	1,167	47.4%	+4.5%
Conservative	P Hopwood	1,076		
Conservative	M Griffiths	1,058		
Labour	D Longstaff	850	34.6%	+15.6%
Labour	I Robinson	822		
Labour	R Douglass	808		
Liberal Democrats	P Allen	443	18.0%	−20.1%
Liberal Democrats	D Pickston	346		
Liberal Democrats	L Wilkinson	339		

=== Brotton ===
Brotton
Party	Candidate	Votes	%	±%
Conservative	M Smith	736	36.8%	+6.3%
Labour	G Findlay	711	35.5%	+7.2%
Labour	T Beswick	693		
Conservative	G Brown	560		
Independent	V Miller	554	27.7%	+15.9%

=== Coatham ===
Coatham
Party	Candidate	Votes	%	±%
Labour	K Taylor	528	33.8%	+7.1%
Labour	M Peacock	474		
Liberal Democrats	M Plummer	521	33.4%	+1.3%
Liberal Democrats	A Carter	520		
Conservative	K Thompson	513	32.8%	−8.4%
Conservative	W Wright	502		

=== Dormanstown ===
Dormanstown
Party	Candidate	Votes	%	±%
Labour	T Collins	1,788	62.7%	+12.1%
Labour	A Taylor	1,627		
Labour	M Pearson	1,611		
Conservative	Y Bennett	576	20.2%	−8.8%
Liberal Democrats	S Blake	487	17.1%	−3.3%
Liberal Democrats	J Crawford	466		
Liberal Democrats	L Sudron	359		

=== Eston ===
Eston
Party	Candidate	Votes	%	±%
Labour	A Booth	1,681	72.2%	+11.1%
Labour	A Jarvis	1,554		
Labour	A Harvison	1,532		
Liberal Democrats	G Cook	648	27.8%	+5.1%
Liberal Democrats	V Butler	621		
Liberal Democrats	G Plummer	578		

=== Grangetown ===
Grangetown
Party	Candidate	Votes	%	±%
Labour	B Mucklow	1,460	53.1%	−11.3%
Labour	B Roberts	1,299		
Labour	S Tombe	1,135		
Independent	J Walsh	925	33.6%	+33.6%
Liberal Democrats	T Phoenix	367	13.3%	−17.3%
Liberal Democrats	A Beck	332		
Independent	A Seed	308		
Liberal Democrats	Y Zipfell	287		

=== Guisborough ===
Guisborough
Party	Candidate	Votes	%	±%
Labour	K Drew	1,452	31.9%	−23.7%
Conservative	J Clarke	1,274	43.6%	+12.4%
Labour	F Christie	1,265		
Labour	B Whiteley	1,104		
Conservative	P Spencer	996		
Conservative	M Edwards	989		
Liberal Democrats	K Foster	195	6.7%	−10.7%
Liberal Democrats	M Plummer	193		
Liberal Democrats	J Wrightson	168		

=== Hutton ===
Hutton
Party	Candidate	Votes	%	±%
Conservative	B Bradley	1,450	67.3%	+6.1%
Conservative	D Davies	1,377		
Liberal Democrats	P Wilson	354	16.4%	−14.3%
Labour	H Robinson	351	16.3%	+8.4%
Labour	H Tout	339		

=== Kirkleatham ===
Kirkleatham
Party	Candidate	Votes	%	±%
Labour	N Davies	1,553	57.2%	+19.3%
Labour	K Nilan	1,508		
Labour	B Forster	1,479		
Conservative	A Wordsworth	656	24.2	−7.8%
Conservative	R Fortune	647		
Conservative	G Cook	615		
Liberal Democrats	G Abbott	407	15.0%	−4.3%
Liberal Democrats	P Wilson	349		
Liberal Democrats	B Cole	327		
Green	J Sanderson	100	3.7	+3.7%

=== Lockwood & Skinningrove ===
Lockwood & Skinningrove
Party	Candidate	Votes	%	±%
Labour	S Kay	1,608	76.3%	n/a (new ward)
Labour	V Teesdale	1,404		
Conservative	A Richardson	500	23.7%	n/a (new ward)
Conservative	I Whitwell	465		

=== Loftus ===
Loftus
Party	Candidate	Votes	%	±%
Labour	B Scott	1,401	48.4%	+0.3%
Labour	A Mason	1,365		
Labour	N Lantsbery	1,301		
Conservative	S Haddon	957	33.1%	−1.2%
Independent	D Healey	537	18.5%	+18.5%

=== Longbeck ===
Longbeck
Party	Candidate	Votes	%	±%
Conservative	N Cooney	1,686	48.2%	+2.1%
Conservative	V Moody	1,540		
Conservative	L Russell	1,534		
Labour	G Houchen	1,481	42.4%	+9.5%
Labour	J Woods	1,281		
Labour	N Green	1,269		
Liberal Democrats	M Cole	330	9.4%	−11.6%
Liberal Democrats	N Clayden	296		

=== Newcomen ===
Newcomen
Party	Candidate	Votes	%	±%
Liberal Democrats	C Abbott	1,612	78.7%	+13.9%
Liberal Democrats	S Wilson	1,492		
Labour	W Birtwhistle	436	21.3%	−5.8%
Labour	C Pickett	414		

=== Normanby ===
Normanby
Party	Candidate	Votes	%	±%
Labour	R Duffy	1,388	47.4%	+14.6%
Labour	I Cole	1,379		
Labour	S Readman	1,246		
Conservative	D Moore	1133	38.7	−7.0%
Conservative	D Tabner	961		
Liberal Democrats	E Wilson	407	13.9%	−7.5%
Liberal Democrats	I Heseltine	307		
Liberal Democrats	E Sickling	272		
