= 1999 Redcar and Cleveland Borough Council election =

1999 UK local government election

The 1999 Redcar and Cleveland Borough Council election took place on 6 May 1999 to elect members of Redcar and Cleveland Unitary Council in England. The whole council was up for election and the Labour Party stayed in overall control of the council.

== Election result ==
Overall turnout at the election was 37%.

Redcar and Cleveland local election result 1999
Party	Seats	Gains	Losses	Net gain/loss	Seats %	Votes %	Votes	+/−
Labour	32	+1	-18	-17	54.2	45.8	43,098	-25,975
Conservative	14	+14	-1	+13	23.7	25.4	23,862	+3,054
Liberal Democrats	11	+6	-2	+4	18.6	23.3	21,984	+5,998
Independent	2			0	3.4	4.2	3,972	-809
Socialist Labour	0				0.0	0.7	663	+663
Green	0				0.0	0.59	551	+395
