= 2011 Redcar and Cleveland Borough Council election =

British local council election

Map of the results of the 2011 Redcar and Cleveland council election. Labour in red, Liberal Democrats in yellow, Conservatives in blue and independents in grey.

The 2011 Redcar and Cleveland Borough Council election took place on 5 May 2011 to elect members of Redcar and Cleveland Unitary Council in England. The whole council was up for election and the Labour Party gained overall control of the council from no overall control.

== Election result ==
Redcar and Cleveland local election result 2011
Party	Seats	Gains	Losses	Net gain/loss	Seats %	Votes %	Votes	+/−
Labour	32	9	5	▲4	54.2	42.07	45,535	
Liberal Democrats	16	5	2	▲3	27.1	25.49	26,379	
Conservative	6	0	5	▼5	10.2	17.07	17,668	
East Cleveland Independent	3	2	0	▲2	5.1	1.9	1,968	
Independent	2	0	4	▼4	3.4	10.7	11,080	
Eston Independents	0	0	2	▼2	0.0	2.46	2,544	
UKIP	0				0.0	0.29	297	

== Ward results ==
=== Brotton ===
Brotton
Party	Candidate	Votes	%	±%
Labour	Brian Hogg	776		
East Cleveland Independent	Barry Hunt	679		
Labour	Doreen Rudland	620		
Labour	Richard Rudland	614		
East Cleveland Independent	Kay Walker	547		
Conservative	Don Agar	508		
UKIP	Trevor Welburn	297		
Liberal Democrats	Valerie Miller	295		
Turnout				
Labour hold		Swing		
East Cleveland Independent gain from Labour				
Labour hold		Swing		

=== Coatham ===
Coatham
Party	Candidate	Votes	%	±%
Liberal Democrats	Josie Crawford	645		
Liberal Democrats	Irene Curr	599		
Labour	Ray Ardron	511		
Labour	David Learoyd	420		
Conservative	Stewart Dadd	160		
Turnout				
Liberal Democrats hold		Swing		
Liberal Democrats hold		Swing		

=== Dormanstown ===
Dormanstown
Party	Candidate	Votes	%	±%
Liberal Democrats	Eric Howden	917		
Labour	Ray Goddard	912		
Liberal Democrats	John Earl	856		
Liberal Democrats	Lawrence Jones	849		
Labour	John Taylor	821		
Labour	Neil Bendelow	763		
Conservative	Frances Bain	182		
Turnout				
Liberal Democrats gain from Labour		Swing		
Labour hold		Swing		
Liberal Democrats gain from Labour		Swing		

=== Eston ===
Eston
Party	Candidate	Votes	%	±%
Labour	Olwyn Peters	1,038		
Labour	Christopher Massey	965		
Labour	Steven Goldswain	926		
Eston Independent	Ann Higgins	923		
Eston Independent	Geoff McPherson	815		
Eston Independent	Vincent Smith	806		
Conservative	Brian Hughes-Mundy	128		
Liberal Democrats	Helen Hadfield	94		
Liberal Democrats	Gail Leggett	80		
Liberal Democrats	Yvonne Joy	70		
Turnout				
Labour hold		Swing		
Labour hold		Swing		
Labour gain from Independent		Swing		

=== Grangetown ===
Grangetown
Party	Candidate	Votes	%	±%
Labour	Lynn Pallister	575		
Labour	Peter Dunlop	532		
Liberal Democrats	Debbie Abbott	88		
Liberal Democrats	Angela Draper	86		
Conservative	Elizabeth Grainger	44		
Turnout				
Labour hold		Swing		
Labour hold		Swing		

=== Guisborough ===
Guisborough
Party	Candidate	Votes	%	±%
Labour	Denise Bunn	1,383		
Labour	Joe Keenan	1,338		
Labour	Bill Suthers	1,297		
Conservative	Bill Clarke	1,136		
Conservative	Derrick Langley	907		
Conservative	George Tinsley	729		
Liberal Democrats	Anthony Thomas	295		
Turnout				
Labour hold		Swing		
Labour hold		Swing		
Labour gain from Conservative		Swing		

=== Hutton ===
Hutton
Party	Candidate	Votes	%	±%
Conservative	Graham Jeffery	1,562		
Conservative	Valerie Halton	1,532		
Conservative	Peter Spencer	1,367		
Labour	Shelagh Holyoake	940		
Labour	Ramin Peroznejad	717		
Liberal Democrats	Graham Kidd	672		
Labour	Dominic Smith	622		
Turnout				
Conservative hold		Swing		
Conservative hold		Swing		
Conservative hold		Swing		

=== Kirkleatham ===
Kirkleatham
Party	Candidate	Votes	%	±%
Labour	Mark Hannon	777		
Labour	Brenda Forster	768		
Labour	Dale Quigley	689		
Independent	John Hannon	650		
Liberal Democrats	Theresa Cave	576		
Liberal Democrats	Debi Waite	520		
Independent	Ben Sheperia	506		
Liberal Democrats	Rod Waite	472		
Conservative	Jack Hassan	295		
Turnout				
Labour hold		Swing		
Labour hold		Swing		
Labour hold		Swing		

=== Lockwood ===
Lockwood
Party	Candidate	Votes	%	±%
East Cleveland Independent	Steve Kay	742		
Labour	Jamie Waistell	52		
Conservative	Gillian Dadd	43		
Turnout				
East Cleveland Independent hold		Swing		

=== Loftus ===
Loftus
Party	Candidate	Votes	%	±%
Labour	Eric Jackson	983		
East Cleveland Independent	Dave Fitzpatrick	684		
Independent	Mary Lanigan	668		
Independent	Linda Bell	620		
Labour	James McGill	620		
Independent	Allan Greening	517		
Labour	Jim Marvell	429		
Independent	Wayne Davies	404		
Conservative	Mary Dadd	259		
Turnout				
Labour hold		Swing		
East Cleveland Independent hold		Swing		
Independent hold		Swing		

=== Longbeck ===
Longbeck
Party	Candidate	Votes	%	±%
Liberal Democrats	Victoria Reyer	815		
Conservative	Norah Cooney	776		
Labour	Vic Jeffries	769		
Liberal Democrats	George Selmer	748		
Labour	Tom Hedges	717		
Labour	Denis Sewell	694		
Liberal Democrats	Thomas Wheatcroft	643		
Conservative	Vera Moody	583		
Conservative	John Moody	570		
Independent	Johnny Wilkinson	343		
Turnout				
Liberal Democrats gain from Independent		Swing		
Conservative hold		Swing		
Labour gain from Conservative		Swing		

=== Newcomen ===
Newcomen
Party	Candidate	Votes	%	±%
Liberal Democrats	Chris Abbott	781		
Liberal Democrats	Glynis Abbott	733		
Labour	Alan Wilkinson	442		
Labour	James Brown	393		
Conservative	Peter Storey	100		
Turnout				
Liberal Democrats hold		Swing		
Liberal Democrats hold		Swing		

=== Normanby ===
Normanby
Party	Candidate	Votes	%	±%
Labour	Billy Ayre	951		
Labour	Wendy Wall	852		
Labour	Carole Sims	822		
Eston Independent	Nigel King	635		
Eston Independent	Gaynor Spence	609		
Liberal Democrats	Tony Meir	607		
Eston Independent	Paul McInnes	597		
Liberal Democrats	Steven Abbott	580		
Liberal Democrats	Rod Tucker	545		
Conservative	Ann Croucher	251		
Turnout				
Labour hold		Swing		
Labour hold		Swing		
Labour hold		Swing		

=== Ormesby ===
Ormesby
Party	Candidate	Votes	%	±%
Liberal Democrats	Glyn Nightingale	1,090		
Liberal Democrats	Irene Nightingale	1,031		
Liberal Democrats	Ann Wilson	947		
Labour	Beryl Dunning	657		
Labour	Valerie Pickthall	601		
Labour	Robert Midgley	579		
Conservative	Richard Gibson	249		
Turnout				
Liberal Democrats hold		Swing		
Liberal Democrats hold		Swing		
Liberal Democrats hold		Swing		

=== St. Germain's ===
St. Germain's
Party	Candidate	Votes	%	±%
Labour	Tristan Learoyd	1,263		
Liberal Democrats	Marjorie Moses	1,054		
Labour	Sean Pryce	1,001		
Liberal Democrats	Lisa Rigg	998		
Labour	Marilyn Marshall	991		
Liberal Democrats	Margaret Wilson	921		
Independent	James Cooper	547		
Conservative	Jennifer Bell	359		
Turnout				
Labour gain from Liberal Democrats		Swing		
Liberal Democrats hold		Swing		
Labour gain from Liberal Democrats		Swing		

=== Saltburn ===
Saltburn
Party	Candidate	Votes	%	±%
Independent	Stuart Smith	1,235		
Conservative	Philip Thomson	962		
Labour	Joan Guy	718		
Conservative	Harry Lilleker	682		
Conservative	John Robinson	603		
Labour	Cyril Hammond	595		
Labour	Michael Dick	457		
Independent	Jim Wingham	457		
Liberal Democrats	Sarah Carr	216		
Liberal Democrats	Rebecca Selmer	97		
Liberal Democrats	Louise Hutchinson	88		
Turnout				
Independent gain from Conservative		Swing		
Conservative hold		Swing		
Labour gain from Conservative		Swing		

=== Skelton ===
Skelton
Party	Candidate	Votes	%	±%
Labour	Brian Briggs	1,238		
Labour	Dave McLuckie	921		
Labour	Helen McLuckie	876		
Conservative	James Carrolle	718		
Conservative	Mark Watts	657		
Liberal Democrats	Judith Carter	312		
Liberal Democrats	David Lundqvist	269		
Liberal Democrats	Norma Morris	248		
Turnout				
Labour hold		Swing		
Labour hold		Swing		
Labour hold		Swing		

=== South Bank ===
South Bank
Party	Candidate	Votes	%	±%
Labour	Ian Jeffrey	846		
Labour	Susan Jeffrey	791		
Labour	Sylvia Szintai	697		
Eston Independent	Sandra Smith	370		
Eston Independent	Sean Marston	346		
Liberal Democrats	Janet Jeffrey	300		
Eston Independent	Johnny Bassous	298		
Liberal Democrats	Maureen Benjelloun	220		
Liberal Democrats	Oz Sadiq	215		
Conservative	Sarah Dadd	94		
Turnout				
Labour hold		Swing		
Labour hold		Swing		
Labour hold		Swing		

=== Teesville ===
Teesville
Party	Candidate	Votes	%	±%
Labour	Sheelagh Clarke	1,219		
Labour	George Dunning	1,170		
Labour	Norman Pickthall	1,046		
Eston Independent	David Fisher	803		
Eston Independent	Jim Higgins	798		
Eston Independent	Pat Turner	736		
Conservative	Andrew Gilby	174		
Liberal Democrats	Jean Hutchinson	143		
Liberal Democrats	Ann Plummer	127		
Liberal Democrats	Kelly Seaman	102		
Turnout				
Labour hold		Swing		
Labour hold		Swing		
Labour hold		Swing		

=== West Dyke ===
West Dyke
Party	Candidate	Votes	%	±%
Liberal Democrats	Mike Carling	1,550		
Liberal Democrats	Mary Ovens	1,422		
Liberal Democrats	Kay Helm	1,371		
Labour	Adrian Elliot	707		
Labour	John Hawkins	622		
Labour	Catherine Learoyd	617		
Conservative	Stuart Bell	387		
Independent	Jane Thirlwall	271		
Turnout				
Liberal Democrats hold		Swing		
Liberal Democrats hold		Swing		
Liberal Democrats hold		Swing		

=== Westworth ===
Westworth
Party	Candidate	Votes	%	±%
Labour	David Williams	744		
Conservative	Carole Jeffrey	684		
Labour	Mary Burns	659		
Conservative	Malcolm Griffiths	607		
Liberal Democrats	Josh Mason	224		
Turnout				
Labour gain from East Cleveland Independent				
Conservative hold		Swing		

=== Zetland ===
Zetland
Party	Candidate	Votes	%	±%
Liberal Democrats	Jim Rogers	816		
Liberal Democrats	Ron Harrison	787		
Labour	Celia Elliott	578		
Labour	Norma Hensby	548		
Conservative	Philip Chisholm	238		
Conservative	Michael Bateman	216		
Turnout				
Liberal Democrats gain from Labour		Swing		
Liberal Democrats gain from Conservative		Swing		
