= Aberlady railway station =

Disused railway station in Aberlady, East Lothian

Aberlady
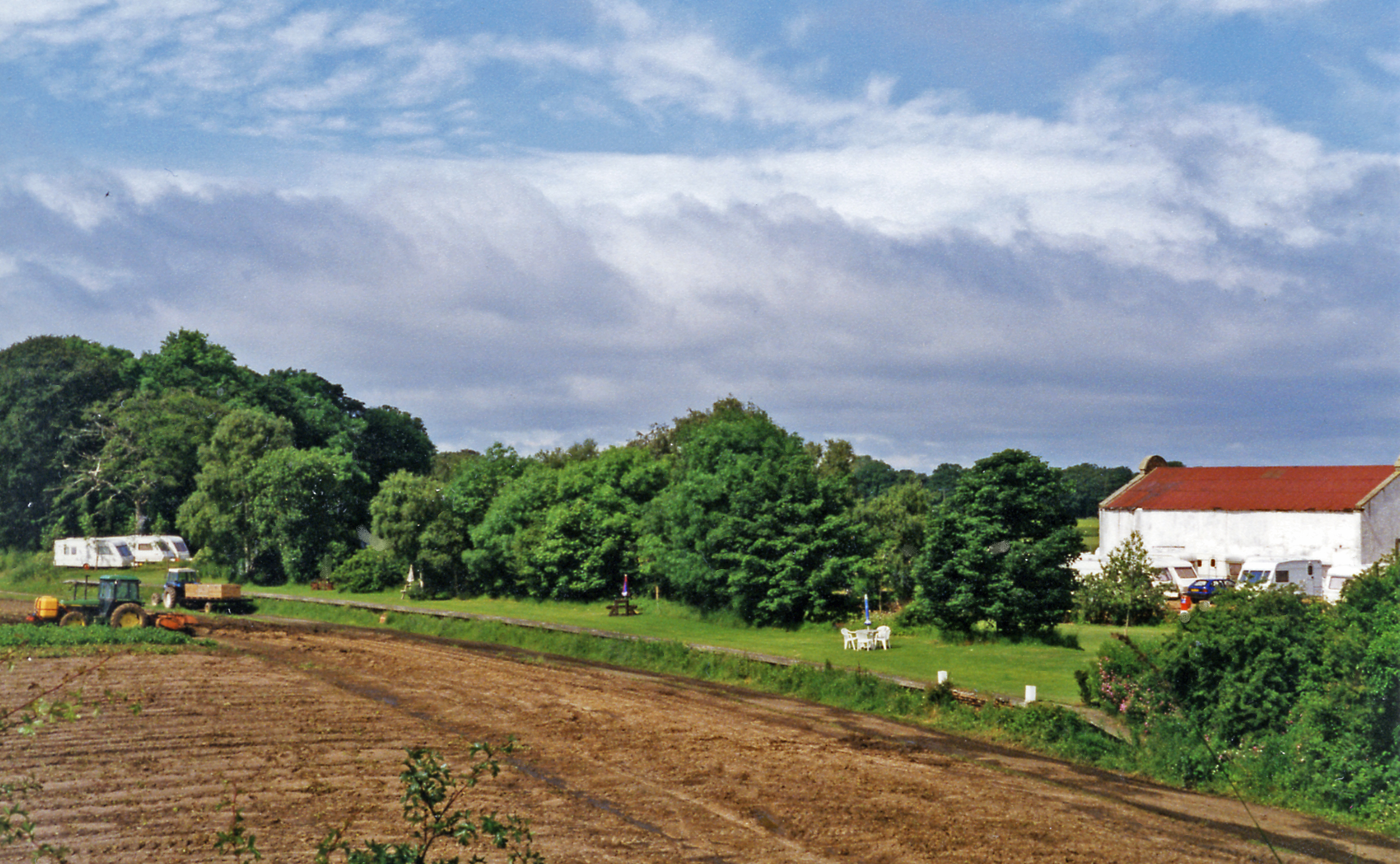
- Remains of Aberlady station (1997)

General information
- Location: Aberlady, East Lothian; Scotland
- Coordinates: 56.00388°N 2.85170°W
- Grid reference: NT469793
- Platforms: 1

Other information
- Status: Disused

History
- Original company: Aberlady, Gullane and North Berwick Railway
- Pre-grouping: North British Railway
- Post-grouping: London and North Eastern Railway

Key dates
- 1 April 1898: Opened
- 12 September 1932: Closed to passengers
- 15 June 1964: Line closes to freight
Location

Aberlady railway station served the village of Aberlady in Scotland. It was served by the Aberlady, Gullane and North Berwick railway. This line diverged from the East Coast Main Line at Aberlady Junction, east of the current Longniddry station.

== History ==
Opened on 1 April 1898 by the Aberlady, Gullane and North Berwick Railway when they opened the line between Aberlady junction (on the North British Railway between Dunbar and Edinburgh) and Gullane.

The station had one platform on the north side of a passing loop, there were two sidings behind the platform forming a goods yard able to accommodate most types of goods including live stock, it was equipped with a two and a half ton crane.

The line and station were absorbed by the North British Railway on 6 August 1900. Then station passed on to the London and North Eastern Railway (LNER) during the Grouping of 1923. That company then withdrew passenger services nine years later, although the line was still open to freight until 1964.

The station building was used as by the LNER as a camping apartment from 1935. The Scottish Region continued this use of the buildings, sometimes marketed as Camping Cottages in the 1950s and up to the line closing in 1964.

Despite being closed the station had been the location of a Camping coach in 1956, 1957 and from 1961 to 1964.

Preceding station	Historical railways	Following station
Luffness Platform; Line and Station closed	North British Railway; Aberlady, Gullane and North Berwick Railway	Longniddry; Line closed; Station open

== Sources ==
- Butt, R. V. J. (October 1995). The Directory of Railway Stations: details every public and private passenger station, halt, platform and stopping place, past and present (1st ed.). Sparkford: Patrick Stephens Ltd. ISBN 978-1-85260-508-7. OCLC 60251199. OL 11956311M.
- Grant, Donald J. (2017). Directory of the Railway Companies of Great Britain (1st ed.). Kibworth Beauchamp, Leicestershire: Troubador Publishing Ltd. ISBN 978-1-78803-768-6.
- McRae, Andrew (1997). British Railway Camping Coach Holidays: The 1930s & British Railways (London Midland Region). Vol. Scenes from the Past: 30 (Part One). Foxline. ISBN 1-870119-48-7.
- McRae, Andrew (1998). British Railways Camping Coach Holidays: A Tour of Britain in the 1950s and 1960s. Vol. Scenes from the Past: 30 (Part Two). Foxline. ISBN 1-870119-53-3.
- The Railway Clearing House (1970) [1904]. The Railway Clearing House Handbook of Railway Stations 1904 (1970 D&C Reprint ed.). Newton Abbot: David & Charles Reprints. ISBN 0-7153-5120-6.
