= Camping coach =

Converted railway coaches used for holidays

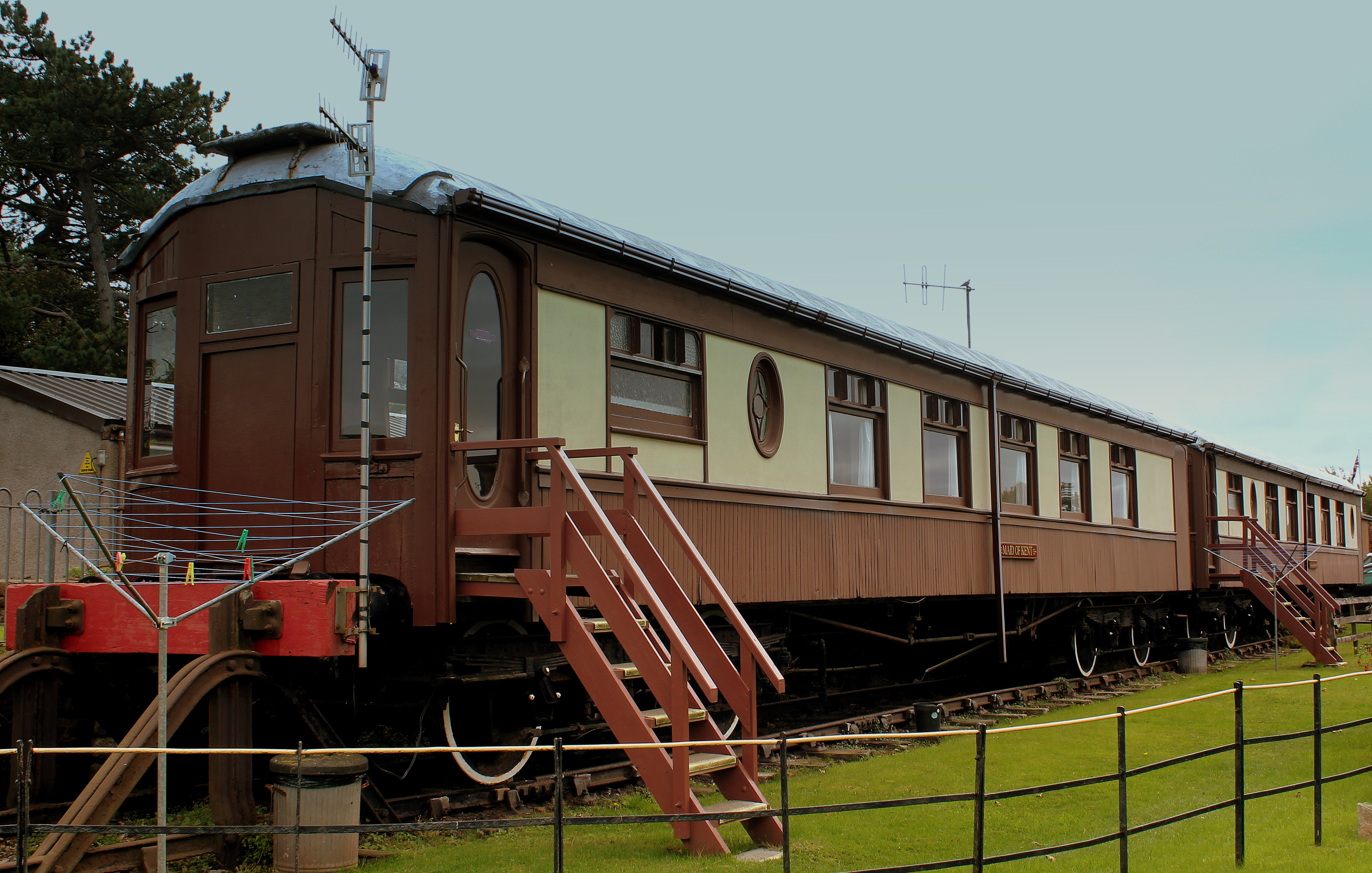
Camping coaches at Ravenglass

Camping coaches were holiday accommodation offered by many railway companies in the United Kingdom and the Republic of Ireland from the 1930s. The coaches were old passenger vehicles no longer suitable for use in trains, which were converted to provide sleeping and living space at static locations.

The charges for the use of these coaches were designed to encourage groups of people to travel by train to the stations where they were situated; they were also encouraged to make use of the railway to travel around the area during their holiday.

== History ==
Camping coaches were first introduced by the London and North Eastern Railway in 1933, when they positioned ten coaches in picturesque places around their network.

The following year, two other railway companies followed suit: the London, Midland and Scottish Railway, with what it originally called "caravans", and the Great Western Railway which called them "camp coaches". In 1935 they were introduced on the Southern Railway.

At the outset of the 1935 season there were 215 coaches at 162 sites through Great Britain. They proved popular and their numbers were steadily increased so that 1939 there were 439 coaches in use, more than half of which were situated on the London, Midland and Scottish Railway.

During World War II the coaches were generally unavailable to the public after 1940 as they were used by various authorities as emergency accommodation. By the end of the war most of the coaches needed refurbishment before they could be put back into public use; only the Southern Railway made this effort.

After the railways were nationalised a second generation of camping coaches was introduced from 1952 by British Railways, these vehicles were generally more up-to-date, spacious and better equipped. In the early 1960s the stock was enhanced by the conversion of some redundant Pullman coaches, and the service peaked at 223 vehicles in 1962.

The Beeching cuts brought an end to the service with a lot of smaller lines, where the coaches were often located, closing and coaches being scrapped. The last coaches available for public use were withdrawn at the end of the 1971 season.

Some camping coaches were conversions of vehicles that were no longer fit for operation and these remained static, in some instances "grounded" with running gear removed or on sections of track that were not connected to an operational line. Others retained the ability to be relocated to address operational requirements, which was possible because of the simplicity of the camping-style accommodation and because the running gear could be adequately maintained. Rail vehicles used for accommodation purposes today are generally not maintained in this way and are no longer compliant with current rail technical and safety standards. They may be adapted to a stationary configuration with e.g. mains water, electricity and sewage connections to meet modern comfort expectations and such modification renders them unfit for movement by rail.

== London and North Eastern Railway ==
The London and North Eastern Railway (LNER) first introduced camping coaches in 1933 and they converted 119 vehicles between then and 1938.

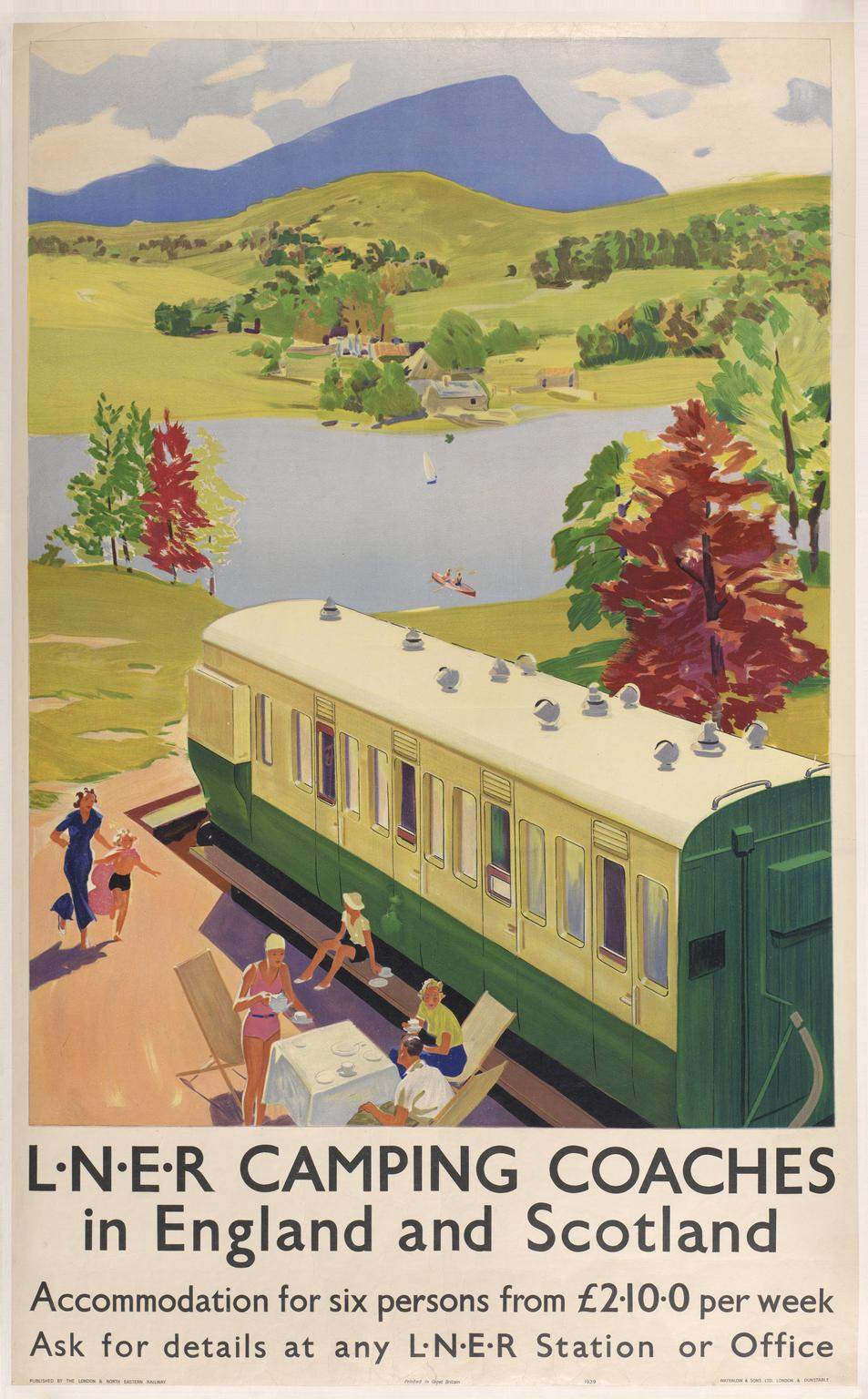
LNER Camping Coach Poster

=== LNER construction and layout ===
The vehicles selected for conversion were varied but there were several common characteristics. They were mostly five-compartment, six-wheel coaches of 1880s and 1890s vintage. Most of the fittings were stripped out of three of the compartments including the partitions between them to make a living room and kitchen area. The remaining two compartments remained for use as bedrooms, these had the seat backs removed, providing four berths, and were fitted with two upper berths in one of the compartments, providing an additional two berths for a total of six berths.

The first batch of 35 conversions for use in 1933 and 1934 lacked any means of interior access from the living room to the bedrooms, subsequent conversions were provided with an inside corridor and the early vehicles retrospectively modified in 1936. Space was found for the corridor by constructing the ends of the beds with a hinge, which could be turned back to permit passage through the doorway. Four other conversions were made, all to bogie equipped stock, 3 were converted into 8 berth camping coaches for use along the Norfolk coast and one became the Touring Camping Coach.

There were no mains services provided and campers were expected to use the station facilities for toilets and water. Paraffin was initially used for both cooking and lighting. Campers were expected to be self-sufficient during their stay.

The coaches proved immediately popular, 1,773 enquiries within a month and all ten coaches continuously occupied through July, August and September.

=== LNER locations ===
In both of the 1933 and 1934 seasons it was possible to book a camping coach and have it positioned at a station of your choice (within certain criteria) along a branch line, in some circumstances it was possible to have your coach moved during the course of your stay from one station to another. This practice was discontinued from 1935 when the advertised locations of the coaches were considered to be fixed for the season.

In 1933 coaches were located at Alston, Bowes, Glaisdale, Pateley Bridge and Staintondale.

The remaining five coaches could be positioned at any of:

- Askrigg, Aysgarth or Wensley on the Hawes branch of the former North Eastern Railway (NER).
- Cliburn, Kirkby Thore or Warcop on the Eden Valley branch of the former NER.
- Goathland or Levisham on the former Whitby and Pickering Railway part of the former NER.
- Sandsend or Staithes on the former Whitby, Redcar and Middlesbrough Union Railway part of the former NER.
- Whittingham on the Cornhill Branch of the former NER.

It was more complicated in 1934, a further 25 coaches were available bringing the total to 35. The LNER decided to allow its customers to decide where they wanted their coach to be positioned, from a range of 82 stations on 29 different branch lines throughout its operational areas in England and Scotland.

From 1935 the coaches were all advertised as being at fixed sites, there was usually only one coach per site, occasionally two and three at three sites, Robin Hood's Bay, Cloughton and Sandsend East Row. In addition to the sites listed above the following stations had one or more camping coaches for at least one season between 1935 and 1939, a full listing with numbers is available at McRae (1997):

- England:
  Barras, Barrasford, Brampton, Brightlingsea, Carnaby, Castleton, Coltishall, Corton, Coxwold, Dacre, Danby, Dersingham, Flamborough, Forge Valley, Frosterley, Gaisgill, Helmsley, Hopton, Humshaugh, Kettleness, Kirbymoorside, Lealholm, Lowestoft North, Ravenscar, Ravenstonedale, Ripley Valley, Romaldkirk, St John's Chapel, Seacroft, Snettisham, Southminster, Stanhope, Tarset, Theddlethorpe, Thornton Dale, Twizell, Velvet Hall, Wearhead and Woodhall Junction. The 8 berth bogie stock camping coaches on the Norfolk coast were located at Mundesley-on-Sea, Overstrand and Trimingham.
- Scotland:
  Aberfoyle, Aberlour, Aboyne, Ardlui, Arisaig, Arrochar & Tarbet, Ballater, Banchory, Banavie, Boarhills, Bridge of Orchy, Burnmouth, Calcots, Cambus O'May, Cardrona, Cauldcots, Corpach, Crathes, Crianlarich, Cromdale, Culross, Dandaleith, Dumgoyne, Fountainhall, Garelochhead, Garmouth, Glassaugh, Glenfarg, Glenfinnan, Inverkeilor, Killearn, Kilmany, Locheilside, Luthrie, Morar, Murtle, Portessie, Portsoy, Rannoch, Rhu, Roy Bridge, St Cyrus, Shandon, Spean Bridge, Spey Bay, Sprouston, Tochieneal, Torphins, Torryburn, Tulloch, Tyndrum and Whistlefield.

Some of the stations hosting camping coaches had been closed to passenger traffic before the coaches were located there and the railways made alternative arrangements to get campers to the coaches, sometimes this was by bus from a nearby staffed station, occasionally an unscheduled stop was made by a local train.

=== Touring camping coach ===
The LNER introduced a Touring Camping Coach in 1935, this service enabled campers to undertake a 276 miles (444 km) week-long tour of the Yorkshire Dales from York. The coach was moved from place to place in the evenings by attaching it to scheduled passenger services, initially the coach visited Pateley Bridge, Aysgarth, Barnard Castle, Glaisdale and Coxwold, the route was later simplified and only went to Pateley Bridge, Aysgarth and Glaisdale.

The vehicle was a conversion of a bogie carriage from 1905 and had a living/dining room with kitchenette and six one-person sleeping compartments, a toilet and a seventh compartment could be used as a bathroom, store or an extra sleeping compartment utilising a collapsible camp bed. As with the static camping coaches campers were expected to provide their own provisions. The whole coach had to be booked for the week with a minimum of 6 campers, the cost was £2 per person out-of-season and £2.10s during July, August and September. (Note: £2 and £2 10s would be approximately £136.40 and £170.50 in 2018)

Out of season it was possible to hire the touring coach with different itineraries.

=== Camping apartments ===
The LNER converted some station buildings for use as Camping Apartments, they were similar in idea to the camping coaches and were a way of utilising the buildings at stations were passenger services had been withdrawn. Initially, in 1935, nine apartments were made available at Castle Howard, Clifton Moor (unusually this station still had a passenger service), Akeld, Kirknewton, Gullane, Aberlady, Gairlochy, Invergarry and Fort Augustus. The apartments were mainly for six people but some were able to offer accommodation to smaller parties.

=== Coronation week 1937 on the LNER ===
Camping coaches were used during coronation week in 1937 when fifty two vehicles were moved to the London area to provide accommodation for parties wishing to witness the coronation. The coaches were located at High Barnet, Totteridge & Whetstone, Woodside Park, Wembley Hill, Sudbury Hill, Loughton, Chigwell Lane, Theydon Bois, Epping, Fairlop, Grange Hill and Harold Wood. The rental conditions were very similar, six return tickets (on the LNER of course) from home to London, and an increased rental charge of £10 for the coach. (Note: £10 would be approximately £635 in 2018)

== London, Midland and Scottish Railway ==
The London, Midland and Scottish Railway (LMS) introduced camping caravans in 1934 after they had seen the success of the LNER scheme. They converted 42 vehicles for use in 1934 and more each year reaching a total of 232 vehicles by the outbreak of World War II.

=== LMSR construction and layout ===
The accommodation provided by the LMS was similar to that of the LNER, except that the LMS used redundant bogie coaches with corridors from the start. The LMS laid their conversions out a little differently in that they maintained three compartments as bedrooms each with two beds that were positioned along the length of the coach, they were able to do this and still provide a reasonable sized living/dining room because of the longer coaches they used.

Some smaller 6-wheeled coaches were converted to 4-berth caravans for use on the Northern Counties Committee system in Northern Ireland, an initial batch of 8 was converted for the 1935 season and 25 altogether before the war.

=== LMSR locations ===
The LMS positioned its caravans in different ways, some were sited as individuals, quite a few as a pair or three together but they also established colonies of them with the coaches sited in large concentrations, this sometimes meant they needed to construct facilities for the campers as the vehicles had no toilets or other mains facilities.

All of the initial locations (number of caravans in brackets) used during 1934 were in England: Alsop en le Dale (1), Beckford (1), Bolton Abbey (1), Braithwaite (6), Coalport (1), Coniston (3), Hassop (1), Hathersage (2), Heysham (3), Ingleton (3), Knott End (4), Thorpe Cloud (1), Torver (1) and Whalley (1).

Over the years 1935-1939 the following locations were used for at least one season, a full listing with numbers is available at McRae (1997):

- England:
  Alsop en le Dale (1), Bakewell (1), Beckford (1), Blackpool Squires Gate (12-17), Bolton Abbey (1), Bootle (1), Braithwaite (6-8), Braystones (4), Coalport (1), Coniston (3), Darley Dale (1), Edale (2), Grindleford (2), Hassop (1), Hathersage (2), Heysham (3-36), Ingleton (2-4), Knott End (4-5), Lytham (5-13), Malvern Wells (2), Nethertown (6), Thorpe Cloud (1), Torver (1) and Whalley (1).
- Scotland:
  Aberfeldy (1), Abington (1), Allanfearn (1), Alloway (2), Appin (2), Beauly (1), Benderloch (1-2), Biggar (1), Bunchrew (1), Burghead (2), Comrie (1-2), Creagan (1-2), Currie (1), Dalbeattie (1), Dunkeld (1-2), Fortrose (2), Golspie (1), Grantown-on-Spey (2-3), Guay (1), Hopeman (1-3), Kentallen (1-2), Kildary (1), Kincraig (1), Kingussie (1-2), Kyle of Lochalsh (1-2), Lochearnhead (1-2), Lybster (1), Lyne(1), Montrose (1-3), Muchalls (1), Portpatrick (1-2), St Fillans(2), Strathaven(1), (Note: The reference does not record if the coach was located at Strathaven Central or Strathaven North) Strathyre (1-2) and Stromeferry (1).
- Wales:
  Aber (1-4), Abergele (2-3), Bethesda (3-4), Brynkir (1), Conway Morfa (18-30), Dyserth (2), Gronant, near Prestatyn (12), Llanberis (1), Llangammarch Wells (1), Nantclwyd (1), Pont-y-Pant (1-2), Rhuddlan (1), Roman Bridge (2), Talacre (2-9) and Tregarth (2).
- Northern Ireland:
  Antrim (1), Ballycarry (1), Ballycastle (1-4), Bellarena (1), Castlerock (1-5), Downhill (1-2), Magilligan (1), Port Stewart (1-5), Toome (1) and Whitehead (1-8).

=== Coronation week 1937 on the LMS ===
Caravans were relocated during coronation week in 1937 when around fifty vehicles were moved to the London area to provide accommodation for parties wishing to witness the coronation. In the usual LMS way they were sited in colonies, the final disposition of the coaches is uncertain but they were planned to be at Watford North Goods Yard, Rickmansworth, Croxley Green and possibly St Albans Abbey. The LMS had also proposed providing additional porters to assist the campers.

== Great Western Railway ==
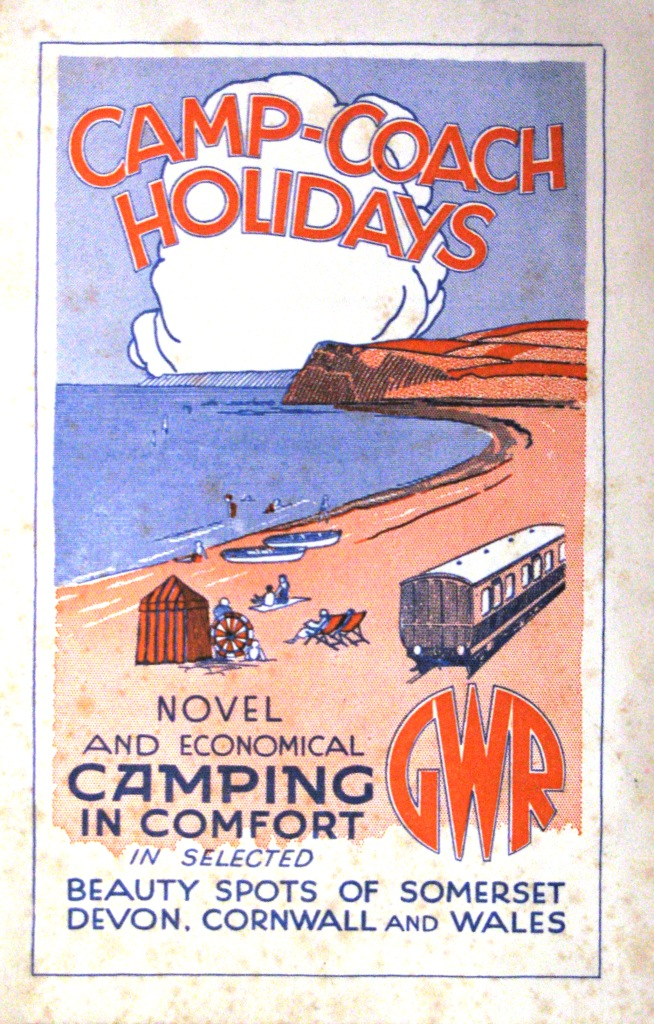
A 1934 GWR brochure

In a similar way to the LMS the Great Western Railway (GWR) introduced their camp coach holidays scheme in 1934 after they had seen the initial success of the LNER scheme. They converted 19 vehicles for use in 1934 and more each year reaching a total of 65 vehicles by the outbreak of World War II.

=== GWR construction and layout ===
17 of the 19 initial coach conversions were very similar to the LNER camping coaches, they were conversions of redundant 31 feet (9.4 m) 6-wheel carriage stock, the conversion resulted in two bedrooms, one with two berths and the other with four all running across the coach. There was no internal corridor, toilet or plumbing. The 18th conversion was similar but the donor coach had been a suburban four-wheeler with a lower ceiling and was slightly shorter at 28 feet (8.5 m).

The 19th conversion was different, it was based on a 46 feet 6 inches (14.17 m) long former slip coach. This camp coach had ten berths by the provision of an additional four-berth compartment.

Subsequent conversions were made to a variety of 4, 6 and 8 wheel vehicles including some that had been built as convertible for the broad or standard gauge, this variety meant that the GWR was able to offer camp coaches of different sizes. They allocated coaches to either type A, B, C or D:

- Type A, 20 in total, were 6 berth with the kitchen and dining/living room in the centre.
- Type B, 18 in total, were 6 berth with the kitchen and dining/living room at one end and the sleeping compartments at the other.
- Type C, 26 in total, were 8 berth with the kitchen and dining/living room in the centre, one 2 berth sleeping compartment at one end and a two and four berth compartment at the other.
- Type D was the only 10 berth coach.

All the later, after 1934, conversions were made with internal corridors and the berths running along the length of the coach, the original conversions had a corridor retro-fitted by 1937.

=== GWR locations ===
The GWR instituted a one coach per site policy, trying to obtain an air of 'privacy and exclusivity'. Local staff were expected to go out of their way to assist campers, providing advice and assistance.

The camp coach locations in 1934 were:

- England: Ashton, Avonwick, Blue Anchor, Fowey, Gara Bridge, Loddiswell, Lustleigh, Penryn, Princetown and St Agnes.
- Wales: Aberayron, Barmouth Junction, Borth, Bow Street, Dinas Mawddwy, Dyffryn-on-Sea, Llanfyllin, Rhayader and Talsarnau.

The following sites were used between 1935 and 1939, full lists are available at McRae (1997) and Fenton (1999) (who also provides much more detail of each site):

- England: Abbotsbury, Arley (1938 only), Ashton, Avonwick, Axbridge, Bampton, Blagdon (station had closed in 1931, line was open for freight) Blue Anchor, Bourton-on-the-Water, Brent Knoll, Bridport West Bay, Cheddar, Chudleigh (1939 only), Churston (1939 only), Congresbury, Dawlish Warren, East Anstey, Fowey, Gara Bridge, Hampton Loade, Ide, Kerne Bridge, Lelant (1939 only), Linley (1938 only), Loddiswell, Lodge Hill, Lustleigh, Luxulyan, Marazion, Newent, Penryn, Perranwell, Portesham, Powerstock, Princetown, St Agnes, Stogumber, Thorverton, Tintern, Upwey, Wargrave, Winscombe and Wookey.
- Wales: Aberayron, Aberdovey (1939 only), Abererch, Afon Wen, Barmouth Junction, Borth, Bow Street, Conwil (1939 only), Dinas Mawddwy, Dolgelley, Dyffryn-on-Sea, Erwood, Fairbourne, Ferryside, Llanfyllin, Llangollen, Llanilar, Llwyngwril, Manorbier, Newbridge on Wye, Presteign, Rhayader, Saundersfoot (1939 only), Strata Florida, Talsarnau, Towyn and Trawscoed.

=== Coronation week 1937 on the GWR ===
Camp coaches were used during coronation week in 1937 when some eight berth vehicles were moved to Henley-on-Thames and Wargrave in the London area to provide accommodation for parties wishing to witness the coronation. The coaches were let at twice the normal hire rate for the week.

== Southern Railway ==
The Southern Railway (SR) introduced camping coaches from the summer of 1935, they had fewer vehicles available compared to the others of the Big Four companies with a total of 24 coaches in use by 1939. They participated in the provision of accommodation for Coronation week by locating some camping coaches at Tattenham Corner. The Southern Railway restored camping coach facilities at several holiday sites in Devon and Cornwall in 1947. They were able to use 21 of the original 24 coaches, and converted three more to replace the lost ones.

=== SR construction and layout ===
The 24 Southern Camping Coaches were in two batches of 12:

- The first batch were all converted from former London, Chatham and Dover Railway six-wheel stock of 1887-1897 vintage at the end of 1934. They were similar in style to the second batch of LNER coaches with two sleeping compartments and an internal corridor. They differed in that the sleeping compartments were designed so that one had two lower berths and the other had two lower berths with one upper berth, the sixth bed was located in the living area. Other differences were that the coaches were provided with running water, fed by a pump from a 50 imperial gallons (230 L; 60 US gal) tank fixed under the coach.
- The second batch were converted from former London and South Western Railway bogie stock between 1936 and 1938. These coaches had similar fixtures and fittings as the first batch and despite being longer they were still designed for six people.

=== SR locations ===
In 1935 the SR located the first batch of 12 camping coaches at eight sites: Brentor, Bridestowe, Gunnislake, Hurn, Newton Poppleford, Otterham, Umberleigh and Woodbury Road. The SR charged £2 10s 0d during April to June and £3 10s 0d during July to September but it was also necessary for campers to purchase at least four monthly return tickets to the coaches and the SR deliberately selected sites that would provide additional income from these ticket fares. (Note: £2 10s 0d and £3 10s 0d would be approximately £170.50 and £238.60 in 2018)

In the following years coaches were located at the following additional sites for at least part of one season, only Hurn was used just in 1935, a full list is available at McRae (1997): Amberley, Ardingly, Bere Ferrers, East Budleigh, East Farleigh, Hinton Admiral, Littleham, Lyndhurst Road, Martin Mill, Newick & Chailey, Newington, Port Isaac Road, Sandling Junction, Selling, South Molton Road and Wool.

In 1938 the SR instituted a policy of moving some of the coaches in the middle of the season, presumably to offer more choice to campers, this experiment was not repeated.

== Wartime ==
The government took control of the railways during World War II, exercising that control through the Railway Executive Committee (REC). The REC controlled the use of camping coaches throughout the war initially determining that they should be available for when circumstances required the provision of emergency quarters. In 1940, the first summer season after the war's start about half of the camping coaches were still available to the general public, around 200 vehicles were pressed into war service.

By the end of 1940 the REC determined that camping coaches would be retained for housing railway staff made homeless by enemy action or as lodgings for those transferred away from home. Despite this decision there were numerous demands for use of the coaches some of which were fulfilled, such as at Malmesbury land reclamation scheme in Wiltshire and the construction of the emergency port at Cairnryan Harbour.

== British Railways ==
After the war the railways eventually reclaimed their camping coaches but they were mostly in very poor condition and either relegated to departmental duties or scrapped. Apart from on the Southern Railway camping coaches did not reappear across the network until after nationalisation when British Railways (BR) re-introduced them in the summer of 1952.

Each region of BR effectively managed its own scheme although there was some all-region publicity during the peak years of camping coach provision.

=== Pullman Holiday Coaches ===
During the early 1960s a fleet of Pullman coaches became available as the Kent coast lines were electrified under the Modernisation and Re-Equipment Plan published in December 1954. Between 1960 and 1964 a total of 57 coaches were converted and distributed around the regions.

The converted Pullman coaches were provided with 6 berths distributed in three bedrooms. The master bedroom at the end of the corridor ran the full width of the carriage and had two single beds either side of the room. The other two bedrooms were reached from the corridor but were the width of the corridor narrower, they were provided with bunk beds, some of the kitchen and living rooms ran full width but some had a side corridor restricting them.

The coaches were distributed as follows:

ER	11
LMR	3	(it was 4 altogether, one was withdrawn in 1964 and another only introduced in 1964)
ScR	12
SR	25
WR	6

The locations and numbers of Pullman coaches are included in the details below, except where noted.

=== North Eastern Region ===
The North Eastern Region (NER) had camping coaches available from 1952 until 1964. An initial batch of 15 6-berth coach conversions were done at York in time for the summer of 1952. The donor coaches were 54 feet (16 m) long former GER 10 compartment third class coaches. Their initial locations in 1952 and 1953 are not confirmed. A further five conversions also into 6-berth coaches were made for the 1954 season, these were based on 54 feet (16 m) long former GER suburban non-corridor brake third coaches.

In 1954 the 20 coaches were located at (number of coaches in 1954 in brackets):Bolton Abbey(1), Cloughton (2), Goathland (1), Kettleness (1), Ravenscar (2), Robin Hood's Bay (3), Sandsend (3), Sandsend East Row (3), Scalby (2), Stainton Dale (1) and Staithes (1). The coaches remained in much the same locations throughout, both Sandsend, Kettleness and Staithes sites closed after the 1958 season when the Loftus to Whitby (West Cliff) line closed. Cloughton station gained a coach and new sites were opened in 1959 at Grosmont (2), Hornsea (2), Newbiggin-by-the-Sea (1) and Ruswarp (1).

Two further conversions were done for NER, these comprised two former GCR 60 feet (18 m) long coaches and they were each converted to two 4-berth camping coaches, each coach with access from one end of the vehicle. These latter two vehicles were described in the literature as each being two camping coaches leading to some confusion in the numbers of coaches and they were probably available from 1956. One was located at Robin Hood's Bay and the other at Scalby.

The coaches at Robin Hood's Bay and Scalby were the only coaches outside of the Southern Region to be provided with electricity.

==== Camping Cottages ====
After the war the NER re-used four of the former LNER apartments changing their name to Camping Cottages, they were at Castle Howard, Clifton Moor, Akeld and Kirknewton. The NER provided additional accommodation in converted buildings at another eight stations at Allendale, Staward (both only for a few years until the branch from Hexham closed), Brinkburn, Middleton-in-Teesdale, Ampleforth, Hampsthwaite, Hayburn Wyke and Scalby complementing the coaches situated there. The buildings remained in use until the 1960s and were closed when the camping coach services were withdrawn from those lines.

=== Eastern Region ===
The Eastern Region (ER) had camping coaches available from 1952 until 1965. An initial batch of 10 6-berth coach conversions were done at Doncaster in time for the summer of 1952. The donor coaches were 54 feet (16 m) long former GER coaches, a mixture of 10 compartment third class and suburban non-corridor brake third coaches. Between 1952 and 1954 these coaches (number of coaches in brackets) were located at: Corton (1), Felixstowe Pier (2), Hopton-on-Sea (1), Lowestoft North (1), Mundesley-on-Sea (2 in 1952, then 4), Oulton Broad South (1) and Overstrand (2 in 1952 only).

A further 5 conversions of 54 feet (16 m) long former GER coaches were completed in time for the 1955 season, these were positioned at existing sites so that Corton now had 2, Felixstowe Pier 4, Hopton-on-Sea 2 and Oulton Broad South 2. The numbers stayed like this until 1959 when an additional 6 conversions were made available, 5 of these were on former GNR 61 feet 6 inches (18.75 m) stock, the sixth being somewhat shorter at 53 feet 6 inches (16.31 m), all 6 were situated at Mundesley-on-Sea for 1959.

The ER placed its allocation of four Pullman coaches in 1960 in new locations, 3 went to Felixstowe Town and one to Heacham, after this they started to replace their normal camping coaches with Pullmans as they became available, by their last season of 1965 they had replaced all but nine vehicles.

=== London Midland Region ===
The London Midland Region (LMR) had camping coaches available from 1952 until 1971. Two initial batches each of 12 6-berth coach conversions were completed, one batch at each of Derby and Wolverton works, in time for the summer of 1952. The donor coaches were mostly former 57 feet (17 m) LNWR stock of 1906 - 1920 vintage. The locations of these initial coaches is uncertain for the years 1952 and 1953. A further batch of 17 similar conversions were available for the 1954 season and the 41 coaches available at this time were at (number of coaches in brackets):Aber (1), Abergele (8), Bakewell (1), Bassenthwaite Lake (1), Squires Gate (15), Brynkir (1), Coniston (2), Edale (1), Embleton (2), Glan Conwy (1), Grange-over-Sands (2), Hathersage (1), Llanberis (2), Pont-y-Pant (1), Roman Bridge (1) and Thorpe Cloud (1).

Over the period 1955 to 1959 the sites and number of coaches at each site varied, some stopped being used and others started, approximately another 10 coaches were converted, and it is likely a few were withdrawn so the picture in 1959 looked like:Aber (1), Abergele (9), Bakewell (1), Bassenthwaite Lake (1), Betws-y-Coed (1), Squires Gate (15), Braithwaite (1), Darley Dale (1), Glan Conwy (1), Grange-over-Sands (2), Lakeside (2),Llanberis (1), Ravenglass (2), Rhuddlan (4), Seascale (1), and Silloth (4). In 1960 two other sites were taken in to use Hest Bank (4-5) and Llanfairfechan (1).

In 1963 a boundary change to BR regions transferred the Cambrian coast line from the WR to the LMR and the coaches located there came under LMR control, the existing coaches were replaced by LMR vehicles from 1965, these were located at:Aberdovey (3), Barmouth Junction (2), Borth (1), Fairbourne (1) and Llwyngwril (1).

The LMR installed Calor gas in the coaches for heating, lighting and cooking although this wasn't included in the hire cost but was available locally, usually from the stationmaster, at moderate cost.

=== Scottish Region ===
The Scottish Region (ScR) inherited sites from both the LMS and the LNER, it had up to 47 coaches available from 1952 to 1969. The coaches were converted in batches, the first batch of 10 conversions, done at St Rollox in 1952, being similar to LMR conversions made on former LNWR stock of 1906 to 1915 vintage. Most of the remaining conversions, done between 1953 and 1957 were mostly made to former Caledonian Railway 57 feet (17 m) stock, there were a few conversions of shorter coaches.

They were all 6 berth coach conversions and were sited mainly as individual coaches as they became available, only 10 in 1952, reaching a peak of 47 in 1962 where they were located at:Aberfeldy, Aberlady, Allanfearn, Appin, Arisaig, Barnhill, Benderloch, Burghead, Callander, Carnoustie, Carr Bridge, Comrie, Corpach, Creagan, Elie, Fairlie High, Glenfinnan, Golspie, Grantown-on-Spey, (Note: The reference does not record if the coach was located at Grantown-on-Spey West or Grantown-on-Spey East, though the LMS coach was located at West) Gullane, Inverkip, Kentallen, Killiecrankie, Killin, Kingussie, Lochailhort, Lundin Links, Monifieth, Morar, North Berwick, Plockton, Portessie, Portsoy, Roy Bridge, St Cyrus, St. Monance, Spean Bridge, Strathyre, Strome Ferry, Tyndrum Lower and Wemyss Bay.

Other sites were used including:Aberdour (1957 only), Aberlour (1954-1955), Aboyne (1954-1960), Ardlui (1964-1966), Arrochar & Tarbet (1964-1969), Cardross (1964 only), Cromdale (1954-1955), Eddleston (1952-1961), Fortrose (1953-1959), Fountainhall (1958-1960), Garelochhead (1964-1967), Kinghorn (1964 only), Loch Awe (1952-1960), Lochmaben (1956-1961), Newtonmore (1964-1967), Rhu (1954-1956), St Combs (1956-1959) and West Kilbride (1954-1957 and 1964-1967).

Up until 1962 the ScR returned most of its coaches at the end of each season to St Rollox for refurbishment and they were then moved to three sites for storage over the winter, the former carriage shed at Aviemore, Sighthill carriage sidings in Glasgow and at Ballater. In 1963 they instituted a system of on-site inspection and maintenance in order to reduce the number of coach movements, from then on coaches were gradually removed from service as they declined.

Whilst the rental system was the same on the ScR as it was elsewhere, there was a charge for the coaches rental plus a minimum number of return tickets to the coach location, they did allow a number of weeks at the start and end of the season when railway employees could use their concessionary travel passes.

==== Camping Apartments ====
The ScR also continued with the LNER camping apartments scheme including using two of the original apartments at Aberlady and Gullane. Apartments were provided at: Cairneyhill, Culross, Torryburn, Kilmany, Whitehouse, Old Meldrum, Lochearnhead (the only one which was a former LMS station), Macduff and Banchory (the only one which had a passenger train service!).

=== Southern Region ===
The Southern Region (SR) had camping coaches available from 1948 until 1967. The Southern Railway had been the only pre-nationalisation company to re-introduce them after the war, see above. The early days of nationalisation, 1948–1953, saw the SR continuing to use the pre-war stock, together with the three replacements, where they were all located is unknown but there were some located at the following stations for at least one year :Corfe Castle, East Budleigh, Hinton Admiral, Newton Poppleford, Otterham, Port Isaac Road, Tipton St Johns, Umberleigh, Whitstone and Bridgerule, Woodbury Road and Wrafton.

The SR converted two more coaches in 1948 and then a further batch of 10 in 1953 mainly from 56 feet (17 m) former LSWR stock, giving a maximum of 36 (plus the three lost during the war years). The pre-war 6-wheel stock was withdrawn at the end of the 1953 season when it was replaced by the new batch.

In addition to the early sites the SR had coaches located, for at least one year, at: Amberley, Bere Ferrers, Combpyne, Littleham, Lyndhurst Road, Martin Mill, Sandling for Hythe, Sway, Wool and Yalding.

The SR made the most use of the later Pullmans holiday coaches using them to gradually replace the older stock, they did introduce them to some new sites at Birchington-on-Sea, Bosham and Walmer.

=== Western Region ===
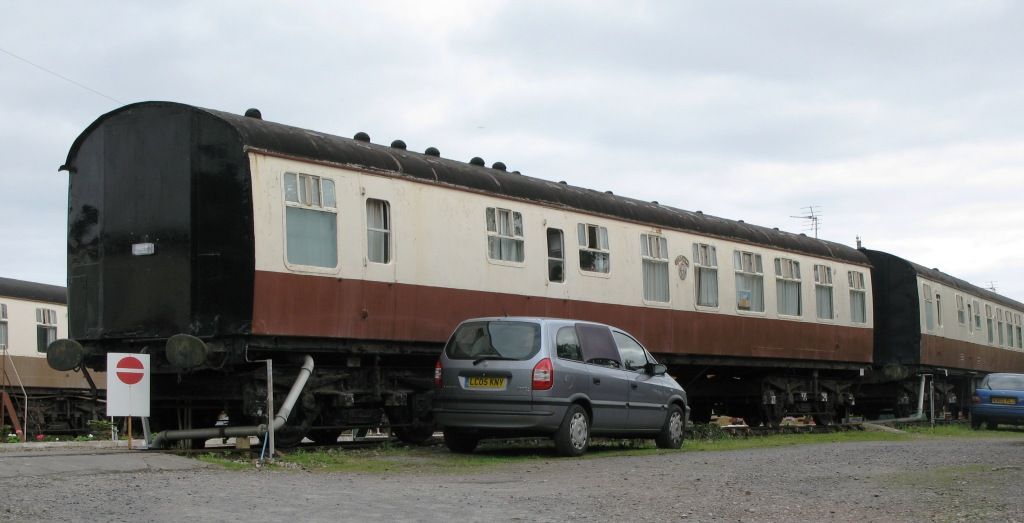
Camping coaches at Dawlish Warren

The Western Region (WR) had camping coaches available from 1952 until 1964. An initial batch of 30 8-berth coach conversions were completed by the summer of 1952. The donor coaches were bogie stock mostly around 56 feet (17 m) long of 1900-1922 vintage.

The layout of the vehicles was with a kitchen at one end, then a partial partition to a living/dining room, both of which were full width, then a corridor leading to three bedrooms with beds laid out across the vehicle, one 4-berth and two 2-berth cabins, one of the beds in the 4-berth cabin was moveable and could be placed elsewhere.

This initial batch were individually sited in 1952 at:

- England: Ashton, Avonwick, Bampton, Blue Anchor, Cheddar, Congresbury, Dawlish Warren, East Anstey, Fowey, Kerne Bridge, Loddiswell, Lodge Hill, Lustleigh, Luxulyan, Marazion, Perranwell, St Agnes, Stogumber, Wells (Note: The reference does not record if the coach was located at Wells (Tucker Street), Wells (Priory Road) or Wells East Somerset) and Winscombe.
- Wales: Aberayron, Aberdovey, Abererch, Borth, Bow Street, Dolgelly, Ferryside, Llanilar, Manorbier and Talsarnau.

These sites were added in 1953 and 1954 (not all sites in use all the time, McRae (1998) contains a comprehensive list: Arthog, Fairbourne, Llwyngwril, St Erth, Shepherds, Symonds Yat and Wargrave.

Five more conversions were made in 1954, ten in 1956, five in 1957 and a final ten in 1958, making 60 in all. In 1956 the WR changed its policy on one coach per site and started to position multiple coaches at some sites.

1960 was a peak year for the WR and their coaches were deployed as follows, one coach per site unless noted:

- England: Blue Anchor (2), Bourne End, Buckfastleigh, Cheddar, Congresbury, Dawlish Warren (8), Fowey, Gara Bridge (2), Loddiswell (2), Luxulyan, Marazion, Nancegollan, Perranwell, St Agnes (2), St Erth, St Ives (2), Shepherds, Shiplake, Stogumber, Tintern, Wargrave and Wells.
- Wales: Aberayron (2), Aberdovey (3), Abererch, Arthog, Barmouth Junction, Borth, Carrog, Dolgelly, Dyffryn Ardudwy, Fairbourne, Ferryside, Glandyfi, Lavernock, Llanilar, Llanrhystyd Road, Llwyngwril, Manorbier, Penally, Saundersfoot, Sully and Talsarnau.

There were other sites used for some years that are not in the above lists, they are: Chudleigh, Falmouth, Henley-on-Thames, Limpley Stoke, Roche, St Columb Road, Symonds Yat and Yealmpton in England and Tenby in Wales.

All the coaches were 8 berth except for three, in 1964 two coaches at Fowey and one at Perranwell were 6 berth conversions on former LSWR stock.

In 1963 the WR received 6 Pullman holiday coaches, it deployed two to Fowey were they stayed for just the one season before being replaced and then sent to Marazion where they joined the four other Pullman coaches which had been there since 1963.

The WR stopped provision of camping coaches to the public after the end of the 1964 season. An arrangement was agreed with the Western Region Staff Association to continue a camping coach service using the colony of 9 coaches at Dawlish Warren, these vehicles were mainly 1957/58 conversions and still had some useful life left in them. These coaches remained in use until 1980/81 and proved to be so successful that they were replaced with new conversions between 1981 and 1983, some of which were still being used in 1997. Seven of these later conversions were mainly 8 berth conversions of former BR Mark 1 restaurant/buffet cars but two of them were 6 berth conversions of former LMS engineers saloons.

The Western Region Staff Association also took control of the six Pullman coaches at Marazion which despite the station closing to passengers and goods, in 1964 and 1965 respectively, the line remains open. The coaches were in use into the 1970s before being sold privately in 1984.

== Córas Iompair Éireann ==
The Córas Iompair Éireann (CIÉ) had eight "Holiday Camping Coaches" in service between 1959 and 1967. Early in 1968 the camping coaches were withdrawn.

=== CIÉ locations ===
In 1959 the CIÉ located the first batch of six camping coaches (HC1-HC6) at three sites: Dungarvan, Killarney and Carrick-on-Shannon. Apparently the season was successful and two more coaches were converted for the 1960 season, for Tramore (HC7-HC8). The two at Carrick-on-Shannon were transferred to Galway.

== Ulster Transport Authority ==
The Ulster Transport Authority (UTA) in Northern Ireland also had two camping coaches in operation in Ballycastle in the 1960s.

== Publicity ==
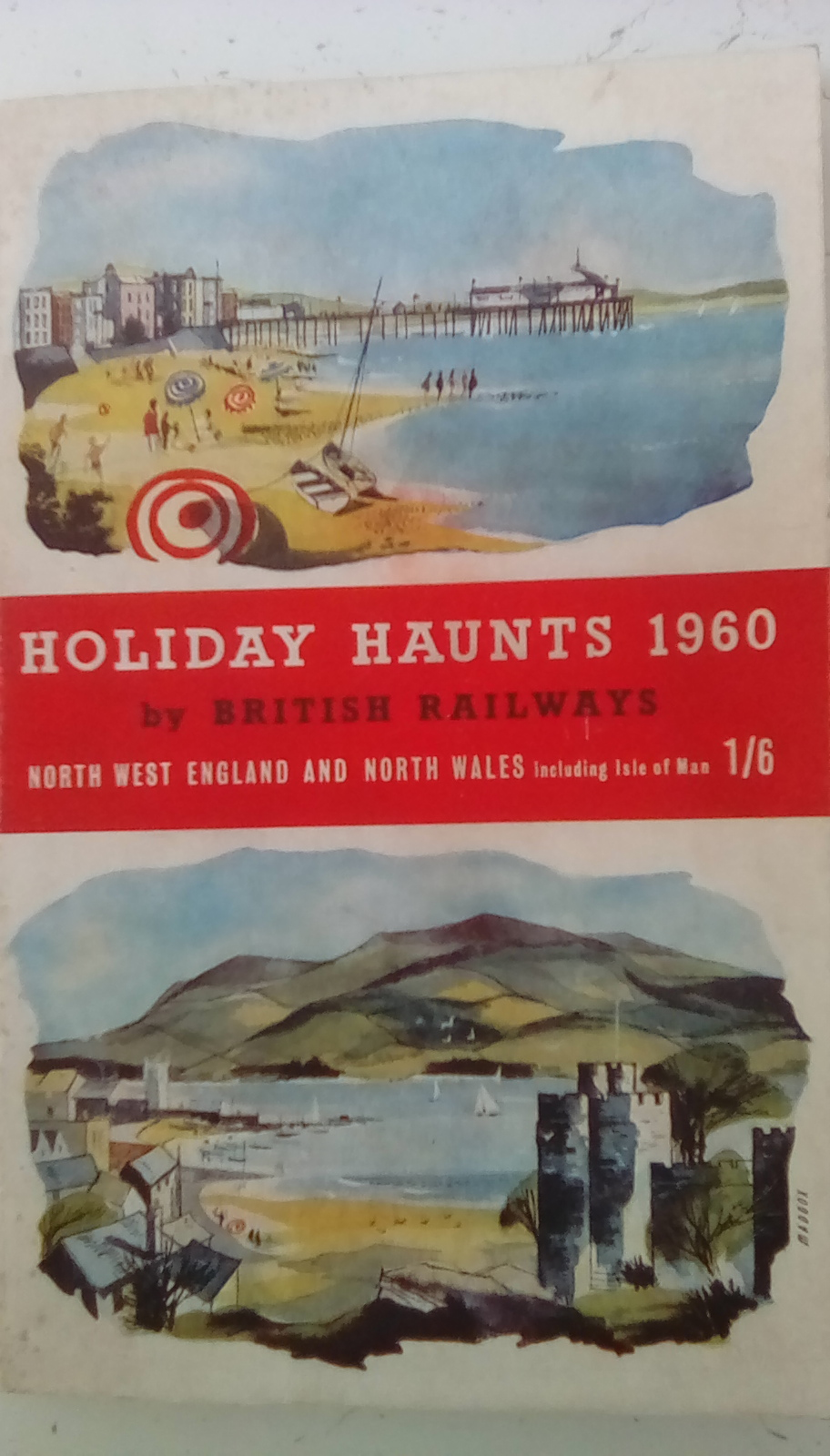
British Railways holiday haunts 1960 NW England and Wales

Prior to nationalisation each of the railway companies produced their own posters, leaflets and guides, examples of which are above. After the reintroduction of camping coaches in 1952 British Railways (BR) advertised them in a variety of ways, taking advertising space in public timetables and in the annual BR "Holiday Guide" ("Holiday Haunts" from 1958). Eye catching posters were produced and displayed at stations. A national pamphlet was produced each year from the mid 1950s until 1966 by which time the service was only available on the London Midland and Scottish regions, who then made do with simple fly-sheets. A final publicity effort was made by the sole remaining provider, the London Midland Region, in 1970.

=== Camping coaches in the media ===
Camping coaches were to be found on promotional films as part of the publicity effort:

- Camping Coach 1948 shows details of a Southern Region coach in Devon.
- Camping Coach 1953 shows details of an unlocated coach.
- The Railway Roundabout TV documentary series (1957-1963) featured some clips of camping coaches including a short article on them in 1958.

== Preserved coaches ==
A number of camping coaches made it into preservation, two of which at the Ravenglass and Eskdale Railway are still available for hire as camping coaches (although in 2020 they were undergoing refurbishment).

Former BR camping coaches were used by several preserved railways to house their volunteers, including the Llangollen Railway, the Gloucestershire Warwickshire Railway, the South Devon Railway, the Bodmin and Wenford Railway and the Severn Valley Railway.

== Modern camping coaches ==
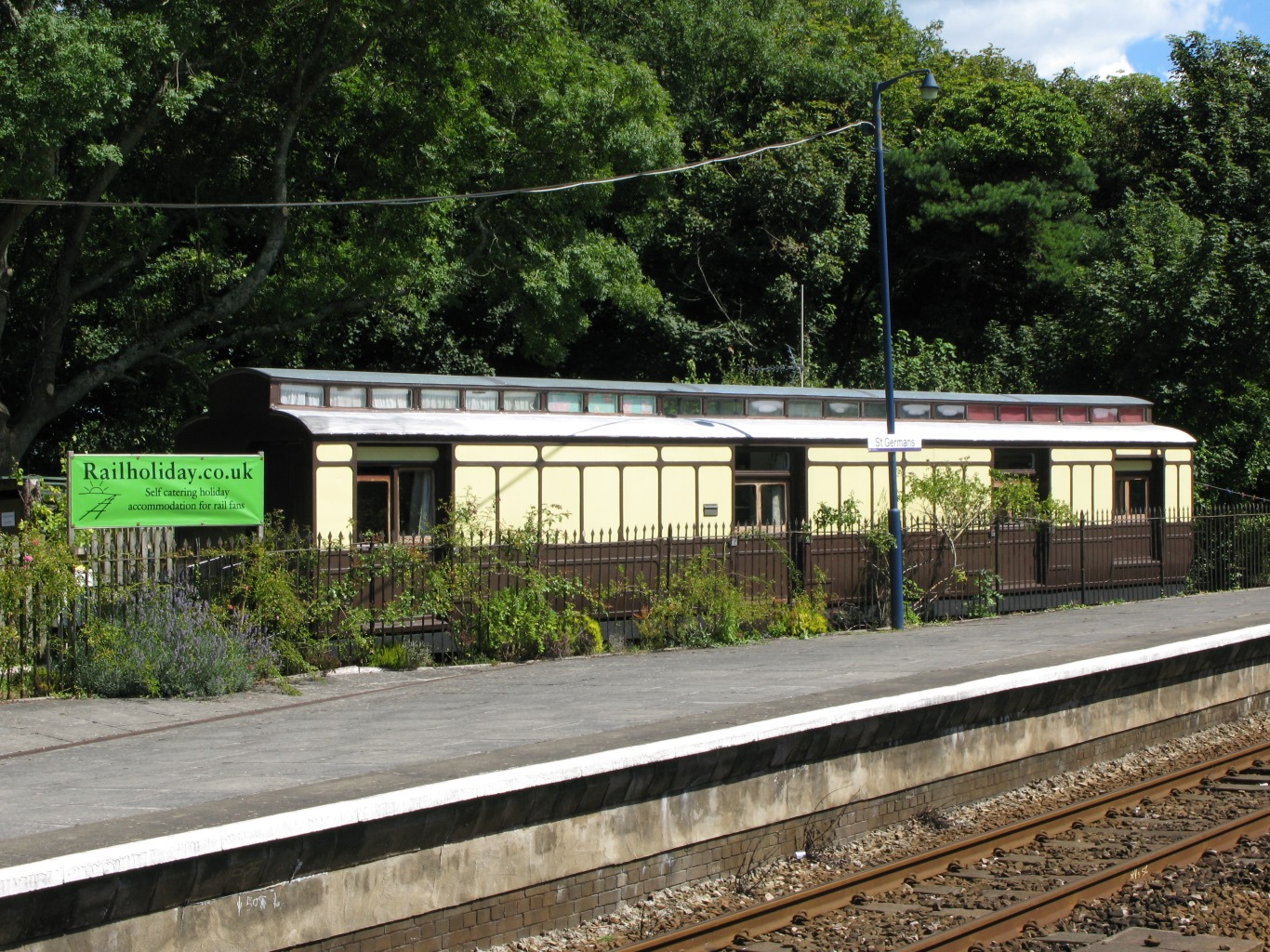
An ex-GWR Travelling Post Office camping coach at St Germans

=== United Kingdom ===
- Beaworthy, Devon.
- Bere Ferrers, Devon.
- Blue Anchor, Somerset.
- Bridge of Dee, near Castle Douglas, Dumfries and Galloway.
- Brockford Railway Siding at Wilby Halt, Suffolk.
- Bures, Suffolk.
- Canterbury, Kent.
- Cloughton, North Yorkshire.
- Coalport, Shropshire.
- Dawlish Warren, Devon.
- Eardisley, Herefordshire.
- Ebberston, North Yorkshire.
- Glenfinnan, Highland.
- Goathland, North Yorkshire.
- Heacham, Norfolk.
- Hayle, Cornwall.
- Hayling Island, Hampshire, two coaches combined and converted.
- Horsebridge, Hampshire, converted carriage in a restored station
- Levisham, North Yorkshire.
- Loch Awe, Argyll and Bute.
- Northiam, Converted coach, TOAD Brake Van & Ammunition Wagon located in the K&ESR station, Northiam, East Sussex.
- Petworth, West Sussex.
- Ravenglass, Cumbria.
- Rogart, Highland.
- Skipwith, North Yorkshire.
- St Germans, Cornwall.
- Ullock, near Cockermouth, Cumbria.
- Williton, Somerset.
- Wisbech St Mary, Cambridgeshire.

=== Other countries ===
- Amsterdam, Netherlands, Train Lodge hostel.
- Cape Town, South Africa.
- Dahn-Reichenbach, Germany, converted carriages.
- Fairbanks, Alaska.
- Frickingen, Germany.
- Merzen, Germany.
- Mossel Bay, Western Cape, South Africa.
- Tatamagouche train station, Nova Scotia, Canada, Train Station Inn & Railway Dining Car.
- Undara, Queensland, Australia.
- Wolkenstein, Germany.
