= Kingsbridge railway station =

Kingsbridge railway station can refer to:

- Dublin Heuston railway station in Ireland, formerly known as Kingsbridge station
- Kingsbridge railway station (England), closed station in Kingsbridge, Devon
- Kings Bridge (NYC station), on the Hudson Line in the Bronx, New York, United States
