= Luffness Platform railway station =

Former railway station in Scotland

Coordinates: 56.0235°N 2.8300°W

Luffness Platform

General information
- Location: Near Gullane, East Lothian; Scotland
- Platforms: 1

Other information
- Status: Disused

History
- Original company: Aberlady, Gullane and North Berwick Railway
- Pre-grouping: North British Railway
- Post-grouping: London and North Eastern Railway

Key dates
- 1 April 1898 or 1 September 1903: Opened
- 12 September 1932: Closed
- or 1 June 1931: Closed
Location

Luffness Platform (also known as Luffness Golf Club Halt) served a golf course near Gullane in Scotland. It was served by the Aberlady, Gullane and North Berwick railway. This line diverged from the North British Railway Main Line at Aberlady Junction, east of the current Longniddry station. For the private use of members of the Luffness Golf Club, this unstaffed halt was opened in 1898 and closed in 1932. Passengers alighting had to inform the train guard at Gullane or Aberlady and passengers joining the train there had to request it to stop by hand signals.

== History ==
Opened by the Aberlady, Gullane and North Berwick Railway, it was absorbed by the North British Railway. Then station passed on to the London and North Eastern Railway during the Grouping of 1923.

| Preceding station | Historical railways | Following station |
|---|---|---|
| Gullane; Line and Station closed | North British Railway; Aberlady, Gullane and North Berwick Railway | Aberlady; Line and Station closed |
