= Gullane railway station =

Railway station in East Lothian, Scotland

Gullane

General information
- Location: Gullane, East Lothian; Scotland
- Coordinates: 56.035908°N 2.8238750°W
- Grid reference: NT487828
- Platforms: 1

Other information
- Status: Disused

History
- Original company: Aberlady, Gullane and North Berwick Railway
- Pre-grouping: North British Railway
- Post-grouping: London and North Eastern Railway

Key dates
- 1 April 1898: Opened
- 12 September 1932: Closed to passengers
- 15 June 1964: Line closes to freight
Location

Gullane railway station served the village of Gullane in Scotland. It was served by the Aberlady, Gullane and North Berwick railway. This line diverged from the North British Railway Main Line at Aberlady Junction, east of the current Longniddry station.

== History ==
The station opened on 1 April 1898 as the terminus of the Aberlady, Gullane and North Berwick Railway when it began operating the line between here and Aberlady junction (on the North British Railway between Dunbar and Edinburgh). The line was intended to reach Dirleton and thereby provide a route to North Berwick, but this section was never constructed and Gullane remained as the terminus.

The station had one platform on the north side of a loop that allowed the engine to run around. There were three sidings behind the platform forming a goods yard able to accommodate most types of goods including livestock; it was equipped with a two ton crane. There was an engine shed and a signal box.

The line and station were absorbed by the North British Railway on 6 August 1900. The station then passed on to the London and North Eastern Railway (LNER) during the Grouping of 1923. That company withdrew passenger services nine years later, although the line was still open to freight until 1964.

The station building was used by LNER as a camping apartment from 1935. The Scottish Region continued this use of the buildings, sometimes marketed as Camping Cottages in the 1950s and up to the line closing in 1964. The station was also the location of a camping coach from 1956 to 1964.

Preceding station	Historical railways	Following station
North Berwick; Line never constructed	North British Railway; Aberlady, Gullane and North Berwick Railway	Luffness Platform; Line and Station closed

== The site today ==
The houses of Muirfeld Drive and Muirfield Station are built on the old site of Gullane railway station. A railway hotel, the Marine, was built in 1900 and was the main building of the Scottish Fire Service training school. This was closed in March 2015 and converted to housing.
