= Avonwick railway station =

Disused railway station in Devon, England

Coordinates: 50.40375°N 3.80511°W

Avonwick
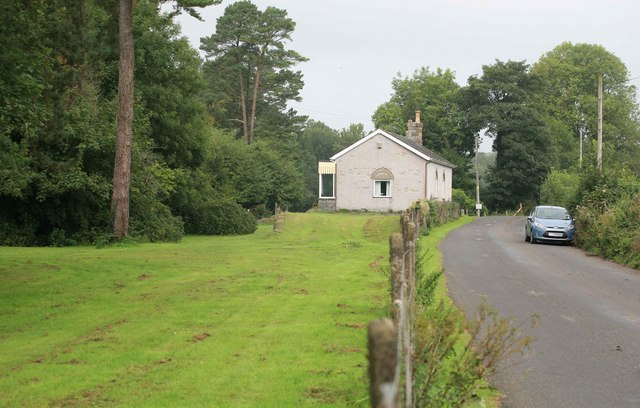
- The site of the station in 2010

General information
- Location: Avonwick, South Hams; England
- Grid reference: SX718575
- Platforms: 1

Other information
- Status: Disused

History
- Original company: Great Western Railway
- Pre-grouping: Great Western Railway
- Post-grouping: Great Western Railway; Western Region of British Railways

Key dates
- 19 December 1893: Station opened
- 16 September 1963: Station closed
Location

Avonwick railway station was a stop on the Kingsbridge branch line, which served the village of Avonwick in Devon, England.

== History ==
Avonwick station opened on 19 December 1893, when the Great Western Railway (GWR) opened the Kingsbridge branch line. The line had been authorised for building in 1882 by the Kingsbridge and Salcombe Railway, which was acquired subsequently by the GWR in 1888.

It was host to a GWR camp coach from 1934 to 1939; a camping coach was also positioned here by the Western Region from 1952 to 1954.

The station closed on 16 September 1963.

Preceding station	Disused railways	Following station
Brent	Great Western Railway (Kingsbridge branch line)	Gara Bridge

== The site today ==
The station is now a private home, with the platform canopy adapted as a conservatory.

== Bibliography ==
- Fenton, Mike (1999), Camp Coach Holidays on the G.W.R, Wild Swan, ISBN 1-874103-53-4
- Grant, Donald J. (2017). Directory of the Railway Companies of Great Britain (1st ed.). Kibworth Beauchamp, Leicestershire: Troubador Publishing Ltd. ISBN 978-1-78803-768-6.
- McRae, Andrew (1997). British Railway Camping Coach Holidays: The 1930s & British Railways (London Midland Region). Vol. Scenes from the Past: 30 (Part One). Foxline. ISBN 1-870119-48-7.
- McRae, Andrew (1998). British Railways Camping Coach Holidays: A Tour of Britain in the 1950s and 1960s. Vol. Scenes from the Past: 30 (Part Two). Foxline. ISBN 1-870119-53-3.
- Quick, Michael (2022) [2001]. Railway passenger stations in Great Britain: a chronology (PDF). version 5.04. Railway & Canal Historical Society. Archived from the original (PDF) on 25 November 2022.
