= Marcia Willett =

British writer of women's fiction (1945–2022)

- Born: 6 August 1945; Somerset
- Died: 30 June 2022 (aged 76)
- Occupation: novelist
- Children: 1
- Writing career
- Genre: women's fiction
- Website: marciawillett.co.uk

Marcia Willett (6 August 1945 - 30 June 2022) was a British novelist who wrote women's fiction. She published 36 novels, including four as Willa Marsh.

== Early life and education ==
Willett was born in Somerset, and had four older sisters. She trained as a ballet dancer in Bristol, and worked as a dance teacher.

== Writing ==
Willett started writing aged 50, for financial reasons during the 1991 recession in the UK. Many of her novels were set in South Devon, and she uses the real names of businesses and the people who run them. She believed that her books increased tourism in the area.

Her first book, Those Who Serve (1995), was about navy wives, based on her own experiences. The Plymouth Extra wrote of it "It has a nice gossipy feel, enough tension to keep the pages turning over, and is well-written ... There's an old-fashioned feel to the well-drawn main characters who are surprisingly snobbish (are Navy wives really this class-obsessed?) ... [a] very amiable book". The people she writes about are upper class and educate their children privately. Her characters are often older women.

Willett's publisher compared her books to those of Rosamunde Pilcher. When the rights for American publication were sold to the American publisher Transworld in 2002, it was for a six-figure amount, influenced by the comparison to Pilcher. There was a "mighty marketing spend" as part of the American launch.

Her novels have been translated, and are popular in France and Germany. Novels written as Willa Marsh are darker than her others.

=== Critical reception ===
Her books have been categorised as women's fiction. They have been described as "gentle". As well as to Rosamunde Pilcher, she was compared to Maeve Binchy.

Booklist said of The Children's Hour (2003) that "Willett captures the sights, sounds, and smells of seaside Devon superbly, and her characters are just complex enough to draw us into the story and keep us there contentedly". A Week in Winter (2001) was described in Publishers Weekly as "thin, treacly fare ... [the protagonist] simply isn't an intriguing enough heroine to center a novel on, since most of her time is spent obsessing about the past and talking to her dog". Kirkus Reviews described A Week in Winter as "Stodgy, colorless family drama, despite all the soapy complications and armchair psychology". For Echoes of the Dance (2006), Publishers Weekly found the characters "Appealing, durable, human", but the ending "stagy sentimentality". Christmas in Cornwall (2011), set in a convent, was described in Booklist as "a deeply meaningful story about the power of family and finding the strength to face the future". Kirkus Reviews wrote of the same book "For the right reader, this book has charm, appealing characterization and a sprawling, unhurried storytelling style - though Willett's present-tense writing and occasional head-hopping may be distracting. For most contemporary romance fans, the lack of a convincing happily-ever-after ending and the not-quite-concrete plot wrap-up that speaks to more spiritually decisive conclusions, rather than romantic ones, will likely make them feel disappointed and misled by the romance designation". Book Reporter said of A Summer in the Country (2002) that "Two of the women are treated badly by men to a ridiculous point. Readers will wonder why they cannot find other fulfillment, such as in a satisfying hobby, a career, or at least some self-respect".

Of her books as Willa Marsh, Facing the Music (1997) was reviewed in the Edinburgh Evening News as "a sharply detailed account of modern marriage and the unexpected fall-out of 1960s living". Sisters Under the Skin (1998) was described as a black comedy.

== Personal life ==
Willett was married twice, firstly in 1969 to an officer in the Royal Navy Submarine Service. She had a son, born in 1970. Her second husband, Rodney Willett, had also been in the Royal Navy; he died in 2015. When her first novel was published in 1995, she was living in Avonwick, in South Hams, Devon. At the time of her death, she lived in Totnes, Devon.

She died on 30 June 2022, aged 76.

== Books ==
=== Chadwick Family Chronicles ===
- Looking Forward (1998, Headline)
- Holding On (2000, Headline)
- Winning Through (2001, Headline)
- The Prodigal Wife (2009, Bantam Press)
- Christmas at the Keep (2022, Transworld), novella; republished in 2024 by Penguin Books as Christmas at the Keep: and other stories

=== Kate Webster series ===
- Those Who Serve (1995, Headline), published in America as First Friends
- Thea's Parrot (1995, Headline), published in America as A Friend of the Family
- Echoes of the Dance (2006, Bantam Press)

=== Other novels ===
- The Courtyard (1995, Headline)
- The Dipper (1996, Headline)
- Hattie's Mill (1997, Headline)
- Starting Over (1997, Headline)
- Second Time Around (1998, Headline)
- A Week in Winter (2001, Headline)
- A Summer in the Country (2002)
- Forgotten Laughter (2002, Headline)
- The Children's Hour (2003, Bantam Press)
- The Birdcage (2004, Bantam Press)
- The Golden Cup (2005, Bantam Press)
- Memories Of The Storm (2005, Bantam Press)
- The Way We Were (2008, Bantam Press)
- The Summer House (2010, Bantam Press)
- The Christmas Angel (2011, Bantam Press), also published as Christmas in Cornwall
- The Sea Garden (2012, Bantam Press)
- Postcards from the Past (2013, Penguin Books)
- Indian Summer (2014, Bantam Press)
- Summer On The River (2015, Bantam Press)
- The Songbird (2016, Bantam Press)
- Seven Days in Summer (2017, Bantam Press)
- Homecomings (2018, Bantam Press)
- Reflections (2019, Bantam Press)
- The Garden House (2020, Bantam Press)
- Starry, Starry Night (2021, Bantam Press)

=== As Willa Marsh ===
- Amy Wingate's Journal (1996, Sceptre)
- Facing the Music (1997, Sceptre)
- The Quick and the Dead (1999, Sceptre)
- Sisters Under the Skin (1998, Sceptre)
