= Gara Bridge railway station =

Disused railway station in Devon, England

Coordinates: 50.3665°N 3.7875°W

Gara Bridge
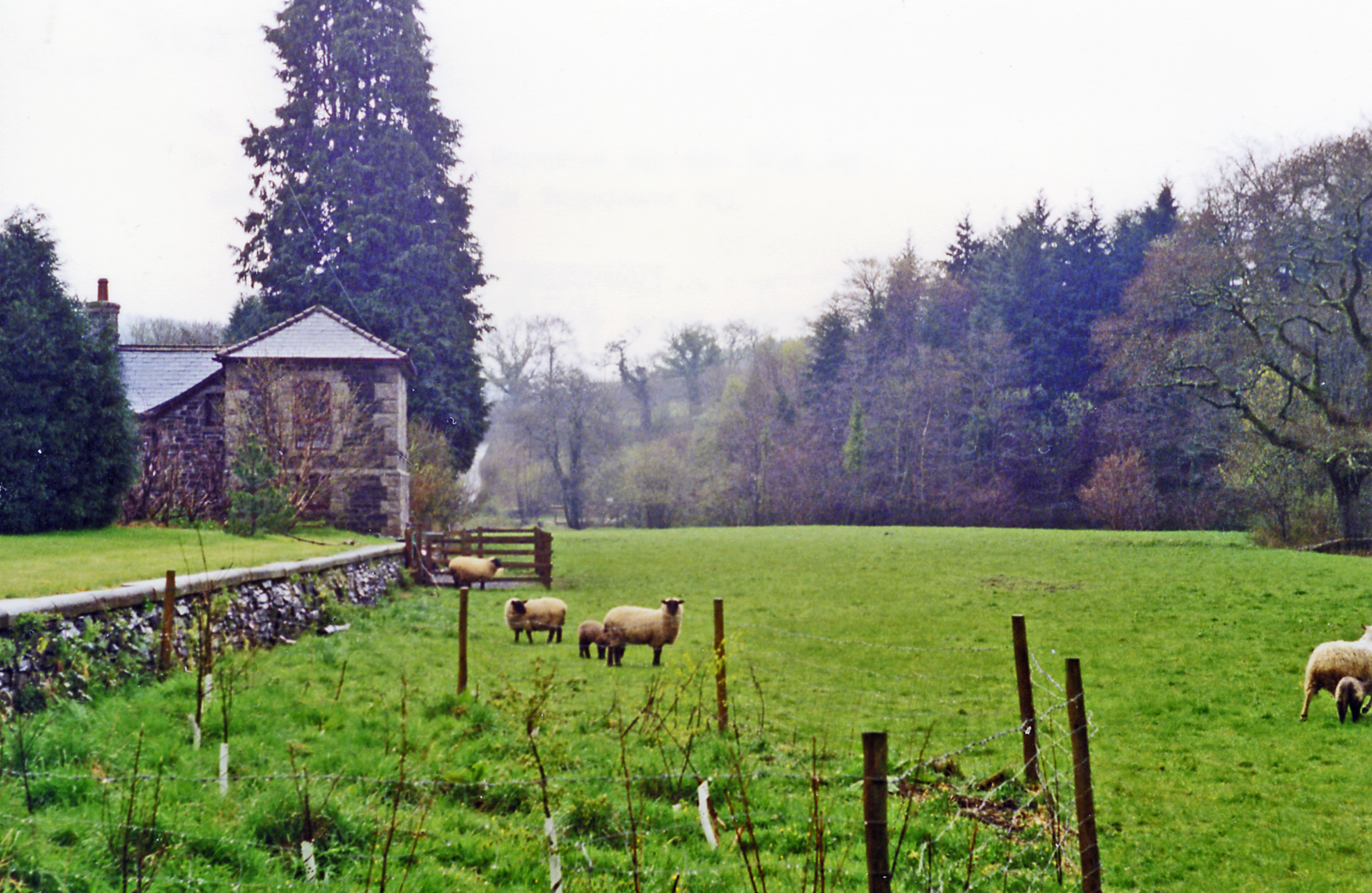
- Remains of the station (1995)

General information
- Location: Curtisknowle, South Hams; England
- Grid reference: SX730534
- Platforms: 2

Other information
- Status: Disused

History
- Original company: Great Western Railway
- Pre-grouping: Great Western Railway
- Post-grouping: Great Western Railway; Western Region of British Railways

Key dates
- 19 December 1893: Station opened
- 16 September 1963: Station closed
Location

Gara Bridge railway station was a stop on the Kingsbridge branch line of the Great Western Railway.

== History ==
Gara Bridge station opened on 19 December 1893, when the Great Western Railway (GWR) opened the Kingsbridge branch line. The line was authorised for building in 1882 by the Kingsbridge and Salcombe Railway, which was acquired subsequently by the GWR in 1888.

The stone-built station was the only one on the line to have a passing loop. It was host to a GWR camp coach from 1934 to 1939; a camping coach was also positioned here by the Western Region in 1956 and 1957, then two coaches from 1958 to 1962.

Despite a great deal of local opposition, the station was closed for passengers and goods on 16 September 1963.

Preceding station	Disused railways	Following station
Avonwick	Great Western Railway; Kingsbridge branch line	Loddiswell

== The site today ==
The station building is now a private dwelling.

== Bibliography ==
- Fenton, Mike (1999), Camp Coach Holidays on the G.W.R, Wild Swan, ISBN 1-874103-53-4
- Grant, Donald J. (2017). Directory of the Railway Companies of Great Britain (1st ed.). Kibworth Beauchamp, Leicestershire: Troubador Publishing Ltd. ISBN 978-1-78803-768-6.
- McRae, Andrew (1997). British Railway Camping Coach Holidays: The 1930s & British Railways (London Midland Region). Vol. Scenes from the Past: 30 (Part One). Foxline. ISBN 1-870119-48-7.
- McRae, Andrew (1998). British Railways Camping Coach Holidays: A Tour of Britain in the 1950s and 1960s. Vol. Scenes from the Past: 30 (Part Two). Foxline. ISBN 1-870119-53-3.
- Quick, Michael (2022) [2001]. Railway passenger stations in Great Britain: a chronology (PDF). version 5.04. Railway & Canal Historical Society. Archived from the original (PDF) on 25 November 2022.
