= Braithwaite railway station =

Former railway station in Cumberland, England

Braithwaite
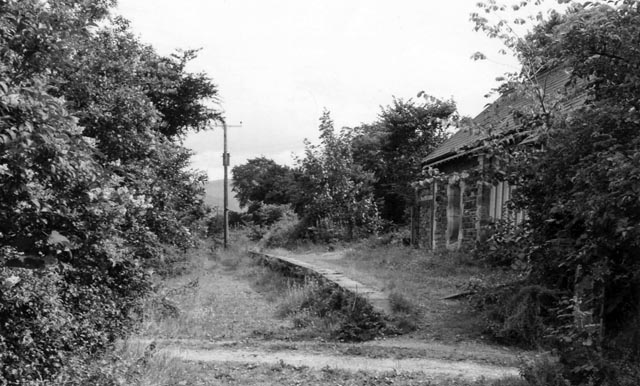
- The station in 1974

General information
- Location: Braithwaite, Cumberland; England
- Coordinates: 54.607°N 3.187°W
- Platforms: 1

Other information
- Status: Disused

History
- Original company: Cockermouth, Keswick and Penrith Railway
- Pre-grouping: Cockermouth, Keswick and Penrith Railway
- Post-grouping: London, Midland and Scottish Railway

Key dates
- 2 January 1865: Station opened
- 18 April 1966: Station closed
Location

Braithwaite railway station was situated on the Cockermouth, Keswick and Penrith Railway between Penrith and Cockermouth in Cumbria, England. The station served the village of Braithwaite.

The station opened to passenger traffic on 2 January 1865. The station was host to six LMS caravans in 1934 and 1935 followed by eight caravans from 1936 to 1939. A camping coach was also positioned here by the London Midland Region from 1958 to 1964.

The station closed on 18 April 1966.

The station building survives as a private residence.

Preceding station	Disused railways	Following station
Bassenthwaite Lake	Cockermouth, Keswick and Penrith Railway	Keswick
