= Cloughton railway station =

Former railway station in the North Riding of Yorkshire, England

Cloughton
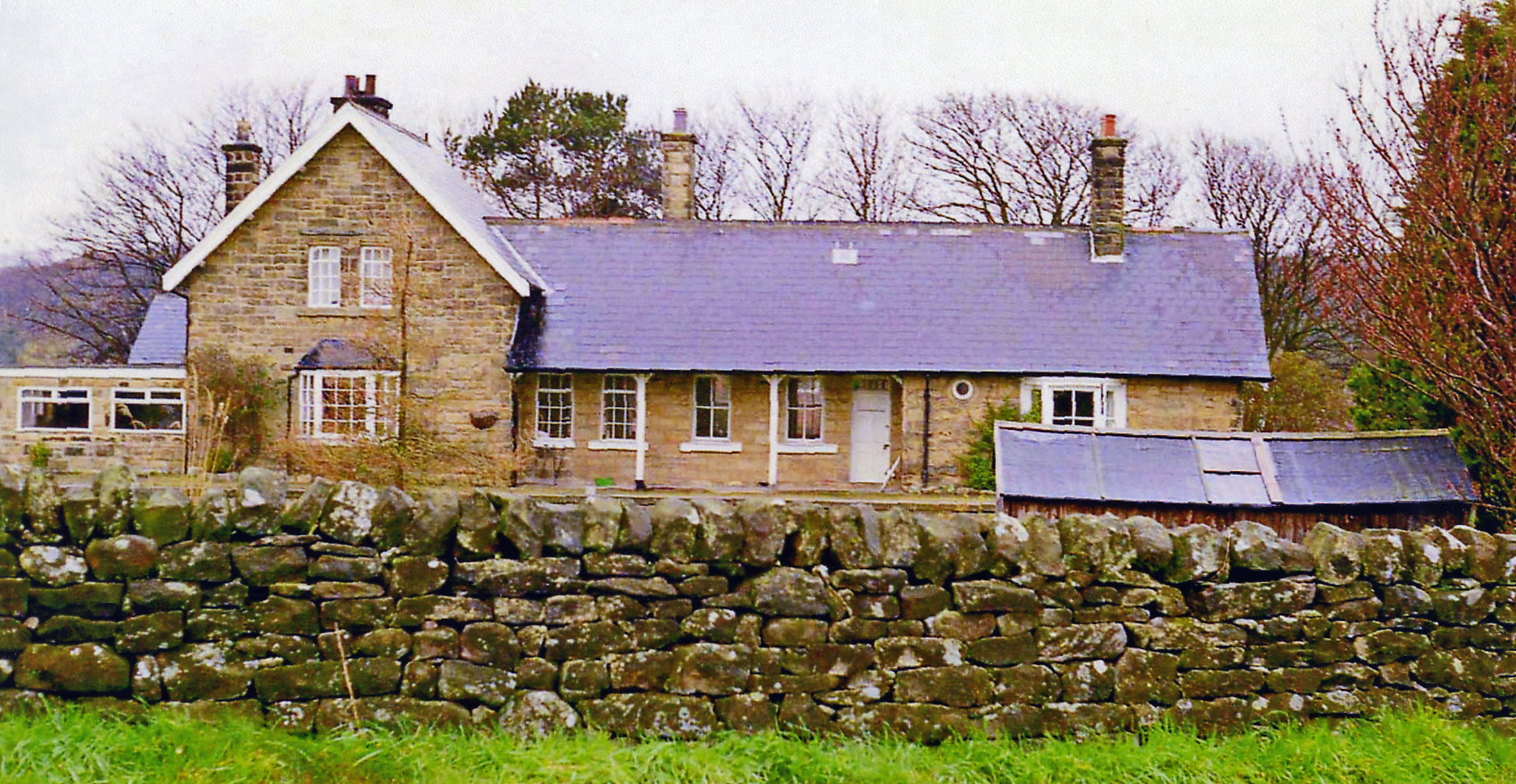
- The former station at Cloughton in 1989

General information
- Location: Cloughton, North Yorkshire; England
- Coordinates: 54.332500°N 0.445850°W
- Grid reference: TA011941
- Platforms: 2

Other information
- Status: Disused

History
- Original company: Scarborough & Whitby Railway
- Pre-grouping: North Eastern Railway
- Post-grouping: London and North Eastern Railway

Key dates
- 1885: Opened
- 1965: Closed
Location

Cloughton railway station was a railway station on the Scarborough & Whitby Railway. It opened on 16 July 1885, and served the North Yorkshire villages of Cloughton and Burniston.

The station had a canopied goods shed, and the '1904 Handbook of Stations', listed it as being able to handle general goods, livestock, horse boxes and prize cattle vans. It also had a 1-ton 10 cwt permanent crane. The station was host to a LNER camping coach in 1935, possibly one for some of 1934 and three coaches from 1936 to 1939. Two coaches were positioned here by North Eastern Region of British Railways from 1954 and three from 1959 to 1964.

The station closed on 8 March 1965. The station building has been restored and is currently used as a private house, with guest accommodation provided in a converted railway carriage, a converted goods shed, and two B&B suites. A tea room formerly operated in the station building, but that closed in September 2019. The railway alignment through the station is used by the Cinder Track, a multi-use path between Scarborough and Whitby.

== Bibliography ==
- Butt, R. V. J. (October 1995). The Directory of Railway Stations: details every public and private passenger station, halt, platform and stopping place, past and present (1st ed.). Sparkford: Patrick Stephens Ltd. ISBN 978-1-85260-508-7. OCLC 60251199. OL 11956311M.
- Chapman, Stephen (2008). York to Scarborough Whitby & Ryedale. Bellcode Books. ISBN 978-1-871233-19-3.

| Preceding station | Disused railways | Following station |
|---|---|---|
| Scalby; Line and station closed | North Eastern Railway; Scarborough & Whitby Railway | Hayburn Wyke; Line and station closed |
