= Hayburn Wyke =

Site of Special Scientific Interest on the North Sea coast of North Yorkshire, England

- Site of Special Scientific Interest
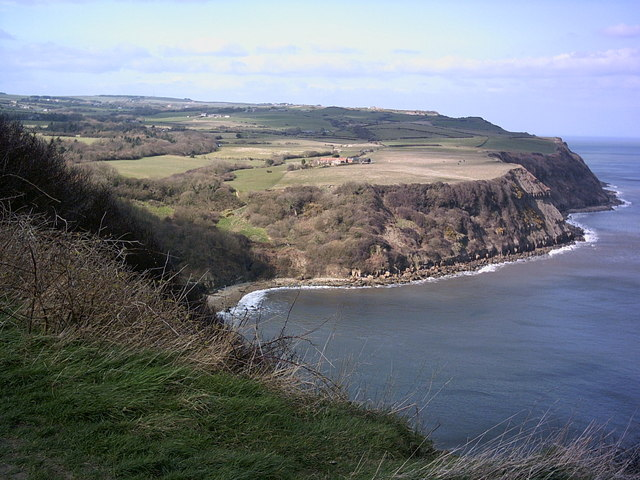
- Hayburn Wyke (centre left) seen from the cliffs to the south

- Location within North Yorkshire
- Location of Hayburn Wyke.
- Area of search: North Yorkshire
- Grid reference: TA 012 968
- Coordinates: 54.359333°N 0.447222°W
- Interest: Biological and Geological
- Area: 21.21 hectares (52.4 acres)
- Notification date: 1986
- Location map: Magic Map

Hayburn Wyke is a 21.21-hectare (52.4-acre) biological and geological Site of Special Scientific Interest (SSSI) on the coast of the North Sea to the north of Scarborough in the English county of North Yorkshire. The site is split between the civil parishes of Cloughton and Staintondale, and is within the North Yorkshire Moors National Park.

The name derives from the Old English for a hunting enclosure by a stream (Hayburn) and the Old Norse for a sea inlet or creek (vik). True to its name, Hayburn Wyke is a secluded bay that is accessible by a short but steep path from the cliff top. The bay features a pebbly beach, backed by wooded cliffs, and a pair of waterfalls that cascade down from the woods above to the beach below.

The beach features rock pools inhabited by a wide variety of aquatic creatures. The woodland, now owned by the National Trust originally comprised oak, ash and beech trees; many were felled during the Second World War but restoration has been ongoing since the 1980s.

The cliffs at Hayburn Wyke date from the Middle Jurassic period, and are overlain by a thick deposit of boulder clay. The beck, and its waterfalls, have exposed the Hayburn Wyke plant bed, which forms part of the Cloughton Formation and contains a rich set of fossils of around sixty species, dominated by cycads.

At the top of the cliffs is the Hayburn Wyke Inn, which offers food and overnight accommodation. Hayburn Wyke can be accessed from either the Cleveland Way coastal path or the Cinder Track, the disused railway track that is now a walking and cycling path, which both run close together at this point. There is also road access to the inn. Until 1965, Hayburn Wyke had its own railway station.

== Gallery ==
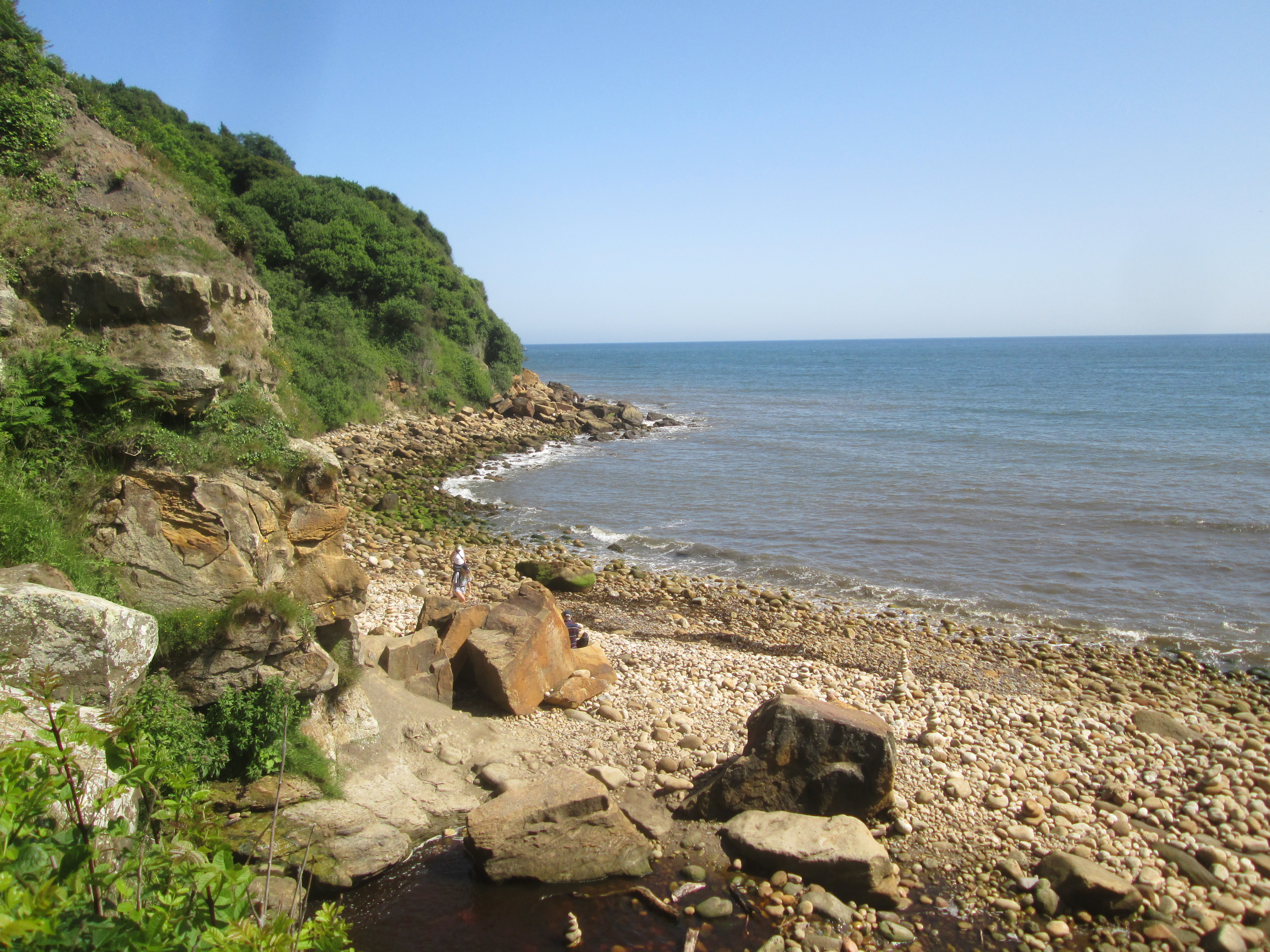
Beach

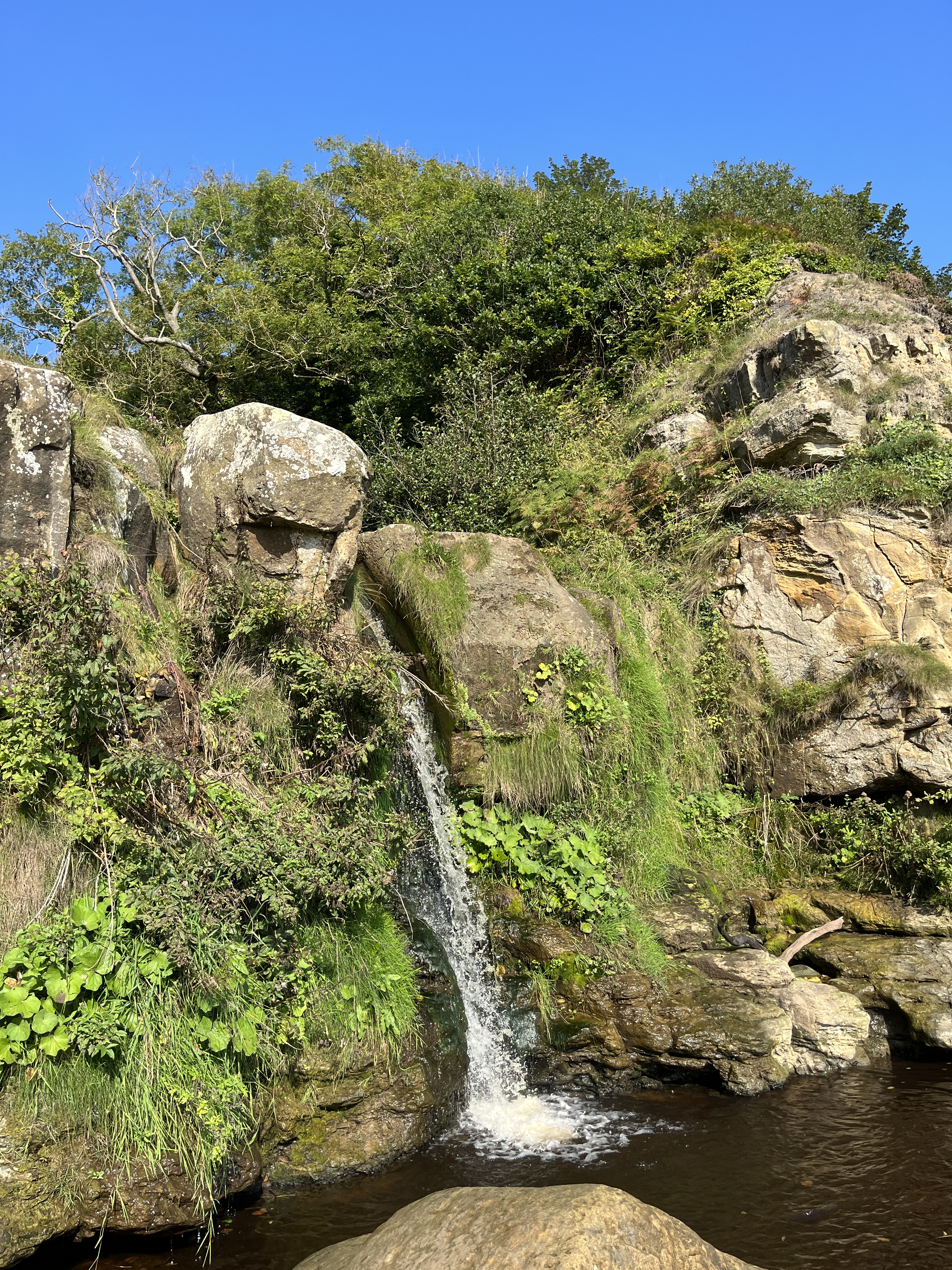
Waterfall

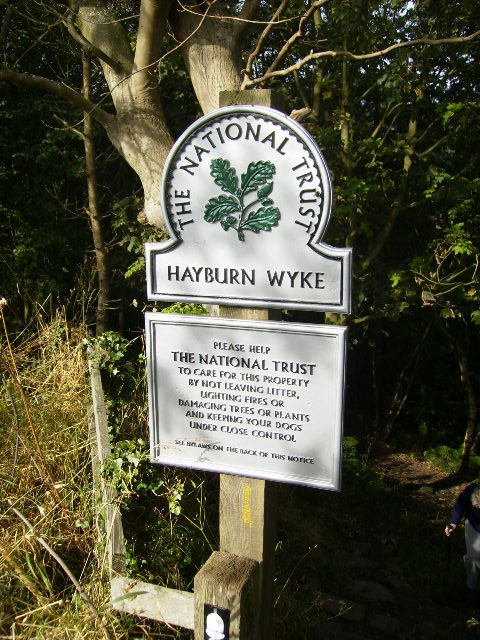
Sign

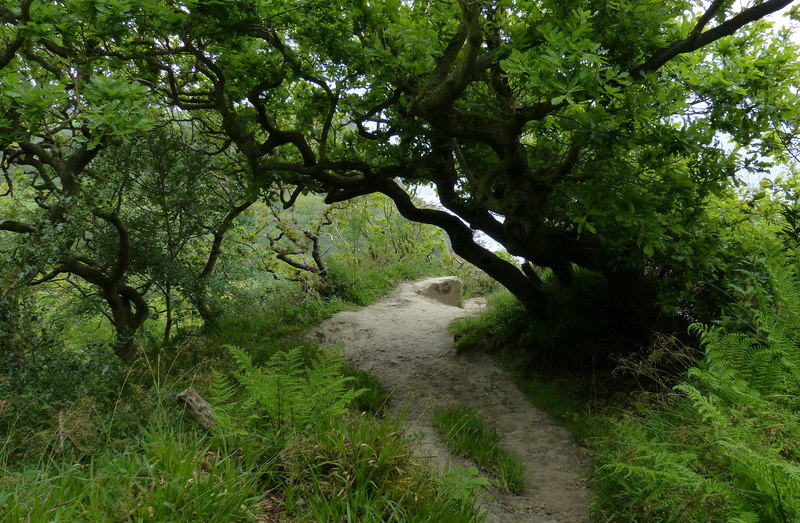
Woodland
