= Loddiswell railway station =

Disused railway station in Devon, England

Coordinates: 50.3215°N 3.7844°W

Loddiswell
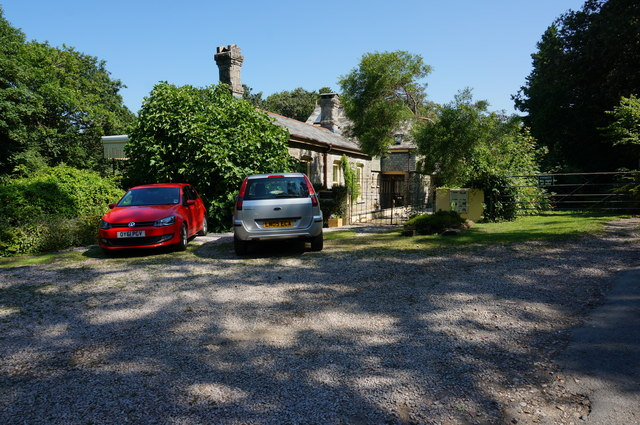
- Loddiswell station building in 2014

General information
- Location: Loddiswell, South Hams; England
- Grid reference: SX730483
- Platforms: 1

Other information
- Status: Disused

History
- Original company: Great Western Railway
- Pre-grouping: Great Western Railway
- Post-grouping: Great Western Railway; Western Region of British Railways

Key dates
- 19 December 1893: Station opened
- 16 September 1963: Station closed
Location

Loddiswell railway station was a stop on the Kingsbridge branch line of the Great Western Railway.

== History ==
The stone-built station opened on the 19 December 1893 when the Great Western Railway (GWR) opened the Kingsbridge branch line. The line was authorised for building in 1882 by the Kingsbridge and Salcombe Railway, which was acquired subsequently by the GWR in 1888.

The station was host to a GWR camp coach from 1934 to 1939; another was also positioned here by the Western Region from 1952 to 1957, then two coaches from 1958 to 1961.

The station was downgraded to an unstaffed halt when it closed to freight on 6 February 1961. Despite local opposition, it was closed on 16 September 1963.

Preceding station	Disused railways	Following station
Gara Bridge	Great Western Railway (Kingsbridge branch line)	Kingsbridge

== The site today ==
The Signal Box annex was redeveloped as holiday accommodation and opened in 2015. Tours of the station grounds and old platform are provided by the owners by arrangement.
