= Aber railway station (Gwynedd) =

Disused railway station in Gwynedd, Wales

Aber
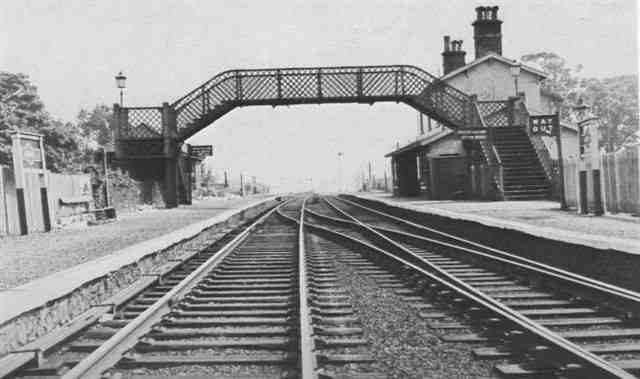
- Aber station in 1936, looking east toward Conwy

General information
- Location: Abergwyngregyn, Gwynedd; Wales
- Coordinates: 53.2387°N 4.0226°W
- Grid reference: SH650732
- Platforms: 2

Other information
- Status: Disused

History
- Opened: 1 May 1848
- Closed: 12 September 1960
- Original company: Chester and Holyhead Railway
- Pre-grouping: London and North Western Railway
- Post-grouping: London Midland and Scottish Railway
Location

Aber railway station was a railway station on the North Wales Coast Line in the Welsh county of Gwynedd. Although trains still pass on the main line, the station closed in 1960. A signal box on the site remained in use until the installation of colour light signalling.

== History ==
The station was opened by the Chester and Holyhead Railway on 1 May 1848 when it opened its line as far as Bangor.

The station had two platforms on either side of a double track line. Facilities for goods included cattle pens and a siding for loading slate from the adjacent writing slate manufactory.

The station was host to a LMS caravan from 1934 to 1938 followed by four caravans in 1939. A camping coach was also positioned at the Aber station by the London Midland Region from 1954 to 1959.

The station was closed by the British Transport Commission on 12 September 1960.

== Bibliography ==
- Grant, Donald J. (2017). Directory of the Railway Companies of Great Britain (1st ed.). Kibworth Beauchamp, Leicestershire: Troubador Publishing Ltd. ISBN 978-1-78803-768-6.
- McRae, Andrew (1997). British Railway Camping Coach Holidays: The 1930s & British Railways (London Midland Region). Vol. Scenes from the Past: 30 (Part One). Foxline. ISBN 1-870119-48-7.
- Quick, Michael (2022) [2001]. Railway passenger stations in Great Britain: a chronology (PDF). version 5.04. Railway & Canal Historical Society. Archived from the original (PDF) on 25 November 2022.
- The Railway Clearing House (1970) [1904]. The Railway Clearing House Handbook of Railway Stations 1904 (1970 D&C Reprint ed.). Newton Abbot: David & Charles Reprints. p. 461. ISBN 0-7153-5120-6.

Preceding station	Historical railways	Following station
Llanfairfechan	London and North Western Railway; North Wales Coast Line	Bangor
