= Scalby railway station =

Railway station in North Yorkshire, England

Scalby
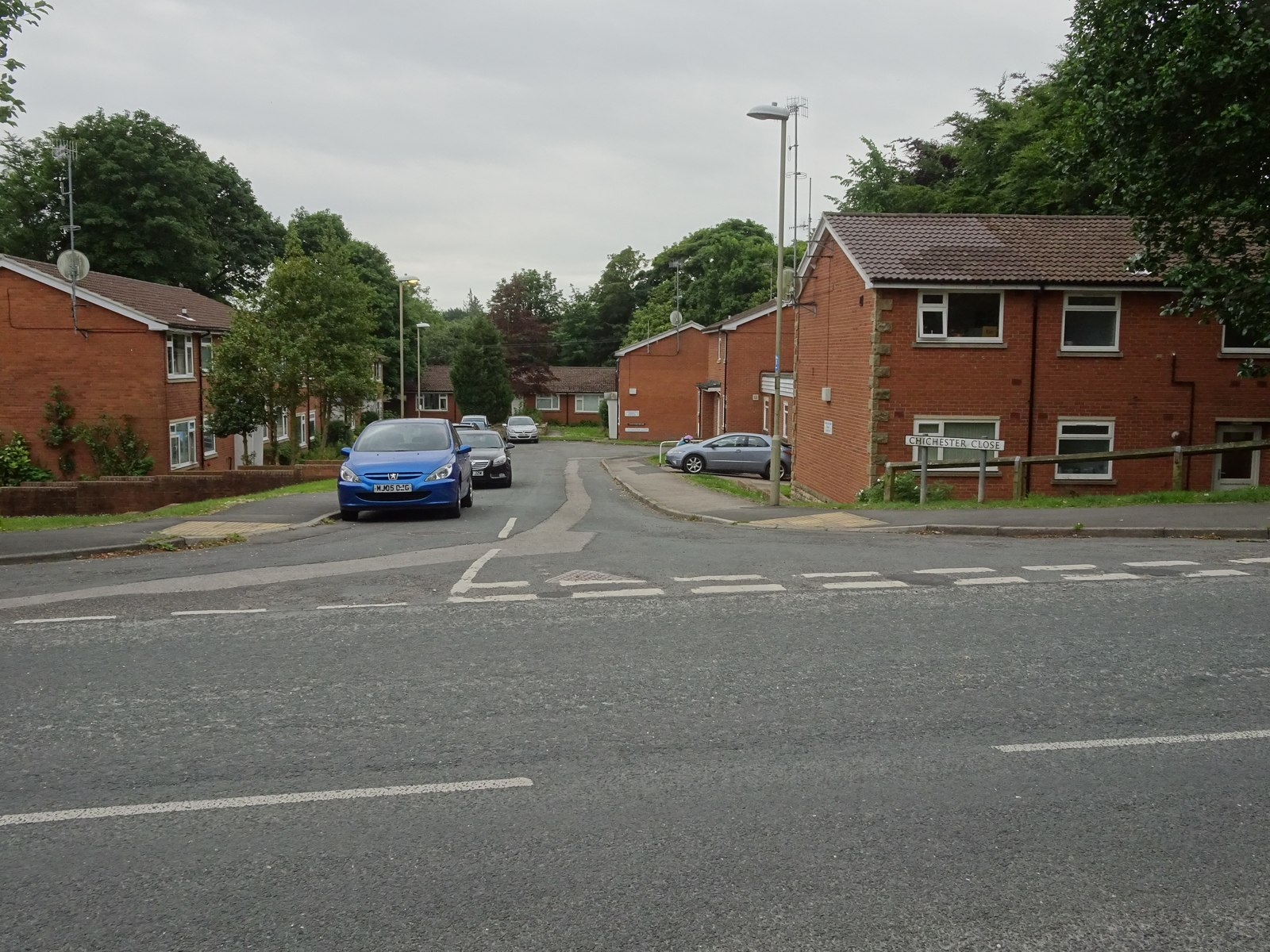
- Chichester Close on the site of Scalby station (2018)

General information
- Location: Scalby, North Yorkshire; England
- Coordinates: 54.300800°N 0.441391°W
- Grid reference: TA015905
- Platforms: 1

Other information
- Status: Disused

History
- Original company: Scarborough & Whitby Railway
- Pre-grouping: North Eastern Railway

Key dates
- 16 July 1885: Opened
- 2 March 1953: Closed for regular passenger services
- 1964: Closed completely
Location

Scalby railway station was a railway station on the Scarborough & Whitby Railway.

== History ==
The station opened on 16 July 1885, and served the village of Scalby. It was situated immediately north of Scalby Viaduct and had a single platform, a goods bay, and another siding.

The station closed to regular traffic on 2 March 1953, the station building was then converted into a camping cottage. Two camping coaches were positioned here by the North Eastern Region from 1954 to 1956 and four coaches were here from 1957 until 1964. Occasional trains stopped for users of these facilities until final closure in 1964, Quick (2022) notes that two or three trains each way had definite calls in the working timetable of June 1961.

In 1974, the station was completely demolished, and a road called Chichester Close has been built on the site since. Some of the stonework has been reused as corner stones, embedded in the brickwork, of houses in this street.

Scalby Viaduct still stands, and has four spans of 35 feet (11 m) each. It is crossed by the Cinder Track multi-use path, which then passes along Chichester Close.

== Accidents and incidents ==
- On 24 April 1956, BR Standard Class 4 2-6-4T No. 80119 was derailed when the track spread under it during shunting. An instruction banning heavy locomotives from the goods yard had been forgotten.

== Bibliography ==
- Butt, R.V.J. (1995). The Directory Of Railway Stations. Patrick Stephens Limited. ISBN 1-85260-508-1.

Preceding station	Disused railways	Following station
Scarborough Central; Line closed, station open	North Eastern Railway; Scarborough & Whitby Railway	Cloughton; Line and station closed
