= Avonwick =

Village in Devon, England

Coordinates: 50.409°N 3.814°W

- Village
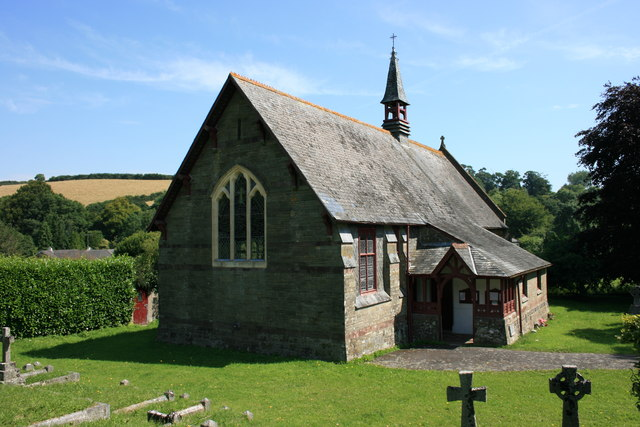
- St James's Church, Avonwick

- Location within Devon
- OS grid reference: SX715584
- Civil parish: North Huish
- District: South Hams
- Shire county: Devon
- Region: South West
- Country: England
- Sovereign state: United Kingdom
- Postcode district: TQ10
- Dialling code: 01364
- Police: Devon and Cornwall
- Fire: Devon and Somerset
- Ambulance: South Western

Avonwick is a village in the civil parish of North Huish, in the South Hams district, in the county of Devon, England. The River Avon runs through the settlement and the village's name derives from avon meaning river, and wick an old word for village, but it was not so named until the 1870s, previously being known as Newhouse.

Avonwick has about 120 houses in the main village and has rapidly grown in size over the last few years, with three developments adding 17 houses in the late 1990s, 7 houses in 2000 and 33 houses in 2012.

The village church, dedicated to St James in 1878, is one of only a few proprietary chapels remaining in the country. The village also has a pub, one of the oldest lawn tennis clubs in the world and a garage, with a further restaurant on the road to South Brent. The village had a succession of shops from 1871, but the last village shop closed in 2018.

The village has one of the oldest walkways in Devon: known as the Cobbly Way or Cobbly Walk, the cobbled track alongside the river shows traces of ancient cart ruts over its 400-yard length.

Avonwick railway station opened about 0.5 miles (1 kilometre) outside the village in 1893, on the branch line between South Brent and Kingsbridge. The station and line closed in 1963.

== Notable residents ==
- Marcia Willett (1945-2022), novelist, was living in Avonwick at the time her first novel was published in 1995. Many of her books are set in Devon.
