= Kingsbridge railway station (England) =

Disused railway station in Devon, England

Coordinates: 50.2828°N 3.7810°W

Kingsbridge
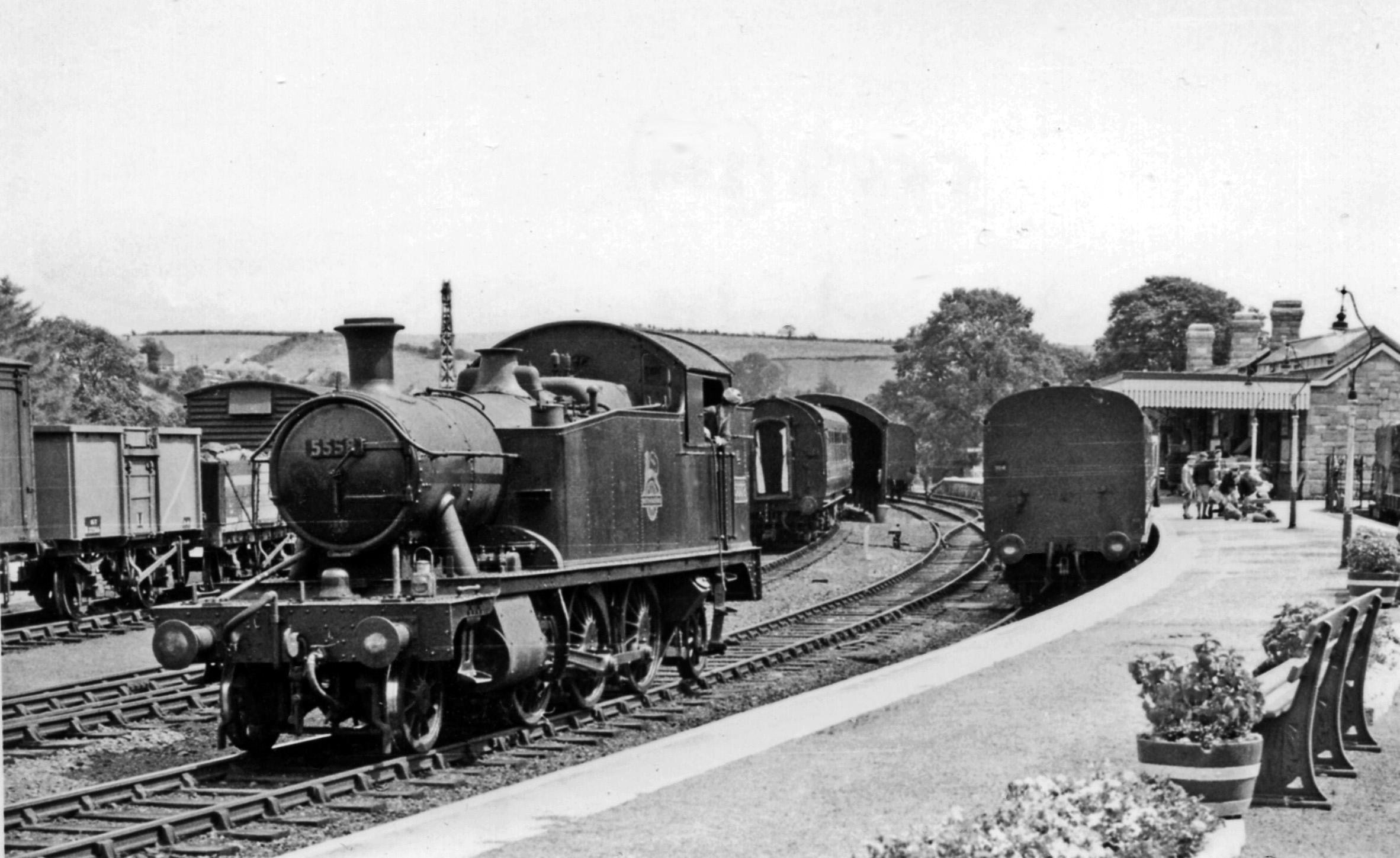
- View eastward, towards the buffer-stops in 1958

General information
- Location: Kingsbridge, South Hams; England
- Grid reference: SX732441
- Platforms: 1

Other information
- Status: Disused

History
- Original company: Great Western Railway
- Pre-grouping: Great Western Railway
- Post-grouping: Great Western Railway; Western Region of British Railways

Key dates
- 19 December 1893: Opened
- 16 September 1963: Closed
Location

Kingsbridge railway station was the terminus station of the single track branch GWR line from Brent to the town of Kingsbridge.

== History ==
The station opened in December 1893 to serve the town and towns in the surrounding area such as Salcombe. Work was started on construction of the extension of the line from Kingsbridge to Salcombe but work was soon abandoned. The station saw a 25% increase in traffic during its last year of operation.

The station was closed for freight and passengers on 16 September 1963, and the site is now covered by an industrial estate.

== Description ==
The station buildings were constructed in stone except for a corrugated iron carriage shed.

== Services ==
Preceding station	Disused railways	Following station
Loddiswell	Great Western Railway (Kingsbridge branch line)	Terminus
