= Bassenthwaite Lake railway station =

Former railway station, now cafe, in Cumberland, England

Bassenthwaite Lake
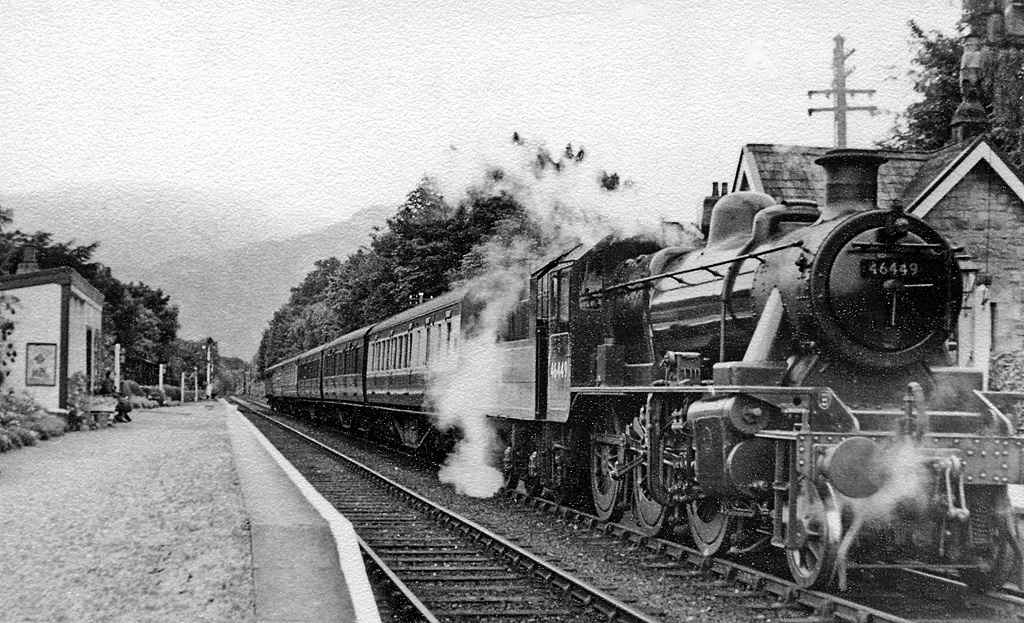
- View eastward, towards Keswick and Penrith in 1951

General information
- Location: Cumberland; England
- Coordinates: 54.668°N 3.243°W
- Platforms: 2

Other information
- Status: Disused

History
- Original company: Cockermouth, Keswick and Penrith Railway
- Pre-grouping: Cockermouth, Keswick and Penrith Railway
- Post-grouping: London, Midland and Scottish Railway

Key dates
- 2 January 1865: Station opened
- 18 April 1966: Station closed
Location

Bassenthwaite Lake railway station was situated on the Cockermouth, Keswick and Penrith Railway between Penrith and Cockermouth in Cumbria, England. The station served the village of Dubwath.

The station opened to passenger traffic on 2 January 1865, and closed on 18 April 1966. A camping coach was positioned here by the London Midland Region in 1954 this was increased to three coaches in 1955 and then two coaches from 1956 to 1964.

The station building and one platform are still visible from the A66 through the trees although the station fell into a state of disrepair and lost its roof. The Station Master's house remains on the side of the A66 but the east bound platform and goods yards are now part of the road.

In 2019 a replica French-style steam locomotive with Wagons-Lits carriages used in the 2017 film of Murder on the Orient Express were installed on the site as part of a tourist development. The station building has been renovated and is used as a cafe and events venue along with the replica train. The food writer Grace Dent included it in her "favourite restaurants of 2022", saying "the afternoon tea is incapacitating and is served in a gorgeous replica French steam train".

Preceding station	Disused railways	Following station
Embleton	Cockermouth, Keswick and Penrith Railway	Braithwaite
