= Brent railway station =

Disused railway station in Devon, England

Brent
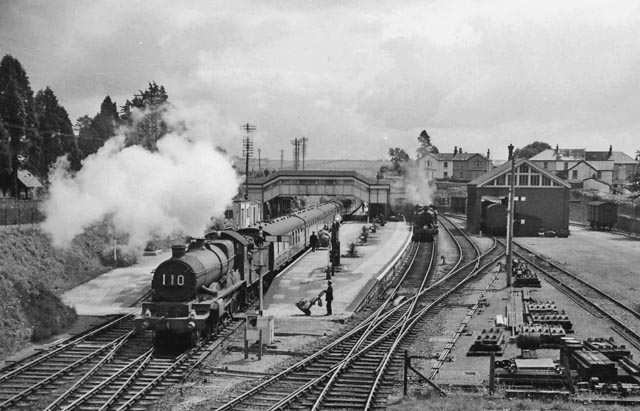
- The station in 1958

General information
- Location: South Brent, South Hams; England
- Platforms: 3

Other information
- Status: Disused

History
- Original company: South Devon Railway
- Pre-grouping: Great Western Railway
- Post-grouping: Great Western Railway

Key dates
- 15 June 1848: Opened
- 5 October 1964: Closed
Location

Brent railway station was a stop on the South Devon Railway; it served the village of South Brent on the southern edge of Dartmoor in Devon, England.

== History ==
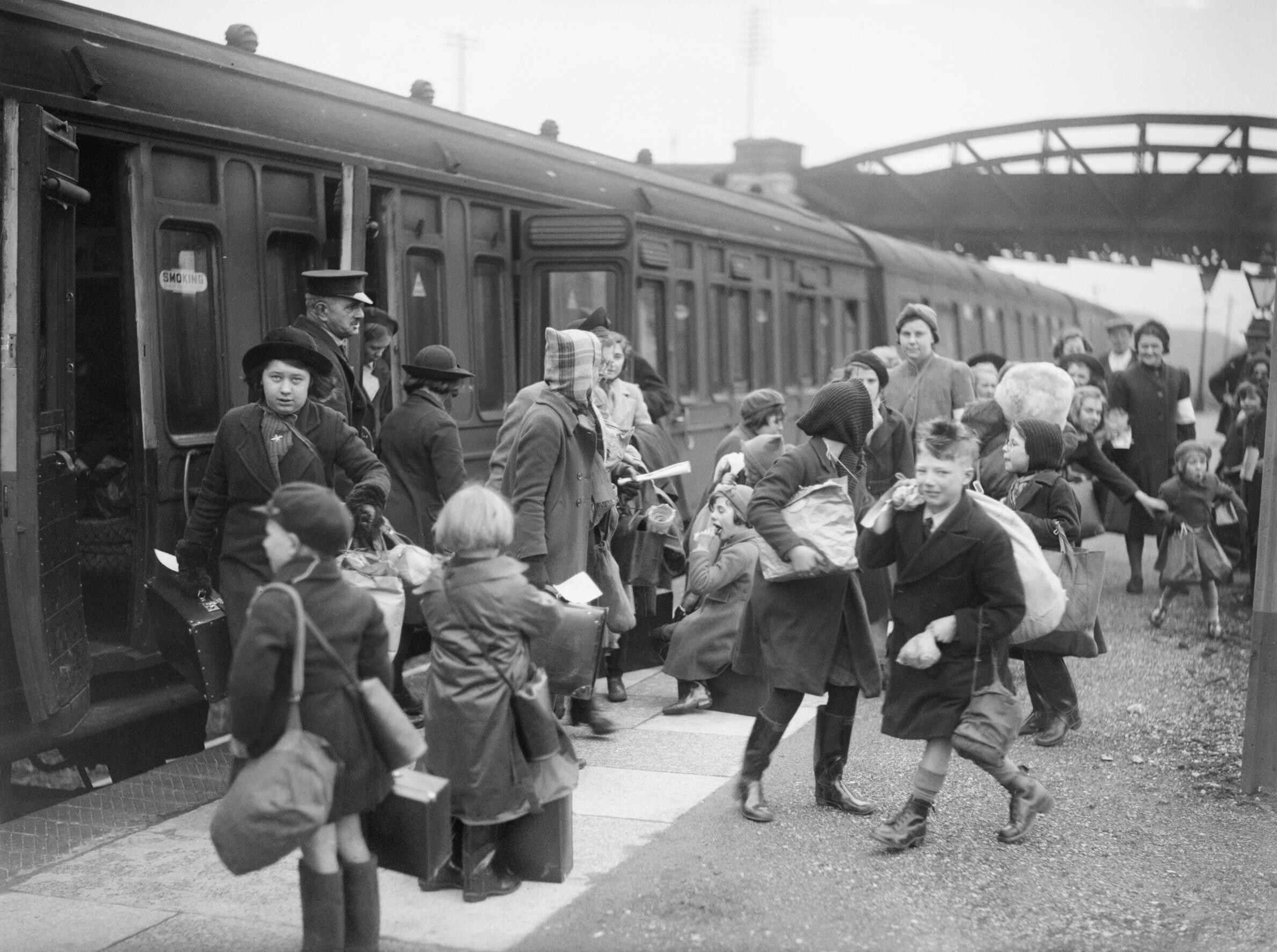
Child evacuees arrive at Brent station, after being evacuated from Bristol in 1940

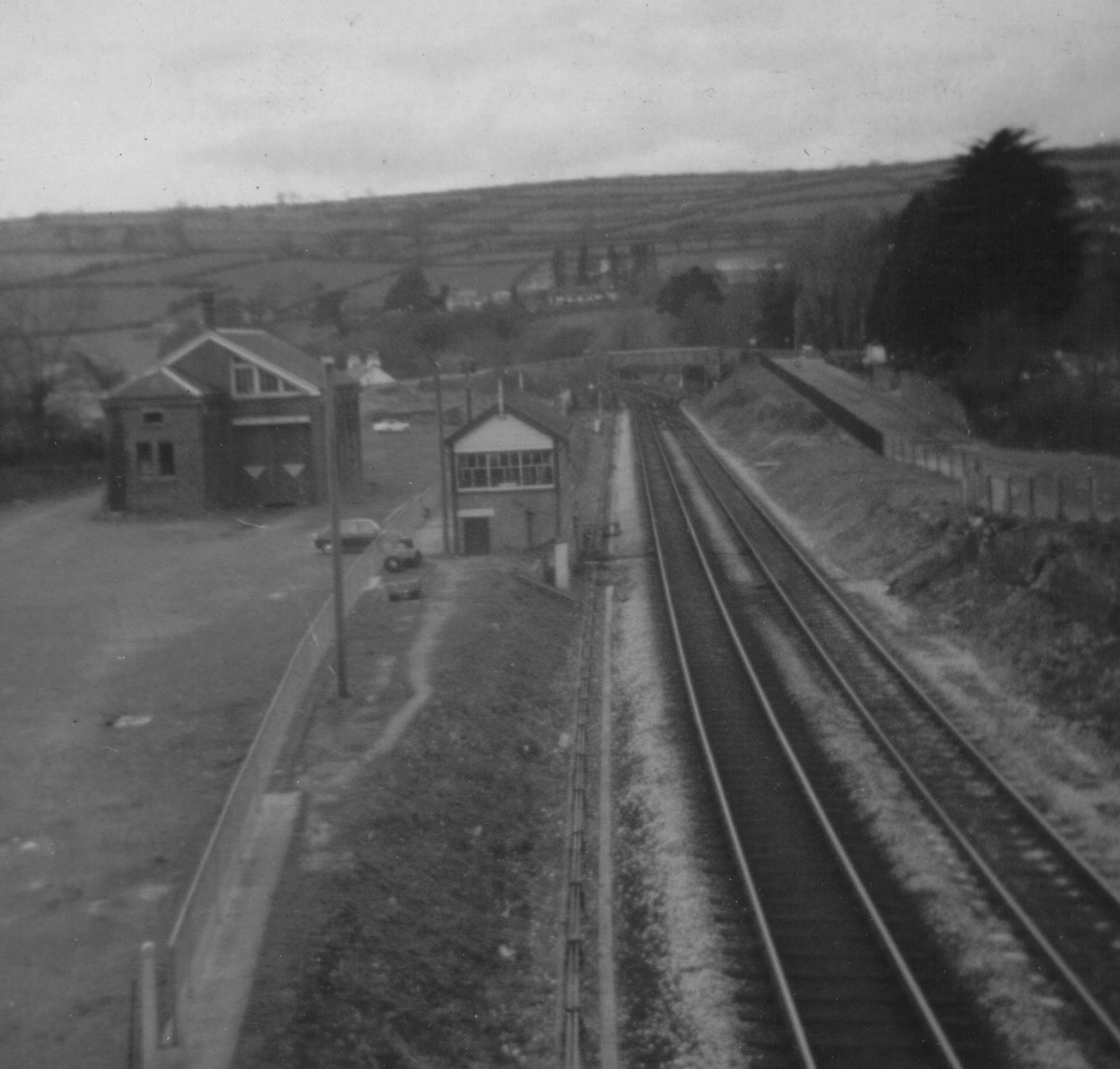
The Brent station site on the South Devon Main Line in 1971

The line through Brent opened on 5 May 1848, but the station was not ready to open until 15 June 1848.

The South Devon Railway was amalgamated with the Great Western Railway on 1 February 1876. On 19 December 1893, the station became a junction with the opening of the Kingsbridge branch line.

The station closed in 1964.

Preceding station	Disused railways	Following station
Wrangaton	Great Western Railway; Exeter–Plymouth line	Totnes
Terminus	Great Western Railway; Kingsbridge branch line	Avonwick
