= Hayburn Wyke railway station =

Former railway station in the North Riding of Yorkshire, England

Hayburn Wyke
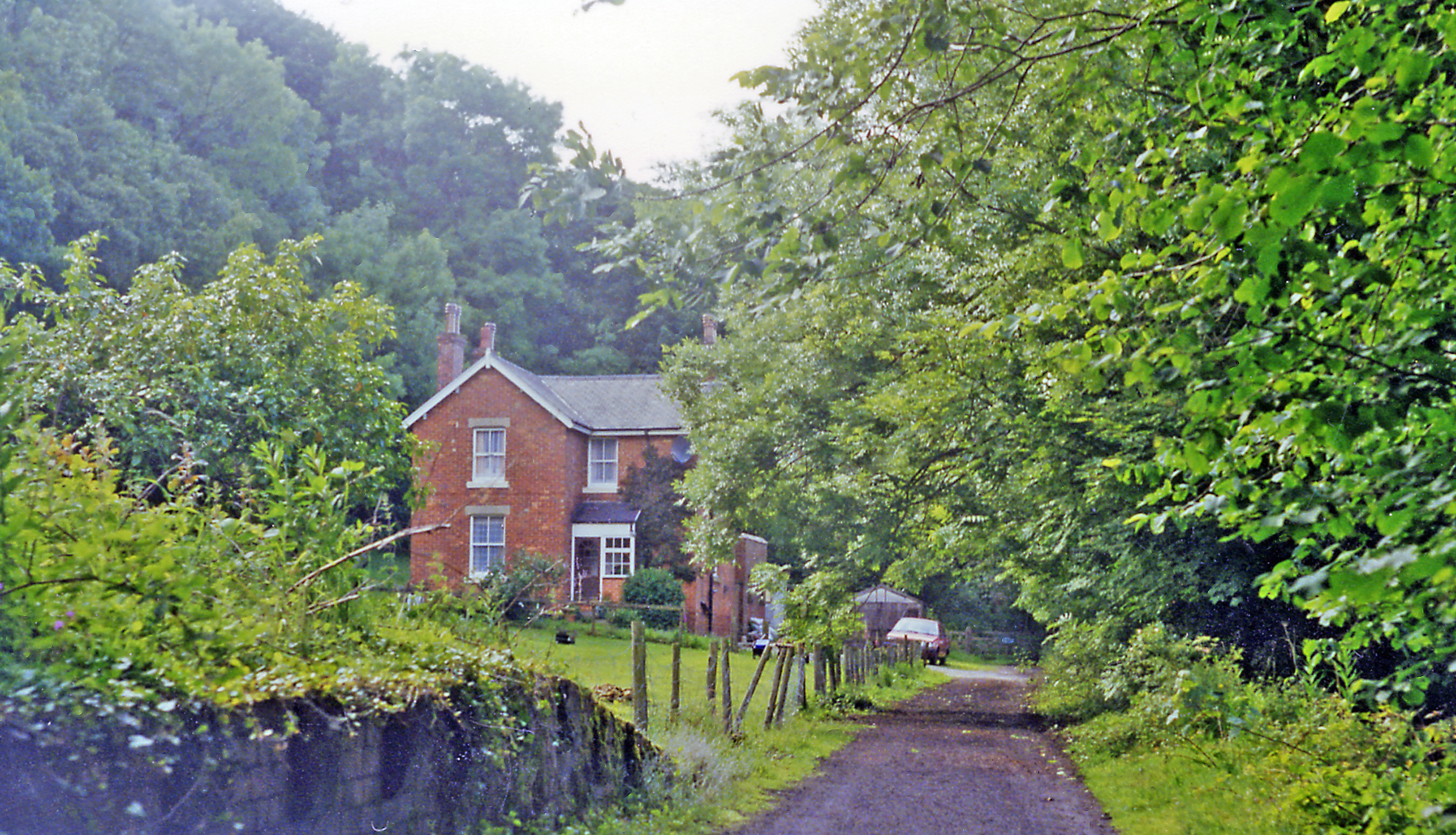
- Stationmaster's house at the former Hayburn Wyke station (1997)

General information
- Location: Hayburn Wyke, North Yorkshire; England
- Coordinates: 54.356985°N 0.452300°W
- Grid reference: TA006968
- Platforms: 1

Other information
- Status: Disused

History
- Original company: Scarborough and Whitby Railway
- Pre-grouping: North Eastern Railway
- Post-grouping: London and North Eastern Railway

Key dates
- 1885: Opened
- 1917: Closed
- 1921: Opened
- 1965: Closed
Location

Hayburn Wyke railway station was a railway station on the Scarborough & Whitby Railway, 7 miles (11 km) north from Scarborough. It served the popular local beauty spot of Hayburn Wyke, and the adjacent Hayburn Wyke Hotel, and was situated in the civil parish of Cloughton.

The Cinder Track, a multi-user path used by walkers, cyclists and horse-riders, passes through the station on the line of the old railway, whilst the Cleveland Way long-distance footpath passes just to the east.

== History ==
The station opened on 16 July 1885. The platform was originally on the up side of the line, but was moved to the down side on request of the NER, who objected to the design of the wooden station being on a steep slope. The NER wanted a more "substantial station." The station only ever consisted of one track and one platform; all goods traffic was handled at Staintondale. The station was on an uphill gradient northwards; the climb to Ravenscar station began at Cloughton at 1-in-90 and at Hayburn Wyke, its ascent was 1-in-71.

The station was rebuilt in 1893, and closed temporarily on 1 March 1917. Reopening took place on 2 May 1921 before final, permanent closure on 8 March 1965. From 1955 the station was reduced to an unstaffed halt. In July 1885 upon opening, the timetable afforded four stops in each direction (north and south) at Hayburn Wyke, with trains taking 50 minutes to reach Whitby, and 20 minutes to reach Scarborough. The 1922 timetable shows the station had nine northbound and ten southbound stopping trains. At least three of theses either started or terminated at Saltburn, going via the Whitby, Redcar and Middlesbrough Union Railway. In 1958 after many services had been replaced by diesel-multiple-units, the station had four services each way on weekdays but the first services did not arrive at Hayburn until 09:41 southwards, and 12:08 northwards. Services in the summer if 1962 were slightly better with seven workings, with some going on to Middlesbrough via the Esk Valley Line.

In June 1957, a van was using the level crossing, (which had been unstaffed since station personnel were withdrawn two years earlier) when it was hit by a goods train and shunted 200 yards (180 m) along the track. The two occupants of the van died in the accident. This was the most serious accident to occur on the Scarborough & Whitby railway. The former stationmaster's house dating back to 1892, which stands parallel to the former line, survives as a private residence. For some time after the station was unstaffed, the station buildings were used as a camping location.

== Bibliography ==
- Chapman, Stephen (2008). York to Scarborough Whitby & Ryedale. Bellcode Books. ISBN 978-1-871233-19-3.
- Lidster, Robin (2010). Scarborough & Whitby Railway through time. Stroud: Amberley Publishing. ISBN 978-1-84868-668-7.

Preceding station	Disused railways	Following station
Cloughton; Line and station closed	North Eastern Railway; Scarborough & Whitby Railway	Staintondale; Line and station closed
