= Aberlady, Gullane and North Berwick Railway =

Former railway line in Scotland

Coordinates: 56.02975°N 2.83173°W

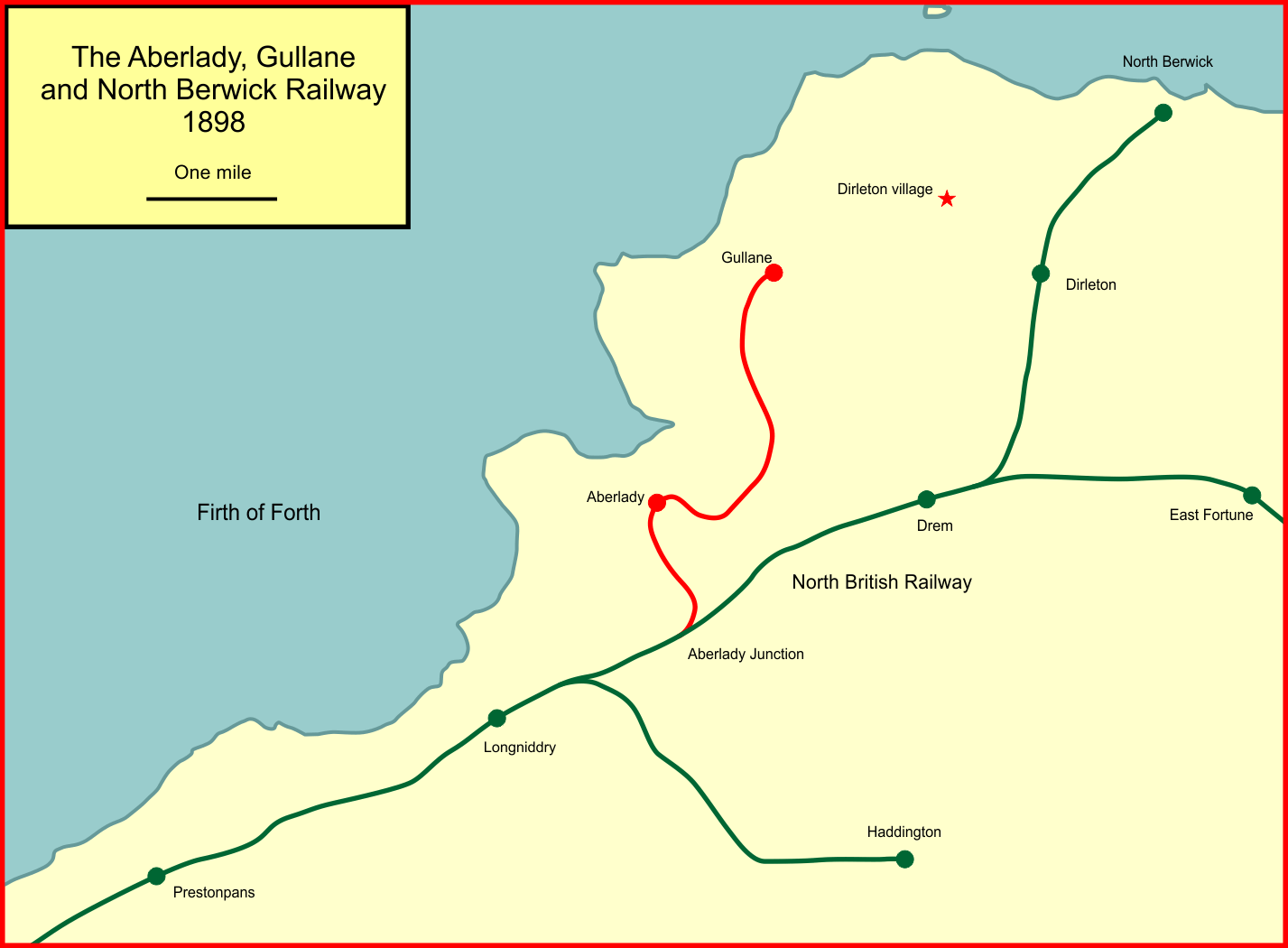

Overview
- Locale: Scotland
- Dates of operation: 24 August 1898–6 August 1900
- Successor: North British Railway

Technical
- Track gauge: 4 ft 8 1/2 in (1,435 mm)
- Length: 4 3/4 miles (7.6 km)

The Aberlady, Gullane and North Berwick Railway was promoted independently to develop settlements between Longniddry and North Berwick in East Lothian, Scotland. It opened its line from a junction near Longniddry as far as Gullane in 1898, but never succeeded in financial terms, and it never completed its line to North Berwick, which already had a branch railway.

It closed to passengers in 1932 and continued, partly due to sugar beet traffic, until closing completely in 1964.

== Formation ==
In 1850 the North British Railway opened a branch line from Drem station, on its main line to Berwick, to North Berwick. The North British hoped that it would develop the town as a superior residential area, for people with daily business in Edinburgh. That trade was slower to build up than the NBR intended, but the focus on golf as a pastime, and on the increase of visits to resort locations, led to the eventual establishment of the branch as a useful asset to the company.

Settlements to the west relied on road connection to the main line for travel to Edinburgh for many years, but in 1892 a scheme was promoted for a new railway branch from Longniddry, on the main line railway, to North Berwick, running through Aberlady, Luffness and Gullane. The proposed line was independently supported, although the North British Railway were favourably disposed in the background. However, when the bill for the Aberlady, Gullane and North Berwick Railway was presented, the North British Railway objected, as did a local landowner, Walter Hope, who saw that his farm and house would be prejudicially affected by the proximity of the course of the line. The NBR now saw that the line running through to North Berwick would abstract business from their own line.

Aberlady, Gullane and North Berwick Railway Act 1893
- Act of Parliament
- Parliament of the United Kingdom
- Long title: An Act for incorporating the Aberlady Gullane and North Berwick Railway Company and authorising the construction of railways in the county of Haddington and for other purposes.
- Citation: 56 & 57 Vict. c. cxcix

Dates
- Royal assent: 24 August 1893

Text of statute as originally enacted

Negotiations followed and the proposed route of the line was modified to satisfy Hope, and discussion with the North British Railway resulted in their agreeing to work the line for 50% of receipts, guaranteeing a 4.5% dividend on the company's capital of £66,000. The Aberlady, Gullane and North Berwick Railway Act 1893 (56 & 57 Vict. c. cxcix) received royal assent on 24 August 1893; (Note: Hajducki and Smith & Anderson; Carter says 28 August.) the act specified that the line could not be extended through from Gullane to North Berwick without the consent of the NBR.

The practical benefit of the line was simply to connect some minor villages to the railway, and when subscriptions for shares were sought, it proved very difficult to generate financial commitment. Indeed, four years after the passage of the act of Parliament, the company was still unable to pay the expenses to witnesses at the parliamentary hearings. Preference shares were issued and finally by September 1898 sufficient capital had been acquired to finish the line. A contract for construction had been let in 1896.

== Opening ==
The construction was completed, between Spittal (where the junction was named Aberlady Junction, a mile and a half east of Longniddry) and Gullane, and the line opened on 1 April 1898. The signalling on the single line branch was by the Tyers electric tablet system. (Note: From Hajducki, page 158; but he implies one train only working from Aberlady; he refers to "the Aberlady and Gullane no. 0 staff"; but this may simply be a matter of phraseology.) The train service was lavish, at nine passenger trains each way daily, with additional trains on summer Saturdays.

== Absorption ==
The North British Railway were paying 4.5% to the shareholders of the little line, and operating it too; on 14 October 1899 they wrote to the Aberlady company offering to purchase it by exchange of shares in the NBR. This was agreed and on 6 August 1900 the North British Railway (General Powers) Act 1900 (63 & 64 Vict. c. ccix) was passed which authorised the transfer. (Note: Paterson gives 1 August 1890, but this is a mistake.) The terms were controversial: a shareholder named James Calder pointed out that the market value of the North British Railway shares given in exchange for the Aberlady shares was £123,885 for shares that had cost £88,000, giving a considerable profit to Aberlady shareholders, the largest of whom were North British Railway directors.

The Edwardian era brought a considerable increase in leisure travel to the area; this included the popular practice of taking a house for rent in the summer months and travelling daily to Edinburgh or Glasgow, while the family remained in the resort; and also the increased popularity of golf, and of travelling considerable distances to a resort location to play it. A small station was opened at Luffness to serve an adjacent course on 1 September 1903; use of the station was restricted to players at the golf course.

== The Lothian Coast Express ==
Responding to these developments the North British Railway put on a train service named The Lothian Coast Express. This started running on 3 or 12 June 1912; in the down direction it ran from Dunbar, taking a North Berwick portion at Drem and attaching a Gullane portion at Longniddry. The train ran through to Glasgow, stopping at Edinburgh Waverley, (Note: Ross states on page 214 that it ran through Waverley without stopping, the only scheduled train to do so; but Paterson gives Edinburgh calling times in both directions, on page 94. Ross and Paterson may be referring to different eras, before and after the War.) and conveyed a breakfast car. The up direction train in the afternoon conveyed a tea car. The train was said to have been the first British named train to carry a headboard with the train name.

== Proposals to extend to North Berwick ==
In 1915 there was a remarkable development, in which residents of Aberlady and Gullane presented a petition to the North British Railway urging the construction of the line between Gullane and North Berwick. This had been authorised in the original Aberlady, Gullane and North Berwick Railway Act 1893 (56 & 57 Vict. c. cxcix), although the powers had long since lapsed. The arguments they pressed emphasised the development of a backward district, and the unification of branch connections at Longniddry, although they did not say whether they proposed that the Drem to North Berwick line should be closed. The North British directors carefully considered the idea, but the fact of World War I being in progress, and the obvious rise of road motor vehicles in serving sparsely populated rural areas, and the undeveloped nature of the intervening terrain, meant that the proposal was politely put in abeyance.

== From 1923 ==
In 1923 the North British Railway was made a constituent of the new London and North Eastern Railway (LNER) under the "grouping" of the main line railways of Great Britain, following the Railways Act 1921.

From 1923 road scheduled public passenger transport started operation in the area, and in later years it became a powerful competitor, having many advantages over the branch railway service. Aberlady and Gullane were never commercially buoyant locations: in 1932 Aberlady station was handling ten passengers a week. The Golf Platform at Luffness had lost its custom too, as the well-heeled golfers used their own motor cars, and it closed on 1 June 1931. From 7 May 1929 the branch was reduced to the one train only system of operation, with the signal boxes at Aberlady and Gullane closed. These economies were insignificant in comparison with the loss which the line was making, and the LNER announced that the passenger service would be discontinued from 12 September 1932.

Goods traffic continued, but it too declined substantially in volume as road alternatives became increasingly practicable. In fact only the continuation of sugar beet traffic sustained the branch. During World War II it had been impossible to import cane sugar, and many farmers turned to sugar beet. The product was conveyed by rail to a processing plant in Cupar, Fife. In the 1960s the competitive advantage of sugar beet declined, and on 15 June 1964 the last goods train trip operated.

== Topography ==
- Aberlady Junction;
- Aberlady; opened 1 April 1898; closed 12 September 1932;
- Luffness; golfers; opened 1 September 1903; closed 1 June 1931
- Gullane; opened 1 April 1898; closed 12 September 1932.
