= Falsgrave =

Area of Scarborough, North Yorkshire, England

Coordinates: 54.276°N 0.415°W

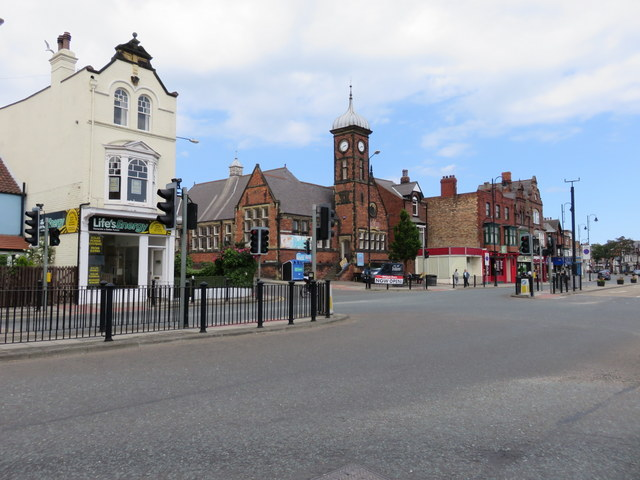
- Falsgrave Road looking west

- Location within North Yorkshire
- OS grid reference: TA032875
- Civil parish: Scarborough
- Unitary authority: North Yorkshire
- Ceremonial county: North Yorkshire
- Region: Yorkshire and the Humber
- Country: England
- Sovereign state: United Kingdom
- Post town: SCARBOROUGH
- Postcode district: YO12
- Police: North Yorkshire
- Fire: North Yorkshire
- Ambulance: Yorkshire
- UK Parliament: Scarborough and Whitby

Falsgrave is an area of Scarborough in North Yorkshire, England. The settlement pre-dates the Domesday Book survey and was the manor which Scarborough belonged to. Gradually the settlements importance inverted, the area now a south west continuation of shops from the town centre street of Westborough. Parts of the area were designated as a conservation area in 1985. It is also where the A170 (to Thirsk) and A171 (to Middlesbrough) roads meet.

== History ==
Falsgrave is recorded in the Domesday Book as being in the wapentake of Dic (later Pickering Lythe), with twenty villagers and belonging to King William, though at the Conquest, it was the property of Earl Morcar, who had ousted Tosti in 1065. During the Harrying of the North between 1069 and 1071, most of the Manor of Falsgrave was laid to waste, though to what extent is unknown especially in relation to the coastal areas. Domesday recorded the name as Walesgrif, which means Pit or hollow by the hill. The first part derives from Old Norse Hvalr (a personal name), and the second part is from the same language gryfia meaning pit. In 1086, the area was owned by King William, but its value, and the number of ploughs, had depreciated. Around 1106, the area became part of what was known as the wapentake of Pickering Lythe. Scarborough developed separately from Falsgrave, however in 1201, King John granted 60 acres (24 ha) of fields to the newer settlement from Falsgrave.

The Manor of Falsgrave was historically an extensive and important administrative manor in the area, with lands stretching as far north as Staintondale, as far south as Filey, and as far west as Wykeham (Steintun, Fieulac and Wicham respectively in the Domesday survey). (Note: At the Domesday survey, the manor of Falsgrave was a Royal manor within the Wapentake of Dic (later the Wapentake of Pickering Lythe).) The Manor of Falsgrave had 21 villages under its legal control (known as soke in Medieval times. In 1256, King Henry III enacted a charter that stated "..to the burgesses of Escardeburgh [Scarborough], the enlargement of the said borough, by adding the Manor of Whallesgrave [Falsgrave], with all the lands, pastures, mills, pools, and all other things to the same manor belonging..." However, in 1377, King Richard II issued an edict so that Walesgrif would be annexed to the town of Scarborough, ceasing its status as a village, and eventually becoming a suburb of Scarborough.

Falsgrave Inclosure Act 1773
- Act of Parliament
- Parliament of Great Britain
- Long title: An Act for dividing and enclosing the Open Commons and Waste Grounds, within the Manor and Township of Walsgrave otherwise Falsgrave, in the Parish of Scarborough, in the North Riding of the County of York.
- Citation: 13 Geo. 3. c. 59 Pr.
- Territorial extent: Great Britain

Dates
- Royal assent: 7 April 1773
- Commencement: 26 November 1772 (Note: Start of session.)

Status: Current legislation

In 1624, a bond was agreed between the town of Scarborough and one George Fletcher (a plumber) to maintain a steady flow of water from Falsgrave through a lead pipe to the town. However, during the English Civil War, the pipe was plundered by soldiers and needed frequent replacement. During 1648, Falsgrave was where the Parliamentarian side gathered to besiege the Royalists in Scarborough Castle. They succeeded in December 1648. The nearby hills of Falsgrave Moor (or Common), were enclosed in 1774 by the Falsgrave Inclosure Act 1773 (13 Geo. 3. c. 59 Pr.).

In December 1914, during the First World War raid on Scarborough, several shells fire from German ships out at sea rained down on Falsgrave including the park. There were no reports of casualties, but many areas suffered significant damage.

=== Conservation area ===
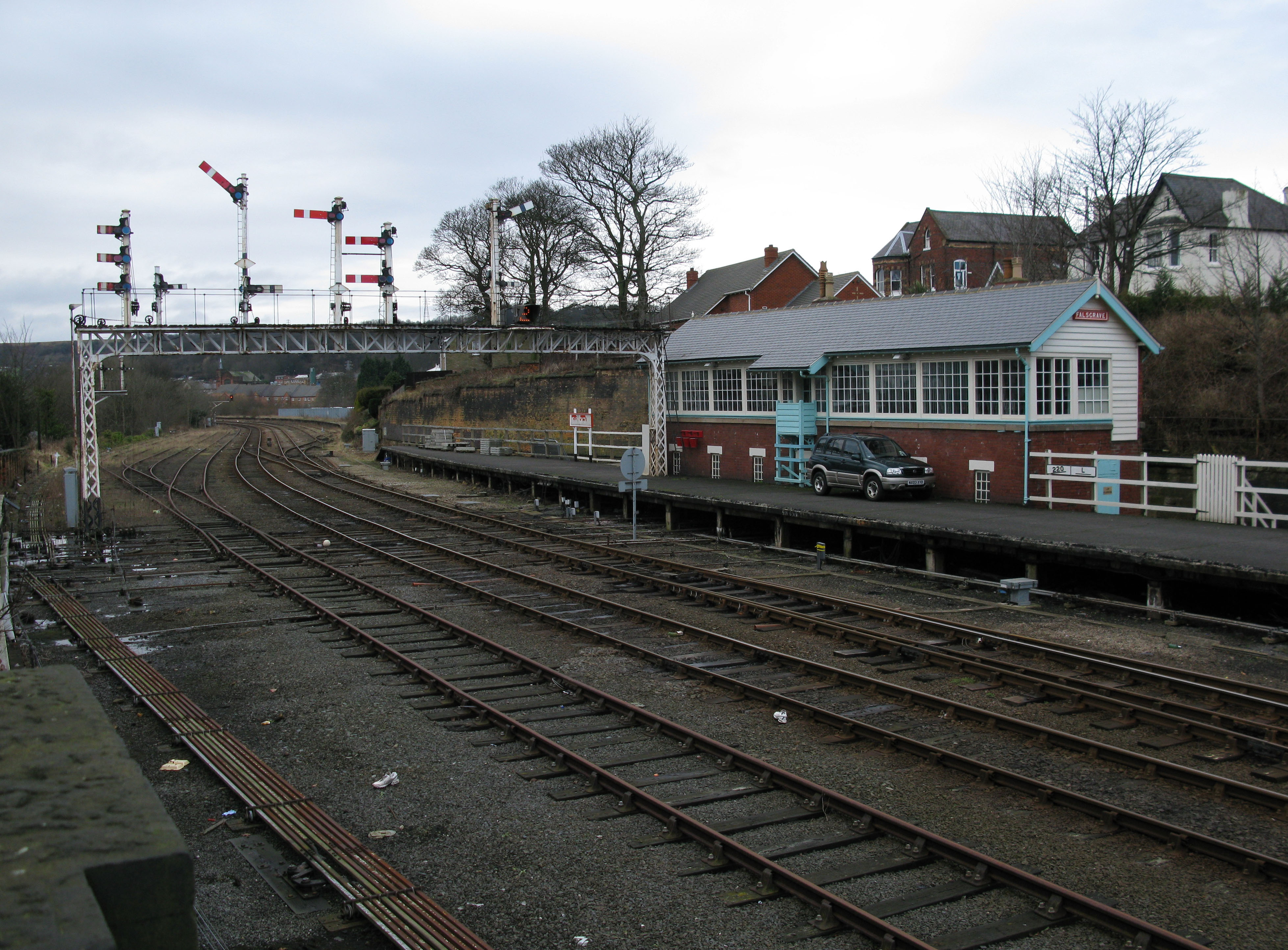
Falsgrave Signal Box. The gantry was moved to the NYMR in 2010

In 1985, part of the suburb of Falsgrave were approved into a conservation area. It includes 22 listed buildings, including ten sets, or rows, of houses, a railway signal box, and three public houses. The signal gantry on the approach was moved to Grosmont railway station in 2010; it is still a listed structure.

Numbers 9 and 10 Falsgrave Road were originally part of a group of six houses known as Hinderwell Place. The house on the far west of this sequence of buildings was purchased by the Scarborough and Whitby Railway company upon the building of Falsgrave Tunnel underneath it. The vibrations from construction and passing trains was considered too great to leave the building occupied, and it was demolished in 1890, and where it was is now the road access to the supermarket built upon Gallows Close goods yard, which was at the northern portal of Falsgrave Tunnel. The rest of the terraced Hinderwell Place had been demolished by 1891, to make way for newer buildings. On the opposite side of the road where the Londesborough Road diverges, was a row of Georgian terrace houses known as Victoria Place, which according to the census returns of 1851, was occupied by the Leisured Class. This denoted that they were supported by incomes from investments and property portfolios, with most houses employing servants such as cooks, housemaids and general servants.

== Transport ==
A turnpike was authorised and was built in 1752 connecting York with Scarborough via Malton, Yedingham Bridge, Snainton and Ayton, to travel through Falsgrave along what is now the A170 road. There are three main routes that converge in Falsgrave; the A64 from York, the A170 from Thirsk, and the A171 from Whitby.

Railways arrived through the area between 1845 and 1885, without a railway station being built, as the main railway station at Scarborough is only 1 mile (1.6 km) away to the east. (Note: Scarborough Londesborough Road railway station opened in 1908 after Falsgrave had been subsumed into Scarborough, but the railway station was only for the use of excursion and holiday traffic to and from Scarborough, as opposed to an amenity for the residents of Falsgrave.) A tram system was developed by the Scarborough Tramways Company in 1904 which ran up Falsgrave Road and through Scarborough town centre. The tram system closed in 1931.

A wide variety of buses stop in Falsgrave to and from Scarborough going to Bridlington, Helmsley, Leeds, Pickering, and Whitby, alongside local services within the immediate area.

== Amenities ==
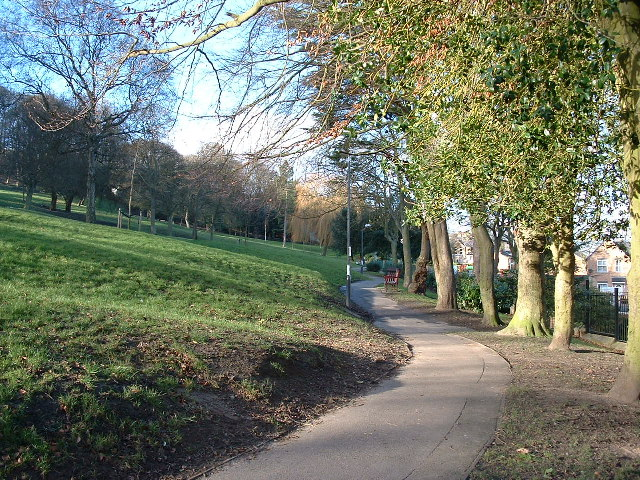
Falsgrave Park

Ramsdale Valley, which feeds water from Scarbrough Mere through Ramsdale Beck to the South Bay in Scarborough, had at least three watermills on it. However, the flow was sporadic, especially during the summer season, so often farmers had to use other mills at Cayton and Scalby. At least one of the mills was in use in the year 1201, and at least four were in operation by 1320. the last of which was demolished during the Civil War.

Falsgrave Park is to the south-west of the A170 road in Falsgrave. The area was first mentioned in 1283 when Robert of Scarborough suggested bringing the waters from springs in the area into the town of Scarborough. The highest point in the park was once the location of springs which fed clean water into Scarborough, taking advantage of the natural sloping topography to drain effectively towards the bay. The park has been awarded Green Flag status and has walks, woodlands, play areas, dog-free and dog-walking areas, a wildflower meadow and a stone circle, which was built in 2003.

The Anglican church in Falsgrave, St James with Holy Trinity Church, is on what is now the A64 road heading south, was built in 1885, though its ecclesiastical parish was not formed util 1893. Originally the parish was just Holy Trinity and extended from Valley Road eastwards across the railway to Oliver's Mount. However, Medieval maps show Falsgrave as having a church, but it is unsure where it was located or its style of architecture. A reference from 1496 states that a Thomas Saye of Scardeburgh left three shillings and 10 pence to "St. Clements Church, in Walegriff." (Note: A Medieval map shows the location of the church in Falsgrave to be north of the present A170 road, and east of the A171 road. The current church is on the A64, to the south.) It has been suggested that the church used to be located on Chapel Street, which was built over and became known as Westbourne Park. Originally of the Catholic faith, the church was a daughter church of St Mary's Church in Scarborough.

The first purpose-built Anglican church in the area was the Church of All Saints, located on All Saints Road, just off the south side of Falsgrave Road built in 1868. The rising population of the suburb prompted the vicar of St Mary's Church in Scarborough to build a daughter church in Faslgrave. The church was built in 1867, consecrated in 1868 by the archbishop of York, but it was not the seat of an ecclesiastical parish until 1875. The population of the ecclesiastical parish in 1881 was 7,650. All saints was demolished in 1975.

A Unitarian church was built on Victoria Parade and Falsgrave Road in 1877. Upon opening, the Anglican vicar of the nearby All Saints Church preached that Unitarianism was a "terrible heresy". The building is still there, but after a fire in 1995, most it has been converted into flats, with a small area still used for Unitarian worship.

There are two primary schools in the area; Gladstone Road Primary and Thomas Hinderwell Primary Academy. There is also an upper school, St Augustine's Catholic School, which converted to Academy Status in 2019.

== Governance ==
Historically Falsgrave was a settlement in its own right, with the border between Falsgrave and Scarborough following a beck along what is now Gladstone Road and Columbus Ravine in the town. It was a township within Scarborough parish from 1377 onwards, in 1866 Falsgrave became a separate civil parish, in 1900 the parish was abolished. In 1801 the population was 279, rising to 357 in 1811, but dropping to 345 in 1821. Thereafter it increased each census year being 391 in 1831, 545 in 1841, 757 in 1851, 1,173 in 1861, 1868 in 1871, and 4,266 in 1881. The area is represented at Westminster as part of the Scarborough and Whitby constituency. Until 1974 it was in the North Riding of Yorkshire, from 1974 to 2023 it was in Scarborough non-metropolitan district.

One of the modern day wards of Scarborough was named Falsgrave Park Ward, and followed an outline of the railway line in the east, through the A170 on the west, and just encompassing the park and ride area on Seamer Road. The A64 junction and the A170 also formed the northern boundary. In the local elections of May 2019, the ward was merged with Stepney Ward (immediately to the north), and named Falsgrave & Stepney Ward. The population of the new ward in December 2020 was 9,236.

== Sources ==
- Baker, James (1882). The history of Scarbrough, from the earliest date. London: Long man's Green & Co. OCLC 4453848.
- Brigham, T.; Buglass, J. (2015). "Rapid Coastal Zone Assessment Survey Yorkshire and Lincolnshire: Phase 3 Field Survey and Historical Assessment". Rapid Coastal Zone Assessment Survey Yorkshire. Historic England. doi:10.5284/1046207.
- Falsgrave Conservation Area (PDF). scarborough.gov.uk (Report). Scarborough Borough Council. 3 November 2008.
- Leese-Layton, D. E. (1982). "Falsgrave; its early development as a suburb of Scarborough". Transactions of the Scarborough and District Archaeological Society (24). Scarborough: Scarborough Archaeological and Historical Society. ISSN 1474-1229. OCLC 2324885.
- Page, William (1968). The Victoria history of the county of York, North Riding. London: Dawsons of Pall Mall for the University of London Institute of Historical Research. ISBN 0712903100.
- Rushton, John (2010). "The Norman recovery in the Falsgrave Hundred". Transactions of the Scarborough and District Archaeological Society (43). Scarborough: Scarborough Archaeological and Historical Society. ISSN 1474-1229. OCLC 2324885.
