= Prospect Hill Junction =

Former railway junction in North Yorkshire, England

Coordinates: 54.480°N 0.621°W

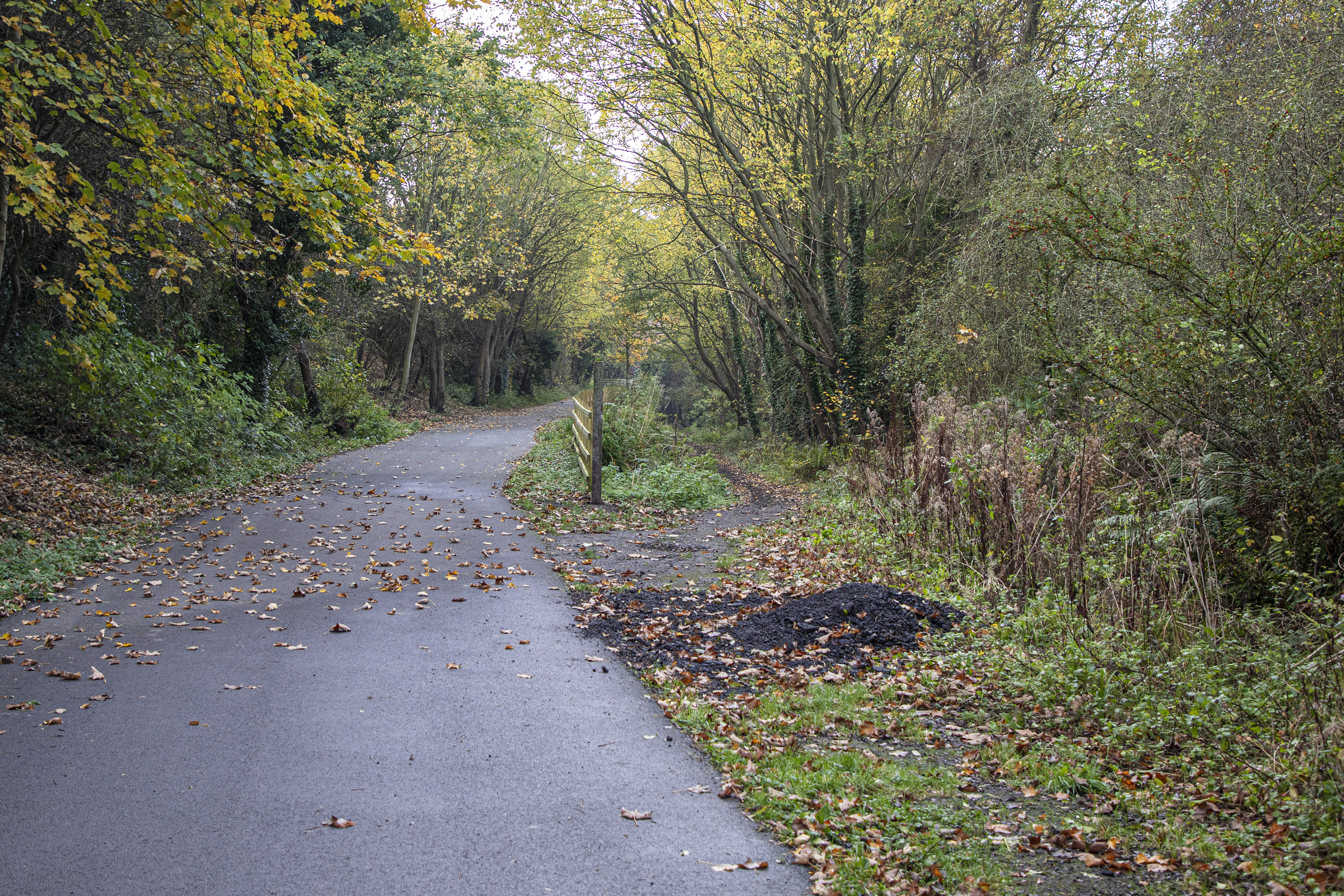
Prospect Hill Junction in Whitby, looking south

Prospect Hill Junction was a railway junction in Whitby, North Yorkshire, England. The junction had access to the line into Whitby Town railway station, Whitby West Cliff railway station (and beyond to Loftus), and also to the Scarborough line, which went south across Larpool Viaduct. It first saw traffic in December 1883, but did not open as a junction until 1885. It was closed to passenger and freight traffic in March 1965, though the lines were not lifted until 1973.

== History ==
Prospect Hill Junction controlled access to the Scarborough line from Whitby, the line through to Loftus, and the line connecting Whitby Town railway station to Whitby West Cliff. The signal box controlling the junction, straddled the line to and from Whitby Town, and was 1 mile 15 chains (1.9 km) from the Town railway station, and 47 chains (3,100 ft; 950 m) from West Cliff station. The gradient from Bog Hall Junction to Prospect Hill Junction was a 1-in-50, with the section to West Cliff Railway station being at a 1-in-60 to start with, before levelling out to a 1-in-165. The name Prospect Hill derives from the view afforded across the harbour and River Esk mouth at Whitby. Before the town was built up, sailors would visit the site to take in the view. Services past the site started in 1883, but it did not become a junction until the opening of the Scarborough and Whitby Line in 1885, and at the same time, the signal box was commissioned. The junction was in a deep cutting, with the signal box being about 20 square feet (1.9 m^{2}) square, with windows on three sides; the windowless side backed onto the western edge of the cutting. The next signal boxes were located at; Whitby West Cliff 1,223 yards (1,118 m), Robin Hood's Bay 5 miles 1,248 yards (9.188 km), and Bog Hall Junction 1,485 yards (1,358 m).

On 16 December 1914, the signal and telegraph function controlled from the signal box failed, after it was shelled by the German Navy in the Raid on Scarborough, Hartlepool and Whitby.

Due to the nature of the railway layout at Whitby, some trains direct from Teesside to Scarborough dropped down the hill to Whitby Town, then came back up to reverse, and onwards to Scarborough. At other times, they bypassed Whitby Town, and a shuttle service ran between the two Whitby stations. This kept Prospect Hill Junction signal box busy. One of the curiosities of Prospect Hill Junction, was that the rail directions changed over at the junction. Trains leaving Scarborough going north, were deemed to be going down, but when they reached Prospect Hill Junction, the direction changed to up, as Middlesbrough was the eventual, and larger destination. This process also ran in a vice-versa format for southbound trains. The problems of trains having to reverse was partly alleviated in 1955, when a new regulation was introduced which allowed trains of two carriages to be propelled up the connecting line between Whitby Town and West Cliff. The train was only allowed to proceed at 10 miles per hour (16 km/h), but it removed the necessity for the locomotive to run around at either location. The crossing loop at Prospect Hill could accommodate a steam engine, brake van and 14 standard wagons.

Whilst services to Saltburn via Loftus were withdrawn in May 1958, (closing the line north of West Cliff railway station), the line remained open beyond Prospect Hill Junction to West Cliff station until June 1961. Thereafter, services between Scarborough and Whitby Town reversed at Prospect Hill until March 1965, when the last passenger train used the junction. The line between Haswker and Prospect Hill was not removed until 1973; the 2 3/4 miles (4.4 km) section was left in-situ for the proposed potash traffic, which never happened as mining was centred at Boulby further up the coast. However, the signal box was subject to vandalism, and was destroyed by fire in 1971. The route through Prospect Hill has been converted into a walking, cycling and bridle trail, part of the Cinder Track across Larpool Viaduct as well as National Cycle Network route 1, and also down the hill on the Prospect Hill line towards, but not arriving at, Bog Hall.

== Accidents ==
On 29 December 1920, a locomotive was working a goods train from Scarborough to Whitby and after running around its single van, it left to go down the hill towards Whitby Town. The signaller noticed the van had been left behind, so motioned to the driver to come to a halt, which he did. However, gravity allowed the van to move down the grade and to crashed into the rear of the stationary locomotive and the shattering glass cut the guard's face.

In August 1937, a J39 locomotive derailed at the junction. The train was working northwards from Scarborough, when the weight of the locomotive caused the track to spread, derailing the train. There were no reported casualties or injuries, however, this saw the class banned from the Yorkshire coastal lines because of its weight.
