= Ravenscar, North Yorkshire =

Village in North Yorkshire, England

Coordinates: 54°23′53″N 0°29′32″W

Ravenscar
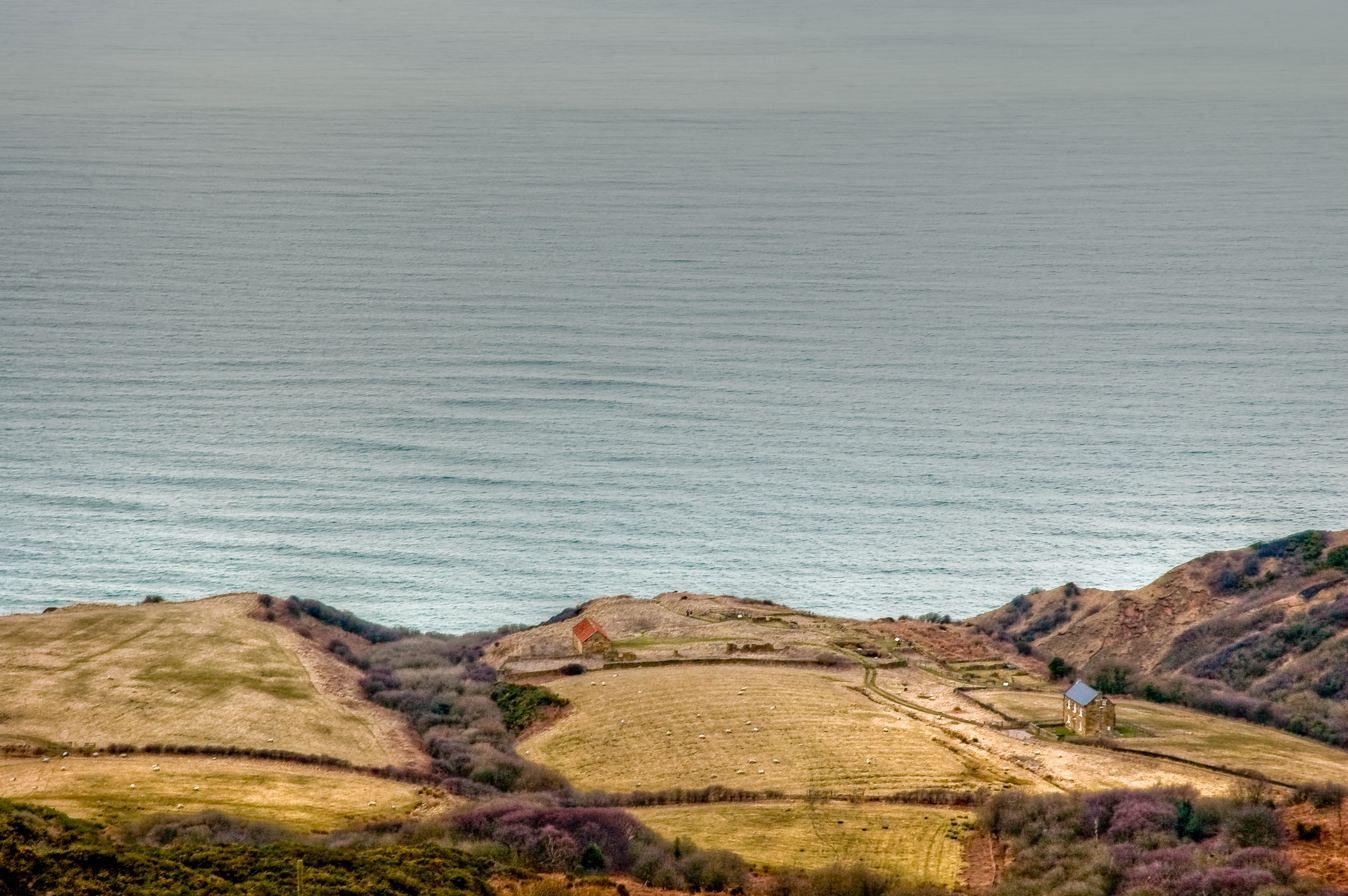
- Ravenscar from above

- Location within North Yorkshire
- OS grid reference: NZ980014
- Civil parish: Staintondale
- Unitary authority: North Yorkshire
- Ceremonial county: North Yorkshire
- Region: Yorkshire and the Humber
- Country: England
- Sovereign state: United Kingdom
- Post town: SCARBOROUGH
- Postcode district: YO13
- Police: North Yorkshire
- Fire: North Yorkshire
- Ambulance: Yorkshire
- UK Parliament: Scarborough and Whitby

Ravenscar is a coastal village in the county of North Yorkshire, England. It is within the civil parish of Staintondale and the North York Moors National Park, and is 10 miles (16 km) north of Scarborough. From 1974 to 2023 it was part of the Borough of Scarborough. It is now administered by the unitary North Yorkshire Council.

A National Trail, the 110-mile (180 km) Cleveland Way, passes through Ravenscar, as does the Cinder Track, a multi-use path that forms part of National Cycle Route 1. Ravenscar is also the eastern terminus of the challenging cross-moor Lyke Wake Walk, which ends where it meets the coast road. The sea around the area hosts a seal colony.

== History ==
Peak Alum Works

Ravenscar was the location of a late 4th century Roman signal station, part of a chain that extended along the Yorkshire coast.

Until the early 20th century, Ravenscar was known as 'Peak' or 'The Peak'. At the edge of the village is Beacon Windmill which dates from 1858.

To the north of the village is the old Peak alum works, now a National Trust site, but once an important part of the dyeing industry. The last alum works at Ravenscar closed down in 1871 after the invention of a synthetic dye fixer.

Bent Rigg radar station sits on a cliff top just to the south of the village.

At the turn of the 19th–20th century, plans were made to turn the village into a holiday resort to rival nearby Scarborough. Roads were laid out, some houses were built and sewers were laid. Because of the long trek to its rocky beach, Ravenscar never achieved popularity, and the development was left unfinished – a town with sewers and streets but no houses.

The village was served by Ravenscar railway station between 1885 and 1965.

=== Peak House/Raven Hall ===
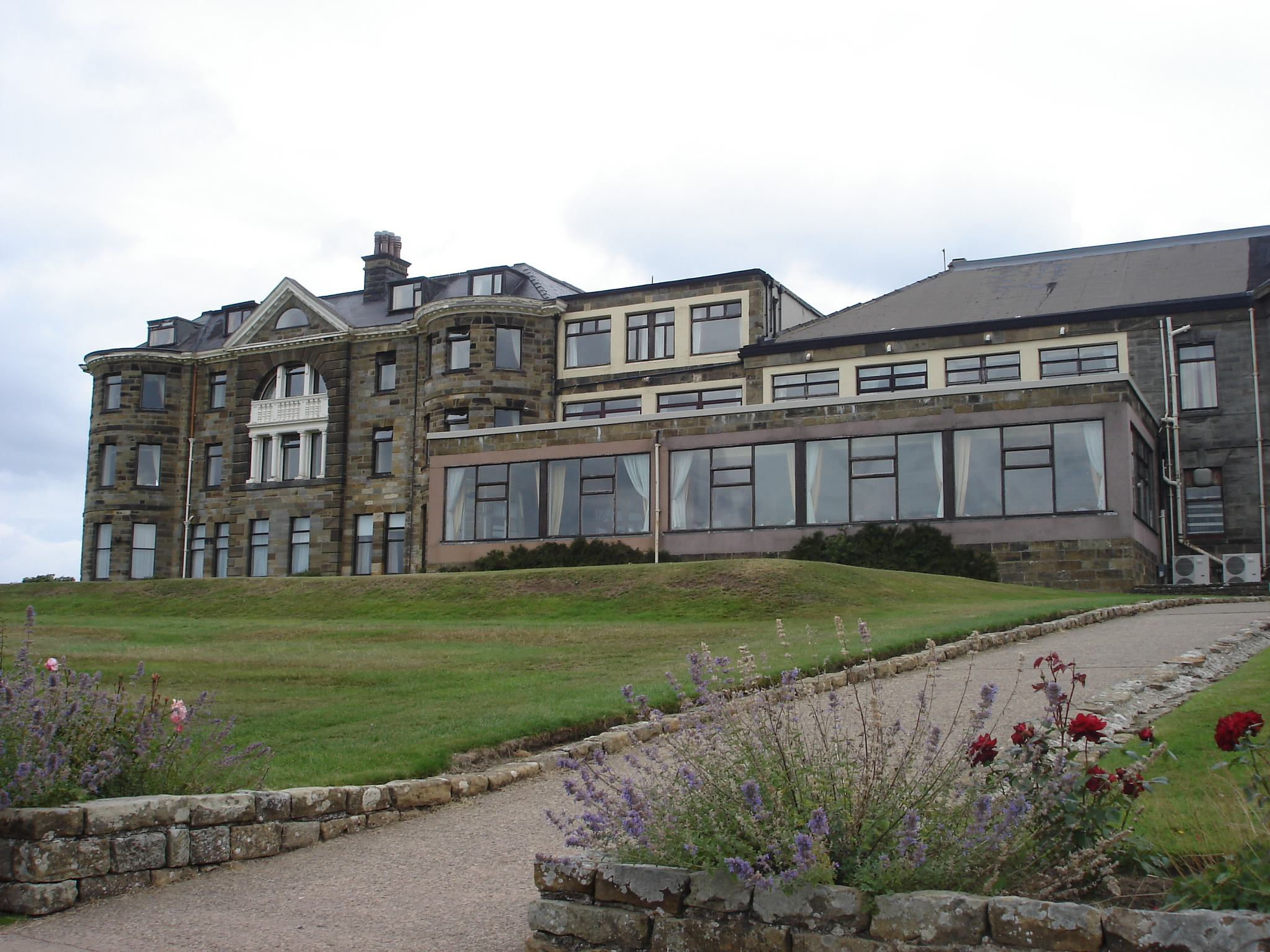
Raven Hall Hotel (previously Peak House)

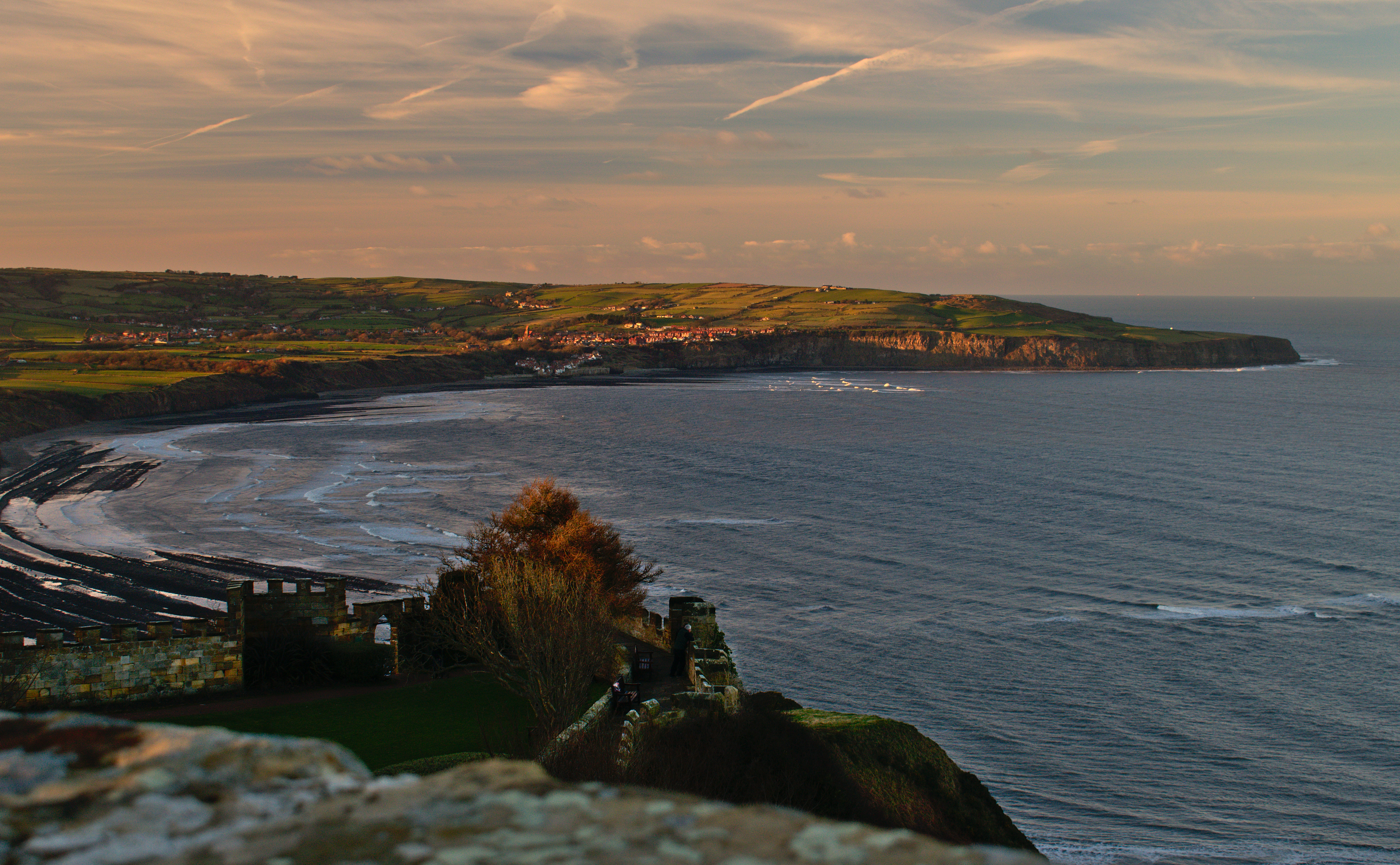
View of Ravenscar from the Raven Hall Hotel

In 1540, a farm known as Peak House owned by the Beswick family occupied the site of a 5th-century Roman fort. In 1774 Raven Hall was built on the site for Captain William Childs of London, a captain in the King's Regiment of Light Dragoons, who came to Yorkshire with the army and became the owner of the Alum Works at Ravenscar. On his death in 1829 the hall passed to his daughter Ann Willis, whose family (headed by Dr Francis Willis) had become wealthy from treating George III and other royalty for their medical conditions. Ann's son, the eccentric Rev Dr Richard Willis, built the gardens and battlements which surround the house. In 1845 the property passed into the hands of William Hammond of London.

Hammond became a prominent local benefactor, building the village church and the windmill. He became a director of the Scarborough to Whitby railway line, insisting that it passed through his property via a tunnel and that Ravenscar should have a station.

On his widow's death in 1890 the estate was sold to the Peak Estate Company for development as a holiday resort. The house was extended for use as a hotel from 1895, and its golf course opened in 1898. It was sold by auction in 1911 after the company went bankrupt, and after several changes of ownership and use as a billet in wartime it was acquired by the present owners, who are associated with Classic Hotels.

== Modern Ravenscar ==
St Hilda's Anglican Church in Ravenscar is part of the parish of St Mary's, Cloughton with Burniston. Ravenscar Chapel Cottage, part of the National Trust estate, is available as a rented holiday cottage.

== Popular culture ==
The name of the village is featured in a double episode (The Swords of Wayland) of the 1980s television show, Robin of Sherwood. The locations for Ravenscar, as featured in the episodes, were filmed in Cornwall and Somerset. The exterior of Ravenscar Castle was Saint Michael's Mount, and the interior, in particular the room where the seven swords were kept, was Wells Cathedral. Scenes for the German TV crime drama, The Search were filmed on location in Ravenscar in 2020.

The comic book anti-hero John Constantine was committed to the (fictional) Ravenscar Lunatic Asylum in the Hellblazer series of comics after a disastrous summoning. He returned there throughout the series.

In The Baroque Cycle, a series of novels by American writer Neal Stephenson, the fictional character Roger Comstock has the noble title "Marquess of Ravenscar".

== See also ==
- Listed buildings in Staintondale
