= Fyling Hall railway station =

Former railway station in the North Riding of Yorkshire, England

Fyling Hall
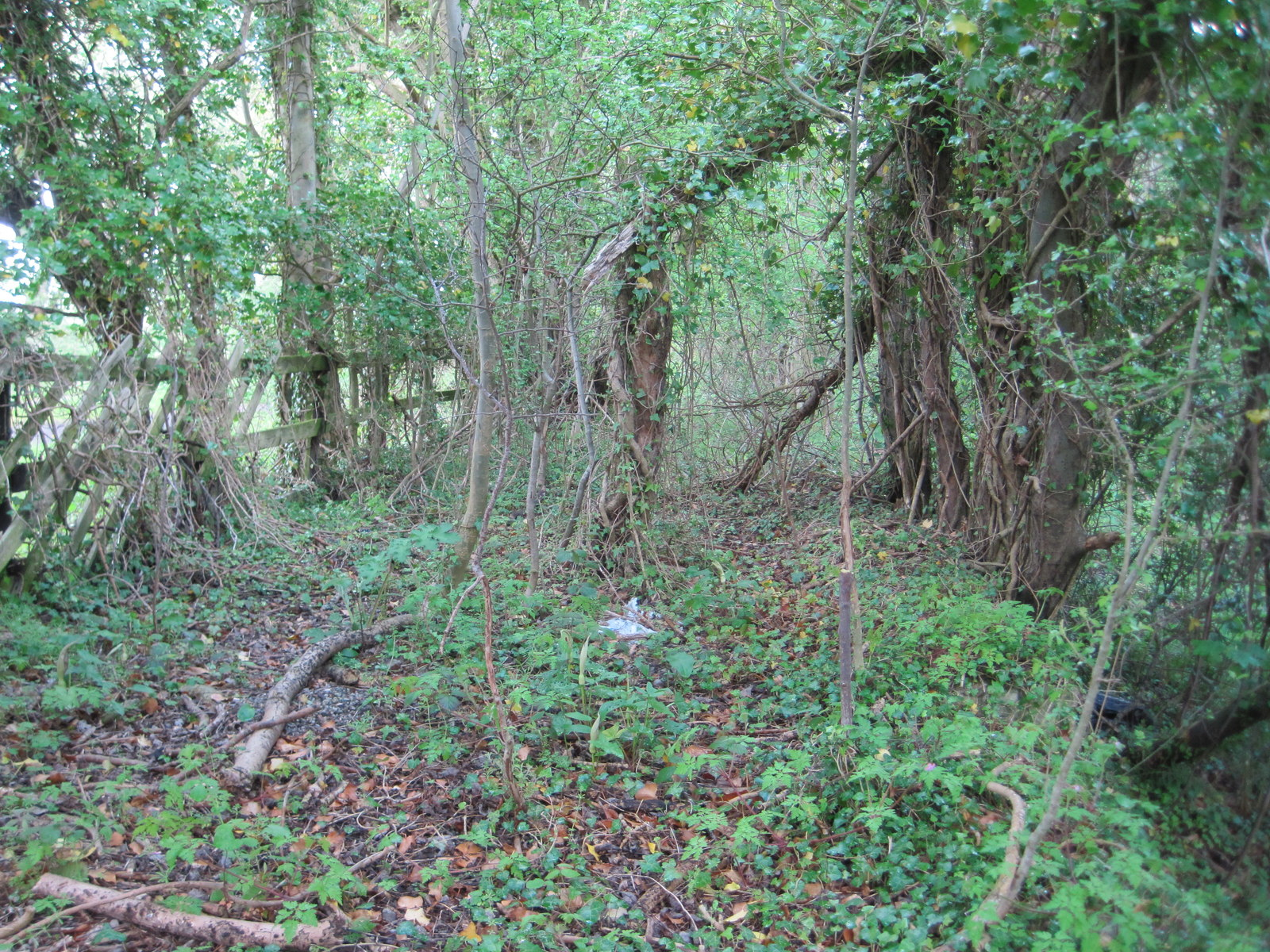
- Overgrown platform at former Fyling Hall station (2015)

General information
- Location: Fylingthorpe, North Yorkshire; England
- Coordinates: 54.412550°N 0.546332°W
- Grid reference: NZ944028
- Platforms: 1

Other information
- Status: Disused

History
- Original company: Scarborough and Whitby Railway
- Pre-grouping: North Eastern Railway
- Post-grouping: London and North Eastern Railway

Key dates
- 16 July 1885: Opened
- 1915: Closed (temporarily)
- 1920: Re-opened
- 1965: Closed completely
Location

Fyling Hall railway station was a railway station on the Scarborough & Whitby Railway. It opened on 16 July 1885, and was named after Fyling Hall, near Fylingthorpe. It was a small rural station with one platform, serving a catchment of less than 200 people.

== History ==
Fyling Hall station opened with the whole line from Scarborough to Whitby in July 1885, and was 13 miles 45 chains (21.8 km) north of Scarborough railway station, and 8 miles 8 chains (13 km) south of Whitby West Cliff railway station. The station had the one platform located on the western edge of the line, with the toilets, goods store, waiting room, booking office and signal cabin all located on the platform itself. A single-road goods yard was located behind the platform capable of handling livestock and general goods, although there was no permanent crane. The station was often mis-spelt as Flying Hall in tourist literature.

In 1911, the North Eastern Railway assessed the station as having a catchment of 200 people, with 5,700 tickets issued in the same surveyed year. It closed temporarily on 1 December 1915 as a wartime economy measure, before reopening on 18 September 1920. In 1934 it became a block post to allow two trains on the line between Ravenscar and Robins Hood Bay travelling at the same time in the same direction. In the same year, the construction of a passing loop was proposed as Fyling Hall was one of four stations on the line which did not possess one, but the proposal was rejected because the traffic levels that would justify it only occurred over short time periods. It became an unstaffed halt from 5 May 1958 with a siding remaining in use for public deliveries.

Freight services were discontinued on 4 May 1964, and the station finally closed on 8 March 1965. The remains of the platforms are now overgrown with vegetation, and the station has been converted to a dwelling. The site is open as part of the Cinder Track, a railway path between Scarborough and Whitby.

== Bibliography ==
- Butt, R. V. J. (October 1995). The Directory of Railway Stations: details every public and private passenger station, halt, platform and stopping place, past and present (1st ed.). Sparkford: Patrick Stephens Ltd. p. 100. ISBN 978-1-85260-508-7. OCLC 60251199. OL 11956311M.
- Lidster, J. Robin (2010). Scarborough and Whitby railway through time. Stroud: Amberley. ISBN 978-1-84868-668-7.

Preceding station	Disused railways	Following station
Ravenscar; Line and station closed	North Eastern Railway; Scarborough & Whitby Railway	Robin Hood's Bay; Line and station closed
