= Ravenscar railway station =

Former railway station in the North Riding of Yorkshire, England

Ravenscar
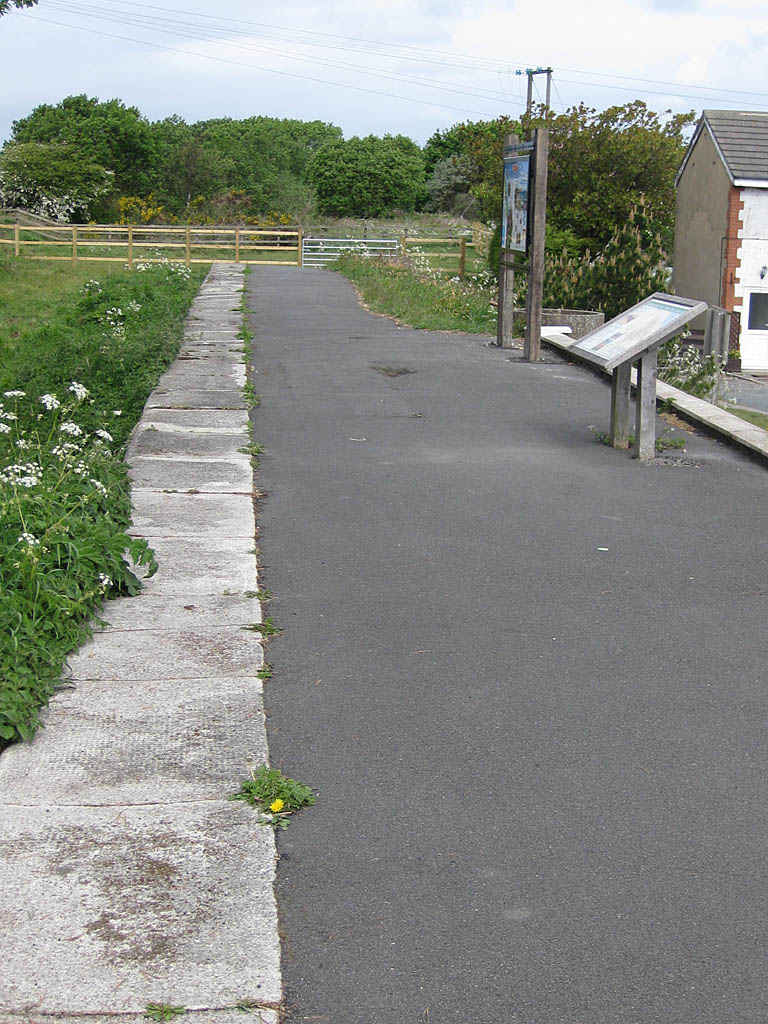
- The remaining platform of the former station at Ravenscar

General information
- Location: Ravenscar, North Yorkshire; England
- Coordinates: 54.397400°N 0.485050°W
- Grid reference: NZ984013
- Platforms: 2

Other information
- Status: Disused

History
- Original company: Scarborough and Whitby Railway
- Pre-grouping: North Eastern Railway
- Post-grouping: London and North Eastern Railway

Key dates
- 16 July 1885: Opened as Peak
- 6 March 1895: Closed
- 1 April 1896: Reopened
- 1 October 1897: Renamed Ravenscar
- 4 May 1964: Closed to freight
- 8 March 1965: Closed
Location

Ravenscar, originally known as Peak, was a railway station on the Scarborough & Whitby Railway and served the village of Ravenscar in the English county of North Yorkshire. It first opened in 1885 and finally closed in 1965 along with the rest of the line. The only remaining structure from the station is one of its platforms, but the Cinder Track, a multi-use trail that uses much of the rail line, passes by it.

== History ==
The station, located 10 miles 30 chains (16.7 km) north of Scarborough Central and 11 miles 22 chains (18.1 km) south of Whitby West Cliff, was opened on 16 July 1885 and was originally named Peak as it was situated at the highest point on the line at 631 feet (192 m) above sea level. It was renamed Ravenscar on 1 October 1897, after a company had been formed to market the area for investors in property. Up until that point, the area was known as Peak (or Old Peak), but the Scarborough & Whitby Railway Company agreed to change the name of the station to one taken from the name of the local hall (Raven Hall) and the Yorkshire suffix for a cliff, Scar. The planned building boom never materialised and just before the First World War, the company went bankrupt and the scheme was abandoned.

Ravenscar station was at the top of a steep climb from both north and south directions; the 1-in-39 climb south from Fyling Hall being 3 miles (4.8 km) long) while from the other direction there was a climb of over 2 miles (3.2 km) at a gradient of 1-in-41. There was also a 279-yard (255 m) tunnel immediately north of the station that curved sharply away to the west. The tunnel was problematic for drivers ascending from Fyling Hall as it was open to the sea and trains often stalled inside it.

When the Scarborough & Whitby Railway Company failed to have a station house built, as requested by the NER, the latter had the station closed on 2 March 1895, although some excursion trains still stopped there. After a station house was built, the station was reopened on 1 April 1896. Originally there was only a single platform and a siding, but a second platform was added in 1908. Ravenscar was the smallest equipped passing loop on the line, being able to pass trains consisting of 14 wagons, a brake van and the engine.

The 1956 Handbook of Stations listed Ravenscar as being able to handle general goods only, and there was no crane at the yard. The station was host to a LNER camping coach in 1935 and two coaches from 1936 to 1939. Two camping coaches were positioned here by the North Eastern Region from 1954 to 1964

Freight traffic ended on 4 May 1964 and the station closed completely on 8 March 1965. All buildings except the up platform have been removed since.

Preceding station	Disused railways	Following station
Staintondale; Line and station closed	North Eastern Railway; Scarborough & Whitby Railway	Fyling Hall; Line and station closed
