= Staintondale railway station =

Former railway station in the North Riding of Yorkshire, England

Staintondale
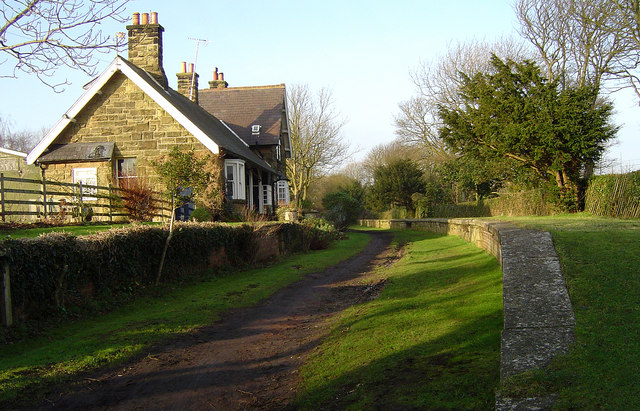
- The former station at Staintondale, 2006

General information
- Location: Staintondale, North Yorkshire; England
- Coordinates: 54.366300°N 0.463050°W
- Grid reference: SE999979
- Platforms: 2

Other information
- Status: Disused

History
- Original company: Scarborough & Whitby Railway
- Pre-grouping: North Eastern Railway
- Post-grouping: London and North Eastern Railway

Key dates
- 16 July 1885: Opened
- 1964: Closed to goods traffic
- 8 March 1965: Closed
Location

Staintondale railway station was 8 miles (13 km) north of Scarborough and served the hamlet of Staintondale in North Yorkshire, England. It opened on 16 July 1885 when the Scarborough & Whitby Railway opened the full line. In 1937 the station was renamed as Stainton Dale (written as two separate words). (Note: The 1893 Ordnance Survey map has the village written as "Staintondale" and the station as "Stainton Dale")

The station had two platforms either side of a passing loop and a small goods yard to the west. It was listed in 1904 as being able to handle general goods, livestock, horse boxes and prize cattle vans. There was no permanent crane, although one is shown on the 1893 Ordnance Survey map. A camping coach was positioned here by the North Eastern Region from 1954 to 1958 and two coaches were here from 1959 to 1964.

On 4 May 1964 the goods service was withdrawn from the station, which closed completely on 8 March 1965. During the station's final year of operation its average weekly taking was £15 but the wages bill for the station came to £180.

The platforms and the main station buildings (used for residential purposes) are still in place. The railway alignment through the station is used by the Cinder Track, a multi-use path between Scarborough and Whitby.

== Bibliography ==
- Butt, R.V.J. (1995). The Directory of Railway Stations. Patrick Stephens Limited. ISBN 1-85260-508-1.
- Chapman, Stephen (2008). York to Scarborough Whitby & Ryedale. Bellcode Books. ISBN 978-1-871233-19-3.

Preceding station	Disused railways	Following station
Hayburn Wyke; Line and station closed	North Eastern Railway; Scarborough & Whitby Railway	Ravenscar; Line and station closed
