= Cinder Track =

Multi-use path between Whitby and Scarborough in North Yorkshire, England

The Cinder Track
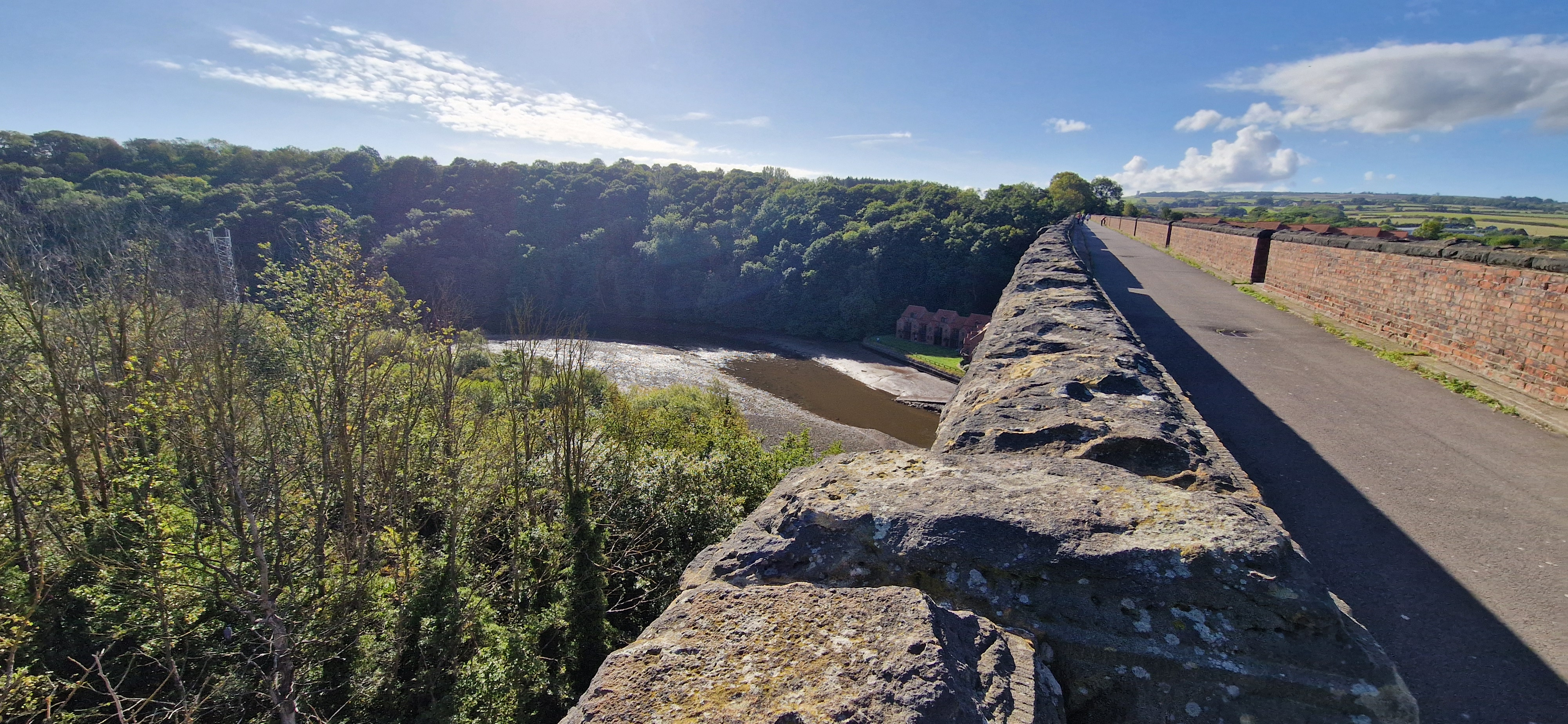
- The Cinder Track on the Larpool Viaduct across the River Esk in Whitby, looking towards Scarborough
- Length: 21.7 mi (34.9 km)
- Location: North Yorkshire, England
- Trailheads: Scarborough and Whitby
- Use: Cycling, Horse riding, Walking
- Highest point: 631 feet (192 m)
- Right of way: Scarborough and Whitby Railway

The Cinder Track, also known as the Scarborough to Whitby Rail Trail or the Scarborough to Whitby Cinder Track, is a 21.7-mile (34.9 km) multi-use rail trail that runs from Scarborough to Whitby, in the English county of North Yorkshire. The route follows the former trackbed of the Scarborough and Whitby Railway and is used by walkers, cyclists and horse riders. It forms part of National Cycle Route 1, which runs along much of the east coast of Great Britain. South of Whitby, the trail crosses the 120-foot (37 m) high Larpool Viaduct.

== History ==
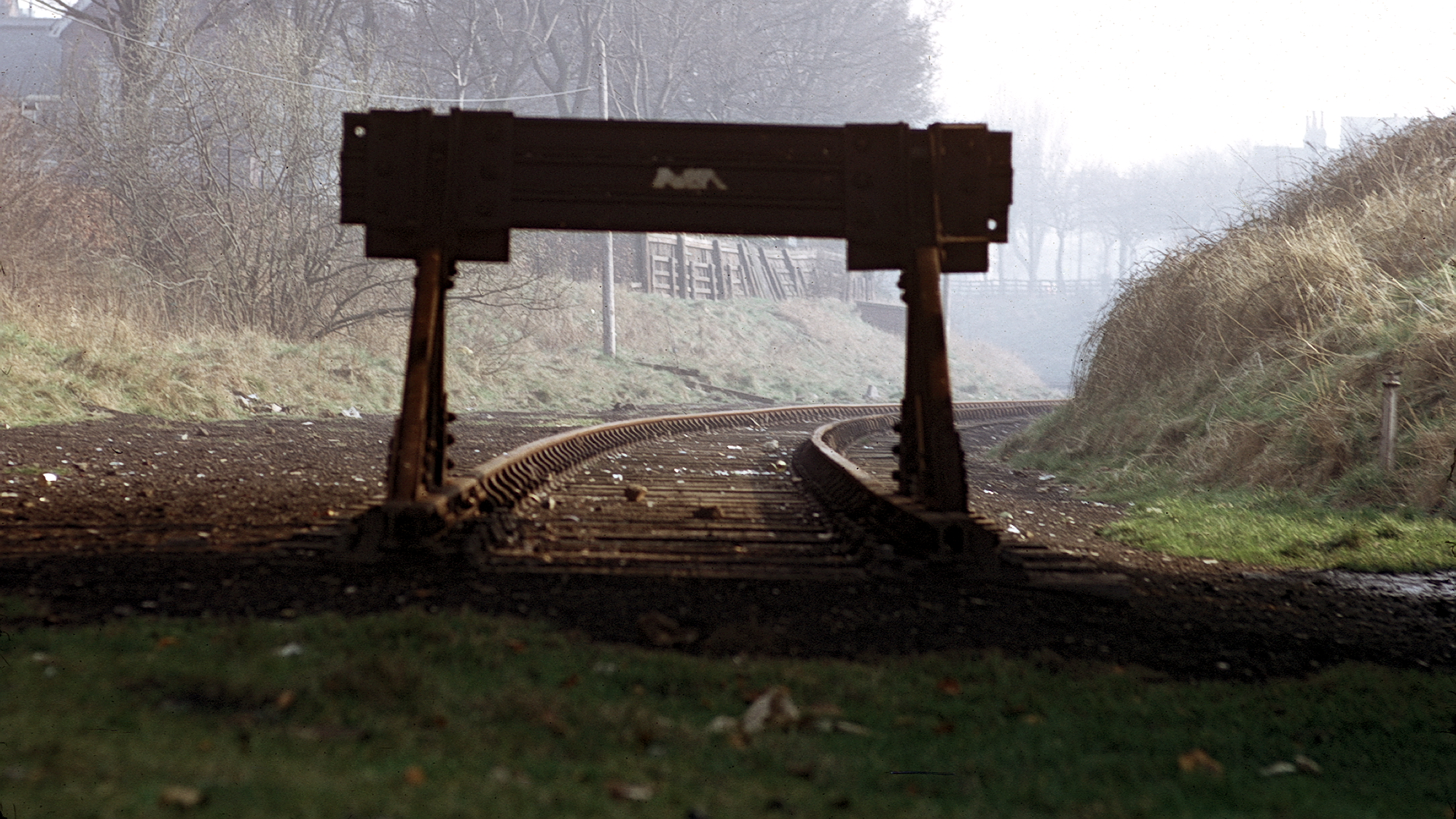
The end of the line - buffers under Woodland Ravine railway bridge in 1972

The Scarborough and Whitby Railway was constructed between 1872 and 1885, and opened to traffic on 16 July 1885. It was initially operated by the North Eastern Railway, passing to the London and North Eastern Railway in the railway grouping of 1923, and subsequently to British Railways following nationalisation in 1948. The route was listed for closure in the 1963 Beeching Report. Despite a public campaign opposing the proposal, the line closed to all traffic on 8 March 1965. Most of the track was lifted in 1968; however, speculation over the development of a potash mine near Hawsker resulted in the section between Hawsker and Whitby remaining in situ until 1972.

Shortly after closure, Scarborough Borough Council purchased the former railway line between 1975 and 1976; they sold off most of the buildings, but converted the trackbed into a pathway.

In 2018 plans to spend £3.5 million to repair and improve the Cinder Track were backed by Scarborough Borough Council. The plans would see the route resurfaced, drainage improved and the creation of a new management body to oversee the development of the track. There is also the possibility of introducing a visitor centre, cafe and pay and display parking to generate ongoing funding to maintain the route. Work upgrading the track began in January 2020 and the first stage is now complete. Local improvements continue to be funded as part of the Town Deal offered by the UK government.

== Route ==
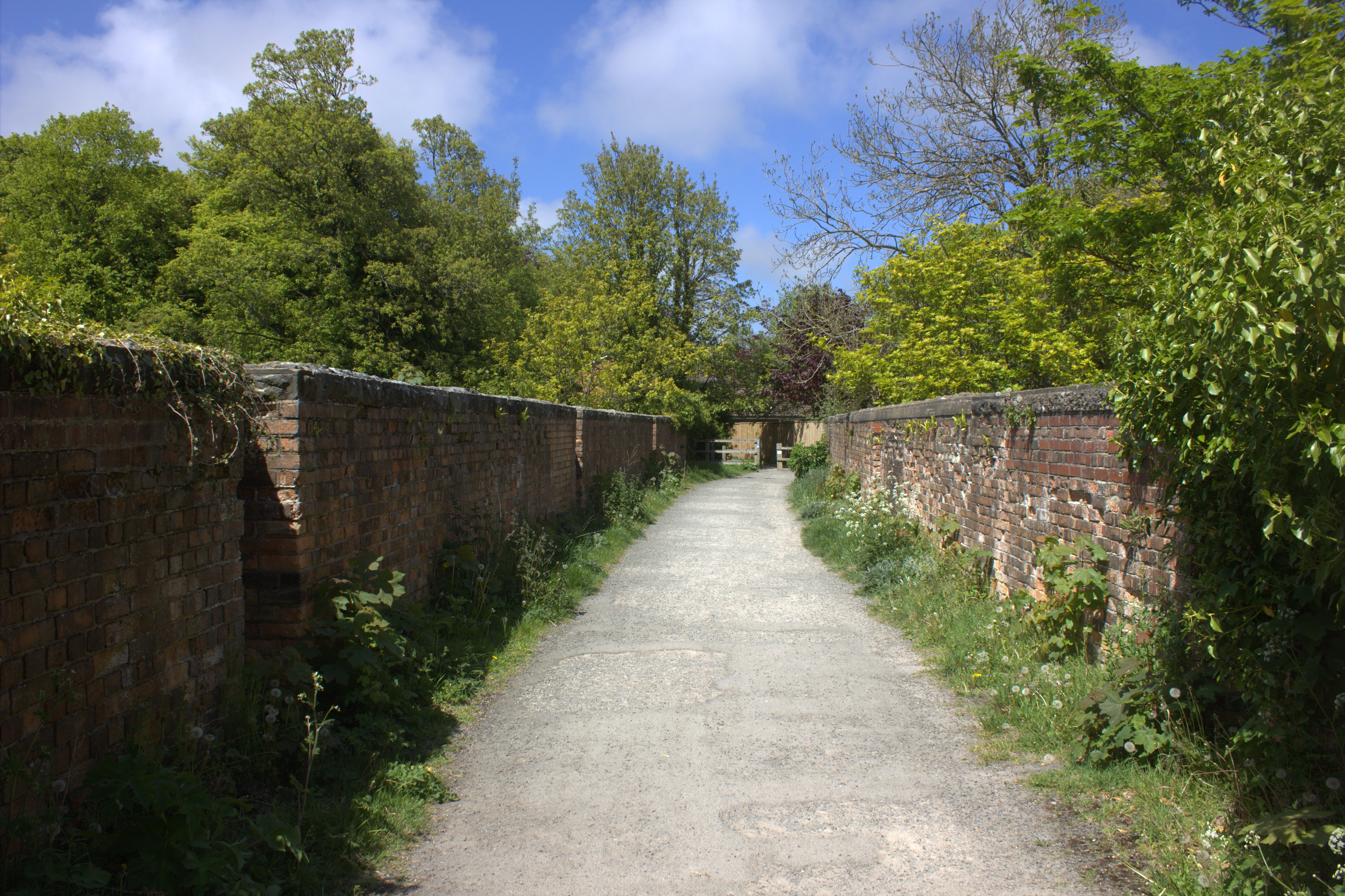
Crossing the Scalby Beck Viaduct

The route may be walked or cycled in either direction between the trailheads at Scarborough and Whitby; however, this description assumes a start at Scarborough.

The trail begins at the car park of Sainsbury’s supermarket, on the site of the former Gallows Close goods yard, approximately 0.5 miles (0.80 km) from Scarborough station. The railway south of this point originally ran through a tunnel that has since been infilled. From the start point, the route runs north beneath several road bridges and alongside playing fields occupying the site of former sidings. It crosses Scalby Beck on a viaduct and passes the site of Scalby station, before diverting briefly onto minor suburban streets to bypass a section of the former railway alignment that has been built over. The trail then re-joins the original route and continues through open countryside, passing the villages of Burniston and Cloughton.

Passing the Ravenscar Visitors Centre, with a view over Robin Hood's Bay behind

Shortly after the site of Cloughton station, the trail enters the North York Moors National Park, remaining within it until shortly before reaching Whitby. Between this point and Robin Hood’s Bay there are extensive coastal views, as well as views of walkers on the Cleveland Way, which runs along the nearby cliff tops. The route passes the remains of Hayburn Wyke station, together with the hotel, beach and twin waterfalls it once served, and then continues past the site of Staintondale station before reaching the site of Ravenscar station. Beyond the station, the original railway entered Ravenscar Tunnel; as a result, the trail follows local roads through Ravenscar village and past the visitor centre, rejoining the former railway alignment on the far side of the tunnel.

Beyond Ravenscar, the route descends through a former alum quarry and brickworks, then continues across long embankments and heather-covered hillsides with wide-ranging coastal views. It passes the sites of Fyling Hall station and Robin Hood's Bay station, the latter located at the top of the Robin Hood's Bay village’s steep main street. After a short diversion onto local streets where the railway alignment has been built over, the trail returns to the former trackbed and follows the coastline closely around Bay Ness. After rounding the promontory, the route gradually turns inland, crossing the A171 road and reaching Hawsker station. The station buildings and platforms survive, with the buildings now used as a cycle hire centre and the platforms occupied by restored railway carriages used for accommodation.

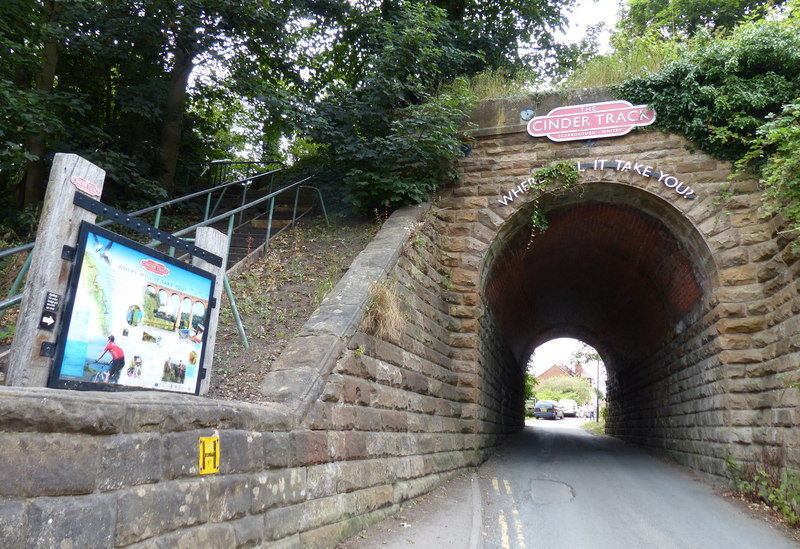
The Whitby end of the trail, accessible either up the steps to the left, or by a ramp from the other side of the road underbridge

Leaving Hawsker, the trail continues inland, descending through farmland and woodland past the village of Stainsacre to Larpool Viaduct, which crosses both the tidal River Esk and the Esk Valley Railway. This viaduct is the most significant structure on the route, comprising 13 brick-built spans and measuring 305 yards (279 m) in length and 120 feet (37 m) in height. The crossing offers extensive views westward over the North York Moors and eastward towards the river, harbour and Whitby Abbey. After crossing the viaduct, the trail curves eastwards towards Whitby, joining the overgrown trackbed of the former steeply graded link line between the Esk Valley Railway and the Scarborough and Whitby Railway. The trail terminates before the site of Whitby West Cliff station, where a ramp and staircase descend to street level. Whitby town centre lies approximately 0.3 miles (0.48 km) to the east.

== Related and connecting trails ==
The Cinder Track (left) and Cleveland Way (right) diverge just north of Ravenscar

The Cinder Track forms part of National Cycle Route 1, a route of the National Cycle Network that follows the east coast of Great Britain from Dover to Tain, passing through London and Edinburgh.

For its entire length, the Cinder Track broadly parallels the coastal section of the Cleveland Way long-distance footpath. Owing to its origins as a railway line, the trail follows a generally flatter and more inland alignment than the Cleveland Way, providing an alternative option for walkers seeking a less demanding route. The two trails connect at Scarborough, Hayburn Wyke, Ravenscar, Robin Hood's Bay and Whitby, thus providing walkers with the opportunity to use parts of both trails as a circular walk. At Scalby, the Cinder Trail interseects the Tabular Hills Walk, which connects Helmsley, at the western (inland) end of the Cleveland Way, to the coastal section of the Cleveland Way just north of Scarborough.

The Cinder Track also connects with various other long-distance footpaths:

- The Esk Valley Walk, from Castleton to Whitby
- The Coast to Coast Walk, from St Bees, on the Irish Sea coast, to Robins Hood Bay
- The Lyke Wake Walk, across the heart of the North York Moors from Osmotherley to Ravenscar
- The White Rose Way, from Leeds to Scarborough.
