= Robin Hood's Bay railway station =

Former railway station in the North Riding of Yorkshire, England

Robin Hood's Bay
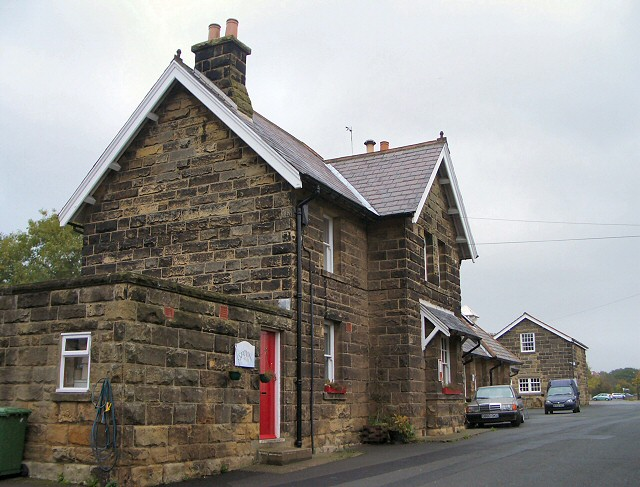
- The former station buildings at Robin Hood's Bay (2005)

General information
- Location: Robin Hood's Bay, North Yorkshire; England
- Coordinates: 54.435200°N 0.539000°W
- Grid reference: NZ949054
- Platforms: 2

Other information
- Status: Disused

History
- Original company: Scarborough & Whitby Railway
- Pre-grouping: North Eastern Railway
- Post-grouping: London and North Eastern Railway

Key dates
- 16 July 1885: Opened
- 8 March 1965: Closed
Location

Robin Hood's Bay railway station was a railway station on the Scarborough & Whitby Railway situated 15 miles (24 km) from Scarborough and 6 miles (9.7 km) from Whitby. It served the fishing village of Robin Hood's Bay, and to a lesser extent the village of Fylingthorpe. The station initially opened in 1885, and finally closed in 1965, along with the rest of the line. The station buildings survive, along with the station master's house, and are used for holiday accommodation, whilst the station yard is used as a car park. The Cinder Track multi-user path from Scarborough to Whitby passes through the site.

== History ==
The railway between Scarborough and Whitby opened in July 1885, with most stations on the line, including Robin Hood's Bay, opening on the 16th of the month. Robin Hood's Bay had two platforms which worked as a passing loop, with the station buildings, mostly made of stone, on the south side (Scarborough bound direction) of the station. The signal box was also located on the Scarborough-bound direction (the Up line).

The goods yard had a 1.5 tonnes (1.7 tons) crane and could handle all kinds of freight. With five sidings, cattle dock, coal yard, goods shed, and weighbridge, it was the largest intermediate station on the line.

Incoming freight largely consisted of coal, with Robin Hood's Bay being the second busiest on the line with that commodity after Cloughton station. Outward freight consisted of seafood and gravel; 151 tonnes (166 tons) was recorded as having left the station in 1913. The station sent crabs to London and winkles to King's Lynn.

By 1928, when the LNER were in charge, the station had a platelayers trolley fitted with life-saving apparatus in case of an accident at sea near the coast. The trolley would be sent out with at least one member of station staff onto the headland north of the station in an attempt to help stricken shipping. The station was host to a LNER camping coach in 1935, possibly one for some of 1934 and three coaches from 1936 to 1939. Three coaches were positioned here by North Eastern Region of British Railways from 1954 and five from 1957 to 1964. After closure of the Whitby to Loftus route, most camping coaches were located on the Scarborough to Whitby line, with the greater number at Robin Hood's Bay possibly being due to the availability of electricity.

Freight services were officially withdrawn on 10 August 1964, however, the last freight train to Robin Hood's Bay ran on 16 August 1964, as some of the final freight to be forwarded to the station arrived late at Scarborough Gallows Close. The last passenger service was on 6 March 1965, but there was no service at that time of year on Sundays, so the station closed on 8 March.

The station building survives, it and the former stationmaster's house are used as holiday accommodation. Only a small part of the down platform remains. The former trackbed forms part of the Scarborough to Whitby Railway Path (The Cinder Track). The goods shed was adapted into a village hall, the new-build northern part of which straddles the trackbed.

== Services ==
The station was 15 miles 22 chains (24.6 km) north of Scarborough Central railway station, and 6 miles 53 chains (10.7 km) south of Whitby West Cliff. On the north-bound journey trains had to climb a mile and a half at 1-in-43 out of the station. Some services reversed at West Cliff and descended the branch into Whitby Town, which was a further 1 mile 63 chains (2.9 km).

Between 1902 and 1922 when the North Eastern Railway were running the trains, an average of five services ran each way, along the whole length of the line calling at all stations between Scarborough and Whitby Town, with a reversal at Whitby West Cliff. By the spring timetable of 1939, the basic pattern was still five trains per day, with an extra seven by the end of June for the start of the summer season. In 1946, the services were down to four a day, with an extra four during the summer season. Robin Hood's Bay was the only station on the line that enjoyed the provision of all services calling there. The other stations on the line, barring the two end stations, were served sporadically.

In the summer of 1962, nine services ran the length of the line, but the winter season amounted to three trips each way. DMUs had been introduced in 1958, which sped up the reversals at Whitby and Scarborough.

== Incidents ==
As the Up line left the station westwards, the points led to the main running line and a short siding which ran over the road between Fylingthorpe and Robin Hood's Bay, before ending in a siding. This siding was the scene of two accidents;

- July 1939 – a Scarborough-bound train departed the station against the signals and derailed on the siding.
- October 1961 – a ballast train descending the 1-in-43 bank from Hawsker ran out of control, and the signaller diverted the train onto the siding, which resulted in the buffer-stop being pushed 40 yards (37 m) from the end of the line.

== Bibliography ==
- Bairstow, Martin (2008). Railways around Whitby : Scarborough – Whitby – Saltburn, Malton – Goathland – Whitby, Esk Valley, Forge Valley and Gilling lines. Leeds: Martin Bairstow. ISBN 978-1-871944-34-1.
- Butt, R.V.J. (1995). The Directory Of Railway Stations. Patrick Stephens Limited. ISBN 1-85260-508-1.
- Chapman, Stephen (2008). York to Scarborough, Whitby & Ryedale. Todmorden: Bellcode Books. ISBN 9781871233193.
- Hoole, K. (1983). Railways of the North York Moors : a pictorial history. Clapham: Dalesman Books. ISBN 0-85206-731-3.
- Hoole, Ken (1985). Railway stations of the North East. Newton Abbot: David & Charles. ISBN 0-7153-8527-5.
- Lidster, J. Robin (2010). Scarborough and Whitby railway through time. Stroud: Amberley. ISBN 978-1-84868-668-7.

| Preceding station | Disused railways | Following station |
|---|---|---|
| Fyling Hall; Line and station closed | North Eastern Railway; Scarborough & Whitby Railway | Hawsker; Line and station closed |
