= Hawsker railway station =

Former railway station in the North Riding of Yorkshire, England

Hawsker
- The former platform at Hawsker with some old railway carriages (2007)

General information
- Location: Hawsker, North Yorkshire; England
- Coordinates: 54.459350°N 0.578500°W
- Grid reference: NZ922080
- Platforms: 1

Other information
- Status: Disused

History
- Original company: Scarborough and Whitby Railway
- Pre-grouping: North Eastern Railway
- Post-grouping: London and North Eastern Railway

Key dates
- 1885: Opened
- 1965: Closed
Location

Hawsker was a railway station on the Scarborough & Whitby Railway. It opened on 16 July 1885, and served the villages of High Hawsker, Low Hawsker and Stainsacre. Hawsker was a small intermediate stop and its ticket sales reflected this; it sold only 8,982 tickets in 1922. The Scarborough & Whitby railway was a victim of the Beeching cuts and all freight traffic to Hawsker was curtailed by 10 August 1964 and the station closed to passengers on 8 March 1965.

The track from Whitby was left in situ until 1973 pending potash traffic which never materialised. The trackbed is now used by the Cinder Track, used by walker, cyclists and horse-riders between Whitby and Scarborough. The road overbridge immediately south of the station was removed in the 1990s and replaced with a dual pelican crossing. The station is now (2007) the headquarters of Trailways Cycle Hire and has old railway carriages used as accommodation on site. In the 2010s a brick wing (in a style similar to the rest of the building) was added to the station house's southeast side.

== Bibliography ==
- Butt, R.V.J. (1995). The Directory Of Railway Stations. Patrick Stephens Limited. ISBN 1-85260-508-1.
- Chapman, Stephen (2008). York to Scarborough Whitby & Ryedale. Bellcode Books. ISBN 978-1-871233-19-3.

Preceding station	Disused railways	Following station
Robin Hood's Bay; Line and station closed	North Eastern Railway; Scarborough & Whitby Railway	Whitby West Cliff; Line and station closed
