= Listed buildings in Cloughton =

Cloughton is a civil parish in the county of North Yorkshire, England. It contains 13 listed buildings that are recorded in the National Heritage List for England. All the listed buildings are designated at Grade II, the lowest of the three grades, which is applied to "buildings of national importance and special interest". The parish contains the village of Cloughton and the surrounding countryside. Apart from two farmhouses and associated farm buildings, all the listed buildings are in the village, and consist of houses, cottages and associated structures, a public house, a church and a war memorial.

== Buildings ==
Name and location	Photograph	Date	Notes
Providence Health Farmhouse and cowsheds 54.36699°N 0.49475°W	—	17th century (probable)	The oldest parts are the cowsheds, with the farmhouse added in the mid-18th century. The buildings are in sandstone, and have pantile roofs with gable coping and plain kneelers. The house has two bays, one storey and an attic, and an outshut, and the cowsheds to the left have three bays. In the centre of the house is a doorway, flanked by horizontally-sliding sash windows, and there is a fire window.
Dovecote, Cloughton Hall; 54.33333°N 0.45030°W	—	17th century (probable)	The dovecote is in stone, it is circular with two tiers, and has a domed stone roof surmounted by a low gable with dove holes. It contains a doorway in a timber frame.
Blacksmith's Arms Inn; 54.33443°N 0.44982°W		Late 17th century	The public house, which has been extended, is in sandstone, and has a tile roof. Most of the windows have three lights and chamfered mullions, those in the ground floor with hood moulds, and there is also a fire window. The doorway is in a later extension.
Manor House; 54.33648°N 0.44865°W	—	1733	The house, later divided into two, is in sandstone, with chamfered quoins, a moulded eaves cornice and a pantile roof with stone coping and moulded kneelers. There are two storeys, five bays and a rear extension. On the front are two doorways with fanlights, and between them is a canted bay window. The left house has sash windows, and in the right house are swivel windows in architraves. Between the houses is a datestone in an architrave, and there is a corresponding tablet below.
46 High Street; 54.33608°N 0.44867°W	—	Late 18th century	The house is in sandstone, and has a pantile roof with coped gables and moulded kneelers. There are two storeys and three bays. The windows are sashes, those flanking the doorway are horizontally-sliding. The ground floor openings have stone lintels, the windows flanking the doorway also have keystones.
Sycarham House Farmhouse; 54.34549°N 0.43662°W	—	Late 18th century	The farmhouse is in grey sandstone with dressings in lighter sandstone, and a pantile roof with coped gables and moulded kneelers. There are two storeys and three bays, and a rear staircase outshut. The doorway has a porch with a pantile canopy, and the windows are a mix of casements and sashes, all with sandstone voussoirs.
Church Cottages; 54.33414°N 0.45007°W	—	Early 19th century	A pair of sandstone cottages with a pantile roof, coped gables and moulded kneelers. There are two storeys and two bays. In the centre are paired doorways, and the windows are sashes; one window at the rear is horizontally-sliding. All the openings have plain lintels.
Cloughton Hall; 54.33370°N 0.45001°W		Early 19th century	The house is in sandstone, and has a double-span roof with stone coping, moulded kneelers and a finial. There are two storeys, a double-depth plan, three bays, and a later gabled cross-wing with an attic on the left. On the front is a flat-roofed porch and a doorway with a fanlight, and three canted bay windows. The windows are sashes, the attic window being tripartite.
Rose Dene; 54.33536°N 0.44958°W	—	Early 19th century	A sandstone house that has a pantile roof with stone coping and moulded kneelers. There are two storeys, three bays, and a later rear extension. The windows are sashes with wedge lintels and channelled keystones, and the entrance is in the rear extension.
Uttriss House; 54.33456°N 0.45015°W	—	Early 19th century	The house is in sandstone with a pantile roof, stone coping and moulded kneelers. There are two storeys and three bays. The central doorway has a rectangular fanlight, the windows are sashes, and all the openings have lintels with keystones.
25 High Street; 54.33673°N 0.44854°W	—	Early to mid 19th century	The house is in sandstone, and has a pantile roof with coped gables and plain kneelers. There are two storeys and two bays. Steps lead to the central doorway, the windows are sashes, and the ground floor openings have stone lintels.
St Mary's Church; 54.33388°N 0.45005°W		1831	The church, which was restored and extended in 1889–90, is in sandstone on a chamfered plinth, and has a slate roof. It consists of a nave and a chancel under a continuous roof, a north chapel and organ chamber, and a south vestry. On the west gable is a three-light bellcote with Tudor arched corbelled hood moulds. There are Tudor arched doorways in the north and west walls, and the east window has five lights with Perpendicular tracery.
War memorial 54.33800°N 0.45016°W	—	c. 1920	The war memorial is in sandstone, and consists of an obelisk on a square plinth on three steps. On the north face of the obelisk is a laurel wreath carved in low relief. On the north face of the plinth is an inscription, and the names of those lost in the two World Wars are on three of the faces.
