= Beacon Windmill =

Windmill in North Yorkshire, England

Coordinates: 54.3916°N 0.4979°W

The building, in 2024

Beacon Windmill is a historic building in Ravenscar, North Yorkshire, a village in England.

The windmill was built in 1858, for local landlord William Hammond. It was originally known as Peak Mill, was leased out jointly with a neighbouring pub, and was used to grind corn. The pub was later converted into a farmhouse. By 1902, the mill was in poor condition, and the two remaining sails blew down in high winds. The mill then closed, and the machinery was sold. The mill was left derelict for many years, and was still disused when it was featured in two episodes of the television series Heartbeat. In 2013, it was converted into a holiday let. The building has been grade II listed since 2001.

The building is constructed of stone with a plain stone eaves band. It has a circular plan and three storeys. On the ground floor is a doorway, and each of the upper two storeys has a single opening.

== See also ==
- Listed buildings in Staintondale
