= Listed buildings in Staintondale =

Staintondale is a civil parish in the county of North Yorkshire, England. It contains six listed buildings that are recorded in the National Heritage List for England. All the listed buildings are designated at Grade II, the lowest of the three grades, which is applied to "buildings of national importance and special interest". The parish contains the villages of Staintondale and Ravenscar and the surrounding countryside. The listed buildings consist of houses, farmhouses and a disused windmill.

== Buildings ==
Name and location	Photograph	Date	Notes
Bees Nest Farmhouse; 54.37284°N 0.47372°W	—	Late 17th century (probable)	The farmhouse is cob faced with sandstone, and has a pantile roof with coped gables and moulded kneelers. There is one storey and an attic, and two bays. Steps lead up to the doorway, and the windows are horizontally sliding sashes.
Cragg Hall Farm; 54.39862°N 0.49702°W	—	Late 17th century (probable)	The farmhouse is in sandstone, and has a pantile roof with stone flagged coping on the left gable, and is in two parts. The main part has one storey and an attic, a washhouse at the west end, and two bays. It contains a doorway, a fire window and horizontally sliding sashes. The lower part to the east has a single storey, and a byre at the end with a stable door.
Danesdale Farmhouse; 54.38700°N 0.48420°W	—	Early 18th century (probable)	The farmhouse is in sandstone, and has a pantile roof with coped gables and kneelers. There are two bays, the left with one storey and an attic, the right taller with two storeys, and at the rear are two outshuts. The doorway is in the right bay, the windows are sashes, some horizontally sliding, and the openings in the right bay have keystones.
Bent Rigg Farm Cottage; 54.39387°N 0.48506°W	—	Late 18th century	A pair of cottages combined into one house, it is in sandstone, and has a pantile roof with coped gables. There are two storeys and two bays, and a rear outshut. On the front are double doors, one blocked, and sash windows, all but one horizontally sliding.
Beacon Windmill; 54.39160°N 0.49788°W		c.1800	The disused tower windmill is in stone with a plain stone eaves band. There is a circular plan and three storeys. On the ground floor is a doorway, and each of the upper two storeys has a single opening without windows.
Glenville; 54.37277°N 0.47698°W		Early 19th century	The house is in grey sandstone, and has a slate roof with coped gables and moulded kneelers. There are two storeys and two bays. The central doorway has a rectangular fanlight, the windows are sashes, and all the openings have wedge lintels. At the rear is a round-headed stair window with a moulded surround and a keystone.
