= Blacksmiths Arms, Cloughton =

Listed pub in North Yorkshire, England

Blacksmiths Arms
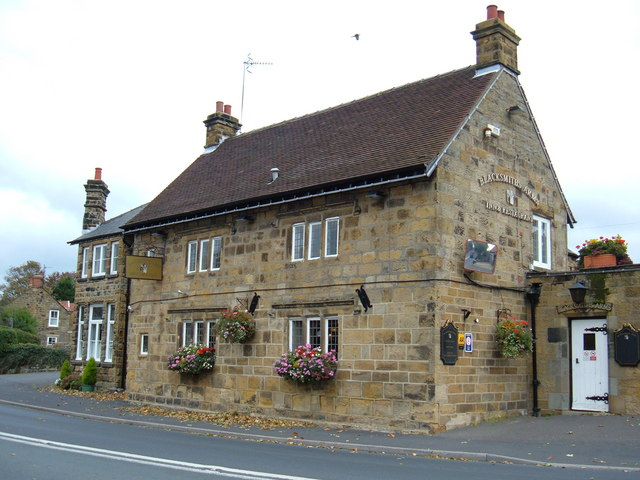
- The pub in 2009
- Interactive map of the Blacksmiths Arms area
- Alternative names: Blacksmith's Arms Inn

General information
- Type: Public house
- Location: High Street, Cloughton, North Yorkshire, England
- Coordinates: 54.3344°N 0.4498°W
- Year built: Late 17th century
- Renovated: 19th and 20th century (extended)

Design and construction
- Designations

Listed Building – Grade II
- Official name: Blacksmith's Arms Inn
- Designated: 18 January 1967
- Reference no.: 1258002

Website
- blacksmithsarmsinn.co.uk

The Blacksmiths Arms is a historic pub on High Street in Cloughton, a village in North Yorkshire, England.

The building was constructed in the late 17th century, and is said to have served as a pub from the mid-18th century. It was extended in the 19th and 20th centuries to the sides and rear. In 2010, Elizabeth II of the United Kingdom and Prince Philip, Duke of Edinburgh ate at the pub, while visiting the area.

The pub is built of sandstone, and has a tiled roof. Most of the windows have three lights and chamfered mullions, those in the ground floor with hood moulds, and there is also a fire window. The doorway is in a later extension. The building was Grade II listed in 1967.

== See also ==
- Listed buildings in Cloughton
