= St Mary's Church, Cloughton =

Church in Cloughton, North Yorkshire, England

Coordinates: 54.3339°N 0.4500°W

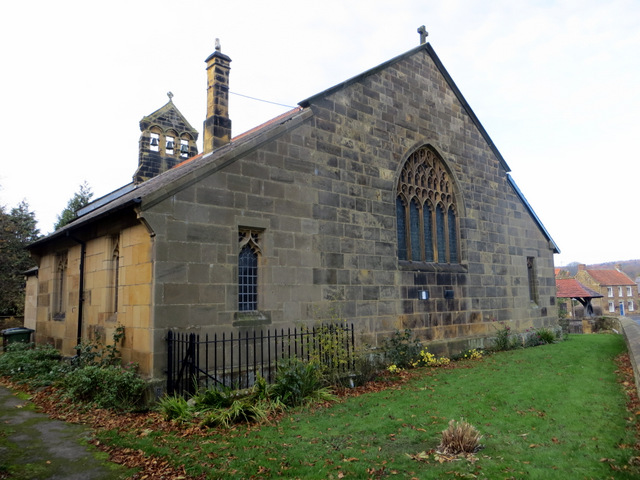
The church, in 2013

St Mary's Church is the parish church of Cloughton, a village in North Yorkshire, in England.

There was a Mediaeval church in Cloughton, which consisted of a nave, chancel, north aisle, south porch, and bellcote at the west end. It was demolished in 1831, and a replacement was built, to a design by J. Thompson and G. Taylor. It was restored and extended from 1889 to 1890, by Smith, Brodrick and Lowther. The building was Grade II listed in 1951.

The church is built of sandstone on a chamfered plinth, and has a slate roof. It consists of a nave and a chancel under a continuous roof, a north chapel and organ chamber, and a south vestry. On the west gable is a three-light bellcote with Tudor arched corbelled hood moulds. There are Tudor arched doorways in the north and west walls, and the east window has five lights with Perpendicular tracery. A window in the south aisle commemorates Frank Lockwood. On the south wall of the chancel is a marble monument to William and Priscilla Bower, dates 1704, and there is a war memorial tablet designed by Eric Gill.

== See also ==
- Listed buildings in Cloughton
