= Cloughton =

Village and civil parish in North Yorkshire, England

Coordinates: 54°20′09″N 0°26′57″W

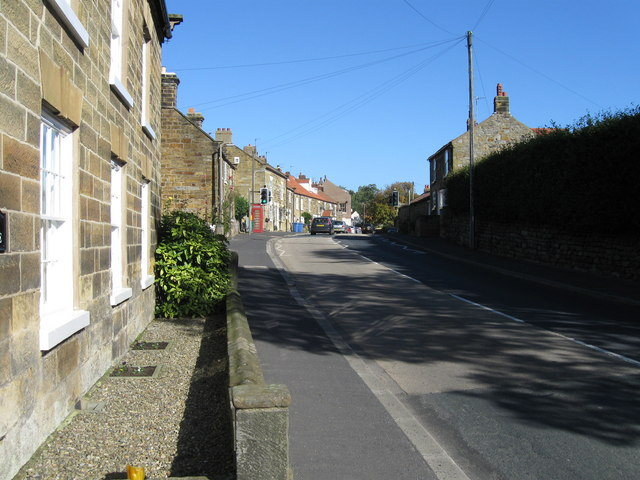
- Village street in Cloughton

- Location within North Yorkshire
- Area: 5.06 sq mi (13.1 km^{2})
- Population: 687 (2011 census)
  - Density: 136/sq mi (53/km^{2})
- OS grid reference: TA008945
- Civil parish: Cloughton
- Unitary authority: North Yorkshire
- Ceremonial county: North Yorkshire
- Region: Yorkshire and the Humber
- Country: England
- Sovereign state: United Kingdom
- Post town: SCARBOROUGH
- Postcode district: YO13
- Dialling code: 01723
- Police: North Yorkshire
- Fire: North Yorkshire
- Ambulance: Yorkshire
- UK Parliament: Scarborough and Whitby

Cloughton (/ˈklaʊtən/ KLAU-tən) is a small village and civil parish in the county of North Yorkshire, England. The civil parish stretches over 3 miles (4.8 km) to the north of the village, 2 miles (3.2 km) to the west, 0.6 miles (0.97 km) to the south, and 1 mile (1.6 km) to the coast to the east. It includes the hamlet of Cloughton Newlands about 1 mile (1.6 km) north of the main village.

Much of the civil parish, but not the village itself, lies within the North York Moors National Park. The Duchy of Lancaster, a private estate of the British sovereign, owns 2,375 acres (961 ha) of land in Cloughton, together with several businesses.

According to the 2011 UK census, the civil parish of Cloughton had a population of 687, a reduction on the 2001 UK census figure of 711. It has an area of 5.06 square miles (13.1 km^{2}).

== History ==
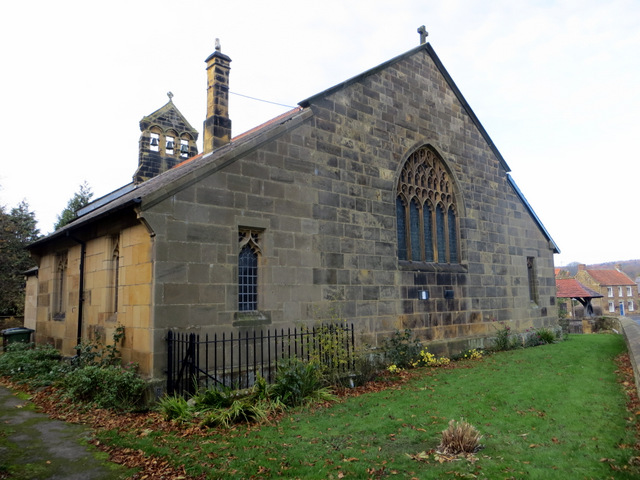
St Mary's church

The settlement is mentioned in the Domesday Book as Cloctune, and translates from Old English as the town (tūn) in the valley (clōh). Historically the village was in the wapentake of Pickering Lythe in the North Riding of Yorkshire.

There has been a church in Cloughton since mediaeval times, but the existing St Mary's Church dates from 1831, when its predecessor was demolished. In the same year, Cloughton became part of the parish of Scalby, along with Burniston, Newby, Staintondale and Throxenby. In 1874, Cloughton was formed into its own chapelry with Burniston and Staintondale. In 1889, St Mary's Church was restored and extended.

In 1974, Cloughton became part of the Borough of Scarborough. In 2023, the borough was abolished, and the parish became part of the unitary authority area of North Yorkshire, which is a subset of the ceremonial county of North Yorkshire.

== Governance ==
In terms of local government, local services are delivered by a mixture of Cloughton Parish Council and North Yorkshire Council. In those parts of the parish that are in the North York Moors National Park, the National Park Authority is the legal planning authority, but in the rest of the parish, North Yorkshire Council has that role.

Nationally, Cloughton forms part of the parliamentary constituency of Scarborough and Whitby.

== Amenities ==
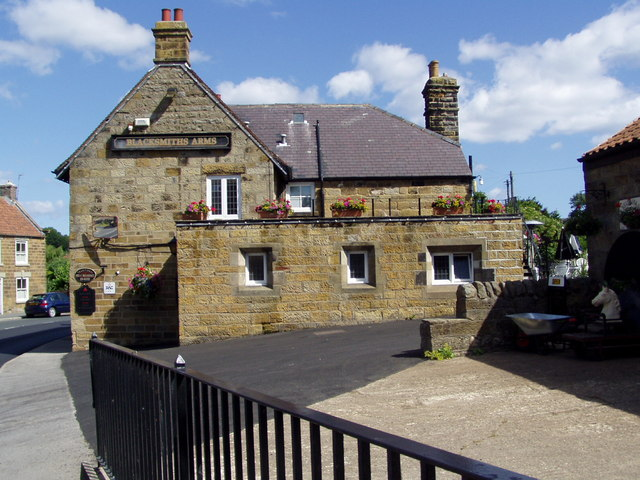
The Blacksmiths Arms

The civil parish has four public houses. In the village itself there are the Blacksmiths Arms and the Red Lion, together with the Bryherstones Country Inn in Cloughton Newlands, and the Hayburn Wyke Inn at Hayburn Wyke.

== Transport ==
Cloughton is situated approximately 5.8 miles (9.3 km) north of Scarborough town centre. The main Scarborough to Whitby road (the A171) runs through the village and carries a regular bus service (the X93) that connects Middlesbrough, Whitby and Scarborough.

Between 1885 and 1965, Cloughton had its own railway station on the line between Whitby and Scarborough, which also served the adjoining village of Burniston. A further station at Hayburn Wyke, on the same line, carried tourists to the nearby coast. The abandoned trackbed of the railway is now the Cinder Track, a popular walking and cycle path connecting Whitby and Scarborough. The coastal section of the Cleveland Way, a long distance footpath that encircles the North York Moors, passes along the coastal clifftops in the east of the civil parish.

== Places of interest ==
=== Hayburn Wyke ===
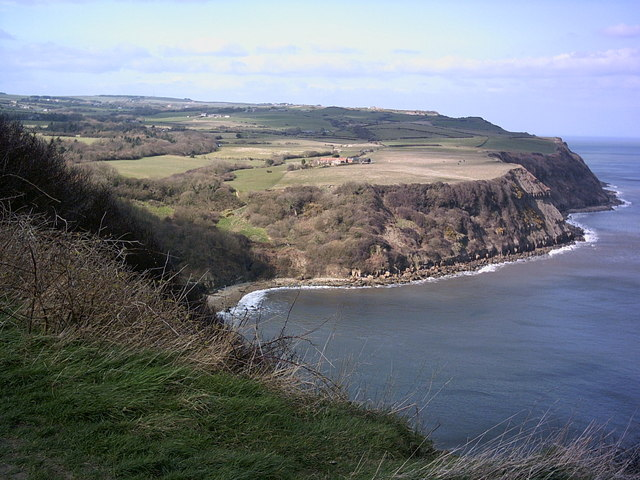
Hayburn Wyke

Hayburn Wyke is a Site of Special Scientific Interest (SSSI) and a secluded bay that is accessible by a short but steep path from the cliff top. The bay features a pebbly beach, and a pair of waterfalls that cascade down from the woods above to the beach below. At the top of the cliffs is the Hayburn Wyke Inn, which offers food, beer and overnight accommodation. Hayburn Wyke can be accessed from either the Cleveland Way coastal path or the Cinder Track, the disused railway track that is now a walking and cycling path, which both run close together at this point. There is also road access to the inn.

=== Iron Scar, Cloughton Wyke and Hundale Point ===
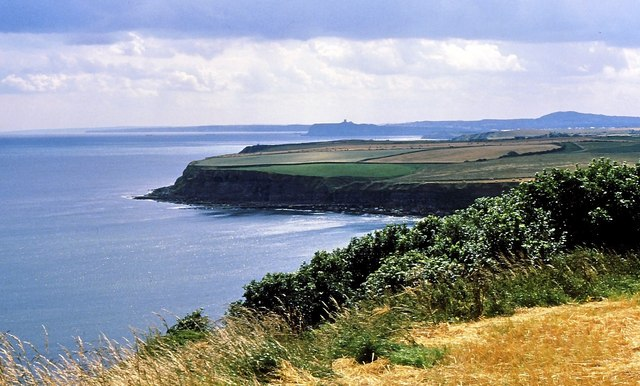
Cloughton Wyke and Hundale Point

Along the coast to the south of Heyburn Wyke lies the promontories of Iron Scar and Hundale Point, with the bay of Cloughton Wyke between them. They form part of a second SSSI, stretching almost to Scarborough, which exposes an important selection of rocks from the Jurassic period. Cloughton Wyke can be accessed from either the Cleveland Way coastal path or by road along Salt Pans Road from Cloughton village. Local maps mark the existence of former salt pans in the bay.

=== Listed buildings ===
The civil parish of Cloughton contains 13 listed structures that are recorded in the National Heritage List for England, all at Grade II (the lowest grade). These include St Mary's Church, dating from 1831, and the Blacksmiths Arms, which dates from the late 17th century. The remainder are mostly houses, together with the village's war memorial.

== Notable people ==
- Sir Frank Lockwood (1846-1897), a lawyer, Liberal Party politician and Solicitor General for England and Wales, lived at Cober Hill in Cloughton. In 1895 he was the lead counsel for the prosecution of Oscar Wilde on charges of sodomy and indecency.
- G. P. Taylor (b.1958), the author of Shadowmancer and Wormwood, was vicar at St Mary's Church.
- Craig White (b.1969), a former Yorkshire and England cricketer, lives in Cloughton.

== Bibliography ==
- Cloughton Conservation Area (PDF). northyorkmoors.org (Report). Scarborough: Scarborough Borough Council. 2011.
- Page, William (1968). The Victoria history of the county of York, North Riding volume 2. London: Dawsons of Pall Mall for the University of London Institute of Historical Research. ISBN 0712903100.
