= Whitby West Cliff railway station =

Former railway station in the North Riding of Yorkshire, England

Whitby West Cliff
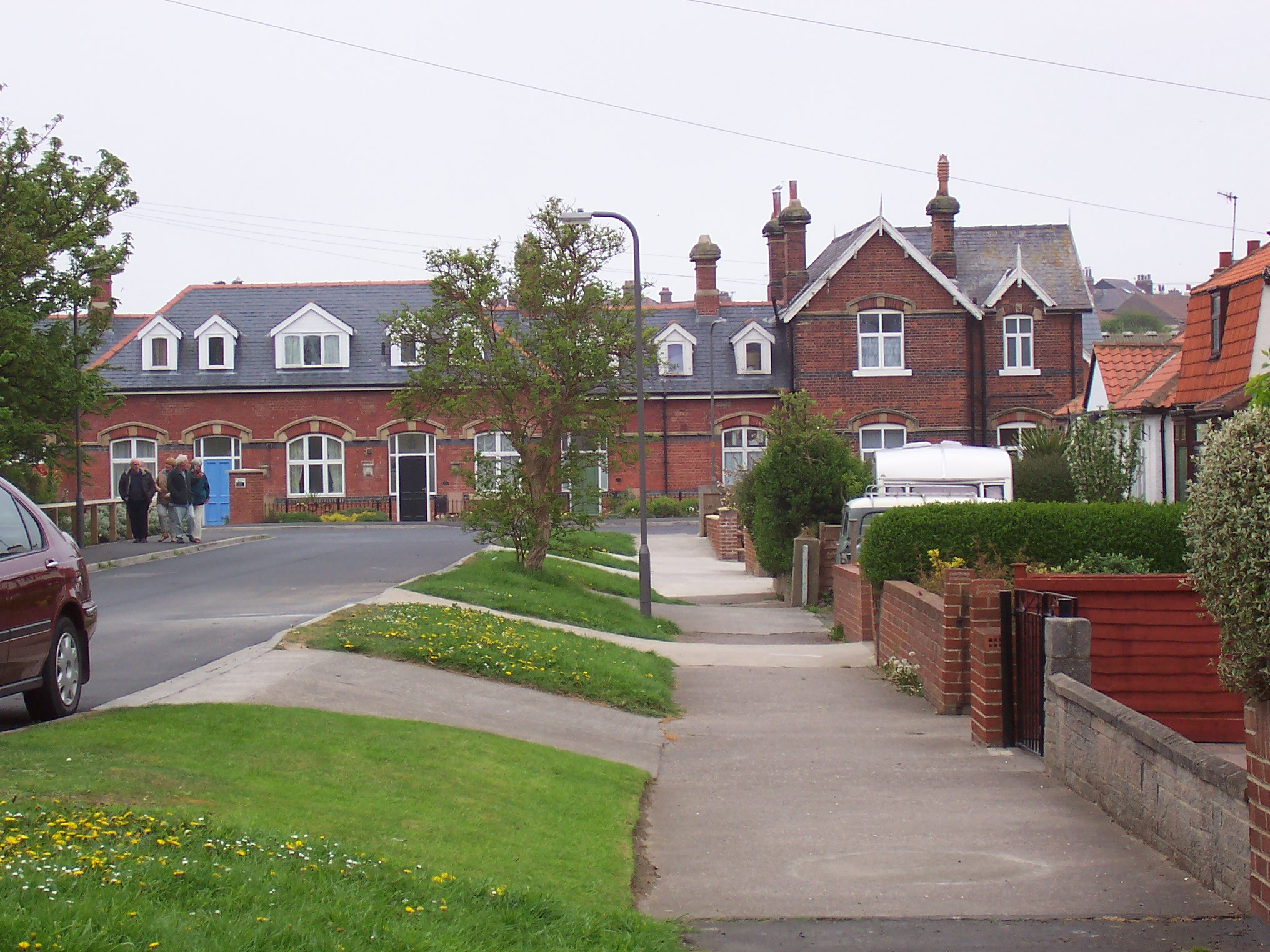
- The former station on Whitby's West Cliff

General information
- Location: Whitby, North Yorkshire; England
- Coordinates: 54.487708°N 0.628000°W
- Grid reference: NZ889111
- Platforms: 2 (3 in the 1930s)

Other information
- Status: Disused

History
- Original company: WR&MUR
- Pre-grouping: North Eastern Railway

Key dates
- 3 December 1883: Opened
- 12 June 1961: Closed
Location

Whitby West Cliff railway station was a railway station on the Whitby Redcar and Middlesbrough Union Railway. It was opened on 3 December 1883, to serve the West Cliff area of the town of Whitby, North Yorkshire, England. It was one of two stations serving Whitby; the other was Whitby Town railway station, which served the lines to Malton and Battersby.

West Cliff closed on 12 June 1961 meaning trains from Scarborough had to reverse at Prospect Hill Junction to go to Whitby Town.

== History ==
The station was opened in December 1883, when the extension from Loftus opened southwards towards Whitby. South of the station, an incline allowed trains to descend to the railway station in Whitby town. In July 1885, a second line from the south was opened which spanned the River Esk over Larpool Viaduct. This line was the Scarborough and Whitby Railway and meant that trains for Whitby from Scarborough, had to reverse at West Cliff station to enable them to terminate in Whitby Town railway station. This procedure continued until 1961, when the trains reversed at Prospect Hill Junction.

It originally had nameboards that displayed West Cliff only. This was changed as many people did not know that they had arrived in Whitby, and so travelled on to Hawsker, the next station down the line.

West Cliff was 15 miles (24 km) south of Loftus and 21.5 miles (34.6 km) north of Scarborough. Whitby Town station was 1 mile 36 chains (2.3 km) east of West Cliff via a loop line that went through Prospect Hill and Bog Hall junctions. From West Cliff to Prospect Hill was a downhill gradient of 1-in-60, and from Prospect Hill to Bog Hall was 1-in-52.

Although the station was built with a goods yard (at the north eastern end of the southbound platform), most goods traffic was handled at Whitby Town. In the 1950s, the only commodity being handled at West Cliff was coke and coal. The station had two platforms, with a third line on the western side which allowed steam hauled trains to and from Scarborough to run around their trains, though from 1955, shorter trains were propelled up from Whitby Town and left across Larpool viaduct without having to reverse. As some trains from Scarborough and Saltburn went through without reversing down to Whitby Town, a shuttle service was introduced using Sentinel steam railcars. This led to the LNER converting the horse dock at the south end of the station into a third platform.

The line north from West Cliff closed in May 1958 and thereafter, the station was the reversing location for trains between Whitby Town and Scarborough. The station closed completely in June 1961. Services for the Scarborough and Whitby Line reversed at Prospect Hill Junction until closure of that line in 1965.

After closure, the site was used as a storage facility and then as offices for the local water board. The main buildings on the southbound platform were later converted into private dwellings named Beechings Mews. Some writers have pointed out the irony that the station was closed before the Beeching axe.

Preceding station	Disused railways	Following station
Sandsend; Line and station closed	North Eastern Railway; WR&MU	Whitby Town; Line closed, station open
Hawsker; Line and station closed	North Eastern Railway; Scarborough & Whitby Railway	Terminus
