= Staintondale =

Village and civil parish in North Yorkshire, England

Coordinates: 54.372500°N 0.477300°W

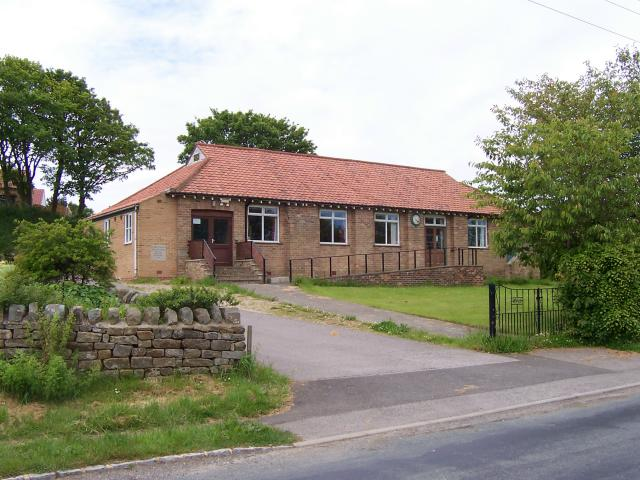
- Staintondale village hall

- Location within North Yorkshire
- Population: 341 (2011 census)
- OS grid reference: SE990985
- Civil parish: Staintondale
- Unitary authority: North Yorkshire
- Ceremonial county: North Yorkshire
- Region: Yorkshire and the Humber
- Country: England
- Sovereign state: United Kingdom
- Post town: SCARBOROUGH
- Postcode district: YO13
- Police: North Yorkshire
- Fire: North Yorkshire
- Ambulance: Yorkshire
- UK Parliament: Scarborough and Whitby

Staintondale (or Stainton Dale) is a small village and civil parish in the county of North Yorkshire, England. The village is situated 7 miles (11 km) north west of Scarborough town centre. The parish also includes the village of Ravenscar, 2 miles (3 km) north of the village of Staintondale, and the whole parish lies within the North York Moors National Park.

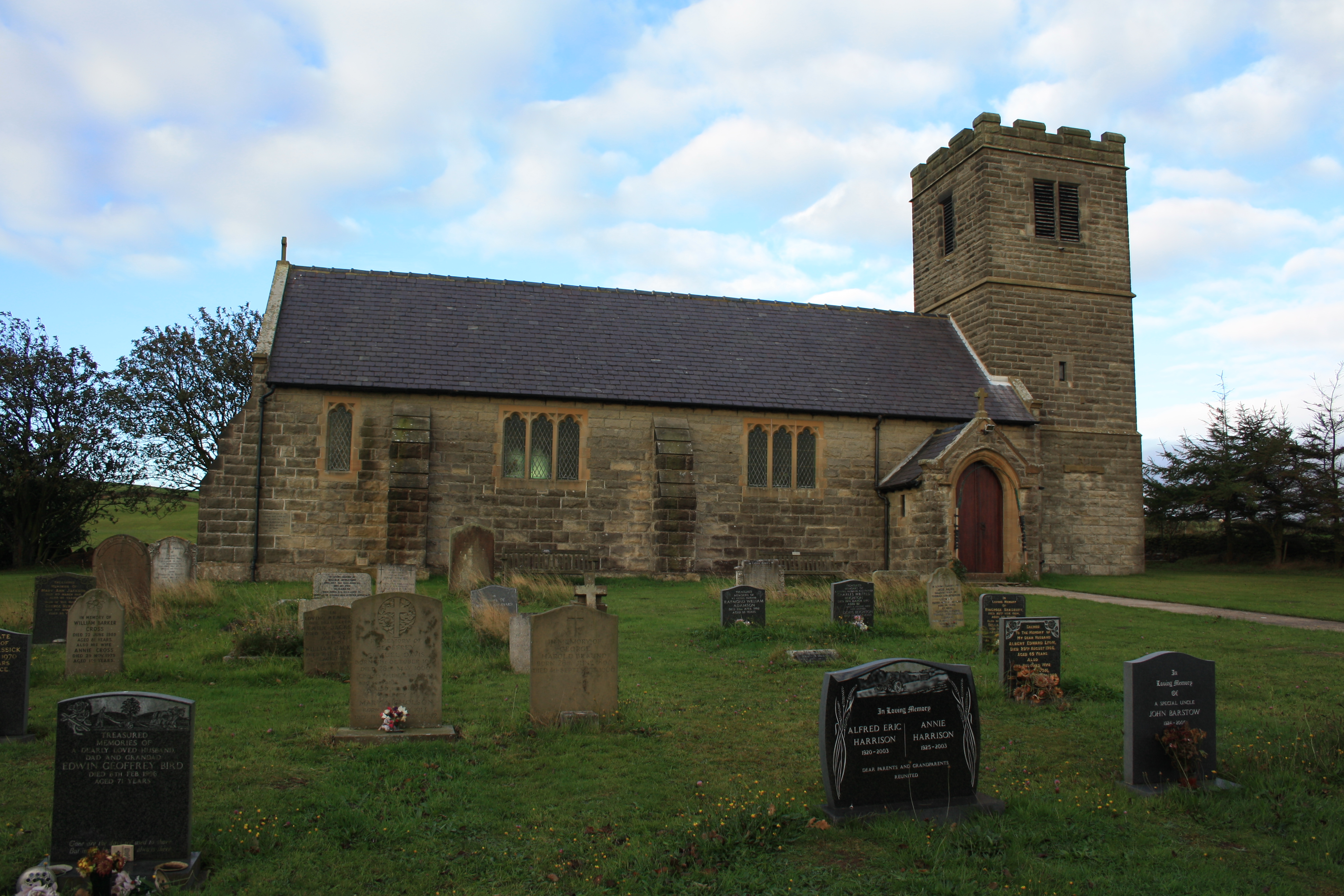
St John the Baptist's Church

According to the 2011 UK census, Stainton Dale parish had a population of 341, an increase on the 2001 UK census figure of 319 - note these figures includes Ravenscar as well as Staintondale.

The parish council is Staintondale Parish Council.

From 1974 to 2023 it was part of the Borough of Scarborough. It is now administered by the unitary North Yorkshire Council.

The name Staintondale derives from the Old English stāntūndæl meaning 'stone settlement in the dale'.

== History ==
Staintondale was historically a township in the ancient parish of Scalby. It became a separate civil parish in 1866.

The village was served by Staintondale railway station on the Scarborough and Whitby Railway from 1885 until it closed in 1965.

== See also ==
- Listed buildings in Staintondale
