= Larpool Viaduct =

Railway viaduct in North Yorkshire, England

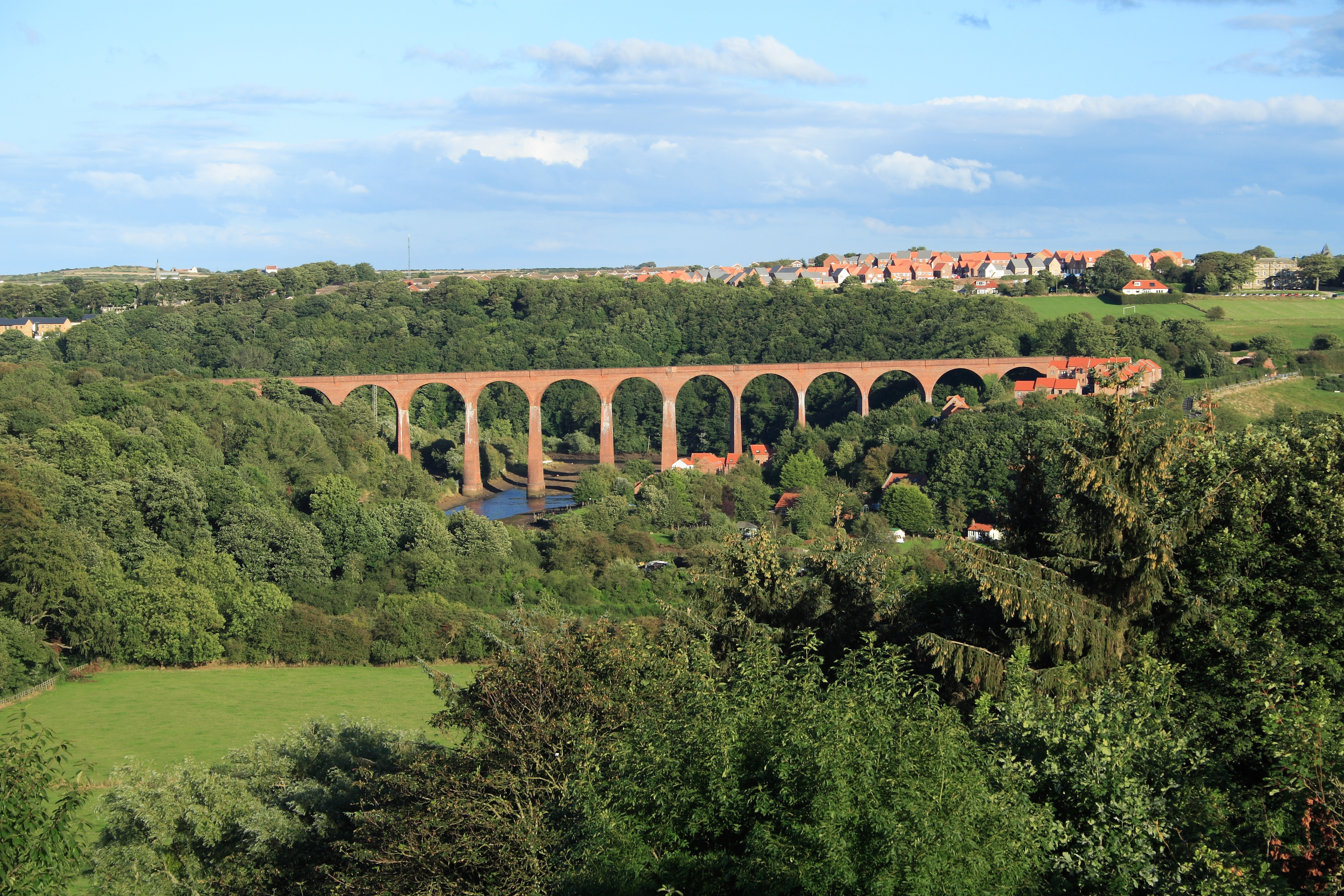
- Coordinates: 54.474500°N 0.618450°W
- Carries: Foot and cycle path, formerly single track railway line

Characteristics
- Total length: 305 yd (279 m)
- Height: 120 ft (37 m)
- No. of spans: 13

History
- Opened: c. 1885

Statistics

Listed Building – Grade II
- Designated: 4 December 1972
- Reference no.: 1366577

Location
- Interactive map of Larpool Viaduct

Larpool Viaduct, also known as the Esk Valley Viaduct, is a 13-arch brick viaduct built to carry the Scarborough & Whitby Railway over the River Esk, North Yorkshire, England. Today it carries the Cinder Track, a multi-use trail used by walkers, cyclists and horse-riders that links Whitby and Scarborough.

== History and description ==
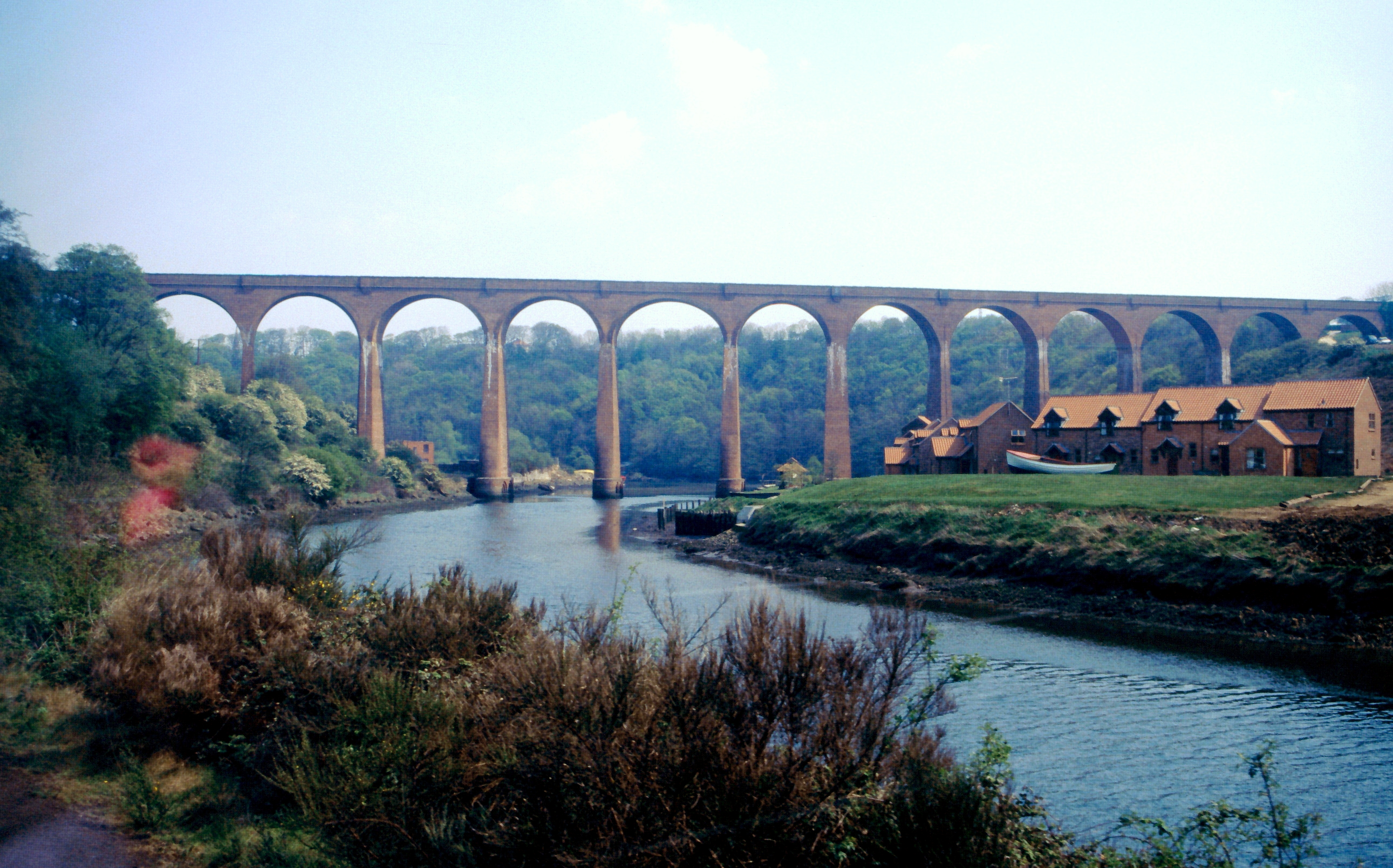
Western side of the Larpool Viaduct with the River Esk in front

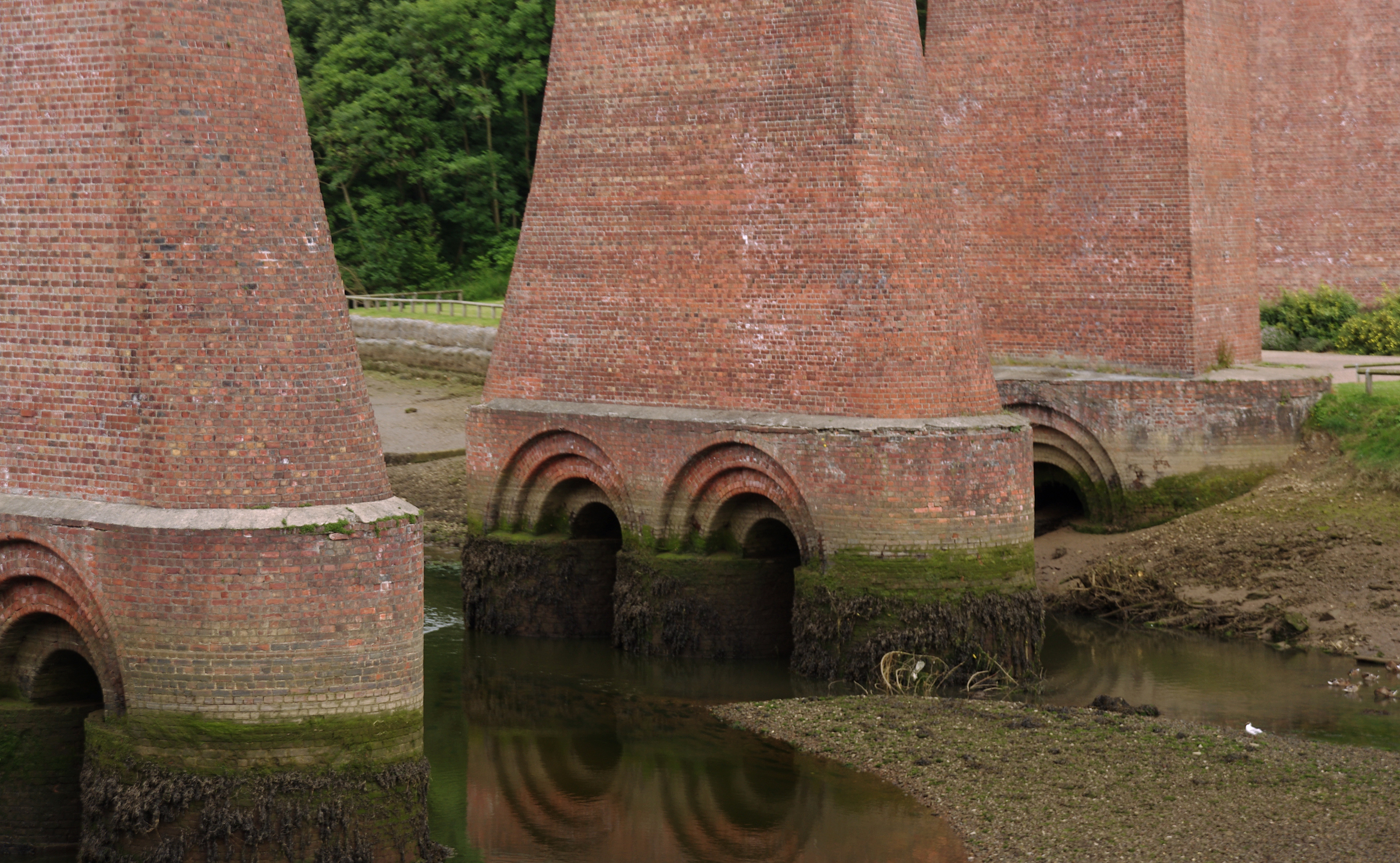
Triple foundations on the river piers

The viaduct was constructed for the Scarborough and Whitby Railway to carry a single-track line over the River Esk and valley near Whitby, as well as crossing the Esk Valley Railway, and Whitby, Redcar and Middlesbrough Union Railway. Due to its situation close to the sea the design avoided the use of iron, using brick and cement construction; the design was based on the Saltburn Viaduct. Construction began in October 1882 and was complete by October 1884; two men fell from the piers during construction, but recovered. The resident engineer was Charles Arthur Rowlandson, the contractors were John Waddell and Sons.

The viaduct is a 13-arch structure, 305 yd (279 m) long, with the rail level reaching 120 ft (37 m) high. The foundations on land were excavated to the level of rock, and formed from slag based cement. The river foundations were excavated in brick lined wells. The river foundation excavations were complicated by large oak trees found embedded in the river that required divers for manual removal. Piers 5,7,8 and 9 had triple foundations, connected above the water level by two semicircular arches. Three of the piers in the river are skewed so as not to deflect the tidal flow (the River Esk is tidal as far as Ruswarp upstream).

The main arches are 55 to 65 ft (17 to 20 m) wide, and 27 ft 6 in (8.38 m) high, made of bricks seven deep, 2 ft 9 in (0.84 m). The width between the parapets is 14 ft 6 in (4.42 m) on straight sections.

Services on the line ended in March 1965 as a result of the Beeching Report.

The viaduct became grade II listed in 1972. In 2000 much of the former line and the viaduct were opened to the public. By 2006 parts of the brickwork had become unsafe due to spalling, and the parts of the outer layer were replaced. As of 2012 the viaduct is part of the 'Scarborough to Whitby Rail Trail', also promoted as the "Scarborough to Whitby Cinder Track", a cycle route.

The viaduct is mentioned in Bram Stoker's 1897 novel Dracula:

The little river, the Esk, runs through a deep valley, which broadens out as it comes near the harbour. A great viaduct runs across, with high piers, through which the view seems somehow further away than it really is.

— Dracula, Chap.6, Mina Murray's Journal.

== See also ==
- List of crossings of the River Esk, North Yorkshire
- Listed buildings in Whitby (outer areas)
