= Gallows Close goods yard =

Disused railway freight yard in Scarborough, North Yorkshire, England

General information
- Location: Scarborough, North Yorkshire; England
- Coordinates: 54.2785°N 0.4117°W
- Grid reference: TA035881

Other information
- Status: Disused

History
- Pre-grouping: North Eastern Railway
- Post-grouping: London and North Eastern Railway

Key dates
- 1899: Goods yard opened
- 1985: Goods yard closed
Location

Gallows Close goods yard was a freight transfer yard on the Scarborough and Whitby Railway in the town of Scarborough, North Yorkshire, England. The yard was opened in 1899 to relieve pressure on the main station in Scarborough and to release space for passenger use. After the Scarborough and Whitby Railway closed down, Gallows Close remained in use as a goods yard until final closure came in 1985.

== History ==
Gallows Close is located on the north western edge of Scarborough town centre and is so named as it was the site of a gallows through the Middle Ages and Early modern period. The site was originally intended to be the terminus of the Scarborough and Whitby Railway in the town, but eventually the 260-yard (240 m) Falsgrave Tunnel (Note: Also known as Gallows Close Tunnel.) was dug to connect to Scarborough railway station, albeit via a reversal. The site was purchased by the North Eastern Railway (NER) in the late 1890s from the Scarborough and Whitby Railway Company against the wishes of the line's contractor (John (Paddy) Waddell) who wished to build his own goods depot there. Waddell later took the NER to an arbitration court in London over the matter seeking financial recompense.

In order to provide more space for passengers at Scarborough railway station, the NER built a new goods yard at Gallows Close between 1899 and 1902.

In the early part of the 20th century the main commodities handled at Gallows Close were ale, bricks, fish, coal and manure. The busiest year was 1926 when 100,000 tonnes (110,000 tons) of goods were handled; 13,000 tonnes (14,000 tons) forwarded and 77,000 tonnes (85,000 tons) received. The fan of general sidings were on the west side of the line to Whitby, and required the use of a headshunt if freight was forwarded from the York line through Falsgrave Tunnel. The North Eastern Railway goods shed (built in 1902) and the coal depot, were located on the eastern side of the running line towards Whitby. The coal depot at Gallows Close was furnished with an electric conveyor in November 1946, the first instance of this happening on the London and North Eastern Railways' area of operation.

Other traffic used the goods yard too; a regular annual traffic was a travelling circus which unloaded at Gallows Close before touring the area. Another commodity handled was something that was euphemistically listed as night soil; human waste that was collected from doorsteps in the town and later used as a fertiliser.

Coal and oil remained the final commodities handled at Gallows Close, and was withdrawn in 1985 (Note: Bairstow states in "The Railways of Whitby volume 1" that it closed in 1981.) allowing the removal of Gallows Close from the British Rail system, though sporadic freight handling continued at Scarborough until 1991, when the Speedlink network was closed. Oil traffic was converted into a block train that ran on an ad hoc basis to a terminal on the main line. This working ceased in the early 1990s.

The lines were removed from the yard in 1986, whereas Falsgrave Tunnel was filled in when the site of Gallows Close goods yard became a supermarket in the 1990s. The site is now the southern end of the Scarborough to Whitby Rail Trail.
