= Scarborough and Whitby Railway =

Disused railway line in Yorkshire, England

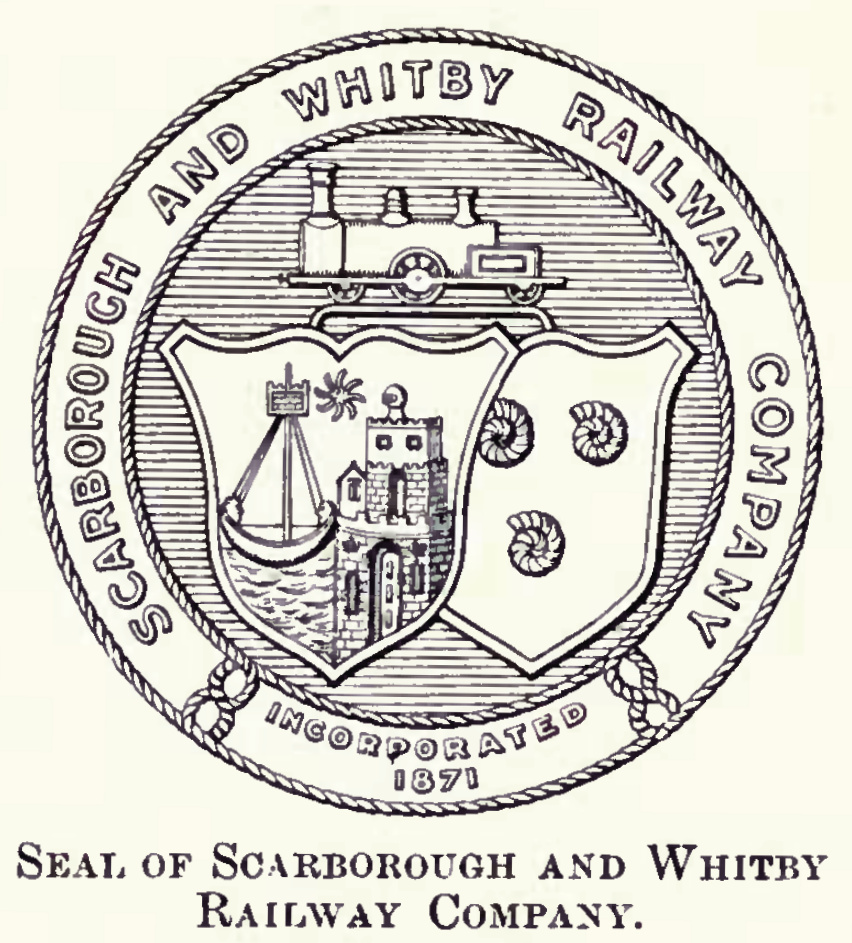

Overview
- Dates of operation: 1885–1965
- Successor: North Eastern Railway

Technical
- Track gauge: 4 ft 8 1/2 in (1,435 mm) standard gauge
- Length: 20 1/2 miles (33 km)

The Scarborough and Whitby Railway was a railway line from Scarborough to Whitby in North Yorkshire, England. The line followed a difficult but scenic route along the North Yorkshire coast.

The line opened in 1885 and closed in 1965 as part of the Beeching Axe. The route, now a multi-use path, is known as the Cinder Track.

== History ==
=== Background ===
Before the line's construction, several schemes had been proposed that would have resulted in a line between Scarborough and Whitby: the Scarborough, Whitby, Stockton-on-Tees and Newcastle and North Junction Railway, from Stockton-on-Tees, via Guisborough to Whitby and then Scarborough was registered in 1845. (Note: At the same time George Hudson was promoting the construction of a harbour and docks at Scarborough.) Another scheme, the Scarborough, Whitby and Staithes Railway, would connect to the Cleveland Railway near Skinningrove, connecting the towns of the Yorkshire coast, and of North Yorkshire; the line was opposed by the North Eastern Railway (NER), who were improving the Esk Valley Line, and it failed to be given assent in the 1864 session of Parliament. (Note: The Cleveland Railway was acquired by the NER in 1865.)

Scarborough and Whitby Railway Act 1865
- Act of Parliament
- Parliament of the United Kingdom
- Long title: An Act for making a Railway from Scarborough to Whitby.
- Citation: 28 & 29 Vict. c. cclxxii

Dates
- Royal assent: 5 July 1865

Text of statute as originally enacted

There were other lines promoted to connect along the north coast of Yorkshire between Scarborough and Whitby, including the Scarborough and Whitby Railway Company which issued a prospectus in late 1864. The company placed a bill in parliament, aiming to raise £275,000 capital plus £91,600 in loans, the bill was not opposed in parliament, and the Scarborough and Whitby Railway Act 1865 (28 & 29 Vict. c. cclxxii) was passed at the third reading in April 1865. The line was to be 19 1/4 miles (31.0 km) long, and pass Scalby, Burniston, Cloughton, Stainton-dale, Robin Hood's Bay and Hawsker between Scarborough and Whitby. However, the line sanctioned by the 1865 act was not built due to lack of finance. (Note: The company established by the Scarborough and Whitby Railway Act 1865 (28 & 29 Vict. c. cclxxii) was abandoned after the passing of the Scarborough and Whitby Railway Act 1871 (34 & 35 Vict. c. lxxxv).)

In October 1865 the NER opened a line between Castleton and Grosmont completing a route between Scarborough, Whitby and the ports of the north-east via the North York Moors. The NER had also completed improvement works in July, allowing express trains to travel between the two coastal towns in 90 minutes. The NER ran twice-daily express trains over this route, but the service was not profitable, and was withdrawn.

=== Construction and acquisition, 1872–1898 ===
Efforts to construct a line restarted in 1870; a new route was proposed, and initial estimates of the cost of the line were approximately £100,000 (equivalent to £10,290,000 in 2025). During the same period the Whitby Loftus line was being developed, which with the proposed line would complete the north–south link in the eastern part of the north of the country.

The engineer, Mr. Birch, proposed a line starting at Larpool Hall near Whitby, with a 1 in 40 gradient to a station at Hawsker, then stations at Bay Town (Robin Hood's Bay), near Fyling Hall, at Hayburn Wyke, then a station serving Cloughton and Burniston, then Scalby, before terminating near West Parade in Scarborough. A branch line was proposed, from the start at Crowdy Hill in Whitby connecting to the River Esk, where a wharf would be built.

Scarborough and Whitby Railway Act 1871
- Act of Parliament
- Parliament of the United Kingdom
- Long title: An Act to authorise the making of a Railway from Scarborough to Whitby in the north riding of the county of York; and for other purposes.
- Citation: 34 & 35 Vict. c. lxxxv

Dates
- Royal assent: 29 June 1871

Text of statute as originally enacted

The Scarborough and Whitby Railway Act 1871 (34 & 35 Vict. c. lxxxv), allowing construction of the new line was passed on 29 June 1871.

Construction of the line began on 4 May 1872. The 20 1/2-mile (33 km) line was engineered by Sir Charles Fox and Son, and cost approximately £27,000 (equivalent to £2,640,000 in 2025) per mile. Included in the construction was a large 13-arch brick viaduct over the River Esk near Whitby (see Larpool Viaduct).

Scarborough and Whitby Railway Act 1873
- Act of Parliament
- Parliament of the United Kingdom
- Long title: An Act to authorise the Scarborough and Whitby Railway Company to extend their line to join the North-eastern Railway at Scarborough, and the Whitby, Redcar, and Middlesborough Union Railway near Whitby, to alter the levels of their authorised lines near Whitby; to raise additional capital; and for other purposes.
- Citation: 36 & 37 Vict. c. liii

Dates
- Royal assent: 26 May 1873

Scarborough and Whitby Railway Act 1880
- Act of Parliament
- Parliament of the United Kingdom
- Long title: An Act to revive the powers and extend the periods for the compulsory purchase of Lands, and for the construction of the Railways authorised by the Scarborough and Whitby Railway Acts, 1871 and 1873; and for other purposes.
- Citation: 43 & 44 Vict. c. clxiii

Dates
- Royal assent: 12 August 1880

Text of statute as originally enacted

Scarborough and Whitby Railway Act 1884
- Act of Parliament
- Parliament of the United Kingdom
- Long title: An Act for empowering the Scarborough and Whitby Railway Company to raise additional capital and for other purposes.
- Citation: 47 & 48 Vict. c. xcix

Dates
- Royal assent: 3 July 1884

The company needed further acts allowing it to raise extra capital for, and to extend the timescale of the construction, and to make connections with lines in Whitby and Scarborough. In 1878–9 shortage of funds led to the possibility of the scheme being abandoned.

North Eastern Railway Act 1898
- Act of Parliament
- Parliament of the United Kingdom
- Long title: An Act to confer additional powers upon the North Eastern Railway Company for the construction of new railways and other works and the acquisition of additional lands and for amalgamating the Scarborough and Whitby Railway Company with the Company and for other purposes.
- Citation: 61 & 62 Vict. c. cxcvii

Dates
- Royal assent: 2 August 1898

Text of statute as originally enacted

The line was opened on 16 July 1885. The NER operated the line until the company acquired the railway for £261,633, less than half its capital cost, under the North Eastern Railway Act 1898 (61 & 62 Vict. c. cxcvii).

=== Operation, 1898–1965 ===
The line passed into the hands of the London and North Eastern Railway at the 1923 Grouping. At the southern end of the route, the goods yard at Gallows Close (north of Falsgrave Tunnel) was expanded for use as a carriage yard in the busy summer months, with excursions routed via the overspill station at Scarborough Londesborough Road sent there for storage between turns. This practice continued after nationalisation of the railway system in 1948.

During its operational lifetime the Scarborough and Whitby line became notoriously impracticable and difficult to work. The junction layouts at both ends of the line (Prospect Hill in Whitby and Falsgrave in Scarborough) meant that trains had to reverse direction in order to gain access to the route. These movements, particularly in the days of steam, were time-consuming and disrupted the movement of other trains. This problem was especially acute at Scarborough, where Scarborough Central station was extremely busy during the summer months. The route itself was steeply graded in both directions (1 in 39 being the steepest) and its location along the coast meant that the rails were often slippery due to rain and sea mists. This made driving conditions in bad weather extremely difficult and great skill was needed from the engine crews to prevent trains from stalling on the climbs.

Services were dieselised at the beginning of the 1960s. This did much to resolve the reversal issues at Whitby and Scarborough but even these new trains were found to struggle with the gradients, and services were often disrupted when weather and sea conditions were poor. Increasing road competition and a consequent drop in passenger usage outside of the peak summer seasons ultimately led to the route being proposed for closure in the 1963 Beeching Report along with both of the others serving Whitby. A public outcry followed, but this was not enough to keep the line open and it closed to all traffic from 8 March 1965. The closure of the line was marked by the Whitby Moors Rail Tour run by the Stephenson Locomotive Society and the Manchester Locomotive Society and was hauled by preserved LNER Class K4 2-6-0 no. 3442 The Great Marquess and York shed's K1 2-6-0 no. 62005 (which resides at the North Yorkshire Moors Railway in the care of the North Eastern Locomotive Preservation Group (NELPG).

=== Post-closure ===
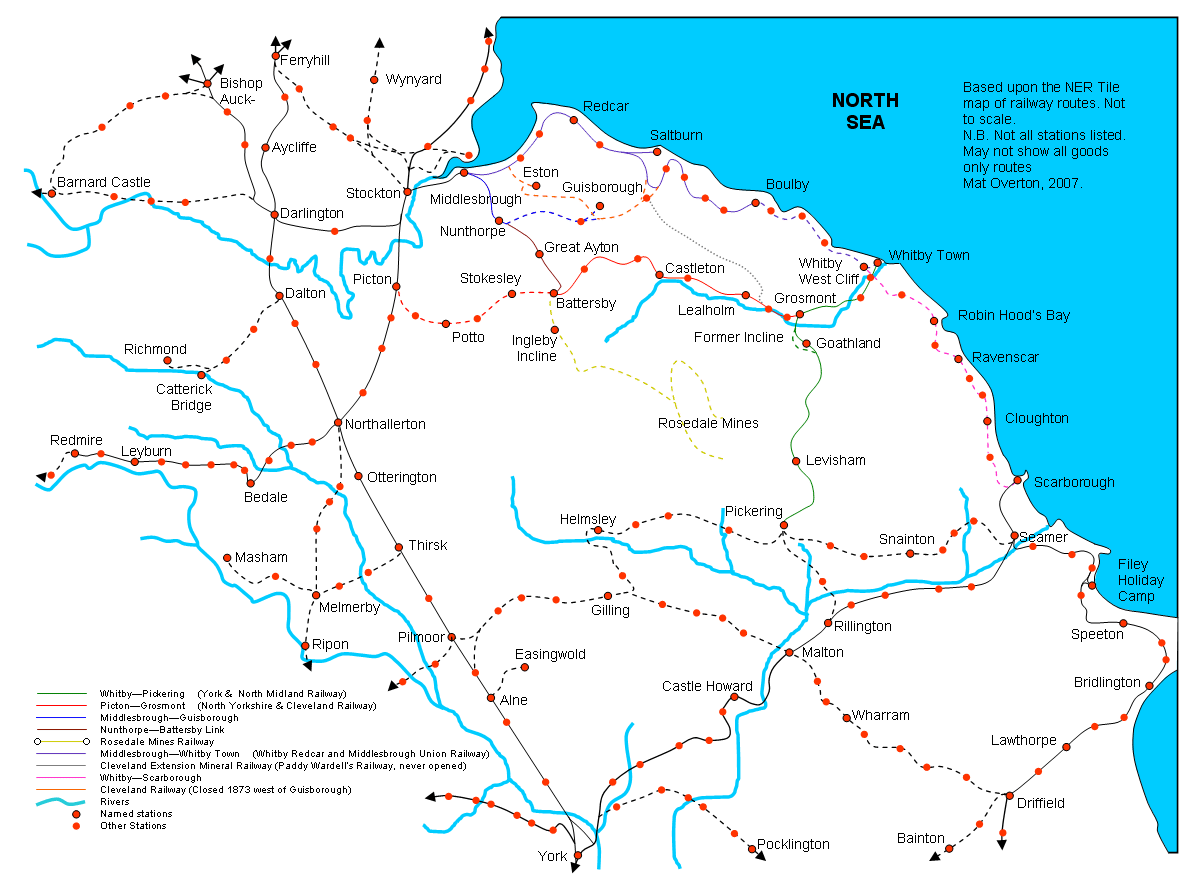
Map of route and surrounding railways

The track was subsequently lifted in 1968, although speculation about a potential potash mine near Hawsker meant that the track from there to Whitby remained in place until 1972.

In the 1980s an area of the former line in the Northstead district of Scarborough was briefly used as football and cricket pitches.

The line is now used as a bridleway for cycles, pedestrians and horses, known as the "Scarborough to Whitby Rail Trail", "Scarborough to Whitby Cinder Track", or simply "The Cinder Track".

In 2018 plans to spend £3.5 million to repair and improve the Cinder Track were backed by Scarborough Borough Council. The plans would see the route resurfaced, drainage improved and the creation of a new management body to oversee the development of the track. There is also the possibility of introducing a visitor centre, cafe and pay and display parking to generate ongoing funding to maintain the route. Work upgrading the track began in January 2020 and the first stage is now complete. Local improvements continue to be funded as part of the Town Deal offered by the UK government.
