= Boulby line =

Railway in North-East England

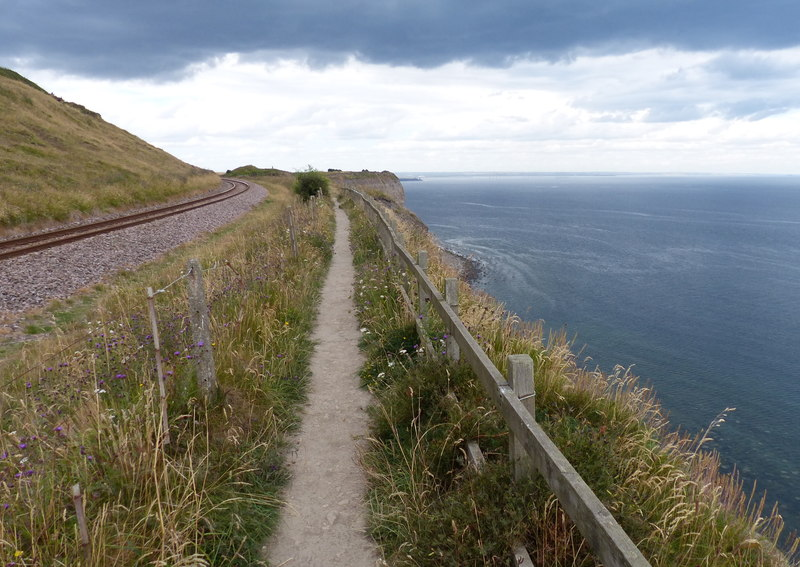
- Cleveland Way at Hunt Cliff with the railway adjacent

Overview
- Other name(s): Boulby branch Saltburn and Boulby branch
- Status: Open
- Owner: Network Rail, ICL
- ELR: SSK
- Locale: Redcar and Cleveland, England
- Termini: Saltburn West Junction; Boulby Mine

Service
- Type: Heavy rail Railfreight
- Operator(s): DB Cargo; Freightliner

Technical
- Line length: 12 miles 5 chains (19.4 km)
- Number of tracks: 1
- Track gauge: 1,435 mm (4 ft 8 1/2 in) standard gauge

The Boulby line is a freight-only railway line in Redcar and Cleveland, England. The line was opened in stages between 1865 and 1882, being part of two railways that met at Brotton railway station. Passenger trains along the line ceased in 1960, and since then it has been a freight-only line dedicated to the potash and polyhalite traffic from Boulby, and steel products into Skinningrove Steelworks.

== History ==
The line between Guisborough, Brotton, Skinningrove and Loftus (the Cleveland Railway), was opened between 1865 and 1867, looping north from Brotton and hugging the coast around the edge of Hunt Cliff. The 4.5-mile (7.2 km) section of line from Saltburn West Junction to Brotton over Skelton Beck on Saltburn Viaduct was approved in 1865. It opened to goods traffic in 1872, and later to passengers in 1875, although North Skelton station did not open to passengers until 1902. The purpose of the Saltburn Extension line was so that ironstone trains from the Brotton and Loftus areas could have easy access to the steel and iron plants east of Middlesbrough, as the Cleveland Railway route past Guisborough and through Nunthorpe required a reversal at Middlesbrough station. These lines had been opened by either the Middlesbrough and Guisborough Railway, or the Cleveland Railway; however, between 1863 and 1865, they came under the aegis of the North Eastern Railway. The looping nature of the line around Hunt Cliff was due to the presence of mining activity on the cliff top. The line could have been engineered to go under Warsett Hill direct from Brotton to the Carlin How/Skinningrove area.

The opening of the Whitby, Redcar and Middlesbrough Union Railway (WR&MU) south of Loftus from 1883, saw passenger services work from Saltburn to Scarborough via Whitby West Cliff railway station. Services from Saltburn had to propel (reverse out) back to Saltburn West Junction to continue south. These propelling, or reversing moves, were a feature of whichever direction the passenger service trains took northwards from Loftus; they either had to reverse into Saltburn, or reverse into Guisborough whilst on their way to Middlesbrough. The service from Saltburn to Loftus had started as far back as April 1875, and then, along with the opening of the Scarborough and Whitby Railway, extended along the coast line towards Scarborough. However, in 1932, services to and from Scarborough were diverted away from Saltburn to terminate/start at Middlesbrough instead, and the local service from Brotton to Saltburn ceased in 1951.

The Whitby, Redcar and Middlesbrough Union Railway (WR&MU), which ran south of Loftus, closed in May 1958. The line was said to be unprofitable by British Rail, and also the high cost of maintaining the tunnels and the iron viaducts along the line for the next five years (£57,000 estimated (equivalent to £1,194,000 in 2025)). The last passenger services along what would become the Boulby line were between Loftus and Middlesbrough (via Guisborough), and these ceased in May 1960, when the line became freight only. Freight for Loftus continued until August 1963, and then the track was lifted northwards to Skinningrove Steelworks. Between closure to passengers and 1969, the line from Skinningrove to Saltburn West remained double track and signalled as absolute block. In 1969, the line was singled, the signalling method changed to token signalling, and the line speed reduced to 30 miles per hour (48 km/h).

The location of potash and polyhalite under the cliffs and coast area of Whitby, led to the resurgence of part of the old WR&MU, which now forms the southern section of the Boulby Line. In 1974, Four miles (6.4 km) of railway was re-instated between Crag Hall Junction and Boulby Mine (some 1-mile (1.6 km) north of Staithes railway station). The Boulby line is 12 miles 5 chains (19.4 km) in length, and has an engineer's line reference of SSK.

Commodities carried on the line include steel, potash, polyhalite and rock salt. Historically, scrap metal was taken by rail from the Skinningrove works to Lackenby on Teesside, but this working ceased in 1989/1990 as the wagons were life-expired, and the investment in new wagons could not be justified. Oil was also carried to Boulby Mine. The line southwards from Crag Hall Junction is owned by the same company that operates Boulby Mine. The numbers of trains plying the route varies with demand of its two freight concerns; as of 2018, just two trains of loaded potash were being despatched daily to Middlesbrough Goods terminal, and one steel train was inward-bound to Skinningrove steelworks from Middlesbrough. In 2023, the Freightliner group signed a new contract with ICL to convey potash and polyhalite products from Boulby mine, which resulted in a pattern of between five and eight loaded trains per day.

There have been proposals for the line to be reopened to passenger traffic as far south as Loftus station, even though the distance via rail is 4.5 miles (7.2 km) longer between Loftus and Saltburn than by road. However, the service would not reverse into Saltburn, but carry on to Middlesbrough. In January 2024, £1 million was awarded to the East Cleveland rail feasibility study to investigate opening the line. The study also tried to make use of the "Restoring Your Railway" fund, with proposed stops at Saltburn West, Skelton, Brotton, Loftus, Carlin How and Easington, but their bid was unsuccessful. The economic argument for reinstating passenger services is poor, and figures between £107 million and £328 million have been quoted for reopening.

== See also ==
- Yorkshire Dales Railway, former passenger railway, now a freight only branch
