= Saltburn Viaduct =

Viaduct in Redcar and Cleveland, England

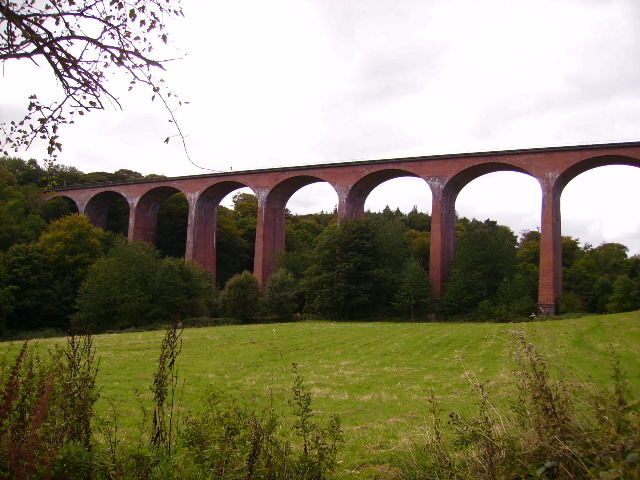
- Saltburn Viaduct
- Coordinates: 54.5721°N 0.9789°W
- OS grid reference: NZ660201
- Carries: Boulby line
- Crosses: Skelton Beck
- Locale: Saltburn-by-the-Sea, North Yorkshire, England
- Other name: See text

Characteristics
- Material: Brick and stone
- Total length: 783 feet (239 m)
- Height: 156 feet (48 m)
- No. of spans: 11
- Piers in water: 2

Rail characteristics
- No. of tracks: 1 (historically two)

History
- Opened: 1 June 1872

Location
- Interactive map of Saltburn Viaduct

Saltburn Viaduct (also known as either Upleatham, Riftswood, or Skelton Beck Viaduct) is a railway bridge in Redcar and Cleveland, North Yorkshire, England. The line was built as an extension of the Redcar and Saltburn Railway, and the viaduct is mostly built out of brick. The line opened to passengers in 1872, but became freight only in 1957, a purpose for which it still is in use for today as part of the Boulby line.

== History ==
Saltburn Viaduct is believed to have been designed by Thomas Elliot Harrison who was the company architect for the North Eastern Railway between 1854 and 1888. The viaduct is the model for the later built (and longer) Larpool Viaduct in Whitby, however, it was found necessary to deviate from the original plan of Saltburn Viaduct when building the one over the River Esk. The Saltburn Extension line, which connected the railway west of Saltburn to Brotton via North Skelton, was authorised in 1865 as part of the amalgamation of the Cleveland Railway into the North Eastern Railway.

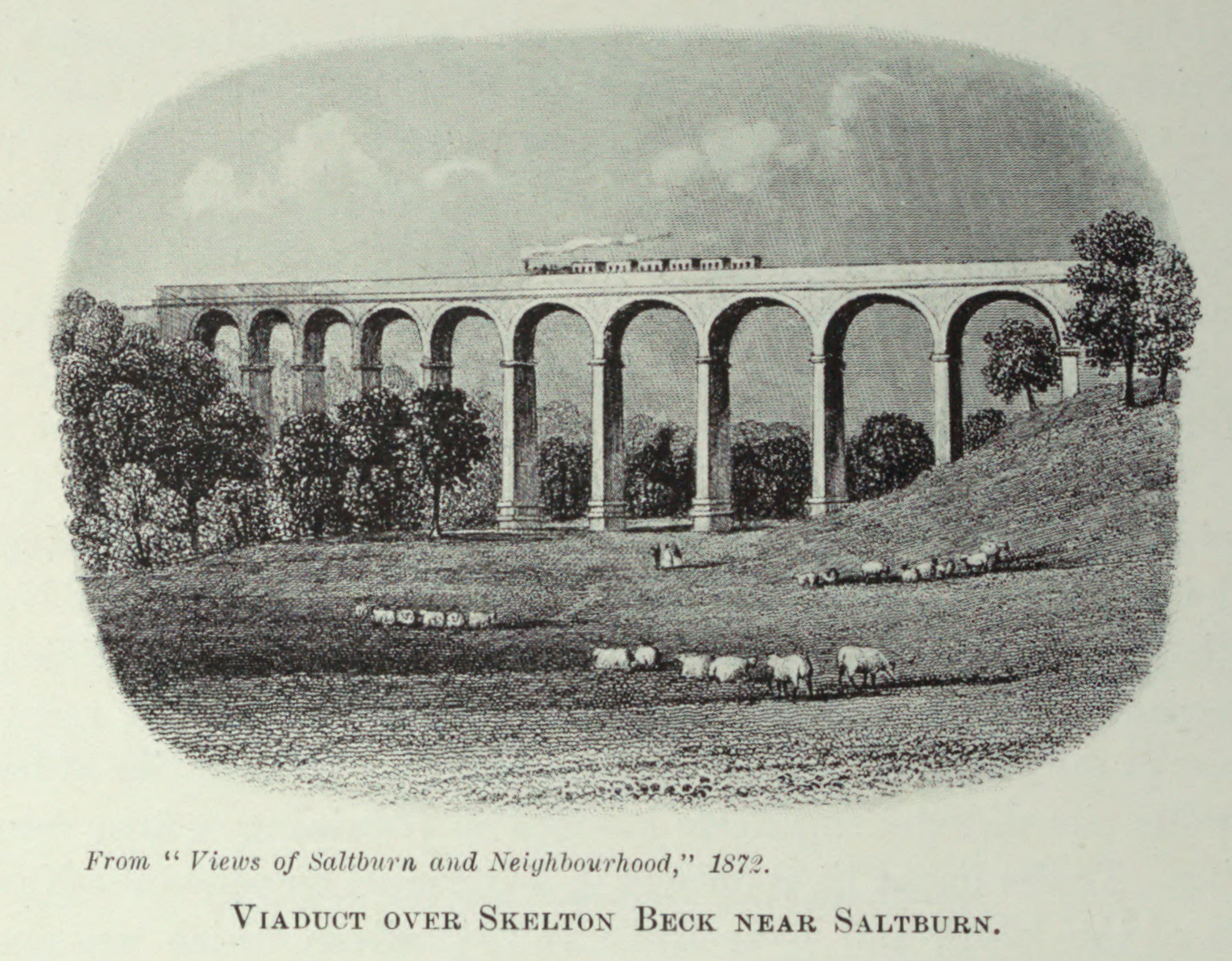
Skelton Beck Viaduct

The viaduct is made mostly from brick, and is the only brick-surviving viaduct in the Cleveland region, others being of stone, or metal, though most have been demolished. (Note: A survey of the mill below the viaduct along the Skelton Beck determined that Mill Farm building had a distinctive "railway architecture" and was possibly where the supervisor of the works was housed during the viaduct's building stage.) However the footings of the viaduct's piers are made from ashlar, and the viaduct rises to a height of 156 feet (48 m), with ten piers and eleven arches, with each arch being 60-foot (18 m) in their span. Two of the piers are set into the bed of Skelton Beck, and the viaduct extends for 738 feet (225 m) in length on a north/south axis. (Note: The length of the viaduct is subject to some dispute; TRACKmaps Eastern has different lengths between publishing the third and fifth editions (17 chains (1,100 ft; 340 m) and 15 chains (990 ft; 300 m) respectively) of the Eastern Region diagrams, and railway codes has it at a length of 17 chains (1,100 ft; 340 m).) One writer described the build of the viaduct as being costly and difficult to construct.

The viaduct carries a freight-only railway line (to Skinningrove Steelworks and Boulby Mine) above Millfield Meadow and Skelton Beck, with the long-distance path the Cleveland Way also passing beneath the viaduct on the north bank of Skelton Beck. When opened, the viaduct had two lines, but the line was singled in 1969, eighteen years after the local passenger service to Brotton from Saltburn had ceased, (Note: Passenger services to Loftus continued until 1960, but from Middlesbrough via Guisborough.) and twelve years since long-distance Scarborough to Middlesbrough passenger trains were diverted away from the line.

It is sometimes referred to as either Upleatham Viaduct, or Skelton Beck Viaduct. Locally it is also known as Riftswood (or Rifts Wood) Viaduct, as the area it spans is called Rifts Wood. It has also been referred to locally as Marske Mill Viaduct, as it overlooked Marske Mill to the north (a corn mill on Skelton Beck). The viaduct marks the western boundary of the Saltburn Conservation Area, and the viaduct was grade II listed in May 1999.

In 2006, £446,000 (equivalent to £815,000 in 2023) was spent on refurbishing the viaduct because of water ingress in some of the bricks. Repairs could not effected using modern engineering bricks as this would have created "hard spots within the structure and the potential for cracking at the interface between old and new...". A suitable brick was found from a brickworks in Birtley, Tyne and Wear.

== See also ==
- Kilton Viaduct
- Slapewath Viaduct
