= Staithes railway station =

Former railway station in the North Riding of Yorkshire, England

Staithes
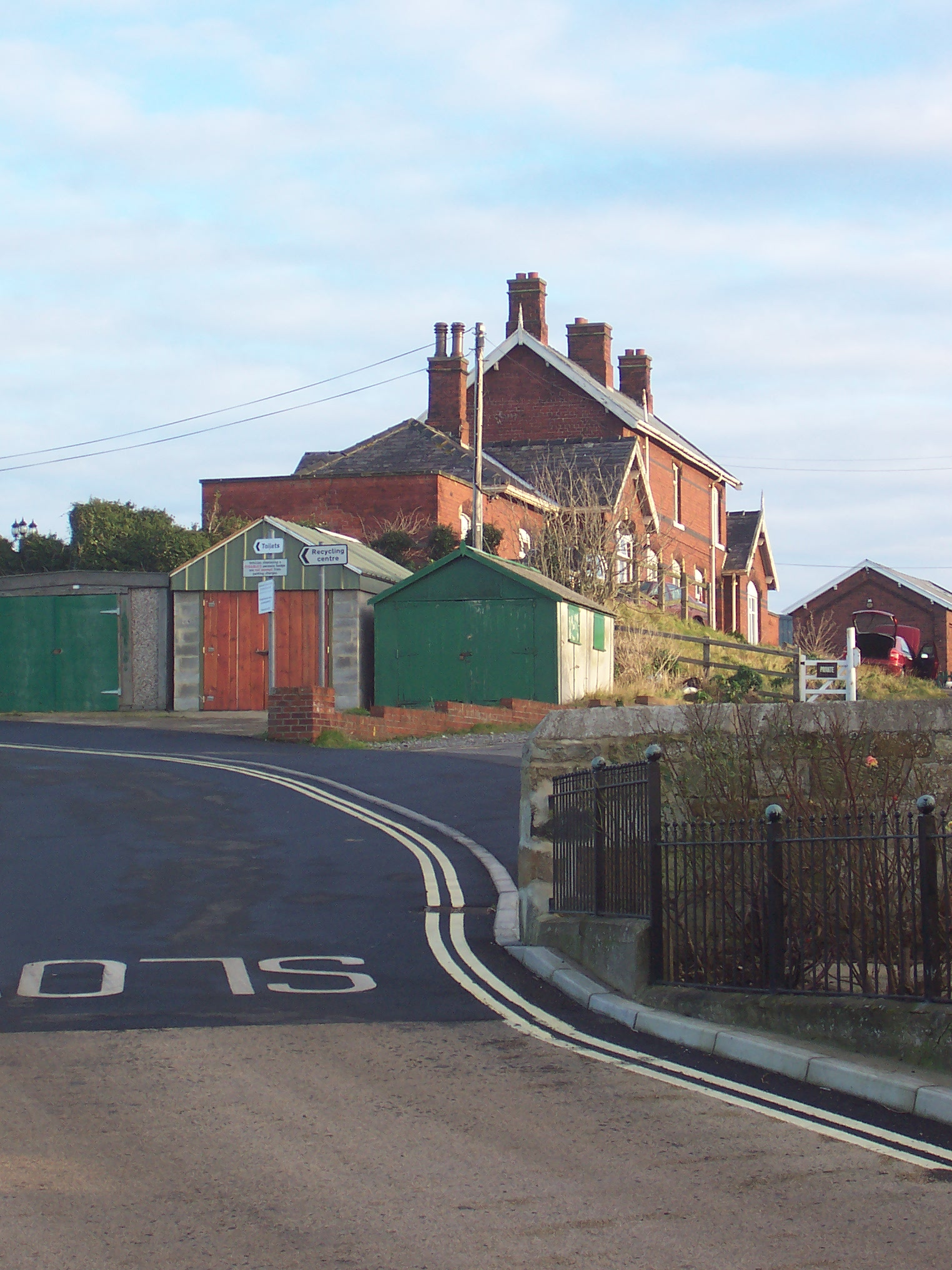
- The former station buildings at Staithes

General information
- Location: Staithes, North Yorkshire; England
- Coordinates: 54.555300°N 0.793000°W
- Grid reference: NZ781185
- Platforms: 2

Other information
- Status: Disused

History
- Original company: WR&MUR
- Pre-grouping: North Eastern Railway

Key dates
- 1883: Opened
- 1958: Closed
Location

Staithes railway station was a railway station on the Whitby Redcar and Middlesbrough Union Railway, serving the villages of Staithes and Dalehouse in North Yorkshire, England. It was opened on 3 December 1883.

== History ==
The line through Staithes had proposals dating back to the late 1860s, but the station did not open until December 1883 after a protracted building process which saw the viaducts on the line strengthened, financial ruin of the contractor and a diversion through the cliffs between Kettleness and Sandsend. The station was 10 miles 15 chains (16.4 km) north of Whitby West Cliff railway station, and 4 miles 68 chains (7.8 km) south of Loftus.

The station was host to a LNER camping coach from 1935 to 1939 and may have had a coach visiting in 1934 and 1935. A coach was also positioned here by the North Eastern Region of British Railways from 1954 to 1958. A goods shed, steam crane and sidings were located on the west side of the station, with a south facing connection. The steam crane was capable of handling up to 2 tonnes (2.2 tons). Like other locations on the Yorkshire coast, Staithes' main export was fish, sometimes in large quantities; in 1913, over 200 tonnes (220 tons) was forwarded from the station. Normally, fish vans were attached to passenger trains to forward their cargo out of the village, however, if the amount of landed fish justified it, special trains were laid on just for the fish traffic.

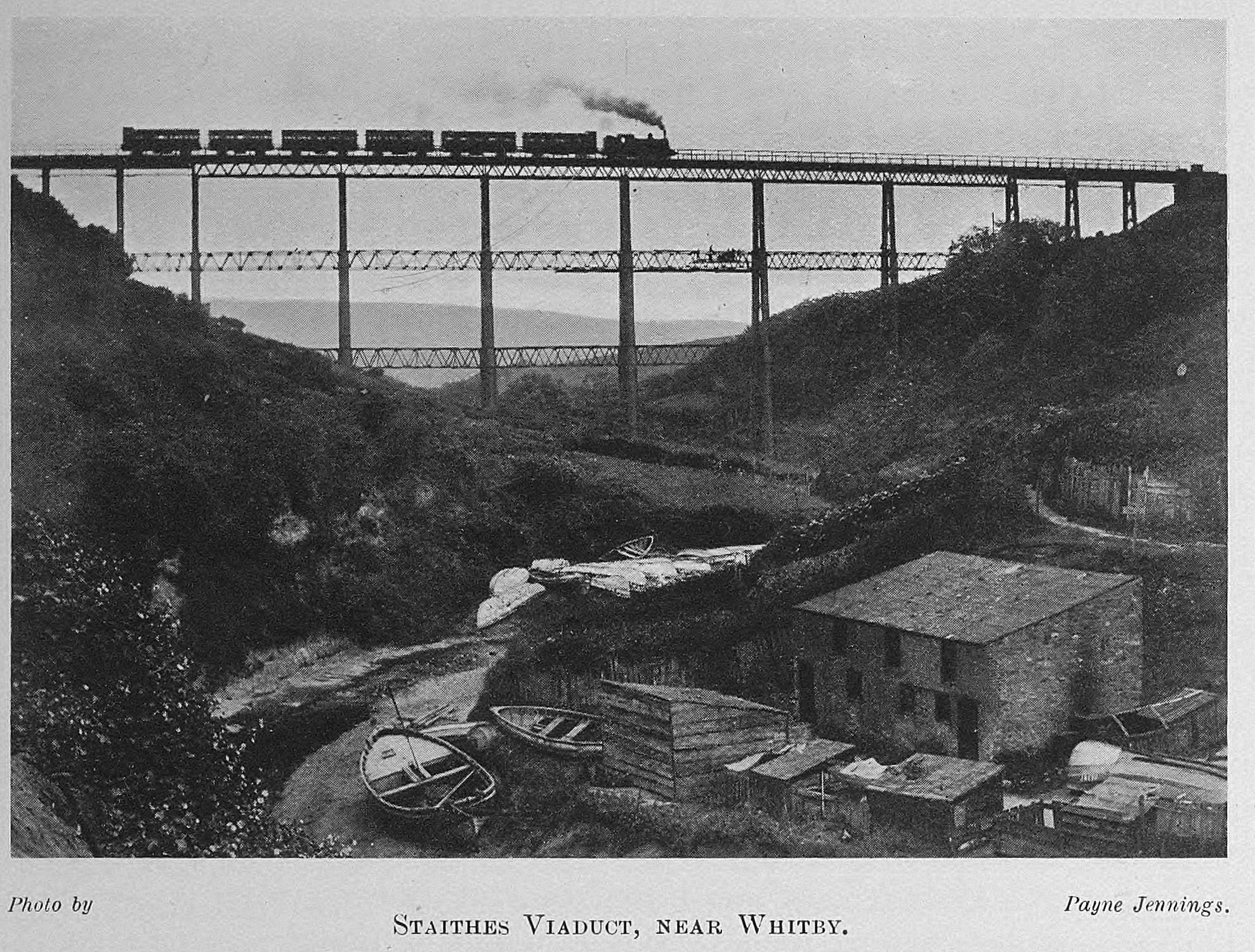
The Staithes Viaduct, circa 1915. It was demolished in 1960.

The station closed on to all traffic on 5 May 1958. The station building is now a private residence and is located next to the modern-day main car park for the village.

Immediately to the north west of the station the railway passed over Staithes Viaduct, built in 1875 but not opened to railway traffic until 1883 along with the rest of the railway. The viaduct was built of iron and concrete and was 152 feet (46 m) high and 790 feet (240 m) in length. Due to the strong winds in the area, trains could only cross at 20 miles per hour (32 km/h) in windy conditions, and the viaduct was closed completely in high winds. Following closure of the line, the viaduct was demolished in 1960. A plaque near the site of the viaduct details the history of both the structure and the railway.

== Services ==
In 1896, the normal daily pattern was six trains each way. Four of the southbound trains continued past Whitby and onto Scarborough, with the other two terminating at Whitby Town. All northbound trains went to Saltburn. This general pattern of services continued through the following years, though some alterations occurred at Whitby, with most trains going south to Scarborough and connecting with a shuttle at Whitby West Cliff. During the Second World War the service was reduced to four services each way, with only two originating or terminating at Scarborough, and there were no services on Sundays.

After the Second World War, some expresses went through the station without stopping. However, the 1946 timetable shows an increase to eight daily services with two on Sundays. By the early 1950s, at least one southbound express called at Staithes, with 14 daily workings. Expresses took 2 hours 27 minutes for the 58 miles (93 km) journey between Middlesbrough and Scarborough; the stopping trains took over three hours.

Preceding station	Disused railways	Following station
Grinkle; Line and station closed	North Eastern Railway; WR&MU	Hinderwell; Line and station closed
