= Boosbeck railway station =

Disused railway station in North Yorkshire, England

Boosbeck
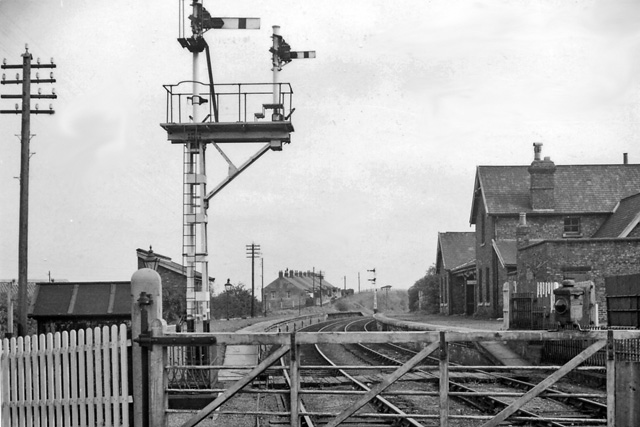
- Boosbeck railway station in April 1961 looking east

General information
- Location: Boosbeck, Redcar and Cleveland; England
- Coordinates: 54.5451°N 0.9823°W
- Grid reference: NZ659171
- Platforms: 2

Other information
- Status: Disused

History
- Original company: Cleveland Railway
- Pre-grouping: North Eastern Railway
- Post-grouping: London and North Eastern Railway

Key dates
- 1 November 1878: Station opened
- 2 May 1960: Station closed to passengers
- 12 September 1964: Station closed completely
Location

Boosbeck railway station was a railway station serving the village of Boosbeck in the ceremonial county of the North Riding of Yorkshire (now Redcar and Cleveland) in England. The station was opened in 1878 and closed to passengers in 1960 with freight services being stopped in 1964.

The station was opened by the Cleveland Railway, which was absorbed by the North Eastern Railway (NER) in 1865. At the grouping, services were provided by the London and North Eastern Railway (LNER).

== History ==
The Cleveland Railway opened up a line eastwards from Guisborough in 1862 which reached Boosbeck in that year and made it to Brotton in 1865 and Skinningrove in 1866. This provided a connection with the Whitby, Redcar and Middlesbrough Union Railway (W&RMU) in 1875 when they built their line through Loftus. The line through Boosbeck, which was opposed vehemently by the Stockton & Darlington Railway, was originally intended to be a way of moving iron ore from the various mines in the Cleveland Hills. As such, the stations along the line did not open until some time later as passengers were not an immediate concern. Even when stations were opened in 1875 at most of the locations on the line, Boosbeck did not open until three years later in 1878.

A station was first proposed at a cost of £2,100 in April 1874, when other stations on the line were also proposed (Brotton, Skinningrove and Loftus) which were built and opened in 1875. The design of the station was down to the architect William Peachey, who was working for the North Eastern Railway. The plans were shelved for two years, being revived in June 1876, though with the costs revised by a 33% cut in expenditure.

Passenger services at the station ran from Middlesbrough to Brotton, via the line at Nunthorpe and a reversal at Guisborough. In 1938, thirteen out and back workings were listed in timetables as stopping in the station, with eight out and back services on Sundays. In NER days, the service pattern on the line was Middlesbrough-Guisborough-Saltburn. In 1933, the LNER made a change to the train services, which saw most Scarborough to Middlesbrough trains diverted over the line as opposed to the previous route direct past Saltburn. However, not all of these services called at Boosbeck, but rules were relaxed to let the services reverse into, and out of, Guisborough. The service pattern was changed again in 1958, when the line from Loftus to Whitby was closed due to corrosion in the iron viaducts on the line.

The station had two platforms, a 5-tonne (5.5-ton) crane and was capable of handling goods and livestock. The station was closed to passengers in May 1960, after which, it became an unstaffed public delivery siding. It was served by a circular freight train from Newport Yard in Middlesbrough that ran eastwards through the station. The west facing line was not in regular use as the return trip went via Saltburn.

The station was closed to goods traffic in September 1964. The line west of the station was closed in 1963, and closure of the line eastwards towards Brotton came at the same time as the closure to goods in 1964.

The stationmasters house has survived in private ownership.

Preceding station	Disused railways	Following station
Guisborough	Cleveland Railway	North Skelton (northbound)
Guisborough	Cleveland Railway	Brotton (eastbound)
