= Hinderwell railway station =

Former railway station in the North Riding of Yorkshire, England

Hinderwell
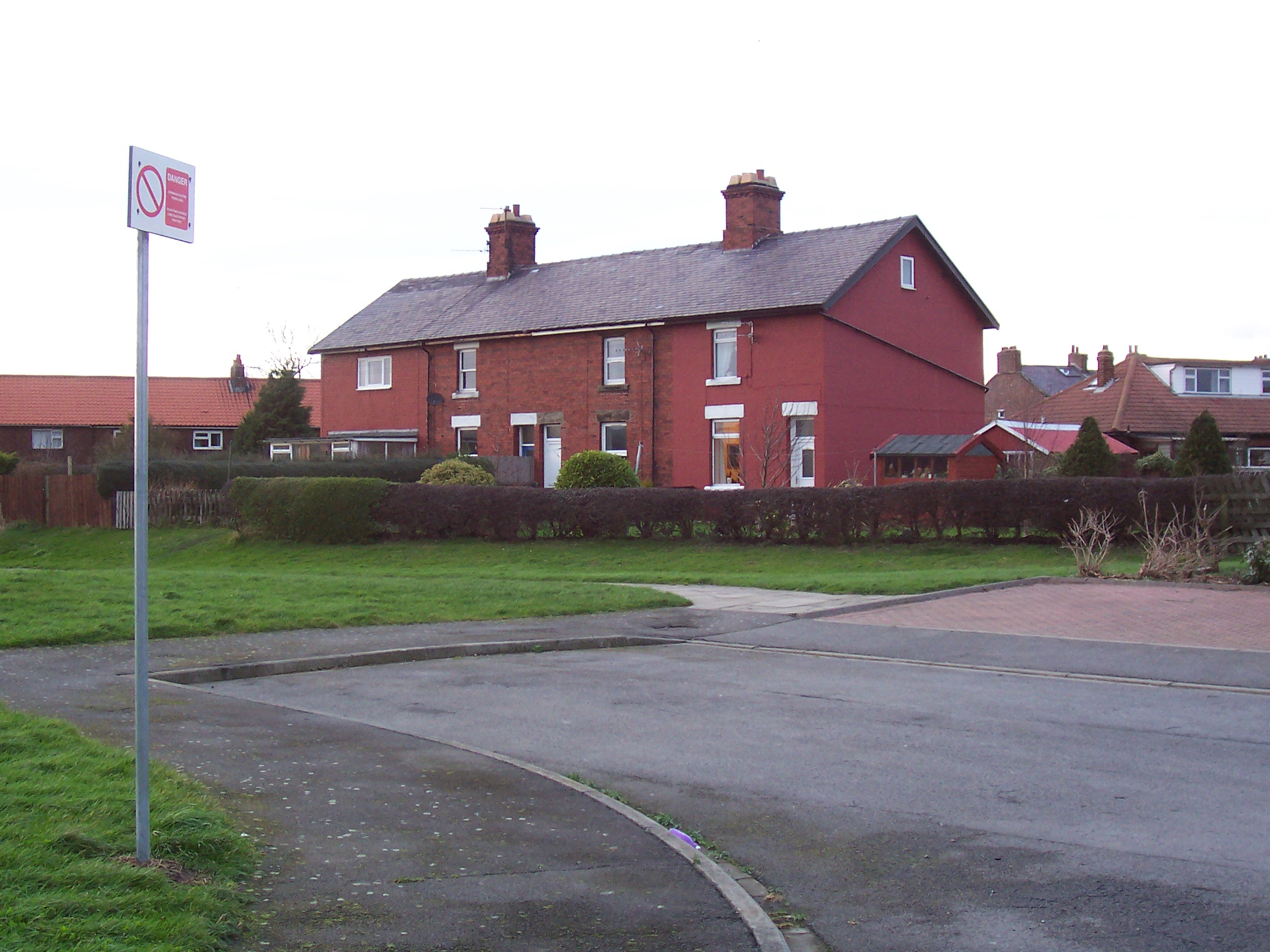
- Railway cottages, Hinderwell, February 2008. Note the newer brick additions on either side.

General information
- Location: Hinderwell, North Yorkshire; England
- Coordinates: 54.535300°N 0.772000°W
- Grid reference: NZ795162
- Platforms: 2

Other information
- Status: Disused

History
- Original company: Whitby Redcar and Middlesbrough Union Railway
- Pre-grouping: North Eastern Railway
- Post-grouping: London and North Eastern Railway

Key dates
- 3 December 1883: Opened
- 5 May 1958: Closed
Location

Hinderwell railway station was a railway station on the Whitby Redcar and Middlesbrough Union Railway. It was opened on 3 December 1883, and served the villages of Hinderwell and Runswick Bay. Like most stations on the line between Loftus and Whitby West Cliff, it was built with a passing loop. However, the northbound side was not furnished with a platform until 1908. The station closed to all traffic on 5 May 1958.

The station buildings have all been demolished, and small industrial units occupy the site. However, the former railway cottages are still (February 2008) extant, albeit modernised and extended.

Preceding station	Disused railways	Following station
Staithes; Line and station closed	North Eastern Railway; WR&MU	Kettleness; Line and station closed
