= Yorkshire Coast Line (disambiguation) =

The Yorkshire Coast Line is a modern term for the Hull to Scarborough railway line.

Yorkshire Coast Line can also refer to:

- The coastline of Yorkshire
  - For East Riding of Yorkshire see Holderness and Humber Estuary, also Flamborough Head and Spurn
  - For North Yorkshire see North York Moors, also River Tees
- For coastal railway lines in North Yorkshire see
  - Scarborough and Whitby Railway
  - Whitby, Redcar and Middlesbrough Union Railway
- For lines to the coast in the East Riding of Yorkshire see
  - Hull and Holderness Railway
  - Hull and Hornsea Railway
