= Boosbeck =

Village in North Yorkshire, England

Coordinates: 54.54225°N 0.98072°W

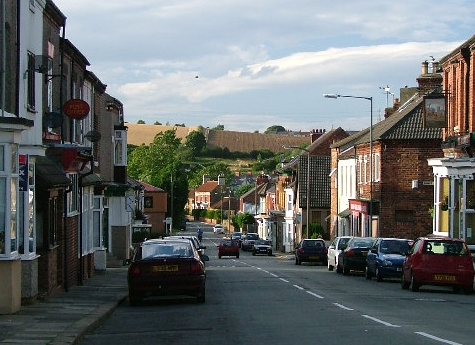
- Boosbeck

- Location within North Yorkshire
- OS grid reference: NZ660168
- Civil parish: Lockwood
- Unitary authority: Redcar and Cleveland
- Ceremonial county: North Yorkshire
- Region: North East
- Country: England
- Sovereign state: United Kingdom
- Police: Cleveland
- Fire: Cleveland
- Ambulance: North East

Boosbeck is a village in the borough of Redcar and Cleveland and the ceremonial county of North Yorkshire, England.

The name is Viking in origin and means "the stream near a cow shed".

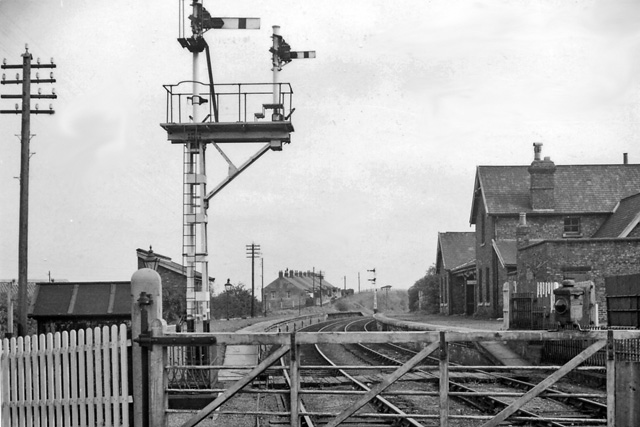
Boosbeck's former railway station in 1961

Between 1878 and 1960, the village had a station on the North Eastern Railway line between Brotton and Guisborough. It was closed to passengers in 1960 but continued to be used for freight until 1964.

Lockwood Primary School is located on the southern edge of the village. It was opened in 1984, replacing an earlier 1881 school on the same road. The former school has since been home to Castle Court Nursing Home and currently Morgan House, a Specialist Veterans Hub.

Boosbeck is home to one public house, the Top House formerly known as the Commercial Hotel, and Boosbeck Hotel. A second public house, the Station Hotel closed in 2023.
