= Grinkle railway station =

Former railway station in the North Riding of Yorkshire, England

Grinkle

General information
- Location: Easington, Redcar and Cleveland; England
- Coordinates: 54.551078°N 0.861616°W
- Grid reference: NZ737179
- Platforms: 2

Other information
- Status: Disused

History
- Original company: Whitby, Redcar and Middlesbrough Union Railway
- Pre-grouping: North Eastern Railway
- Post-grouping: London and North Eastern Railway

Key dates
- 3 December 1883: Opened as Easington
- 1 April 1904: Renamed Grinkle
- 11 September 1939: Closed
Location

Grinkle railway station was on the Whitby Redcar and Middlesbrough Union Railway. It was opened on 3 December 1883, and served the village of Easington in North Yorkshire, England. It was originally named Easington, but was renamed Grinkle on 1 April 1904 after the nearby baronial mansion of Grinkle Park, to avoid confusion with Easington station on the North Eastern Railway's Durham Coast Line.

The station originally had only one platform, a second being added around 1906 to increase the passenger capacity of the line. A small goods yard with one siding was situated west of the station, serving a coal depot. There was a brick-built station building along with a signal box.

The station closed on 11 September 1939, but was used as a passing loop afterwards. Though the line is closed to passengers, the track remains to service the nearby Boulby Potash Mine. However the track layout has been changed and the station has been completely dismantled.

Preceding station	Disused railways	Following station
Loftus; Line open, station closed	North Eastern Railway; WR&MU	Staithes; Line and station closed
