= Hunt Cliff =

Cliff in North Yorkshire, England

Hunt Cliff Huntcliff
- Cliff; Promontory
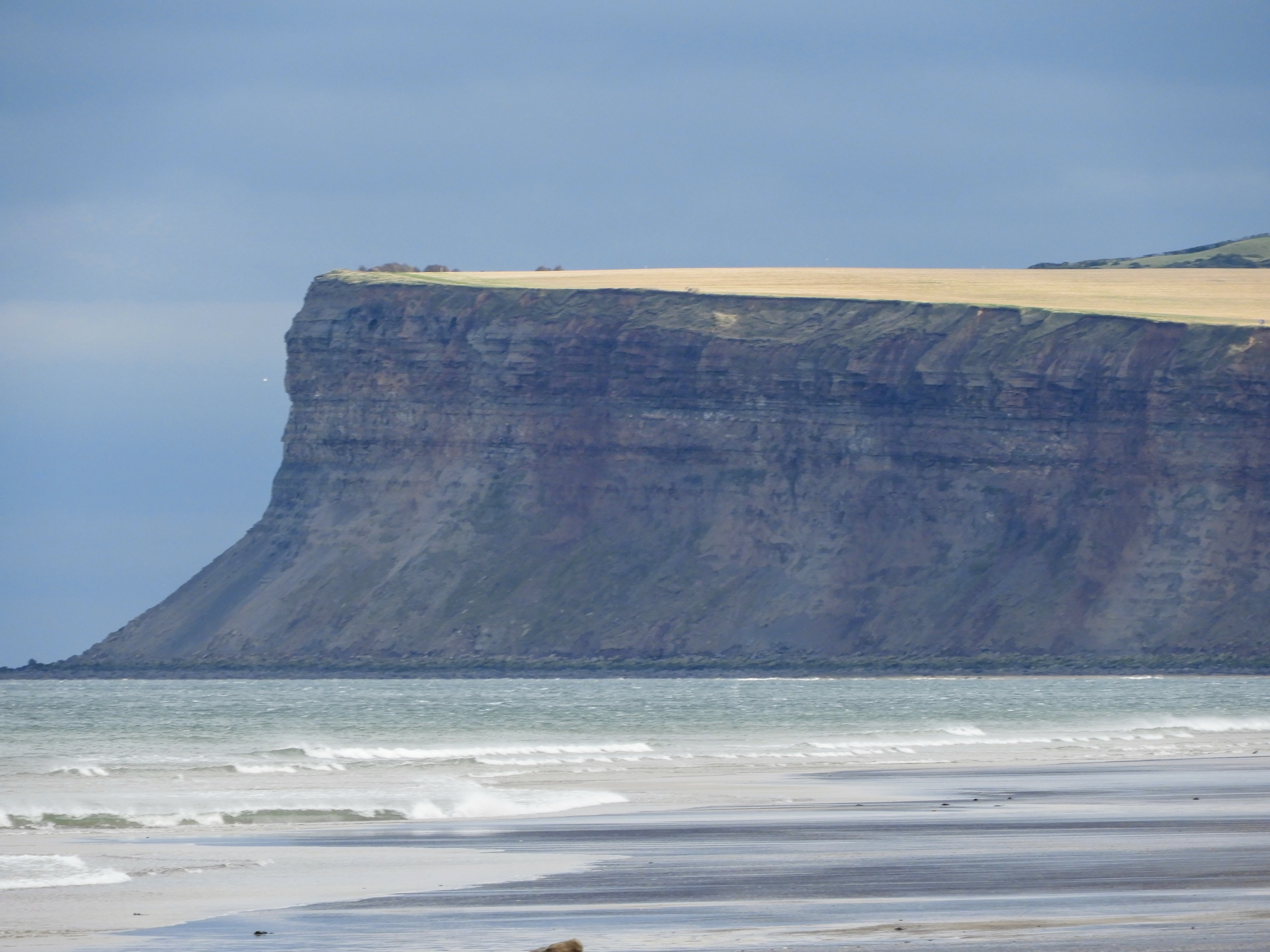
- Hunt Cliff viewed from Saltburn

- Location within North Yorkshire
- Coordinates: 54.584°N 0.920°W
- Grid position: NZ698215
- Location: Saltburn, North Yorkshire, England
- Part of: Yorkshire Coast
- Water bodies: North Sea
- Elevation: 365 feet (111 m)
- Highest elevation: 550 feet (170 m) (Warsett Hill)
- Topo map: OS Explorer OL26

Hunt Cliff (sometimes Huntcliff or Huntcliffe) is a sea cliff or promontory, located between Saltburn and Skinningrove, in Redcar and Cleveland, on the Yorkshire Coast in England. Whilst Hunt Cliff is not as high as the nearby cliffs at Boulby, the view of it from Saltburn has been described as "very striking". Historically, the cliff has had many uses, being a signal station for the Romans, a place to mine ironstone, and a radar station during the Second World War. The Cleveland Way long-distance path traverses the cliff edge.

It is the find spot of the Huntcliff Figure, a likely prehistoric statue that supposedly fell out of the cliff in the 19th century.

== Description ==
Hunt Cliff rises some 365 feet (111 m) above the North Sea on the Yorkshire coast, and is 1.5 miles (2.4 km) east of the town of Saltburn. Warsett Hill, the highest point of the coast here, is set back southwards from the cliff edge by 0.5-mile (0.8 km), and rises to 550 feet (170 m).

The first indication of human settlement dates back to around 1300 BC, with the inhabitants most likely being farmers. The top of the cliff is the site of a Roman signal station, located between the cliff edge and Warsett Hill (549 feet (167 m)) to the south. An archaeological investigation in 1911 discovered 14 skeletons, all of whom bore evidence of being knocked on the head. The location of the old Roman fort was on the edge of the cliff, most of the remains of the site have toppled into the sea, and it is thought to have been established in 350 AD. Coins found at the site had been minted sometime between 370 and 400 AD.

The Cleveland Way traverses the cliff edge (now also part of the England Coast Path), and is also host to a railway line that used to carry passengers between Saltburn/Middlesbrough and Whitby, but which is now kept open to move freight to and from the steelworks at Skinningrove, and the potash mine at Boulby. When the line was built in the second half of the 19th century, rather than cutting direct between Brotton and Carlin How, the line loops northwards and around Huntcliff, being at the cliff edge, almost within 30 feet (9.1 m) of it.

The view of the cliff from Saltburn looking eastwards, has been described as being "very striking", and the promontory of Hunt Cliff forms the southern edge of Tees Bay, and the start of the cliff section of coastline south towards Flamborough. Huntcliff Foot, at the base of the cliff where it meets the sea, just 7.9 inches (0.2 m) above sea level, was the ancient boundary point westwards for the Port of Whitby. The ports' authority extended between Scarborough in the south, and Huntcliff in the west and north. From Huntcliff Foot westwards towards the Tees, the coast is quite sandy, and on the east, is very rocky.

The geology of Hunt Cliff is largely that of alum shales from the Middle Lias, with a 20-foot (6.1 m) deep layer of boulder clay on the surface. However, a significant band of ironstone through the rock strata led to mining being carried out on the clifftop at two sites; Cliff Mine (NZ689216) and Huntcliff Mine (NZ697214). Cliff Mine operated between 1857 and 1887, though initially, the ironstone was quarried as it outcrops at the surface. Before the arrival of the railway (in 1865), quarried or mined ironstone was simply shoved over the cliff edge and shipped away by boat. Huntcliff Mine was in operation between 1872 and 1906, and as part of its legacy, the Guibal Fanhouse, a hilltop structure that pumped fresh air into the mine, is still standing by the railway and is now a scheduled monument. The fanhouse at Hunt Cliff is one of fifteen built in Cleveland, and although there are two other examples, the one at Hunt Cliff retains many of its original fixtures and fittings, making it unique nationally. Cliff Mine worked 85,545 tonnes (94,297 tons) in 1873 and was worth £25,664 (equivalent to £2,413,000 in 2025); Huntcliff mine worked 173,220 tonnes (190,940 tons) in the same year, and was worth £55,327 (equivalent to £5,193,000 in 2025). Ironstone extraction has led to subsidence at the north end of Warsett Hill.

Hunt Cliff was used in both World Wars, being a location for an anti-aircraft gun in the First World War, and a radar station and army camp in the Second World War. The 6 inches (150 mm) naval gun was placed on Hunt Cliff to prevent Zeppelin attacks on the Teesside industries. It was mounted upon a special railway carriage and ran on tracks that had a spur off the main railway line, and built on embankments with ironstone waste from the nearby Lumpsey Mine. In the Second World War, a site at NZ686218 was used as a Coastal Defence/Chain Home Low (CD/CHL) radar location.

In 1991, 153 acres (62 ha) of land at the edge of Warsett Hill overlooking the sea, was purchased by the National Trust, including the Guibal Fanhouse, and the area is within the North Yorkshire and Cleveland Heritage Coastline. Some of the highest cliffs on the East Coast of England are in the section between Saltburn and Flamborough; whilst Boulby Cliffs are recognised as the highest at 660 feet (200 m), Hunt Cliff is still quite tall at 365 feet (111 m).

=== Wildlife ===
Kittiwakes, fulmars, cormorants and house martins are known to nest on the cliff. Sightings of grey seals, harbour porpoise and minke whales have also been noted here. The site is also part of the Hunt Cliff nature reserve maintained by the Tees Valley Wildlife Trust. The nature reserve covers 29 acres (12 ha) and is accessed by the Cleveland Way. Noted flora include the pyramidal orchid, dyer's greenweed, sea plantain, wild carrot and spiny restharrow.
