= Cleveland Railway (England) =

Early English railway company

The Cleveland Railway was a railway line in north-east England running from Normanby Jetty on the River Tees, near Middlesbrough, via Normanby and then via Guisborough through the Eston Hills, to Loftus in East Cleveland. It carried minerals from numerous iron ore mines along its route to the River Tees for shipment to Tyneside and elsewhere. The line was jointly proposed by the West Hartlepool Harbour and Railway (WHH&R), who provided half its capital, together with various landowners. The WHH&R lay on the north bank of the Tees, to which it had a cross-river connection via a jetty at Normanby.

The Cleveland Railway was built as a freight railway and provided no passenger services during its brief existence as an independently owned railway. It was built in a number of stages, bypassing the centre of Guisborough, and opened in November 1861. Its construction was repeatedly held up by disputes with its main rival, the Stockton and Darlington Railway, which attempted unsuccessfully to use all means at its disposal to maintain its rail monopoly south of the Tees. However, the Cleveland Railway remained independent only until 1865, when the company and its rivals were bought out by the North Eastern Railway (NER).

The new management linked the line with an existing coastal railway via Saltburn, running north of the Eston Hills, and closed the line west of Guisborough in 1873 after only twelve years of service, though part of the line continued in service until 1966 as a freight route for a brickworks and carried passengers to Eston between 1902 and 1929. The NER constructed four passenger stations at the eastern end of the line in the 1870s. These were closed between 1958 and 1964 along with the section of the line from Guisborough to Brotton, but the easternmost part of the line is still in use today as a mineral railway.

== History ==
=== Origins of the line ===
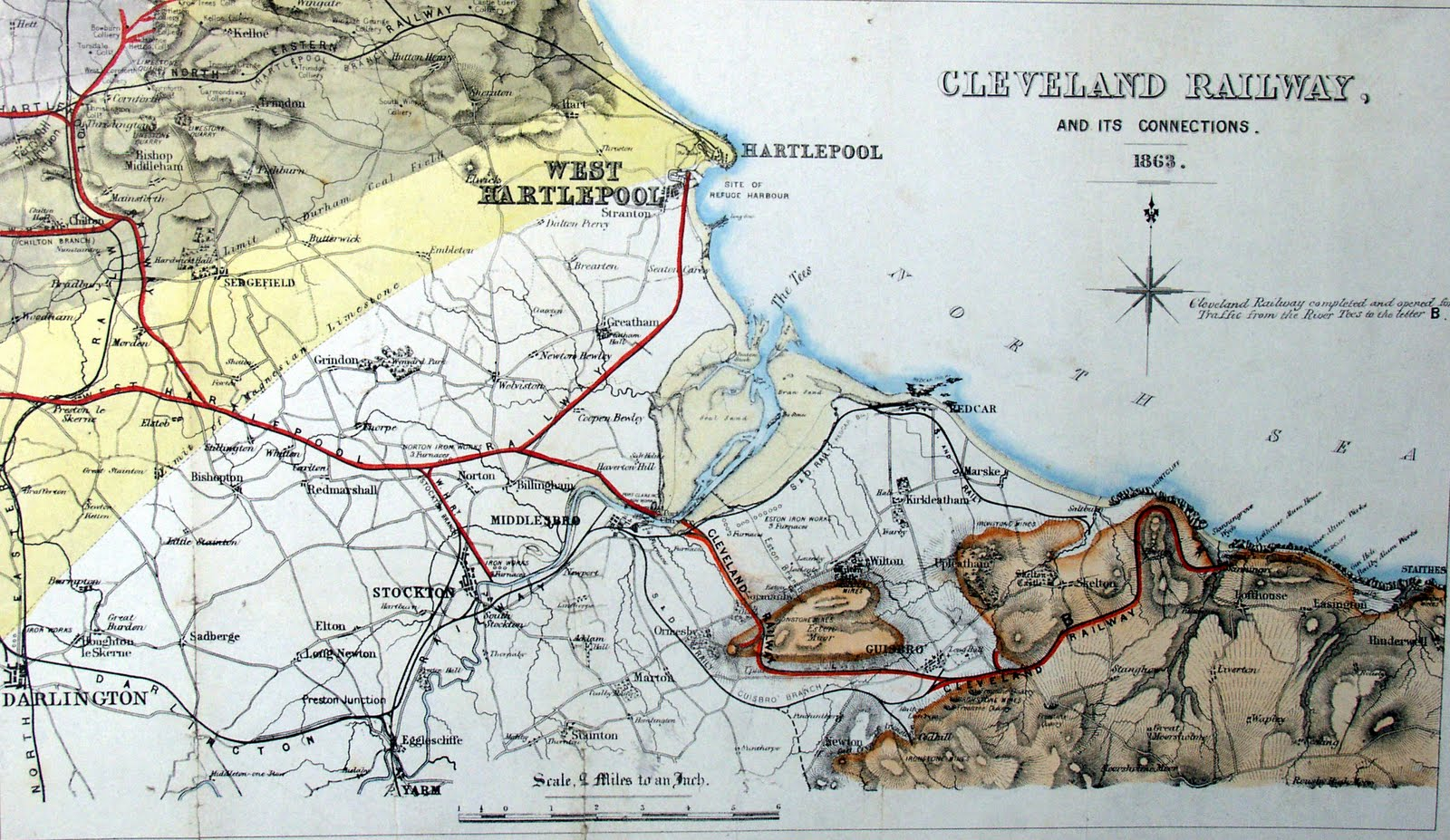
Map of the Cleveland Railway and its connections, 1863. The West Hartlepool Harbour and Railway ran north of the Tees, with a river connection to the Cleveland Railway south of the river.

The construction of the line was prompted by the need of mine owners around Guisborough and East Cleveland to transport their iron ore to the River Tees. Guisborough was already served by the Middlesbrough and Guisborough Railway (M&GR), a subsidiary of the Stockton and Darlington Railway (S&DR), which had built a line (opened in 1854) running along the south of the valley in which Guisborough sits. However, the line was an inconveniently long distance from the lucrative iron ore mines in the north of the valley, along the south flank of the Eston Hills, and provided no connection at all for mines east of Guisborough. The M&GR had been built by a group of industrialists based in Stockton and Darlington who used it to service their own mines, deliberately avoiding the estates of their rivals. It only provided a minimal passenger service to Middlesbrough – one train a day each way – and the line had originally not even been planned to have a passenger station in Guisborough.

The M&GR was unpopular with local people and mine owners who saw it as a would-be monopolist that served narrow commercial interests rather than the wider public good. During parliamentary discussions into the Cleveland Railway's proposed route, a select committee of the House of Commons was told that the M&GR was "unwilling to give facility for people carrying traffic not connected with the furnaces with which they are connected." The M&GR's attitude aroused strong local resentment. When one of those testifying to the select committee was asked what the local landowners would think of a new railway independent of the S&DR, he replied that "they would all jump at having such a proposal made to them."

The West Hartlepool Harbour and Railway (WHH&R) and a number of landowners struck an agreement to construct a line from the Tees at Cargo Fleet via Normanby, Upsall and Guisborough to Skinningrove, with connecting links and branches to Staithes and Skelton-in-Cleveland. The line would connect to the WHH&R's own route north of the river via a crossing of the Tees. Several local landowners through which the proposed line ran were key to the scheme – Captain Thomas Chaloner of Guisborough, J.T. Wharton of Skelton Castle, Anthony Lax Maynard of Skinningrove and Ralph Ward Jackson of Greatham Hall, Normanby. Ward Jackson, who was the chairman of the WHH&R, was the driving force behind the project and envisaged making West Hartlepool into the industrial heart of Teesside.

Cleveland Railway Act 1858
- Act of Parliament
- Parliament of the United Kingdom
- Long title: An Act for making a Railway from or near Guisbrough to or near to Skinningrove, all in Cleveland in the North Riding of the County of York; and for other Purposes.
- Citation: 21 & 22 Vict. c. cxiv

Dates
- Royal assent: 23 July 1858

The construction of the line was strongly opposed by the S&DR, which put forward a rival proposal that led to a parliamentary enquiry. The two companies each had part of their schemes accepted and part rejected. The Ward Jackson group was allowed to build a railway east from Guisborough to Skinningrove with a branch at Slapewath to reach the mine at Skelton. They were not permitted to build their own separate line to Middlesbrough and had to rely instead on the M&GR for their connection to the Tees. The S&DR was allowed to build an extension from Redcar to Saltburn but was not allowed to build a new bridge across the Tees. An act of Parliament, the Cleveland Railway Act 1858 (21 & 22 Vict. c. cxiv) permitting the construction of the railway was passed in July 1858. The company was capitalised with £120,000, half of which came from the WHH&R, with Ward Jackson as its first chairman.

=== Extension of the line to Normanby ===
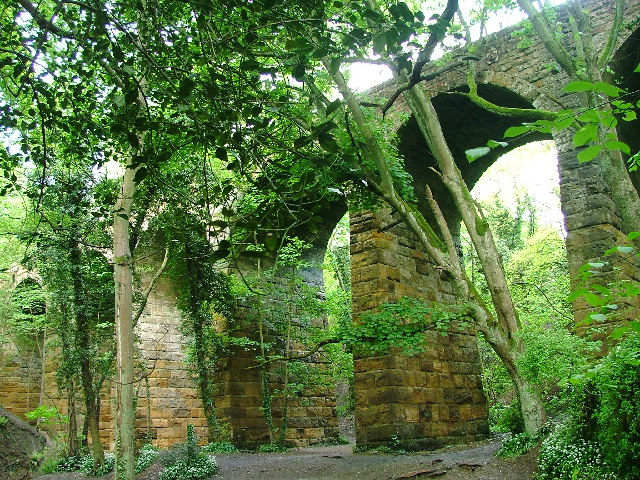
Waterfall Viaduct at Slapewath – a surviving remnant of the Cleveland Railway's route between Brotton and Guisborough

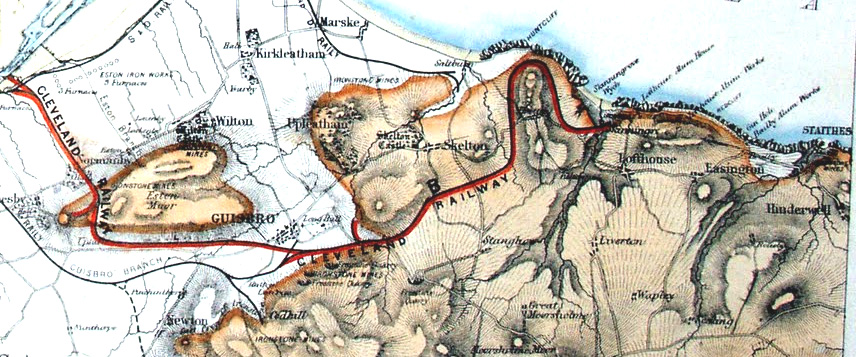
The route of the Cleveland Railway, as initially built

Ward Jackson continued to seek independence from the M&GR and put forward a fresh proposal in 1859 to extend the line from Guisborough to the Tees at Cargo Fleet, so that the increasing demand for iron ore shipments to Tyneside could more easily be met. The S&DR again opposed it. Although the House of Commons unanimously approved the Cleveland Extension Bill, it was rejected by the House of Lords. However, this left the door open for a private railway on the lands owned by Ward Jackson and his supporters. They began to construct it in 1860 under the auspices of the Upsall, Normanby and Ormesby Railway. Once again, the S&DR opposed it, this time on the grounds that the new line had to cross the S&DR's Redcar branch line, but it eventually gave permission for the construction of a bridge to cross its line.

A more serious problem was raised by the need to construct a new river crossing at the end of the line in Normanby. The WHH&R had sought to build a bridge across the Tees at that point but had been blocked by the Tees Conservancy Commission, at the prompting of the S&DR. The WHH&R instead resolved to build a jetty that would enable loaded iron ore wagons to be transported across the river on barges. The S&DR used its influence with the commissioners to stop the jetty as well. They undertook legal action in the Court of Chancery to stop it but construction proceeded regardless. The dispute led to violent clashes between the two sides on 10 September 1860 in an event dubbed the "Battle of the Tees", when Tees Conservancy barges sent to blockade the jetty were forcibly removed by West Hartlepool steam tugs. The police had to intervene to restore order. The WHH&R was the clear winner of the confrontation and was able to complete its jetty.

Cleveland Railway Act 1861
- Act of Parliament
- Parliament of the United Kingdom
- Long title: An Act to enable the Cleveland Railway Company to extend their Railway from Guisbrough to the River Tees, with Branches connected with that Extension, and to make certain Deviations in the authorized Line of their Railway; to confer certain Powers with reference to other Undertakings; to amend the Act relating to the Cleveland Railway; and for other Purposes.
- Citation: 24 & 25 Vict. c. clxxxiii

Dates
- Royal assent: 22 July 1861

The line was substantially completed by the spring of 1861. It consisted of two linked private railways running through the estates of Ward Jackson and Captain Chaloner of Guisborough. A bridge was constructed in March 1861 to carry Chaloner's section of the line over the M&GR just outside Guisborough station, bypassing the town to connect with the Cleveland Railway's existing eastbound line to Skinningrove. A fresh act of Parliament, the Cleveland Railway Act 1861 (24 & 25 Vict. c. clxxxiii), was passed in July 1861 to authorise the Cleveland Railway Company to operate the new line. Although the S&DR was still vehemently opposed, Parliament had by now tired of the disputes between the companies and passed the act over the objections of the S&DR.

The line was opened on 23 November 1861, with a total length of 13 miles (21 km) running from Skelton Mine to Normanby Jetty. Crossing the gorge at Slapewath on the eight-arched Waterfall Viaduct, which still stands today, it skirted the south-west of Guisborough and crossed Chapel Beck on wooden viaducts. From there it ran on a nearly straight embankment across the fields west of Guisborough before curving northwards to Normanby through a gap in the Eston Hills. Branch lines and tramways connected the line to a number of mines along its route. It had no passenger stations and did not offer any passenger services, despite the poor connections from Guisborough that had caused so much discontent with the M&GR.

=== Mergers, onward connections and closures ===
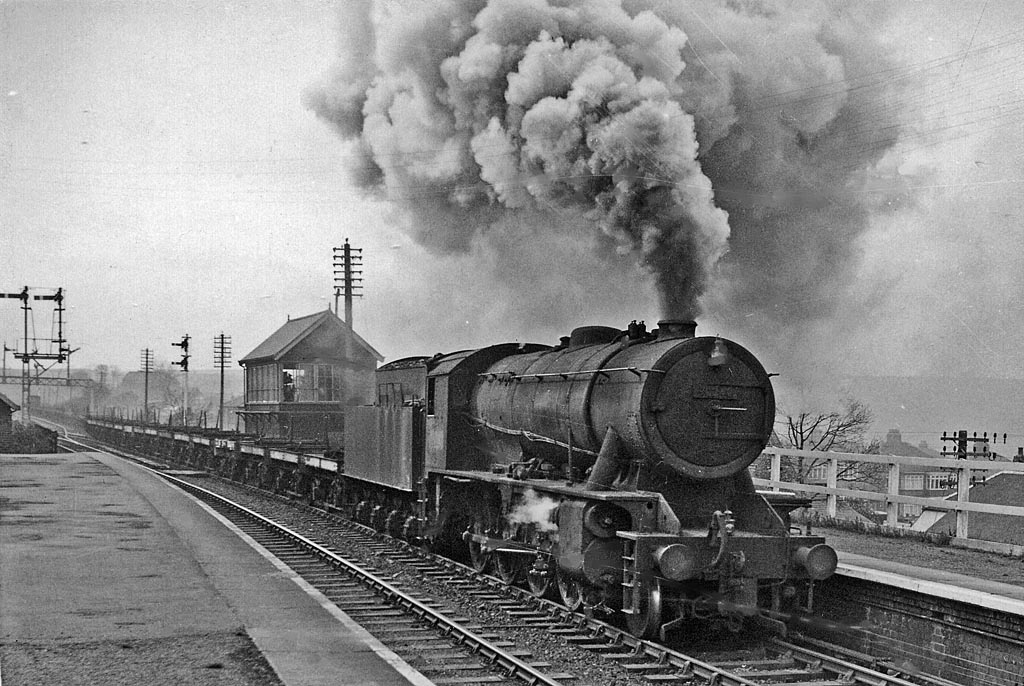
Steam train on the Cleveland Railway at Brotton, April 1961

Financial irregularities at the WHH&R led in 1862 to the company suffering severe financial difficulties, resulting in the resignation of Ward Jackson from the boards of the WHH&R and the Cleveland Railway. Parliament refused to authorise further contributions from the WHH&R to the Cleveland Railway. Nonetheless, funds were raised to construct new extensions via Boosbeck and Loftus.

The Cleveland Railway, the M&GR and the S&DR were all taken over in 1865 by the North Eastern Railway (NER), in the case of the Cleveland Railway by the North Eastern, West Hartlepool and Cleveland Railways Amalgamation Act 1865 (28 & 29 Vict. c. ccclxviii). The new management authorised the construction of a link from Saltburn (which the S&DR had reached in 1861) via Skelton to the Cleveland Railway's route at Brotton, forking south to reach Guisborough. This connection, completed in 1872, provided a new connection between Teesside and the East Cleveland mines, running north of the Eston Hills. Further capacity was provided by doubling the tracks on the line running east of Guisborough. This made the former Cleveland Railway's line west of Guisborough redundant and it was closed in 1873 after only twelve years of service, though the parallel M&GR line to Middlesbrough remained open for a further 90 years.

Although the old Cleveland Railway had not provided any passenger services, during the 1870s the NER built a number of stations at the eastern end of the line. Passenger services began from Brotton, Skinningrove and Loftus in 1875, plus Boosbeck in 1878. The tortuous history of the Cleveland Railway had a lasting effect on the provision of rail services to Guisborough. It did not at any time offer a passenger service to the town, leaving that instead to the M&GR, which provided only a single-platform station at the end of its line into the town. This line was bypassed by the Cleveland Railway en route to Skinningrove. After the westbound Cleveland Railway was closed, the eastbound line was joined with the M&GR line, leaving Guisborough railway station at the end of a spur. Trains thus had to reverse out of the station before continuing along the line to Loftus. It remained this way until the line was closed in 1964.

== Cleveland Railway today ==
The east end of the Cleveland Railway, from Loftus to Brotton plus the connection to the Tees Valley Line west of Saltburn, is still in use as a mineral railway serving Boulby Mine. There are no passenger services. The short connection from the Tees Valley Line to Normanby Jetty survived until 1966 as the Normanby Branch of the Tees Valley Line, serving the Normanby brickworks and Eston railway station. It is now a public footpath, the South Bank Walkway, which links Flatts Lane Country Park to South Bank. The middle section of the line from Normanby to Guisborough is in private ownership or has been built on, though the former railway's embankment can still be clearly seen running alongside the A171 Middlesbrough Road. The section from Guisborough to Slapewath has been converted into a public footpath, the Guisborough Branch Walkway.

== Gallery ==
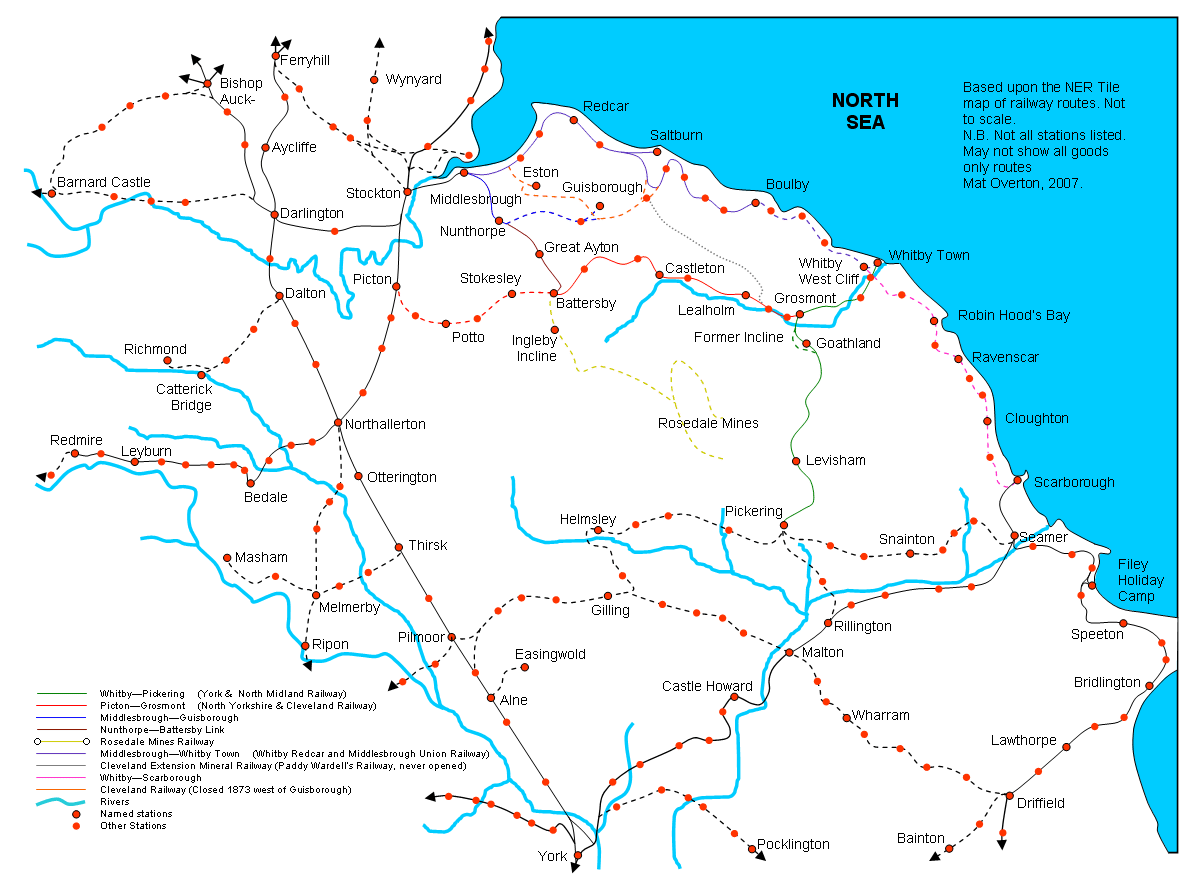
Map of route and surrounding railways

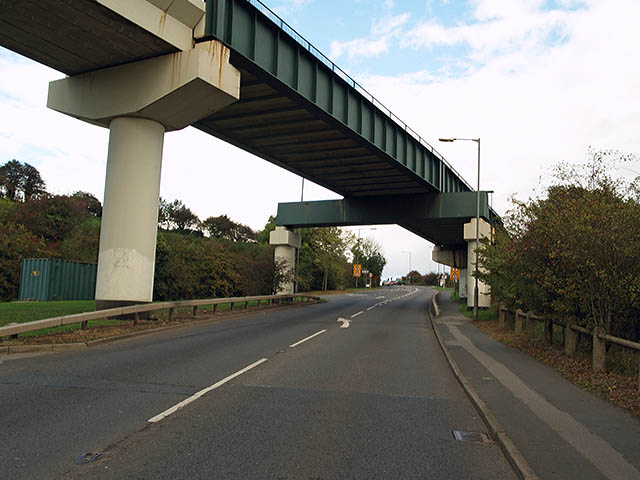
Viaduct over Skinningrove Beck near Skinningrove railway station.
