= Kettleness railway station =

Former railway station in the North Riding of Yorkshire, England

Kettleness
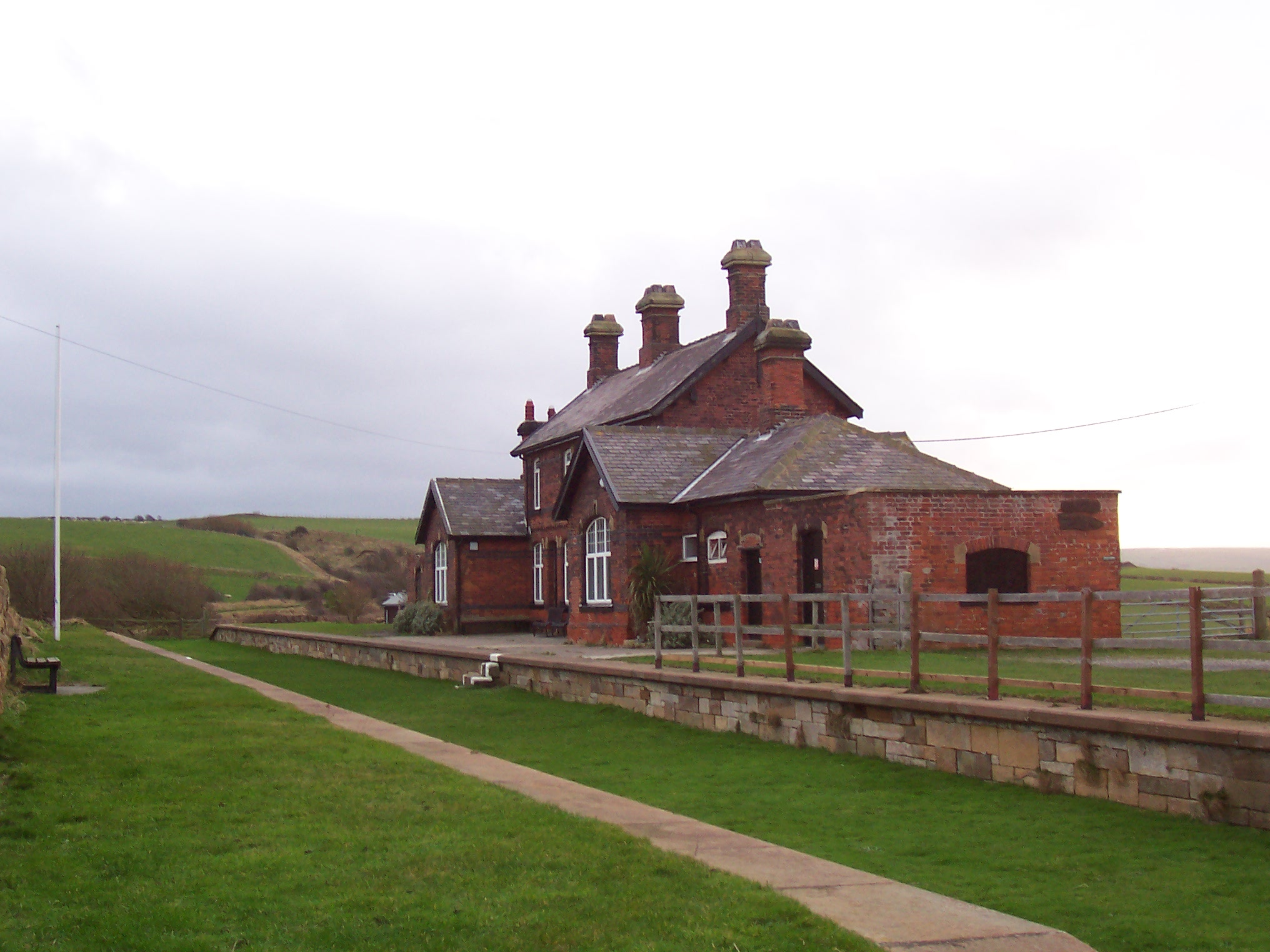
- Kettleness station, February 2008

General information
- Location: Kettleness, North Yorkshire; England
- Coordinates: 54.528300°N 0.716950°W
- Grid reference: NZ831155
- Platforms: 2

Other information
- Status: Disused

History
- Original company: Whitby, Redcar and Middlesbrough Union Railway
- Pre-grouping: North Eastern Railway
- Post-grouping: London and North Eastern Railway

Key dates
- 3 December 1883: Opened
- 5 May 1958: Closed
Location

Kettleness was a railway station on the Whitby, Redcar and Middlesbrough Union Railway from 1883 to 1958 serving the remote village of Kettleness. The main station building is still extant and serves as a scouting centre.

== History ==
The station opened on 3 December 1883, and was able to handle goods, parcels, livestock and horseboxes. The goods yard had a north facing connection, so that the coal drop was on the up (south side) of the line. Kettleness station goods yard forwarded loads of iron ore from nearby workings. In 1913, this amounted to 2,595 tonnes (2,860 tons) forwarded to the iron smelters on Teesside.

The main station building, which included the signal box on the platform, was on the north side of the station servicing the line towards Whitby. Like most of the stations on the largely single line, Kettleness had a passing loop.

In terms of passenger numbers, Kettleness was the quietest station on the line. An analysis of ticket sales shows that the station's busiest year was 1919, with over 8,000 tickets sold. By the end of the 1930s, and the start of the Second World War, tickets sales were dropping off. In 1938, 3,367 tickets were sold, in 1939, 2,839, and in 1940, only 2,032 tickets were sold. Hoole states that in 1911, the population of the nearby hamlet was 54, yet 6,574 tickets were issued, amounting to nearly 122 trains journeys for each resident. He attributes this to there being no other form of transport.

The station was host to a LNER camping coach in 1935, and to two coaches from 1936 to 1939. A coach was positioned here by the North Eastern Region of British Railways from 1954 to 1958. Kettleness was a remote station which was far from any amenities, defined as the remotest station on the Whitby to Loftus railway line. However, campers could order food and other goods through the stationmaster. The coach was withdrawn when the line and station closed to passengers and goods on 5 May 1958. The line through the station was closed in 1959.

The station building is now known as 'Seeonee Lair' and is run as an activity centre by East Cleveland Scout District. The track bed has been lifted and the station canopy removed, but the platforms remain.

== Services ==
The timetable from 1896 indicated six services in each direction, with four of the down trains (Whitby bound), continuing south to Scarborough via the Scarborough to Whitby line from Prospect Hill Junction. The six northbound trains all went to Saltburn. The timetable from 1906 shows the same number of services, however, five trains continued on to Scarborough. By 1910, the services were still six per day each way, however only three services went on to Scarborough (though connections could be made at Whitby West Cliff to Scarborough bound services). By 1920, services had dropped to five each way.

The July timetable of 1922 shows eight services, including two out and back workings from Whitby to Hinderwell. By 1938, the era of the camping coaches, services south amounted to eleven, and northbound had twelve services per day. Sunday services were seven workings in each direction. The 1946 timetable shows eight workings, some of which passed each other at Kettleness, and two Sunday workings; one from Whitby to Saltburn, one from Scarborough to Saltburn and vice versa. In 1952, services had been curtailed again, however, one express train from Middlesbrough to Scarborough called at Kettleness only to pass another northbound service on the single line.

Preceding station	Disused railways	Following station
Hinderwell; Line and station closed	North Eastern Railway; WR&MU	Sandsend; Line and station closed
