= Sandsend Tunnel =

Railway tunnel in North Yorkshire, England

Coordinates: 54°31′25″N 0°42′13″W

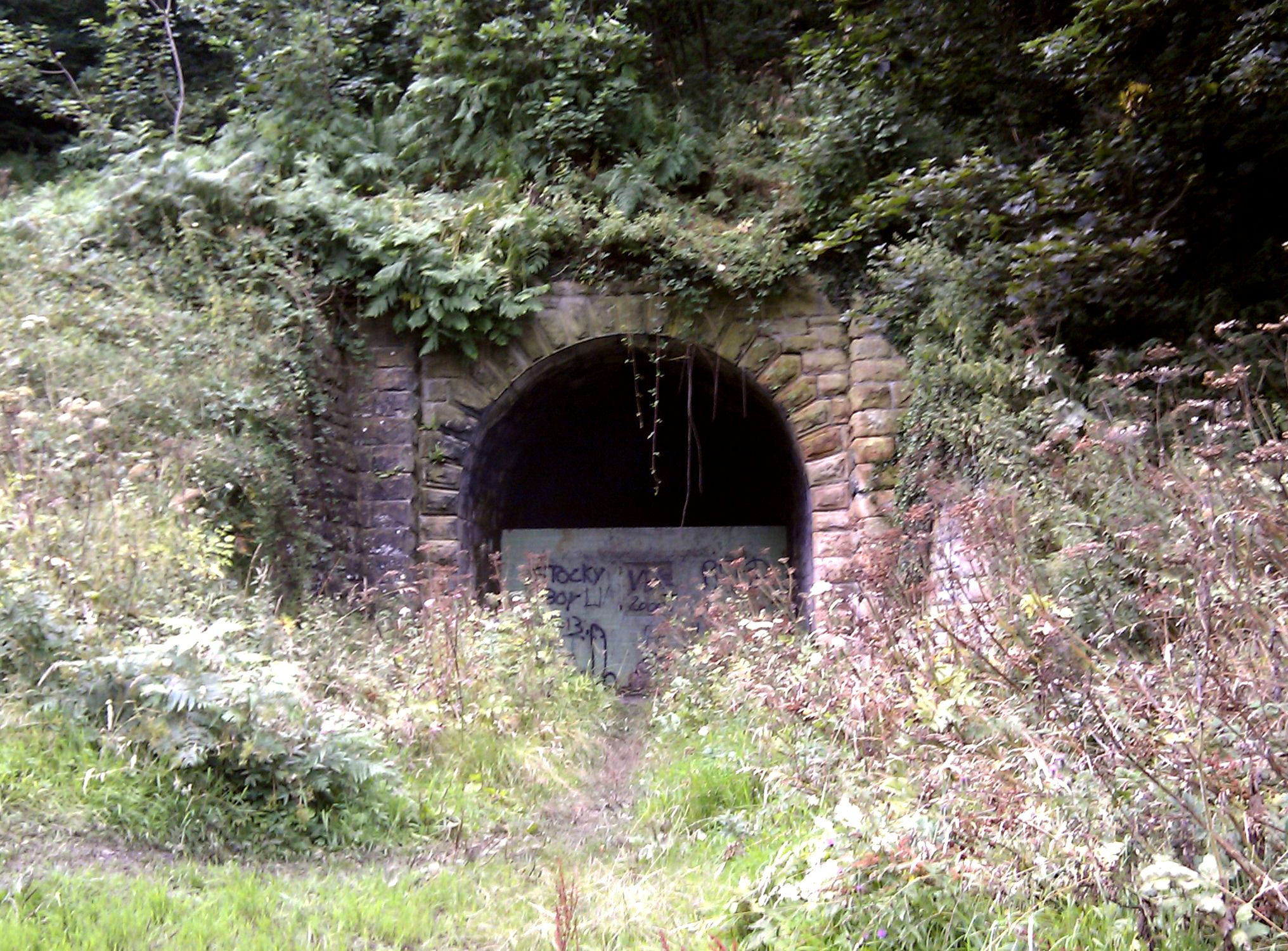
Sandsend Tunnel, south entrance

Sandsend Tunnel is a tunnel on the former Whitby, Redcar and Middlesbrough Union Railway that was opened in 1883 and closed in 1958. The rail line that ran through it was originally intended to travel along the top of the cliffs, however some of the cliff fell into the sea whilst construction was suspended so the NER constructed two tunnels, the Sandsend Tunnel and the Kettleness Tunnel.

The Sandsend Tunnel is the longer of two tunnels being 1,652 yards (0.94 miles) in length. It is predominantly straight but the north-western 300 yards incorporate a curve to the north.

There are a total of five air shafts, two of which have nearby service galleries leading off horizontally to the cliffs which were used to dump spoil while carving out the tunnels, the air shafts were capped in 1958. The southern half of the tunnel is considerably damp with the tunnel being flooded to about 6 inches on the southern 300 yards. The southern portal of the Sandsend Tunnel is bricked up and it can only be accessed via the northern portal of the Kettleness Tunnel by walking through the Kettleness Tunnel and the area between the tunnels which is overgrown with grass and trees. The northern portal of the Sandsend Tunnel partially collapsed in 2008 after years of pressure from the cliff above.
