= Huntcliff Figure =

One of Britain's largest Celtic carvings of a human. Archaeology.

The Huntcliff Figure
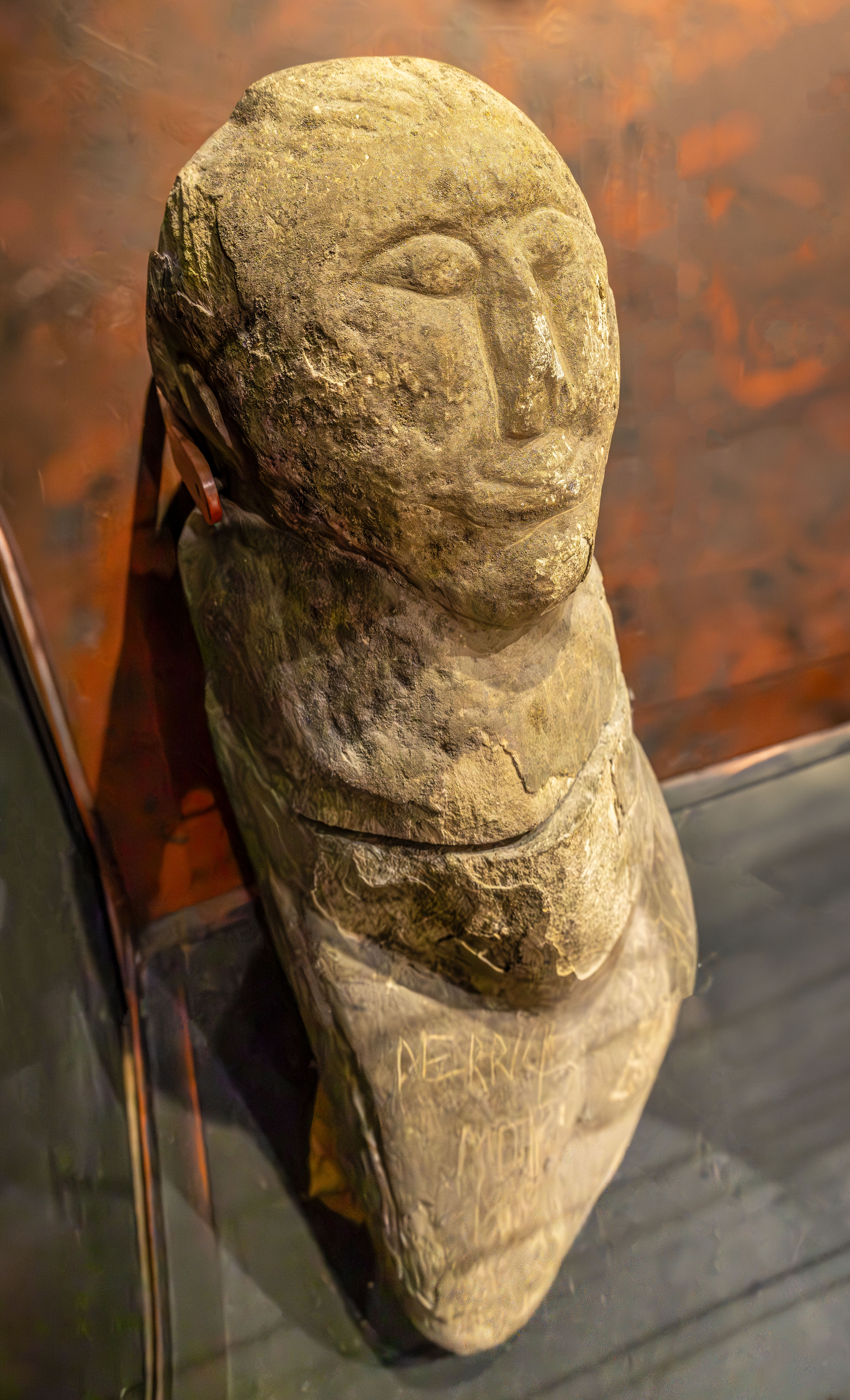
- The Huntcliff Figure on display at the Dorman Museum, Middlesbrough, North Yorkshire
- Material: Sandstone
- Created: c. 2000 BC / c. 800–1 BC
- Discovered: 1886, Saltburn-by-the-Sea
- Present location: Dorman Museum, Middlesbrough

The Huntcliff Figure is a sandstone sculpture discovered in 1886 at the foot of Hunt Cliff, near Saltburn-by-the-Sea on the North Yorkshire coast, England. Carved from a single block of stone, it has an ambiguous and highly stylised humanoid form, with a rounded abdomen and disproportionately large thighs.

As it was found after being eroded from its original setting, there is no secure archaeological context to establish its date or purpose, and its gender remains uncertain.

== Discovery and early history ==
The Huntcliff Figure was found in 1886 at the foot of Hunt Cliff, a coastal headland overlooking the North Sea. It was found on the beach, apparently after erosion had caused it to fall from the cliffs above. The circumstances of its discovery meant that the figure had become separated from its original archaeological layer, removing the surrounding evidence that might otherwise have helped researchers establish a more precise date and understand its original purpose.

After its discovery, the figure was taken to the nearby Ship Inn in Old Saltburn. Rather than being placed in a museum or examined by antiquarians, it was set on a pedestal outside the pub, where it remained for almost a century. During that period it was exposed to the weather and suffered considerable deterioration from North Sea salt spray, frost and industrial soot. It was also vandalised by pub patrons, including the deep engraving of the name "Derrick" into the stone, and a large fracturing along its chest.

In the 1980s, the Ship Inn's then-owners transferred the figure to the Dorman Museum on permanent loan. The move was intended to protect the carving from further weathering and damage.

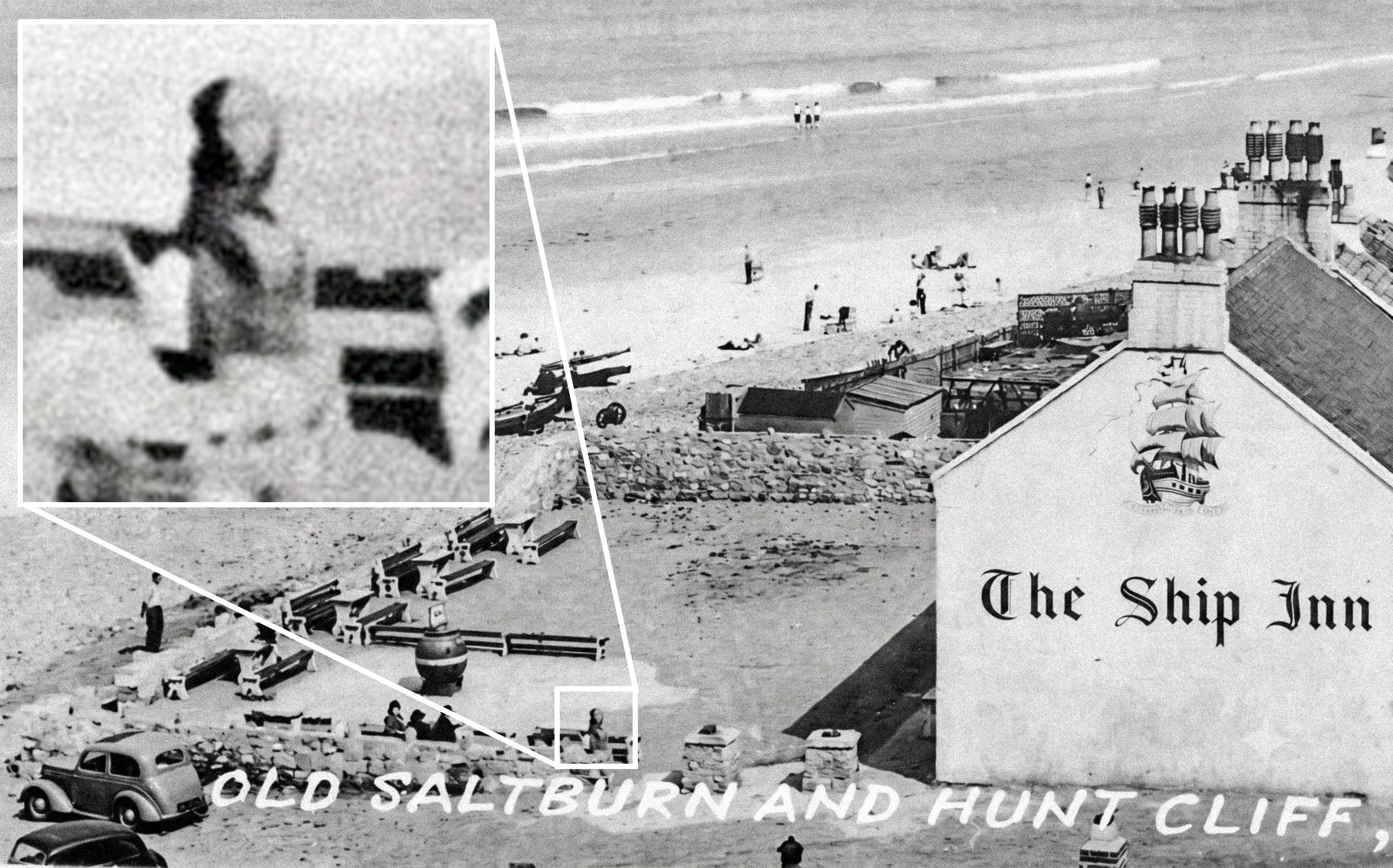
Situation of the Huntcliff Figure in the early 20th century.

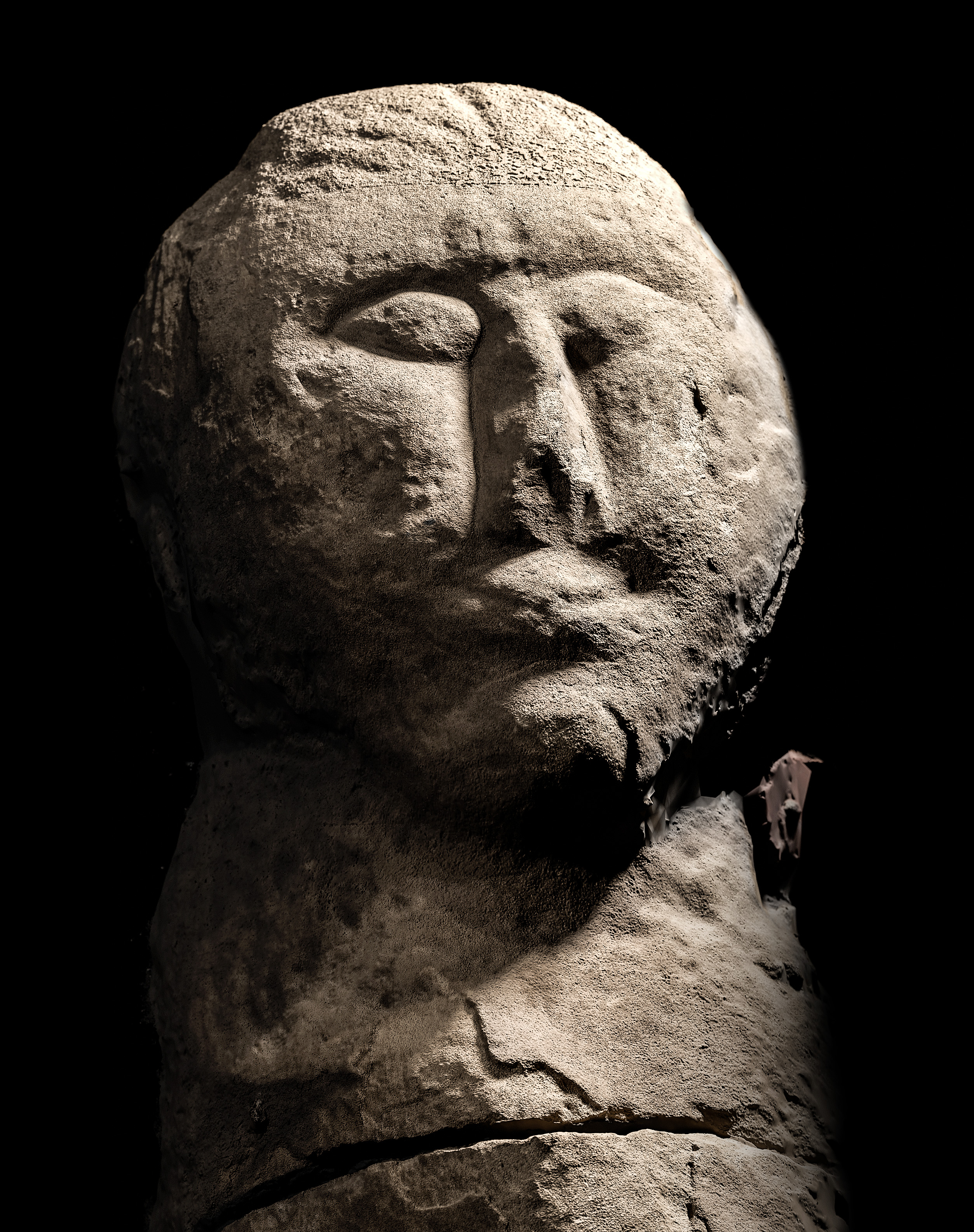
A pointcloud photogrammetry scan of the figure, showing its facial and body details.

== Dating and interpretation ==
The date and original purpose of the Huntcliff Figure are uncertain. The interpretation traditionally associated with the object, and still reflected in the current Dorman Museum display text, identifies it as a Bronze Age artefact dating to around 2000 BC and interprets it as a fertility goddess. This interpretation is based largely on the figure's prominent abdomen and heavy thighs, physical characteristics that have historically been associated with representations of fertility and childbearing in prehistoric art.

More recent archaeological opinion tends to favour an Iron Age date, broadly between about 800 BC and the 1st century AD. In his 1995 study of monuments in East Cleveland, Hedley Swain argued that the figure's squat, abstract appearance and simplified facial features are more consistent with the "Celtic stone heads" associated with Iron Age Britain. If Iron Age, it would broadly sit within the land of the Brigantes; though stonework from this culture is little understood, with few surviving examples known.

The figure's location also raises questions about its date. It was found close to a late 4th-century AD Roman signal station on the cliff above the discovery site. The proximity is noteworthy, but there is no direct evidence connecting the carving with the Roman military installation.

== Context and similar artefacts ==
The Huntcliff Figure can be considered alongside a wider group of stone carvings found throughout Northern England and the Celtic world. If its Iron Age date is correct, its style may place it within the tradition of "Celtic stone heads", a widespread phenomenon in Iron Age and Romano-British cultures in which human heads were venerated or incorporated into architectural and decorative settings.

Several other carvings provide useful points of comparison:

- The Hendy Head (Anglesey): An Iron Age stone carving with simplified, stylised facial features and an abstract form that shares stylistic similarities with the Huntcliff Figure.
- Corleck Head: an Iron Age Irish stone sculpture carved from a single block, consisting of three highly simplified human faces. Its date and function are debated, but it is generally interpreted in the context of Celtic religious sculpture.
- Bon Marché head: tThe head was discovered in Gloucester and has been interpreted as Celtic in design, although its date has been disputed: it has variously been considered Romano-Celtic and even Norman/Romanesque.
- Mšecké Žehrovice Head: one of the best-known examples of Iron Age Celtic figural sculpture. Dating to approximately 150–50 BC, it has deliberately exaggerated and highly stylised facial features.
