= William Peachey =

English architect

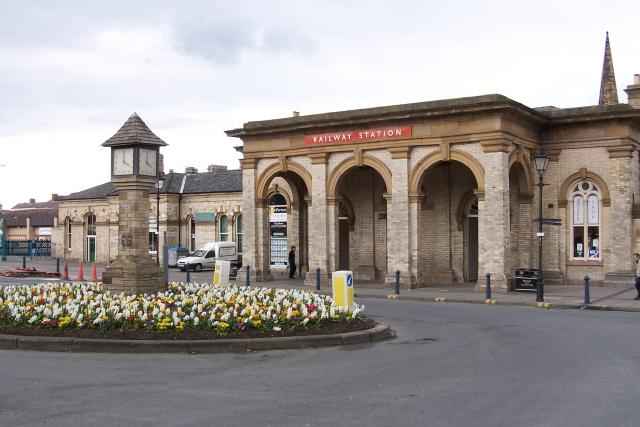
Saltburn railway station 1863

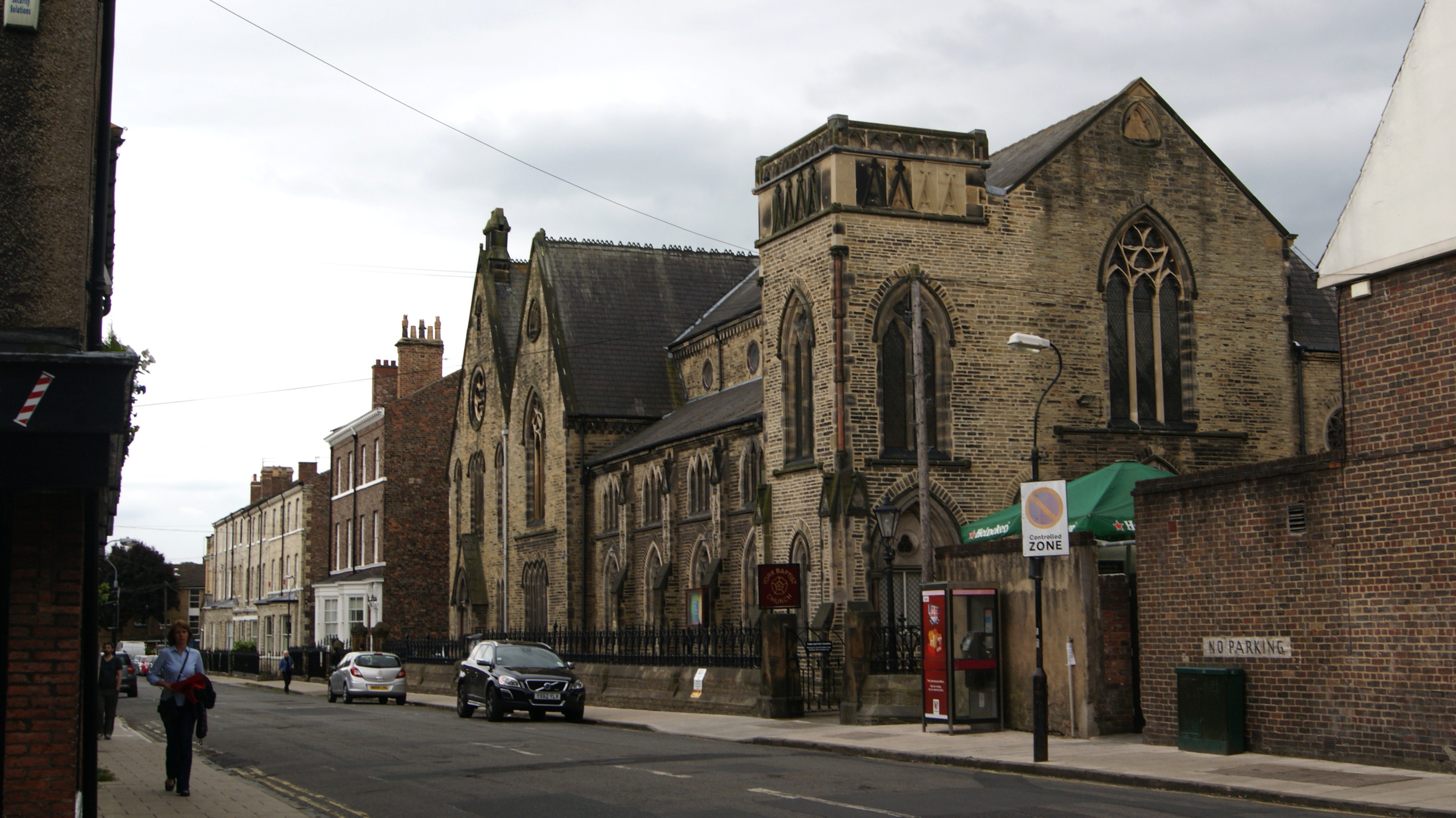
Baptist Chapel, Priory Street, York 1868

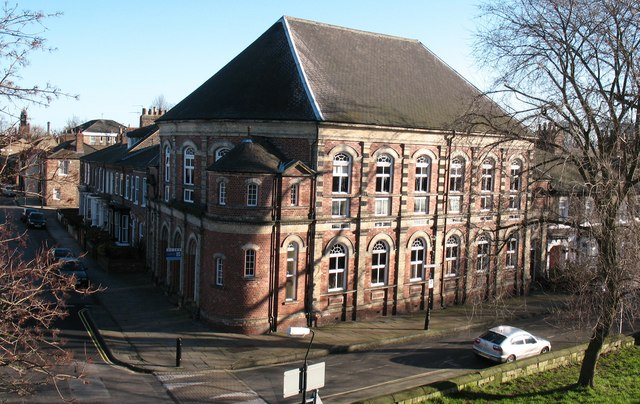
Former Methodist Chapel, Victoria Bar, York 1880

William Peachey (1826 – 2 March 1912) was an English architect known for his work for the North Eastern Railway.

== History ==
He was born in 1826, baptised at St Mary's Church, Cheltenham on 13 September. His parents were William Peachey, carpenter, and Emma.

On 8 September 1849, he married Harriet Moss in Salem Baptist Chapel in Cheltenham and in 1854 the couple moved to Darlington. He found employment with the Stockton and Darlington Railway. This was merged with the North Eastern Railway in 1863.

He was appointed ARIBA on 16 December 1867, and FRIBA on 2 May 1870. He was the Architect to the Darlington section of the North Eastern Railway until 1877.

He died on 2 March 1912.

== Works ==
- Saltburn Water Tower, [now] Upleatham Street, on Lune Street Corner 1860 [- demolished 1905] - Pease Bricks - bricks used to face a terrace of 8 houses onsite and adjacent land - called Water Tower Terrace which became Upleatham Street.
- Saltburn railway station 1861-62
- Zetland Mews, Saltburn 1861
- Zetland Hotel, Saltburn 1863
- Wesleyan Schools, North Road, Darlington 1863
- Wesleyan Chapel, Emerald Street, Saltburn 1864-65
- Forcett Pasonage
- Double Villa, Pierremont Crescent, Darlington 1866
- Etherley railway station, 1866
- Baptist Chapel, Priory Street, York 1867-68
- Baptist Chapel, Grange Road, Darlington 1870-71
- Tow Law railway station 1870-71
- Brotton railway station 1875
- North Road railway station Darlington 1876
- Middlesbrough railway station 1874-77
- York railway station 1877
- Pinchinthorpe railway station 1877
- Boosbeck railway station 1878
- Sunderland station 1879 (replaced 1965)
- Methodist Chapel, Victoria Bar, York 1880
- Harrogate Baptist Church, Victoria Avenue, Harrogate 1883
- Post Office, Regent Circus, (Windsor Road/Station Street) Saltburn 1901
