= Easington, North Yorkshire =

Village in North Yorkshire, England

Coordinates: 54.5533°N 0.8505°W

Easington
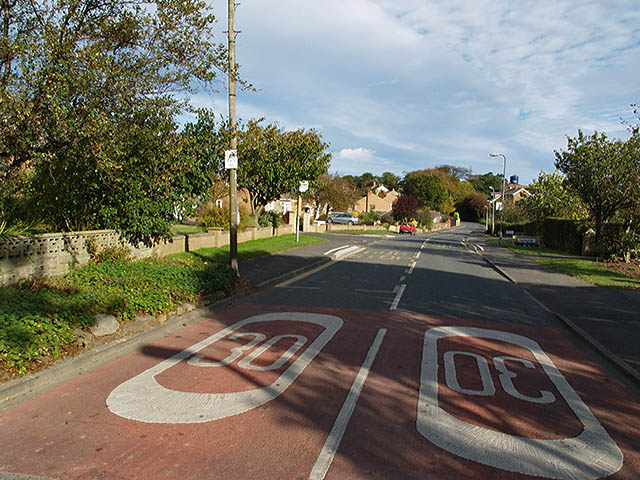
- Easington village

- Location within North Yorkshire
- Population: 923 (2011 census)
- OS grid reference: NZ744181
  - London: 210 mi (340 km) S
- Civil parish: Loftus
- Unitary authority: Redcar and Cleveland
- Ceremonial county: North Yorkshire
- Region: North East
- Country: England
- Sovereign state: United Kingdom
- Post town: SALTBURN-BY-THE-SEA
- Postcode district: TS13
- Dialling code: 01287
- Police: Cleveland
- Fire: Cleveland
- Ambulance: North East
- UK Parliament: Middlesbrough South and East Cleveland

Easington is a village in the civil parish of Loftus, in the Redcar and Cleveland district, in the ceremonial county of North Yorkshire, England and is part of the North York Moors National Park. The village is situated on the A174 road, 1 mile (1.6 km) east of Loftus, 8 miles (13 km) east of Guisborough, and 10 miles (16 km) north-west of Whitby.

== Demographics ==
Before being abolished in 1951, the civil parish had a population of 411. At the 2011 census, the village had increased to a population of 923.

== History ==
The village is mentioned in the Domesday Book as belonging to Earl Hugh of Chester and having 34 ploughlands. The village name derives from the Old English Esa-ingtūn; literally the farm or settlement of Esa's people. Historically, the name has been spelled as Esingeton and Esington.

Historically part of the North Riding of Yorkshire, the village was transferred to the new county of Cleveland in 1974. Cleveland was returned to North Yorkshire in 1996. The village is in the unitary authority of Redcar and Cleveland. Originally, the estate of Easington and Boulby had its manorhouse at the eastern end of the village. In 1799, a new estate was purchased to the south, and a new manorhouse, in what is now Grinkle Park, was built in 1802. The old manorhouse had a moat built somewhere between 1250 and 1350. The site is now part of a working farm, but it remains a scheduled ancient monument. On 1 April 1974 the parish was abolished and merged with Loftus.

All Saints Church, a Grade II listed building, was built in 1888–89 by C. Hodgson Fowler in Decorated style, largely with bequests from the Palmer family of Grinkle Park, and incorporated fragments and remains of the previous church. The side chapel and several of the furnishings are by 'Mousey' Thompson of Kilburn.

The public house, the Tiger Inn, was previously a building of the same name at the opposite end of the village.

A railway station on the Whitby, Redcar, and Middlesbrough Union Railway opened in 1883 as Easington. Its name was changed to Grinkle after the local house and seat of the Palmer Baronets of Grinkle Park in 1904. The renaming avoided confusion with the station at Easington, County Durham, also on the North Eastern Railway. The station closed on the eve of the Second World War and never reopened although the line remains a freight-only railway to Boulby Mine.

The village will be on the route that cyclists will race through on the 1st stage of the 2020 Tour de Yorkshire. The stage will start in Beverley, making its way up the Yorkshire Coast before finishing in Redcar.

== Palmer Baronets ==
The Palmer Baronets, of Grinkle Park in the County of York and of Newcastle upon Tyne, were created in the Baronetage of the United Kingdom on 31 July 1886 for Charles Palmer, a coal and shipping magnate and Liberal politician.
