= Sandsend railway station =

Former railway station in the North Riding of Yorkshire, England

Sandsend
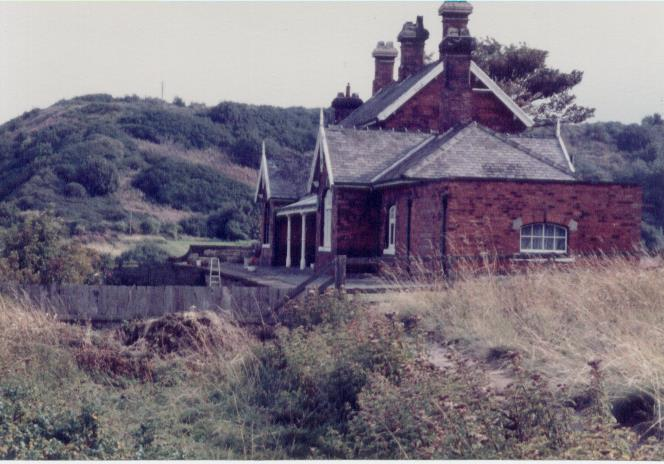
- The former station in 1981

General information
- Location: Sandsend, North Yorkshire; England
- Coordinates: 54.504200°N 0.674000°W
- Grid reference: NZ859129
- Platforms: 1

Other information
- Status: Disused

History
- Original company: WR&MUR
- Pre-grouping: North Eastern Railway

Key dates
- December 1883: Opened
- May 1958: Closed
Location

Sandsend railway station was a railway station on the Whitby, Redcar and Middlesbrough Union Railway. It was opened on 3 December 1883, and served the villages of Sandsend and Lythe. It closed on 5 May 1958. The station building is now a private residence. It was the only station between Whitby and Loftus not to possess a passing loop.

== History ==
Sandsend railway station was located on the Whitby, Middlesbrough and Redcar Union Railway, some 4 miles 2 chains (6.5 km) north west of Whitby West Cliff and 12 miles 64 chains (20.6 km) south east of Loftus. It had a single platform, a brick station building which included the stationmaster's house, and a single siding serving coal drops (now converted into garages) behind the station. Camping coaches were stationed on the siding in later years.

A passing loop was never added because of the extensive works it would have required. This made Sandsend, the only one of the seven stations between, and including Whitby and Loftus, which did not have a passing loop. A small goods yard with a warehouse and a 2-tonne (2.2-ton) crane was situated 0.5 miles (0.8 km) from the station at East Row, towards Whitby. This yard also had space for camping coaches, with three being normally located there.

Sandsend Viaduct was sited immediately south of the station. A pillbox which was built in the Second World War to defend the viaduct is still in place.

In October 2020 the Mulgrave Estate, owners of the land that the station covered, successfully applied to site railway coaches on the platform as holiday accommodation. The two railway vehicles will sit on the platform on a short section of track. One is a former passenger-carrying coach whilst the second is a converted freight wagon.

== Services ==
Originally, the services on the line were worked only as far as Whitby West Cliff, until the opening of the line southwards through Robin Hood's Bay to Scarborough. Between 1910 and 1922, services in the summer consisted of six daily trains each way. This had risen by 1938 to 14 each way, though in winter, the number of services could be as low as three.

== In popular culture ==
In the 1947 British comedy drama Holiday Camp, the opening shots of a train arriving at a seaside cliff-top station and passengers boarding buses outside the station were filmed at Sandsend.

Preceding station	Disused railways	Following station
Kettleness; Line and station closed	North Eastern Railway; WR&MU	Whitby West Cliff; Line and station closed
