= Guisborough railway station =

Former railway station in North Yorkshire, England

Guisborough
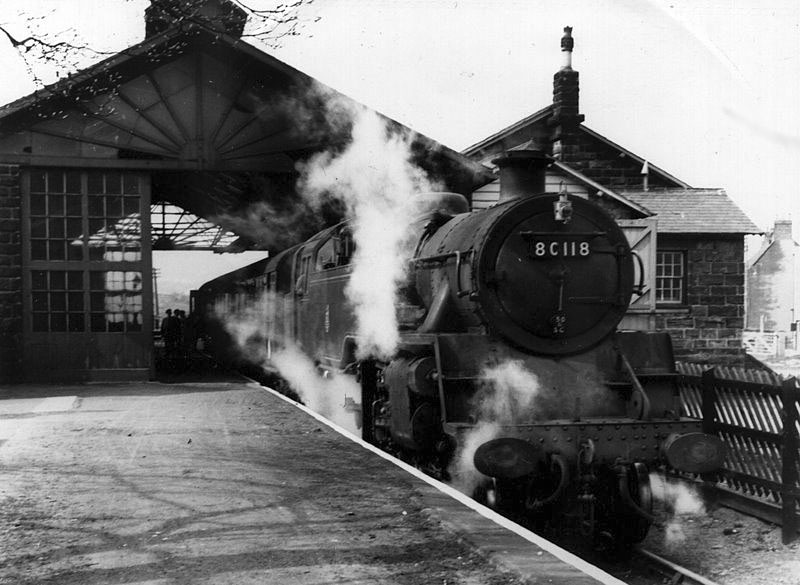
- British Rail Standard Class 4 2-6-4T engine no. 80118 at Guisborough railway station, 1950s

General information
- Location: Guisborough, Redcar and Cleveland; England
- Coordinates: 54.534192°N 1.050322°W
- Grid reference: NZ615158
- Platforms: 1

Other information
- Status: Disused

History
- Original company: Middlesbrough and Guisborough Railway
- Pre-grouping: North Eastern Railway
- Post-grouping: London and North Eastern Railway

Key dates
- 11 November 1853: Opened to goods
- 25 February 1854: Opened to passengers
- 2 March 1964: Closed to passengers
- 31 August 1964: Closed completely
Location

Guisborough railway station was the terminus of the Middlesbrough and Guisborough Railway. It served the town of Guisborough in North Yorkshire, England. The station was opened to goods in November 1853, and to passenger traffic on 25 February 1854. The station was closed to passengers, along with the entire Nunthorpe–Guisborough branch, on 2 March 1964, with freight being withdrawn in August 1964.

== History ==
The station had a single platform covered by a glass roof. Its entrance was on Bow Street, between its junctions with Fountain Street and Whitby Road. It was opened to goods traffic on 11 November 1853, and passengers on 25 February 1854.

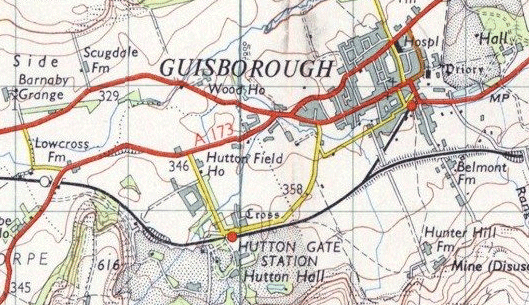
Map of Guisborough in 1958, showing the location of the station (right of centre)

Because the station was at the end of a branch, trains had to reverse out to Hutton Junction (Guisborough Junction from 1932) in order to continue eastwards along the NER line (the former eastern part of the Cleveland Railway). Services could either go to Loftus, or to Saltburn (from 1878 to 1917 on the Priestcroft Curve or via Brotton).

In 1932, the signal box at Guisborough station was closed, and all workings in and out of the station were controlled from the signal box at Hutton Junction, renamed to Guisborough. The double track line was then worked as a single track line for passenger trains (southernmost) and a single track line for goods traffic only. The Railway Clearing House list from 1904 shows that Guisborough had a crane that could lift 6 tonnes (6.6 tons) and could accommodate livestock, general goods, furniture vans and horse boxes.

The station was listed for closure in the Beeching Report of March 1963, with the last passenger train running on 28 February 1964, closing completely in August of the same year. The station building was demolished during redevelopment works in 1967. Rectory Lane now cuts directly through the station's former site.

Preceding station	Disused railways	Following station
Hutton Junction; Line and station closed	North Eastern Railway; Middlesbrough & Guisborough Railway	Boosbeck (reversal at Hutton Junction); Line and station closed
