= North Skelton railway station =

Closed railway station in North Yorkshire, England

North Skelton

General information
- Location: Skelton-in-Cleveland, Redcar and Cleveland; England
- Coordinates: 54.562200°N 0.963350°W
- Grid reference: NZ671190
- Platforms: 2

Other information
- Status: Disused

History
- Original company: North Eastern Railway
- Pre-grouping: North Eastern Railway

Key dates
- 1875: Opened to freight
- 1902: Opened to passengers
- 1951: Closed to passengers
- 1952: Closed to freight
- 1956: Reopened to freight as a private siding
- 1964: Final closure
Location

North Skelton railway station was opened to freight on 1 August 1875 by the North Eastern Railway and to passengers on 1 July 1902. It served the village of Skelton-in-Cleveland in North Yorkshire, England. It closed to passengers on 15 January 1951, but opened again briefly on 18 June for the summer season before finally closing to passengers on 10 September of the same year. Freight traffic remained until 1 February 1952. In October 1956 the station was reopened to freight as a private siding which was finally closed on 21 January 1964.

The line remains open as a single-track goods line from Boulby and Skinningrove to Teesside, but most of the station buildings and the platforms have been removed. The stationmaster's house remained as a private residence until 2017 when it was demolished after a suspected arson attack.

Preceding station	Disused railways	Following station
Saltburn	North Eastern Railway	Brotton (eastbound)
Saltburn	North Eastern Railway	Boosbeck (westbound)
