= Skinningrove =

Village in North Yorkshire, England

Coordinates: 54.570000°N 0.900000°W

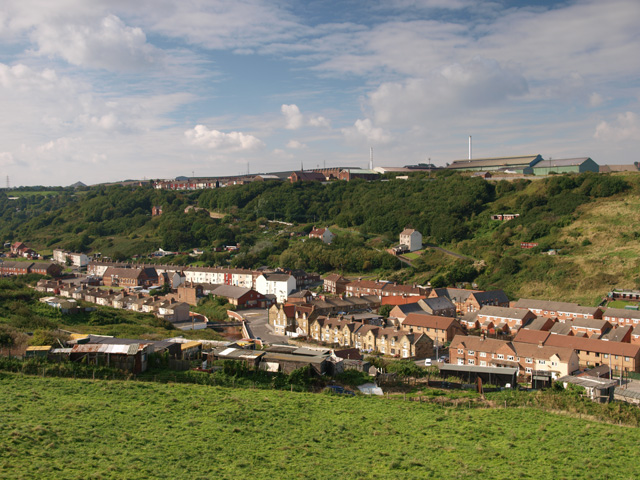

- Location within North Yorkshire
- Population: 460
- OS grid reference: NZ711199
- Civil parish: Loftus
- Unitary authority: Redcar and Cleveland
- Ceremonial county: North Yorkshire
- Region: North East
- Country: England
- Sovereign state: United Kingdom
- Post town: SALTBURN-BY-THE-SEA
- Postcode district: TS13
- Police: Cleveland
- Fire: Cleveland
- Ambulance: North East
- UK Parliament: Middlesbrough South and East Cleveland

Skinningrove is a village in the civil parish of Loftus, in the Redcar and Cleveland district, in the ceremonial county of North Yorkshire, England. Its name is of Old Norse origin and is thought to mean skinners' grove or pit.

== Demographics ==
In 1951 the parish had a population of 2,011.

== History ==
The village had an agricultural and fishing economy, until the opening of local ironstone workings, in 1848, initiated an industrialisation boom. A railway was built by 1865, and iron smelting began in 1874.

A jetty on the coast, built in 1880, allowed seagoing vessels to carry heavy cargoes from the area. Mining continued until 1958, and primary iron production until the 1970s.

Skinningrove was formerly a township in the parish of Brotton. In 1866, it became a separate civil parish.

=== Oarfish ===
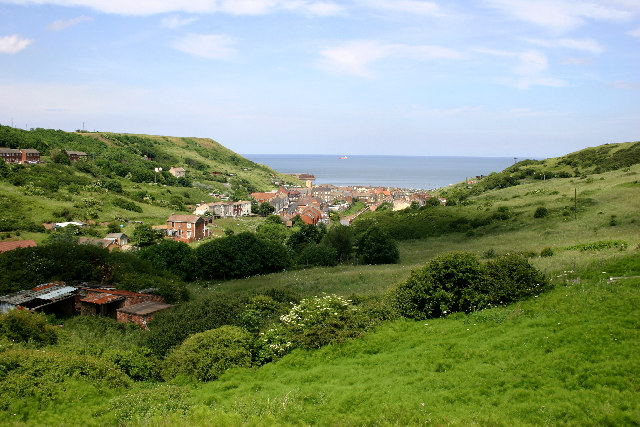
Skinningrove showing the North Sea in the background

On 17 February 2003, a rarely seen oarfish was caught by angler Val Fletcher, using a fishing rod baited with squid. The fish was 11 ft 4 in (3.3 m) long and weighed 140 lb (63.5 kg). Graham Hill, the science officer at the Deep, an aquarium in Hull, said that he had never heard of another oarfish being caught off the coast of Britain.

The Natural History Museum in London said that it would have been interested in preserving the fish in its permanent collection; however the fish had been 'cut up into steaks' before any scientists could examine it.

== Landmarks ==
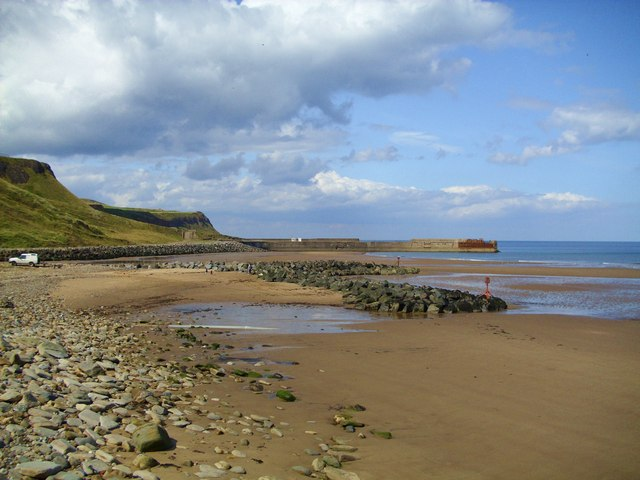
Beach of Skinningrove

The Land of Iron (formerly the Cleveland Ironstone Mining Museum and the Tom Leonard Mining Museum) displays the village's mining heritage. Built on the site of the area's first ironstone mine, it provides an underground experience and an insight into how 6.2 million tons of ironstone was extracted from Skinningrove mines.

The village has a large natural sandy beach used for recreational fishing and a beck, which occasionally floods, notably in 2000.

The Methodist chapel closed in 2024, due to lack of numbers. It has now been converted into two houses. The pipe organ from the chapel, which dates from 1910, was sold to a local museum.

The Cleveland Way National Trail passes through the village.

== Culture and events ==
From 1982 to 2019, Skinningrove hosted a bonfire and fireworks display, which attracted hundreds of people from around North Yorkshire. Each year, the bonfire was based on a different theme. The bonfire was discontinued from 2023, due to safety concerns and local infrastructure being unable to cope with the large crowds.

Photographer Chris Killip created an unpublished photo series about the town's residents in the early 1980s, about which the American filmmaker Michael Almereyda produced a short film. The film won Best Non-Fiction Short at the 2012 Sundance Film Festival.

== See also ==
- Skinningrove railway station
