= Skinningrove railway station =

Former railway station in the North Riding of Yorkshire, England

Skinningrove
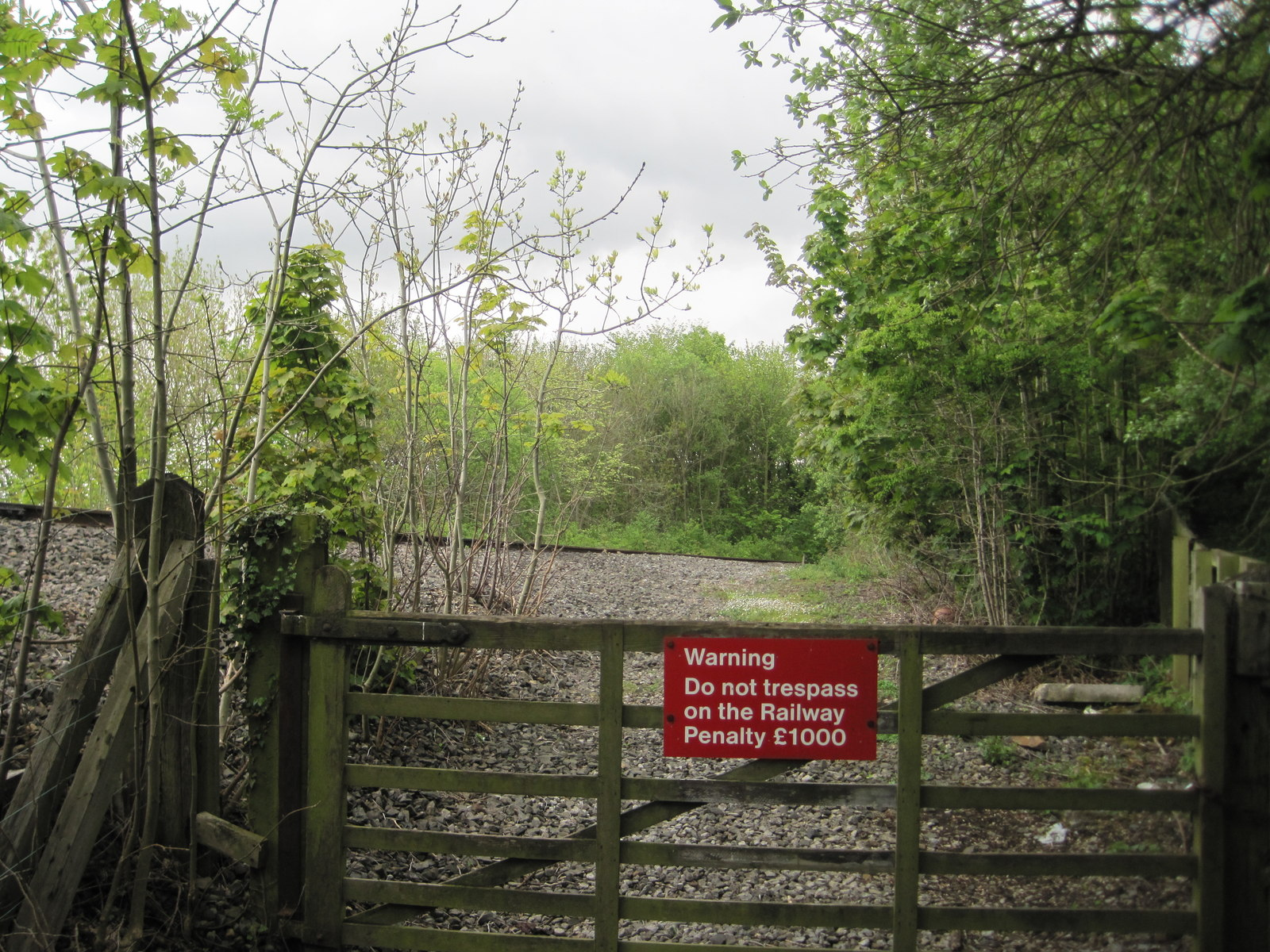
- Site of the former station (2015)

General information
- Location: Skinningrove, Redcar and Cleveland; England
- Coordinates: 54.560400°N 0.905200°W
- Grid reference: NZ708188
- Platforms: 1

Other information
- Status: Disused

History
- Original company: WR&MUR
- Pre-grouping: North Eastern Railway

Key dates
- 1875: Opened as Carlin How
- 1903: Renamed Skinningrove
- 1952: Closed to regular passenger trains
- 1958: Closed to all traffic
Location

Skinningrove railway station was on the Whitby, Redcar and Middlesbrough Union Railway. It was opened on 1 April 1875, and served the villages of Skinningrove and Carlin How in North Yorkshire, England. It was originally named "Carlin How", but was renamed on 1 October 1903 by the North Eastern Railway. It had no goods service, but a zig zag track branched off just outside the station from a point on the main line towards Saltburn, serving the Loftus Mines in the valley below, where ironstone was mined. This closed in 1958. Further north towards Brotton, near the village of Carlin How, the tracks serving Skinningrove Steelworks branch off the line.

Skinningrove station closed to regular passenger traffic on 30 June 1952, but retained a workmen's service to the Skinningrove Steelworks until 5 May 1958. Very little remains of the former station.

| Preceding station | Disused railways | Following station |
|---|---|---|
| Brotton; Line open, station closed | North Eastern Railway; WR&MU | Loftus; Line open, station closed |
