= Brotton railway station =

Former railway station in the North Riding of Yorkshire, England

Brotton
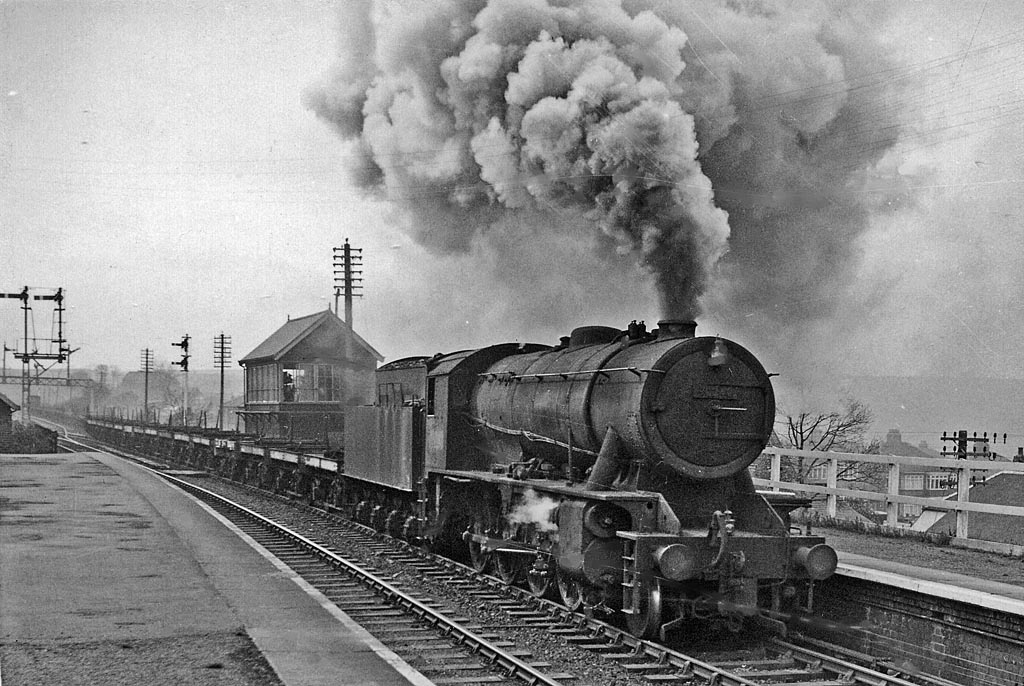
- Brotton Station in 1961

General information
- Location: Brotton, Redcar and Cleveland; England
- Coordinates: 54.566650°N 0.940850°W
- Grid reference: NZ685195
- Platforms: 2

Other information
- Status: Disused

History
- Original company: North Eastern Railway
- Pre-grouping: North Eastern Railway

Key dates
- 1 November 1875: Opened
- 2 May 1960: Closed
Location

Brotton railway station served the village of Brotton in North Yorkshire, England.

The station was opened by the North Eastern Railway on 1 November 1875 on the former freight only Cleveland Railway that it had acquired in 1865.

It was built to the designs of the architect William Peachey.

It closed on 2 May 1960.

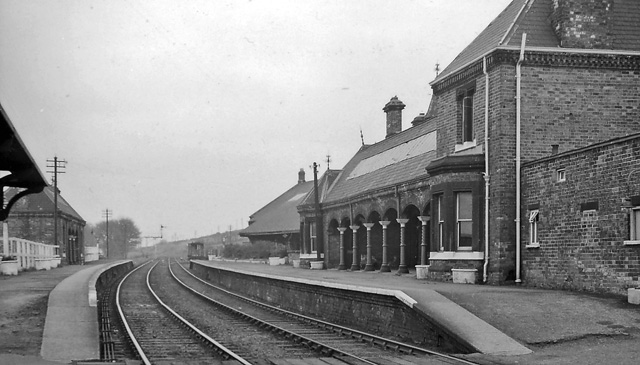
View northward, towards Loftus and Whitby in 1961

Preceding station	Disused railways	Following station
Boosbeck	North Eastern Railway Former Cleveland Railway	Terminus
North Skelton	Whitby Redcar and Middlesbrough Union Railway	Skinningrove

== Bibliography ==
- Grant, Donald J. (2017). Directory of the Railway Companies of Great Britain (1st ed.). Kibworth Beauchamp, Leicestershire: Troubador Publishing Ltd. ISBN 978-1-78803-768-6.
- Quick, Michael (2023) [2001]. Railway passenger stations in Great Britain: a chronology (PDF). version 5.05. Railway & Canal Historical Society.
