= Loftus railway station, Yorkshire =

Former railway station in the North Riding of Yorkshire, England

Loftus
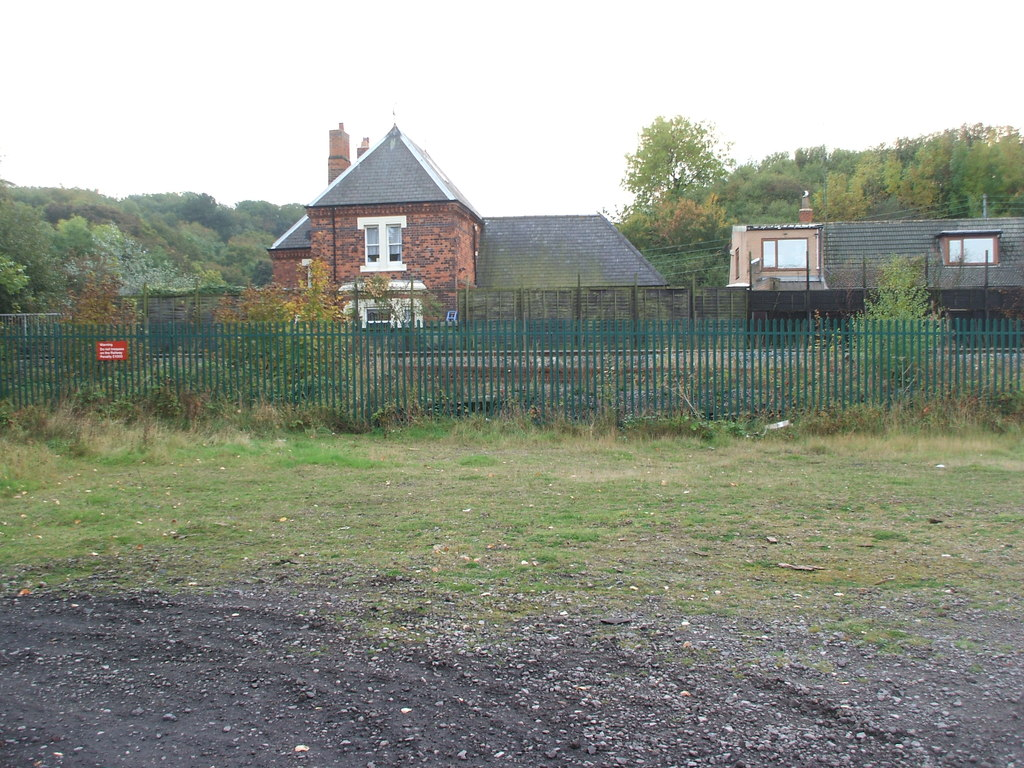
- Site of the former station with stationmaster's house, 2009

General information
- Location: Loftus, Redcar and Cleveland; England
- Coordinates: 54.552236°N 0.894000°W
- Grid reference: NZ716180
- Platforms: 2

Other information
- Status: Disused

History
- Original company: Whitby Redcar and Middlesbrough Union Railway
- Pre-grouping: North Eastern Railway
- Post-grouping: London and North Eastern Railway

Key dates
- 1875: Opened
- 1960: Closed to passengers
Location

Loftus, previously Lofthouse, was a railway station on the Whitby, Redcar and Middlesbrough Union Railway (WR&MU). It was opened on 1 April 1875 as the terminus of a line from Saltburn, and served the town of Loftus. When the line to Whitby was opened on 3 December 1883, it became a through station with two platforms and a goods yard consisting of three sidings, and a water tank capable of holding 9,000 imperial gallons (41,000 L; 11,000 US gal). The cost of converting the terminal station into a through station was £950 (equivalent to £100,000 in 2025). The station was poorly sited as it was not near the town centre, and the road through Loftus town passed through an adjacent valley away from the station.

Though the WR&MU line closed in 1958, Loftus returned to being a terminus, with a diesel service to Guisborough and Middlesbrough for two years until it closed to passenger traffic on 2 May 1960 and goods traffic on 12 August 1963. The tracks through the station were lifted in 1964.

Though a single track was relaid from Skinningrove by 1 April 1974 to allow freight trains to reach Boulby Mine, the station remains closed, and most buildings have been demolished. The stationmaster's house is now a private residence, the large brick-build goods shed also remains standing.

Preceding station	Disused railways	Following station
Skinningrove; Line open, station closed	North Eastern Railway; WR&MU	Grinkle; Line open, station closed
