= Whitby, Redcar and Middlesbrough Union Railway =

Former railway line in Yorkshire, England

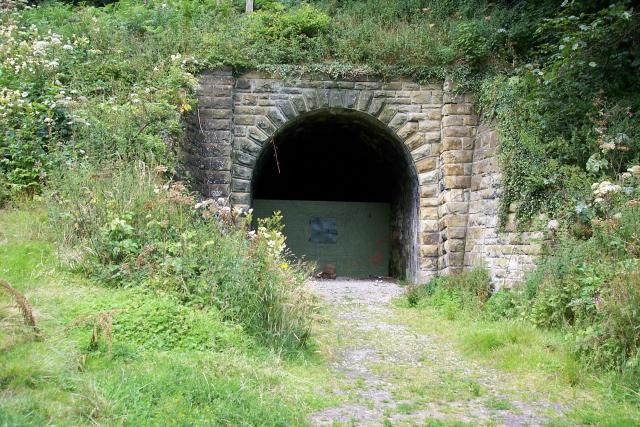
- Blocked Sandsend (Deepdale) tunnel

Overview
- Other name: Whitby – Loftus Railway
- Status: Partially closed
- Locale: North Yorkshire, England
- Stations: 7

Service
- Type: Heavy rail

History
- Opened: 3 December 1883
- Closed: 5 May 1958

Technical
- Line length: 16 miles 66 chains (27.1 km)
- Num of tracks: 1 (with passing loops)
- Track gauge: 4 ft 8 1/2 in (1,435 mm) standard gauge

The Whitby, Redcar and Middlesbrough Union Railway (WRMU), a.k.a. the Whitby–Loftus Line, was a railway line in North Yorkshire, England, built between 1871 and 1886, running from Loftus on the Yorkshire coast to the Esk at Whitby, and connecting Middlesbrough to Whitby along the coast.

For much of its journey the line hugged the cliffs, and had a troubled build due to the proximity to the sea and poor quality of the construction on many of its original bridges and viaducts. The line was closed to passengers in May 1958, but the northern section to Boulby Potash Mine re-opened in the 1970s.

== History ==
=== Background ===
Whitby had been connected to the national rail system by the Whitby and Pickering Railway since the 1830s. Loftus was connected to the rail system by the 1870s via an extension of the Cleveland Railway: both the Cleveland Railway and the Middlesbrough and Guisborough Railway were constructed in the 1860s connecting Middlesbrough to Guisborough.

=== Loftus to Whitby ===
Whitby, Redcar, and Middlesborough Union Railway Act 1866
- Act of Parliament
- Parliament of the United Kingdom
- Long title: An Act for making a Railway in the North Riding of the County of York, to be called "The Whitby, Redcar, and Middlesborough Union Railway;" and for other Purposes.
- Citation: 29 & 30 Vict. c. cxcv

Dates
- Royal assent: 16 July 1866

Text of statute as originally enacted

Whitby, Redcar, and Middlesborough Union Railway Act 1873
- Act of Parliament
- Parliament of the United Kingdom
- Long title: An Act to authorise the diversion and alteration of the Line and Levels of the Whitby, Redcar, and Middlesborough Union Railway; and for other purposes.
- Citation: 36 & 37 Vict. c. cxxi

Dates
- Royal assent: 7 July 1873

Text of statute as originally enacted

Whitby, Redcar and Middlesbrough Union Railway Act 1875
- Act of Parliament
- Parliament of the United Kingdom
- Long title: An Act authorising the Lease and Transfer of the Whitby, Redcar, and Middlesbrough Union Railway to the North-eastern Railway Company; and for other purposes.
- Citation: 38 & 39 Vict. c. clvi

Dates
- Royal assent: 19 July 1875

The 16 miles 66 chains (27.1 km) extension of the line from Loftus to Whitby Town railway station, was authorised by an act of Parliament, the Whitby, Redcar, and Middlesborough Union Railway Act 1866 (29 & 30 Vict. c. cxcv) in 1866, with the majority of construction carried out under John Dickson between 1871 and 1886. Due to a lack of funds and problems with the contractor work was suspended on the route until the NER took up the lease by the Whitby, Redcar and Middlesbrough Union Railway Act 1875 (38 & 39 Vict. c. clvi). John Waddell won the contract, and the line was scheduled to open on 13 July 1881, but due to the extra work required to bring it up to standard, it was a further two and a half years before the line was opened on 3 December 1883. Many bridges were defective and piers did not sit vertically correct. The original tunnels were out of line so that when boring was done from either end they did not meet in the centre. Part of the proposed line was dangerously close to the cliff edge and was abandoned by the NER which took a route further inland through Sandsend and Kettleness tunnels. The line had gradients, heavily engineered sections (bridges, tunnels), and sea-frets to contend with, and as such, line speeds were imposed. Even so, it was quicker to travel on the railway from Middlesbrough and Stockton to Scarborough than by road. The line was single track throughout, but all stations, bar Sandsend, had passing loops.

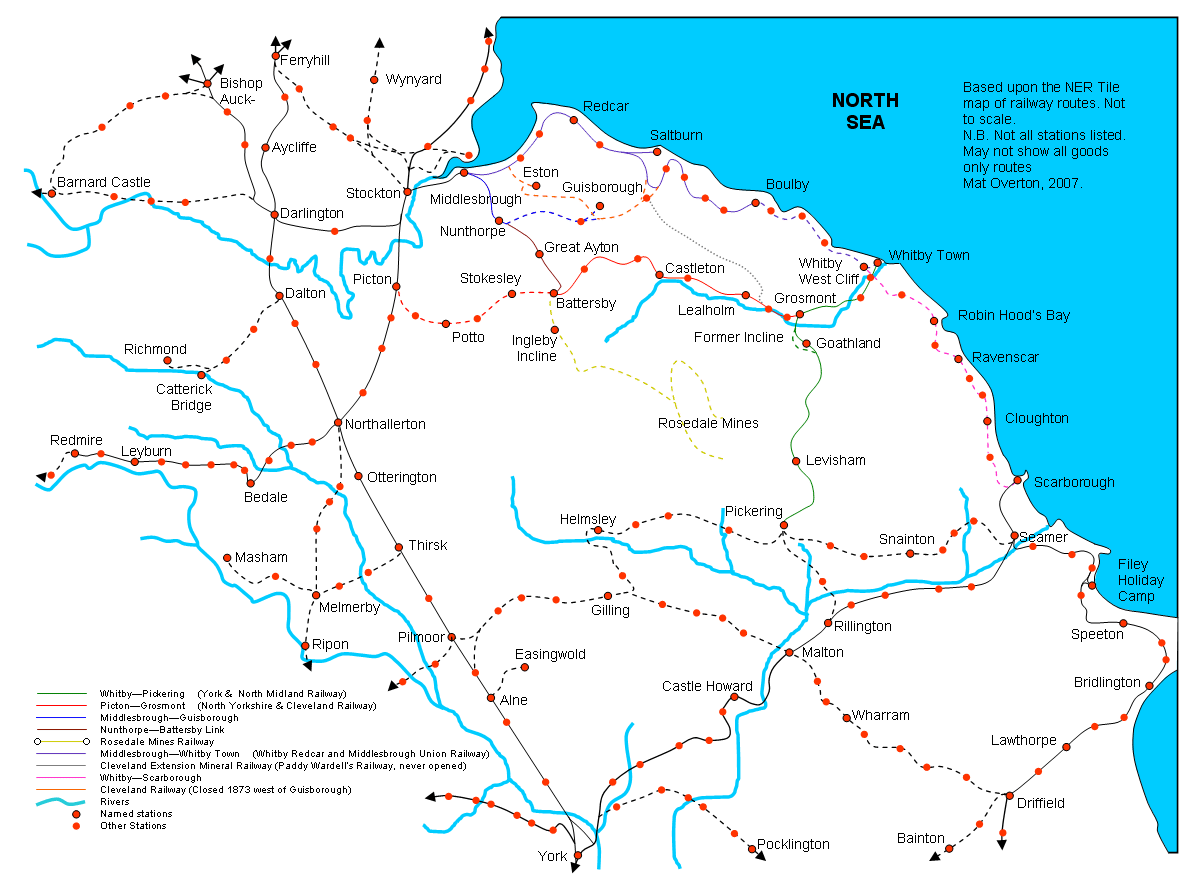
Map of route and surrounding railways

The section ran from Whitby to Loftus, where it joined the NER Middlesbrough – Loftus route head on. From the beginning the line was run by the NER, which held the lease and ran services to Whitby along the Esk Valley Line and the Malton – Whitby Line. The NER took over the line fully via the North-eastern Railway Act 1889 (52 & 53 Vict. c. lx).

British Railways published a proposal to close the line in September 1957; the line's operating costs exceeded its revenue generation, closure would result in a yearly saving of £10,950 operating costs and avoid £57,000 (equivalent to £1,190,000 in 2025) of structural maintenance (over five years) required on tunnels and viaducts particularly between Sandsend and Kettleness. With dwindling passengers after the war years, the route was only popular during summer weekends and closed on 5 May 1958. Whitby West Cliff station remained open for another three years, serving trains from Whitby to Scarborough until it closed on 12 June 1961, after which Scarborough trains had to reverse at Prospect Hill Junction where the line from Whitby Town met those from Scarborough and Loftus.

In 1960, work began to dismantle the line, viaducts were sold for scrap metal and concrete was used in the construction of sea defences.

== The railway today ==
In 1973, a 4 1/2-mile (7.2 km) section of the line at the northern end was re-opened, after Cleveland Potash Ltd developed Boulby potash mine next to the former route, north of the village of Boulby in Redcar and Cleveland. This section of the line remains open as a freight line, but the stations remain closed. The dismantled section south of Boulby is now a footpath.

In January 2019, the Campaign for Better Transport released a report identifying the line between Saltburn and Loftus which was listed as Priority 2 for reopening. Priority 2 is for those lines which require further development or a change in circumstances (such as housing developments).
