= North Berwick (disambiguation) =

North Berwick may refer to:

- North Berwick, in Scotland
- North Berwick (Parliament of Scotland constituency), pre-1707
- North Berwick, Maine, a town in the United States
  - North Berwick (CDP), Maine, the primary village in the town
- North Berwick Line, a railway line linking Edinburgh with North Berwick in Scotland
- North Berwick Law, a conical hill overlooking North Berwick, Scotland
- North Berwick West Links, a golf course in North Berwick, Scotland
- North Berwick railway station, serving North Berwick, Scotland
- North Berwick witch trials in 1590 in North Berwick, Scotland
- Hew Dalrymple, Lord North Berwick (1652–1737), Scottish judge and politician
