= Prestonpans railway station =

Railway station in East Lothian, Scotland

Prestonpans
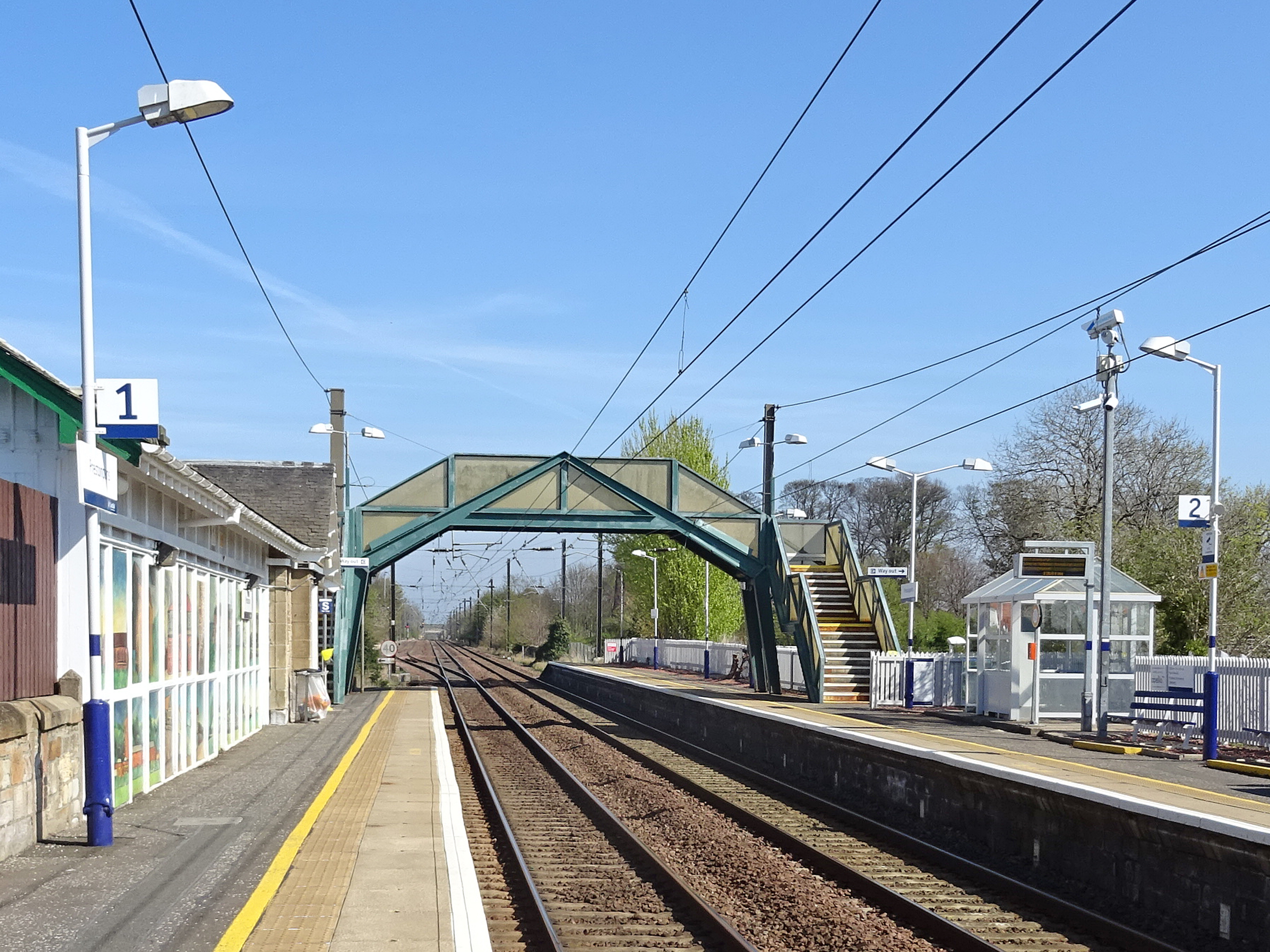
- View east towards Longniddry in 2017

General information
- Location: Prestonpans, East Lothian; Scotland
- Coordinates: 55.9529°N 2.9750°W
- Grid reference: NT392737
- Managed by: ScotRail
- Platforms: 2

Other information
- Station code: PST

History
- Original company: North British Railway
- Post-grouping: LNER

Key dates
- 1846: opened

Passengers
- 2020/21: ▼33,770
- 2021/22: ▲0.129 million
- 2022/23: ▲0.173 million
- 2023/24: ▲0.236 million
- 2024/25: ▲0.258 million
Location
Notes
- Passenger statistics from the Office of Rail and Road

Prestonpans railway station is a railway station serving the mining town of Prestonpans, East Lothian, Scotland. It is located on the North Berwick Line, 9.75 miles (15.69 km) east of Edinburgh Waverley. It serves the town of Cockenzie and Port Seton, 1.37 miles (2.20 km) away.

== Services ==
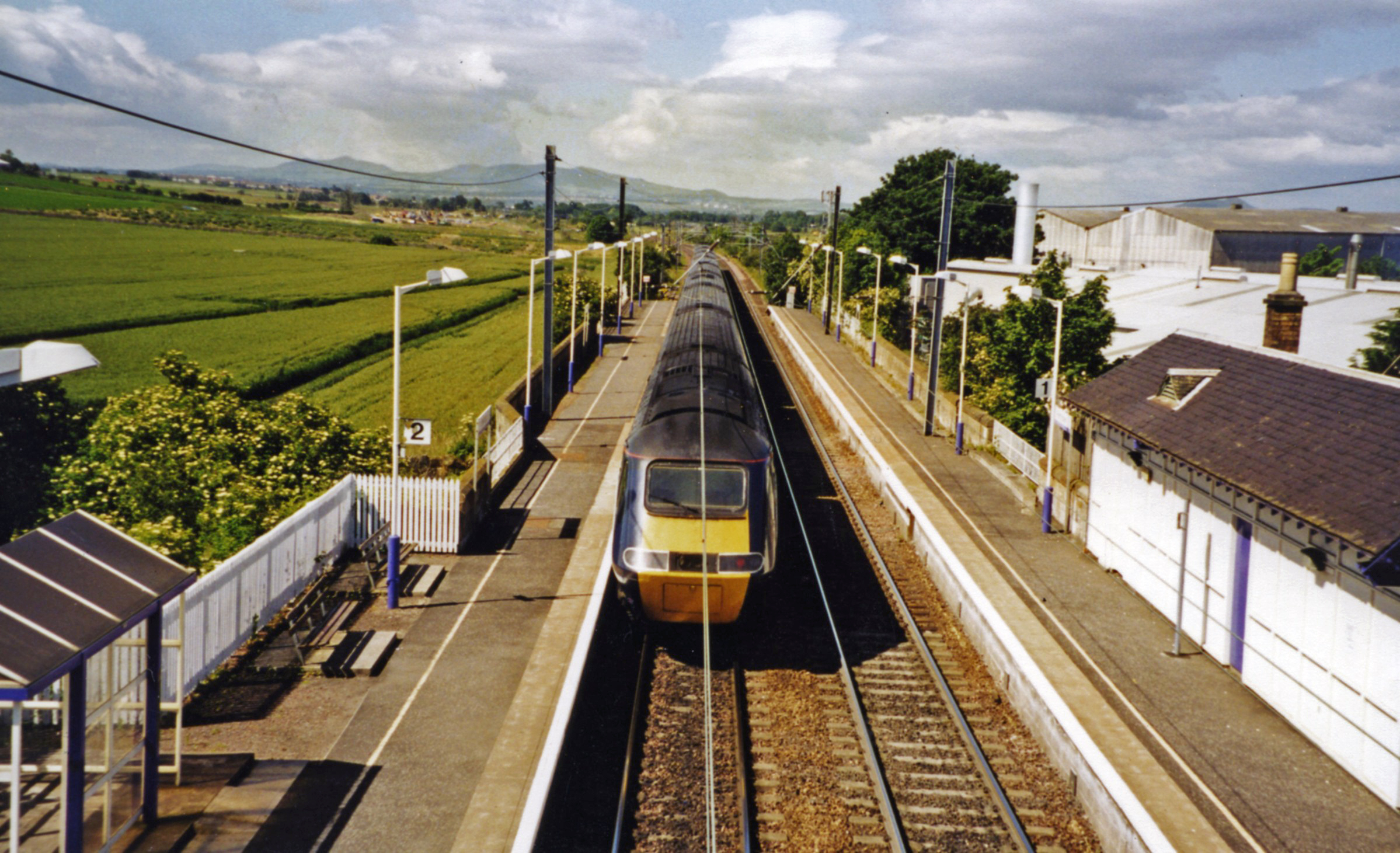
View west towards Edinburgh with Arthur's Seat and the Pentland Hills visible (2002)

On Monday to Friday daytimes there is an hourly service westbound to Edinburgh and eastbound to North Berwick, with extra trains at peak periods. On Saturdays, a half-hourly service operates during the day, dropping to hourly in the evening. Trains also call hourly each way on Sundays from mid-morning.

=== Routes ===
Preceding station	National Rail	Following station
Longniddry	ScotRail; North Berwick Line	Wallyford
	Historical railways	
Seton Mains Halt; Line open; Station closed	North British Railway; NBR Main Line	Inveresk; Line open; Station closed
