= Williamstown railway station (East Lothian) =

Former railway station in Scotland

Williamstown

General information
- Location: North Berwick, East Lothian; Scotland
- Coordinates: 56.05262°N 2.73923°W
- Platforms: 1

Other information
- Status: Disused

History
- Original company: North British Railway

Key dates
- 13 August 1849: Opened
- 17 June 1850: Closed
Location

Williamstown railway station was a railway station on the North Berwick Branch of the North British Railway in East Lothian, Scotland. This short-lived station was the temporary terminus of the branch line from Drem. The station was named after a nearby farm, the modern spelling of which is Williamstone.

== History ==
Williamstown was a temporary station built to serve the town of North Berwick until the permanent terminus in the town was completed. It was open from 13 August 1849, when the branch from Drem opened, until 17 June 1850, when North Berwick and Dirleton stations opened. The station at Williamstown was then removed, and no trace of it now remains.

Had the Aberlady, Gullane and North Berwick Railway completed their projected line, it would have formed a junction with the North Berwick branch just south of Williamstone. However, the line did not progress any further than Gullane.

The former North Berwick gasworks at Ferrygate was a short distance south-west of Williamstone. The gasworks was once an important customer for the railway, receiving large quantities of coal. The gasworks closed in 1972, by which time its two sidings (controlled by a ground frame) were already out of use.

== Previous services ==
Preceding station	Historical railways	Following station
North Berwick; Line and Station open	North British Railway; North Berwick Branch	Dirleton; Line open; Station closed
