= Ballencrieff, East Lothian =

Coordinates: 55.994°N 2.829°W

Ballencrieff: Scottish Gaelic: Baile na Craoibhe
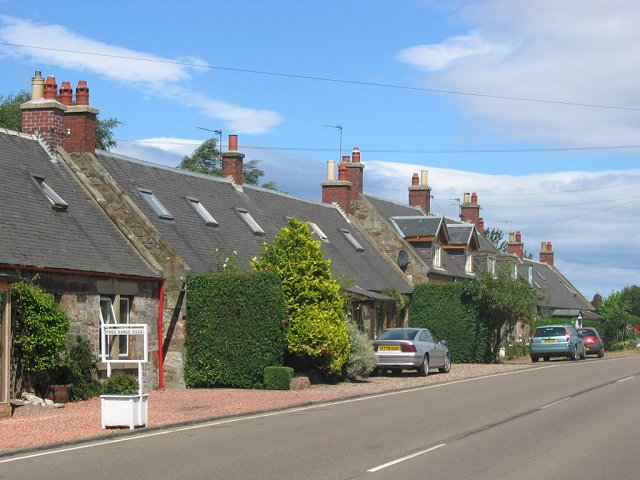
- Houses adjacent to the B1377 at Ballencrieff

- Location within Scotland
- OS grid reference: NT483781
- Council area: East Lothian Council
- Lieutenancy area: East Lothian
- Country: Scotland
- Sovereign state: United Kingdom
- Post town: LONGNIDDRY
- Postcode district: EH32
- Dialling code: 01875
- Police: Scotland
- Fire: Scottish
- Ambulance: Scottish
- UK Parliament: Lothian East
- Scottish Parliament: East Lothian

Ballencrieff is a rural community in East Lothian, Scotland. It lies between the towns of Aberlady, Drem, Haddington and Longniddry and is approximately 20 miles north-east of Edinburgh.

The name comes from the Gaelic Baile na Craoibhe, meaning "stead of the tree". There is a prehistoric enclosure at Ballencrieff Mains which is a Scheduled Ancient Monument.

Ballencrief is just west of a roundabout where the A6137 road (Haddington to Aberlady) is crossed by the B1377 (Longniddry to Drem). The village comprises typical rural housing, and there was some industry in the past. There is a farm and farm shop which breeds rare breed pigs. Nearby Ballencrieff Castle was built in 1507; this was the seat of the Murray family, the Lords Elibank, and James Murray (governor of Quebec) was born here in 1721. There is a 16th-century granary near the castle.

There was a brickworks in Ballencrieff which was shown on a 1799 map, and in 1837 a George Reid was recorded as a brick and tile maker. In 1838 the Marquess of Tweeddale tested a tile making machine at this site. It was still recorded on a map in 1853, and in 1867 William Brodie was recorded as a brick and tile manufacturer. It was last recorded in 1915 when the Edinburgh Evening News reported that the farmer G. Sinclair, who had been farming the land, bought the site from Lord Elibank.

The North British Railway, opened in 1846, passes close to Ballencrieff, and there was a short-lived station here from June 1846 to November 1847. The line is still in use as part of the East Coast Main Line.

== See also ==
- List of places in East Lothian
