= Longniddry railway station =

Railway station in East Lothian, Scotland

Longniddry
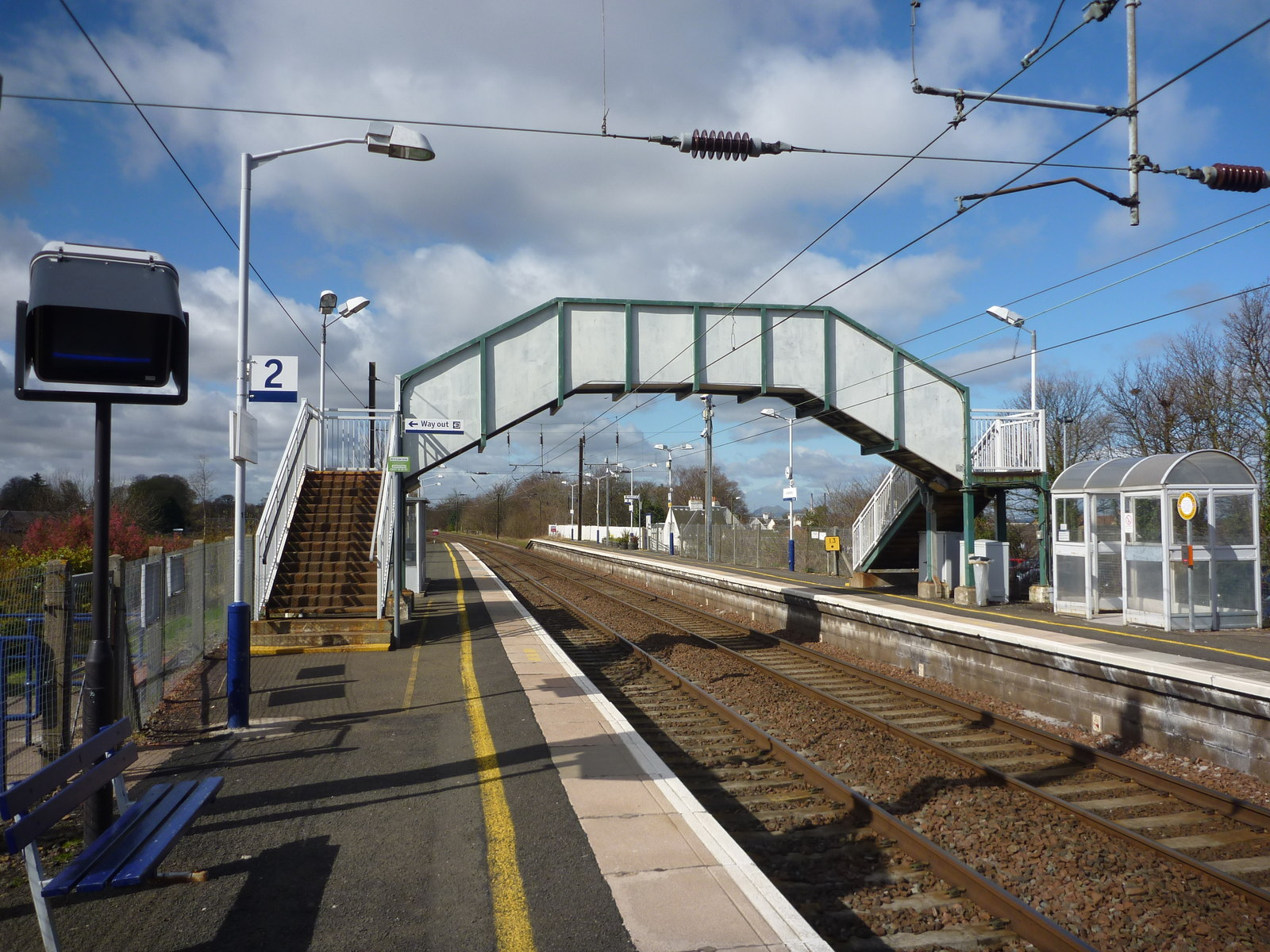

General information
- Location: Longniddry, East Lothian; Scotland
- Coordinates: 55.9763°N 2.8884°W
- Grid reference: NT446762
- Managed by: ScotRail
- Platforms: 2

Other information
- Station code: LND

History
- Original company: North British Railway
- Post-grouping: LNER

Key dates
- 22 June 1846: Opened

Passengers
- 2020/21: ▼18,284
- 2021/22: ▲97,130
- 2022/23: ▲0.138 million
- 2023/24: ▲0.189 million
- 2024/25: ▲0.205 million
Location
Notes
- Passenger statistics from the Office of Rail and Road

Longniddry railway station is located at the southeast corner of the coastal village of Longniddry, East Lothian, Scotland. The station is on the East Coast Main Line, 13 1/4 miles (21.3 km) east of Edinburgh Waverley, and is served by stopping passenger trains on the North Berwick Line.

== History ==
The main line between Edinburgh and Berwick-upon-Tweed was opened by the North British Railway on 22 June 1846, with Longniddry station and the branch line to Haddington opening on the same date. Longniddry's importance as a junction station increased in 1898 with the opening of the Gullane branch.

There were originally three platforms, the Up (eastbound) platform with the main station building, and an island platform serving the Down (westbound) main line and the Haddington branch, which diverged immediately to the east of the station and ran parallel to the main lines for some distance before curving off to the south on an embankment. The branch was originally built as double track, but was singled in 1856. Between the Down line and the Haddington branch east of the station were two long trailing sidings known as Blawearie Sidings which were used for storing rolling stock. On the south side of the branch was a two road engine shed and the Harelaw Lime Works siding. On the Up side, east of the station, was the goods yard containing a goods shed and three trailing sidings. At the west end of the station the branch platform line continued as a 160 yd (150 m) siding (headshunt) on the Down side, whilst further west was a short trailing siding on the Up side, known as Longniddry West Siding. The latter was also known as 'Manure Siding' or 'the dung lye', as it was used to receive wagons loaded with horse dung collected from the streets of Edinburgh and sent to Longniddry for sale as agricultural fertiliser. Longniddry signal box was located at the east end of the Down platform. The junction of the Gullane branch was at Spittal (Aberlady Junction), 1.5 miles (2.4 km) to the east.

Retrenchment during the Twentieth Century saw passenger services withdrawn from the Gullane and Haddington branch lines on 12 September 1932 and 5 December 1949 respectively. On 15 June 1964 the Gullane branch closed to all traffic, followed by closure of Longniddry goods yard on 28 December 1964 and the Haddington branch on 30 March 1968. The locomotive shed had closed in 1964, and following the demise of the Haddington branch the signal box was closed on 8 September 1968 and all sidings removed. The former goods yard site was redeveloped as the new station car park, while the waiting rooms and canopy on the Down platform were removed in the late 1960s and replaced with bus-stop type shelters. Closure of the North Berwick branch and of Drem, Longniddry and Prestonpans stations was proposed in 1969, but not approved by the Minister of Transport. Nonetheless, stopping passenger services were drastically reduced from 1970, and their future was again in doubt following the publication of the Serpell Report in 1982. However, the number of local trains had gradually recovered from the low of the 1970s and by the end of the 1980s the service was once again hourly.

'Pay train' operation began east of Edinburgh on 27 May 1985, at which point the station became unstaffed. The main station building and ticket office (a single storey stone building with a flat-roofed extension) was demolished in 1986/87, at which time the platforms were extended to the east and cut back at the western ends, and the station footbridge was replaced. This work was a prelude to electrification of the East Coast Main Line by British Rail, with most North Berwick line trains being electrically powered from 8 July 1991.

One minor landmark of which little is known save for its ingenuity and efficiency was a mailbag switch device still in use in the 1970s. It was located on the trackside some 160 yards (150 m) west of the station, and mailbags previously loaded on the device's arm could be captured at speed by a matching mechanism on passing southbound express trains which therefore did not need to stop.

== Services ==
All trains calling at Longniddry are operated by ScotRail. Long-distance passenger trains operated by CrossCountry and London North Eastern Railway pass through Longniddry non-stop, as do freight trains.

=== 2007/08 ===
- Monday - Friday - Hourly from Edinburgh to North Berwick and return, with a half-hour frequency at peak times. Certain trains continued beyond Edinburgh to Glasgow Central.
- Saturdays - Half-hourly throughout the day until early evening, reducing to hourly.
- Sundays - Hourly

=== 2008/09 ===
- Monday - Friday - Hourly from Edinburgh to North Berwick and return, with a half-hour frequency at peak times. Certain trains continue beyond Edinburgh to Glasgow Central via Carstairs.
- Saturdays - Half-hourly throughout the day until early evening, reducing to hourly.
- Sundays - Hourly

=== 2018/19 ===
- Monday - Saturday - Either 2tph to Edinburgh and 1tph to North Berwick or 2tph to North Berwick and 1tph to Edinburgh with some peak services extending to Glasgow or Ayr
- Sundays - Hourly

=== Routings ===
Preceding station	National Rail	Following station
Drem	ScotRail; North Berwick Line	Prestonpans
	Historical railways	
Ballencrieff; Line open; Station closed	North British Railway; NBR Main Line	Seton Mains Halt; Line open; Station closed
Aberlady; Line and Station closed	North British Railway; Aberlady, Gullane and North Berwick Railway	Terminus
Haddington; Line and Station closed	North British Railway; Haddington branch	Terminus
