= Haddington railway station =

Railway station in East Lothian, Scotland

Haddington

General information
- Location: Haddington, East Lothian; Scotland
- Coordinates: 55.956126°N 2.7901794°W
- Grid reference: NT507739
- Platforms: 1

Other information
- Status: Disused

History
- Original company: North British Railway
- Pre-grouping: North British Railway
- Post-grouping: London and North Eastern Railway

Key dates
- 22 June 1846: Station opened
- 5 December 1949: Station closed (passengers)
- 2 February 1968: Station closed (freight)
Location

Haddington railway station served the town of Haddington, Scotland. Services were provided by trains on the Haddington line.

== History ==
The station was opened by the North British Railway in 1846. The line passed on to the London and North Eastern Railway in 1923 and finally the Scottish Region of British Railways on nationalisation in 1948. The station was closed to passengers in 1949 and to freight in 1968.

== Future ==
The majority of the former branch line was acquired by East Lothian District Council in 1978 and converted into a railway walk and cycleway. Local campaign group, RAGES (Rail Action Group East of Scotland) have long-term ambitions to reintroduce rail services to Haddington.

Preceding station	Historical railways	Following station
Longniddry	North British Railway; Haddington line	Terminus
