= Ballencrieff railway station =

Disused railway station in Ballencrieff, East Lothian

Coordinates: 55.5591°N 2.8280°W

Ballencrieff

General information
- Location: Ballencrieff, East Lothian; Scotland

Other information
- Status: Disused

History
- Original company: North British Railway
- Pre-grouping: North British Railway

Key dates
- 22 June 1846: Opened
- 1 November 1847: Closed

Ballencrieff railway station served the community of Ballencrieff, East Lothian, Scotland from 1846 to 1847 on the North British Railway Main Line.

== History ==
The station opened on 22 June 1846 by the North British Railway. It was probably situated north of Ballencrieff Farm. There was a siding to the south which outlasted the station, being removed in 1959. The station was very short-lived, closing 15 months later on 1 November 1847.

Preceding station	Historical railways	Following station
Longniddry	North British Railway; North British Railway Main Line	Drem
