= North Berwick railway station =

Railway station in East Lothian, Scotland

North Berwick Scottish Gaelic: Bearaig a Tuath
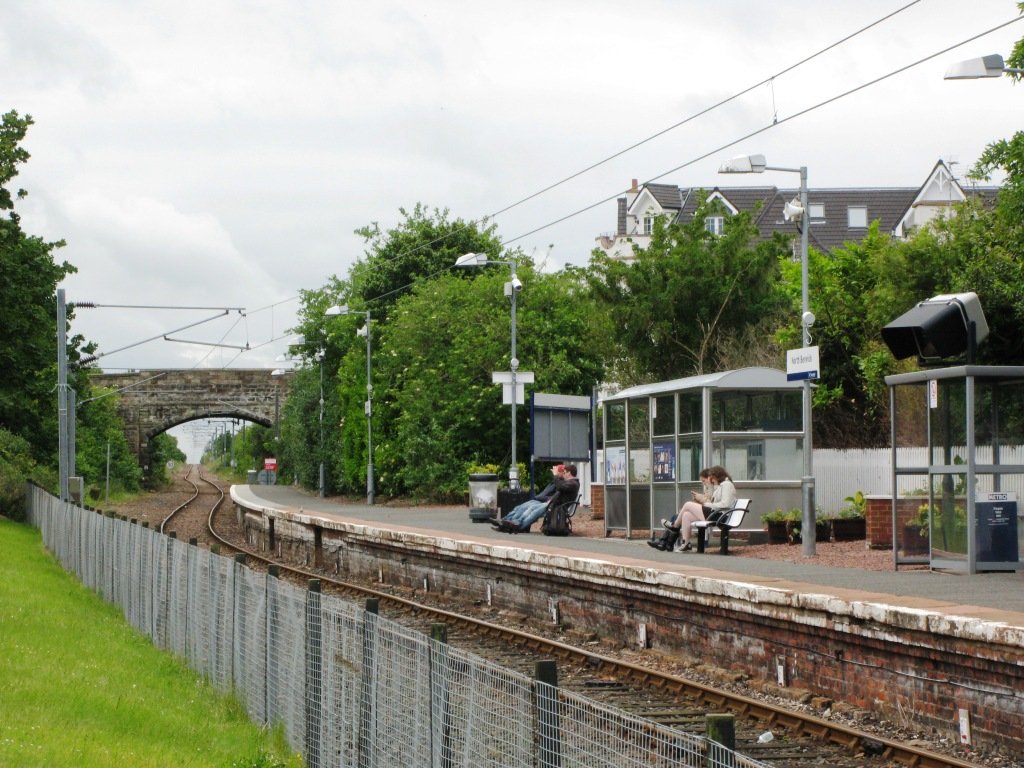
- North Berwick station

General information
- Location: North Berwick, East Lothian, Scotland
- Coordinates: 56.0566°N 2.7310°W
- Grid reference: NT546851
- Managed by: ScotRail
- Platforms: 1

Other information
- Station code: NBW
- Classification: DfT category F1

History
- Original company: North British Railway
- Post-grouping: London and North Eastern Railway

Key dates
- 17 June 1850: Opened

Passengers
- 2020/21: ▼86,264
- 2021/22: ▲0.344 million
- 2022/23: ▲0.461 million
- 2023/24: ▲0.560 million
- 2024/25: ▲0.566 million
Location
Notes
- Passenger statistics from the Office of Rail and Road

North Berwick railway station serves the seaside town of North Berwick, in East Lothian, Scotland. It is the northern terminus of the North Berwick Line, 22 1/4 miles (35.8 km) east of Edinburgh Waverley.

== History ==
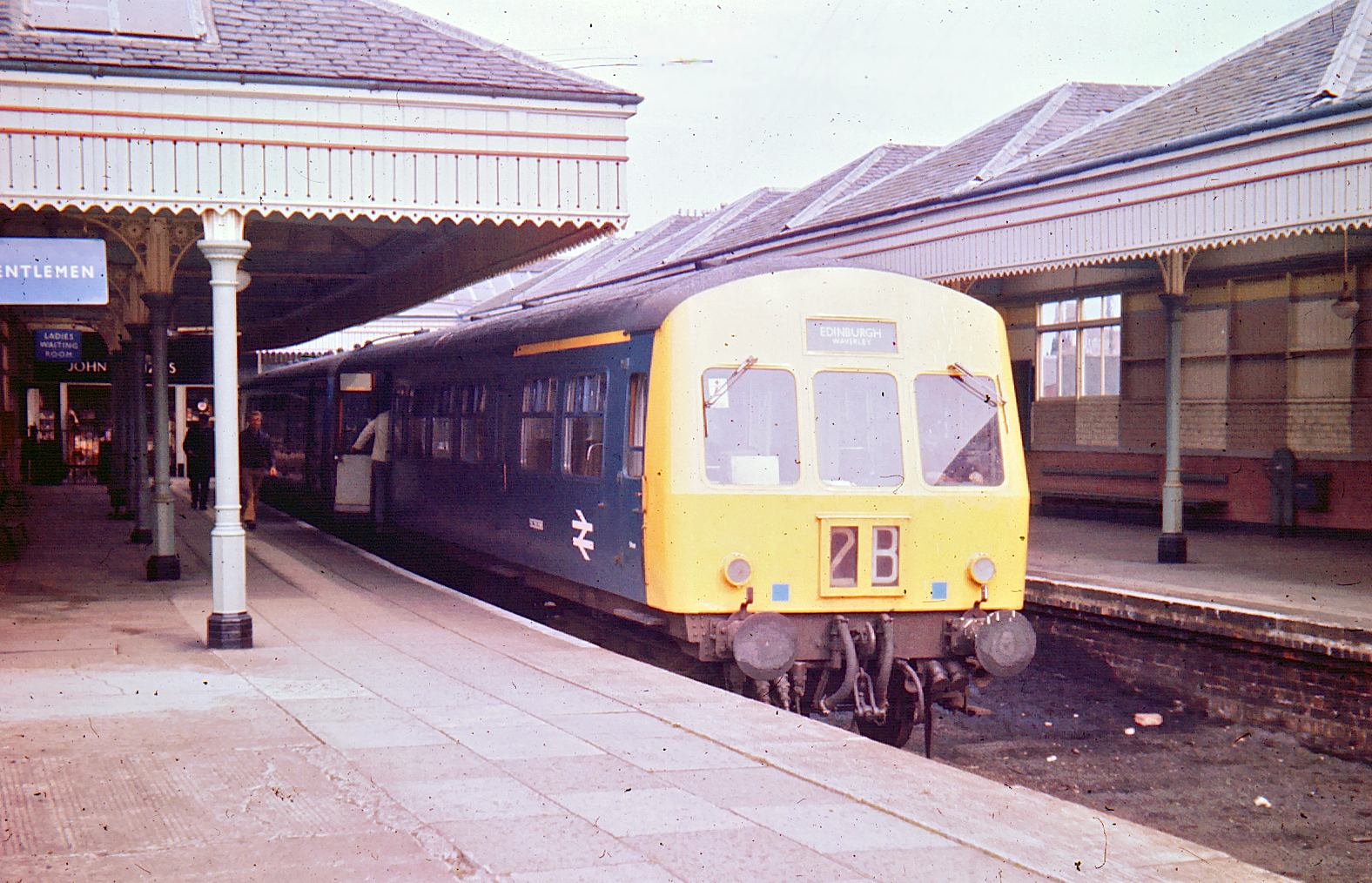
The extensive station facilities (April 1974)

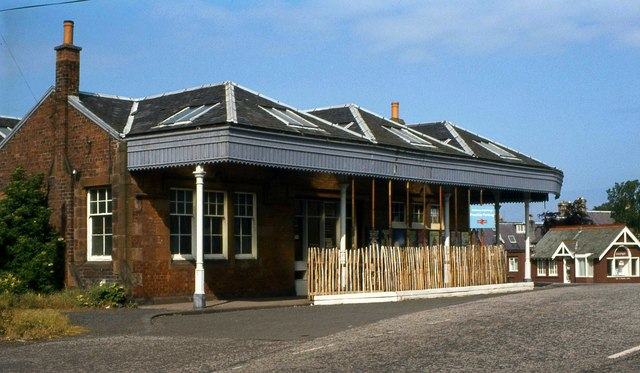
The old station building was demolished in 1985

Albert Edward, Prince of Wales (the future King Edward VII) visited North Berwick in 1859, arriving by train. By this time the town was increasingly favoured as a resort for the wealthy, and the royal visit helped to boost its popularity. To encourage tourism, a large new hotel (the Royal Hotel) was built opposite the station, with the railway company being a shareholder in this venture until 1923. The growth of the town during the Victorian era resulted in increased business for the railway and, in 1894, the station was enlarged to cope with the traffic.

Following the rebuilding, the station complex featured two terminus platforms, which extended right up to Station Road. To the south of the station was a goods yard, with ten sidings and a goods shed. One of the sidings originally extended across Station Road onto a high embankment, between Abbey Road and Station Hill, in order to serve the gasworks at the foot of Station Hill (this embankment was the only part of the harbour line to be completed).

A two-road dead-ended engine shed was located on the north of the line, with its back against the Ware Road overbridge, while the signalbox was located on the south side of the line opposite the shed. West of Ware Road was a headshunt siding on the north side of the line. In 1904, a replacement gasworks was built at Ferrygate, with two sidings on the north side of the line facing towards North Berwick.

Two camping coaches were positioned here by the Scottish Region from 1960 to 1966; they were Pullman coaches from 1961 to 1965.

There was a proposal by the Aberlady, Gullane and North Berwick Railway to build a second route to North Berwick from Longniddry; however, that line was only completed as far as Gullane.

In the days of steam locomotives, many of the North Berwick branch passenger trains terminated at Drem; passengers had to change onto main line stopping services to continue their journeys.

=== Dieselisation ===
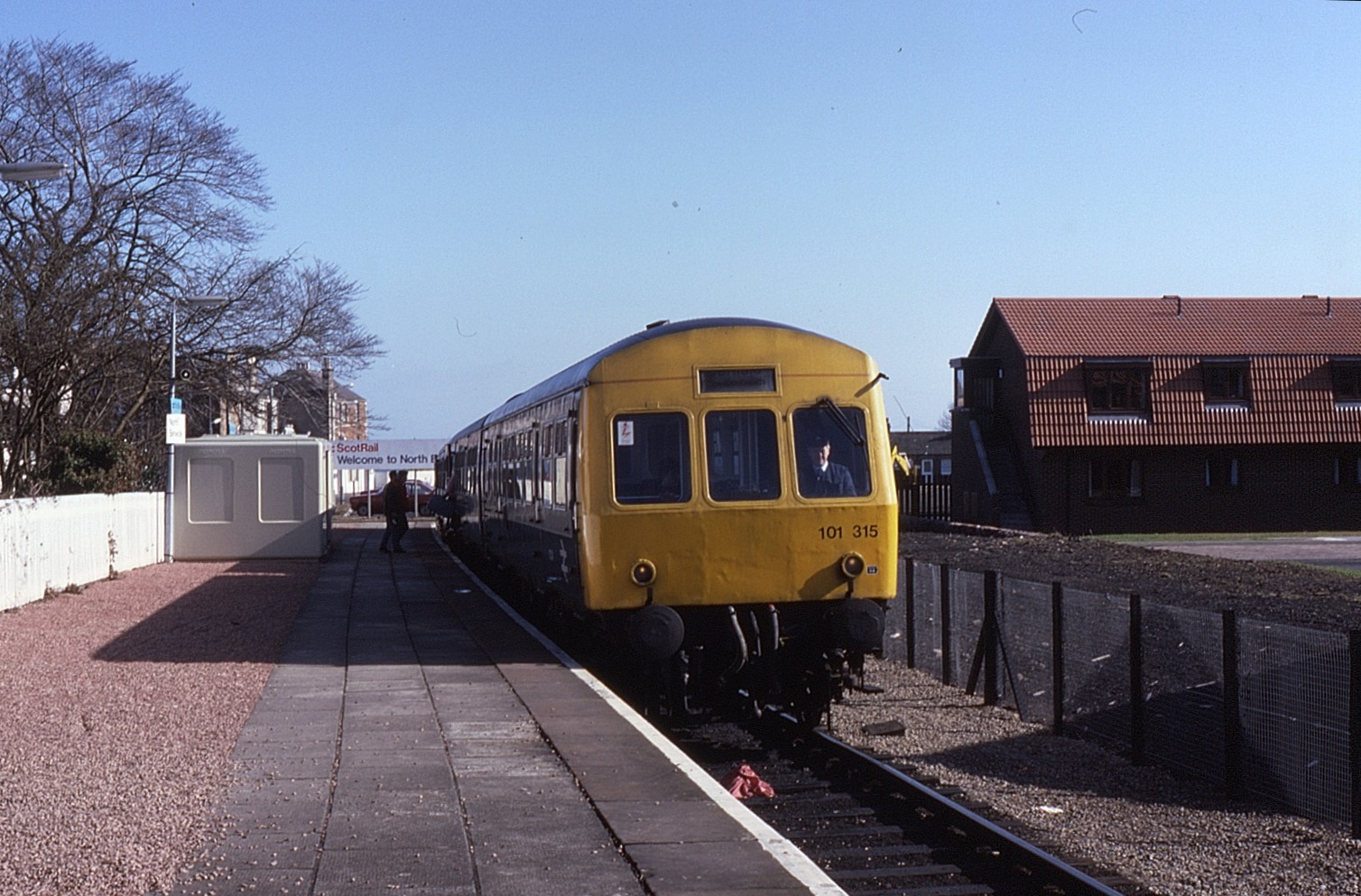
A Class 101 DMU at North Berwick on 29 March 1986

In 1958, diesel multiple units (DMUs) were introduced on the North Berwick services and most branch trains then ran right through to Edinburgh Waverley or Corstorphine. With the arrival of the diesels, the engine shed was closed.

Despite the improvement to passenger services upon dieselisation, a period of decline had already begun. The intermediate station at Dirleton had closed to passengers on 1 February 1954 and its use for goods traffic ended on 1 June 1959. Nationally, the railways were suffering as a result of increased car ownership and competition from road haulage. The gasworks, formerly a major customer, ceased to receive coal deliveries in the 1960s and North Berwick goods yard closed on 1 January 1968. The signalbox closed one week later, at which time all tracks were removed except that leading to the secondary (north) platform.

=== Threats of the line's closure ===
The late '60s were the period of the infamous 'Beeching Axe'; British Rail sought permission to close the branch line altogether, along with all local stations east of Edinburgh. Although the Minister of Transport refused permission for these closures, a drastic cut in service was implemented. When the new timetable was introduced on 4 January 1970, the weekday service consisted of just two morning and two evening peak hour trains. This period represented the nadir of the station's fortunes, with a skeleton service and most of the station complex derelict.

The passenger service gradually recovered, despite a further threat to the station's future following publication of the Serpell Report in 1982. However, in 1985, the grand but decaying station buildings were demolished and the remaining platform was shortened. A new station car park was built, on the site of the old station buildings and platforms, while the goods yard site was sold for housing development. The 'new' station was unstaffed and 'pay trains' were introduced between Edinburgh and North Berwick on 27 May.

Although the loss of the old station buildings was lamented by many local people, the reduction in operating costs and the provision of a park-and-ride car park contributed to the revitalisation of the line. By the end of the 1980s the service was once again operating on an hourly frequency.

=== Electrification of the branch ===
Electrification of the branch line in the early 1990s by British Rail in tandem with 25 kV AC electrification of the East Coast Main Line showed a renewed confidence in the long-term future of the station. Regular electric services began on 8 July 1991 and passenger numbers have continued to grow steadily since.

== Facilities ==
The station is unstaffed; self-service ticket machines are provided. Train running information is provided by manual announcements, digital customer information system displays, a help point and timetable posters. There is a car park, with 96 spaces.

== Services ==
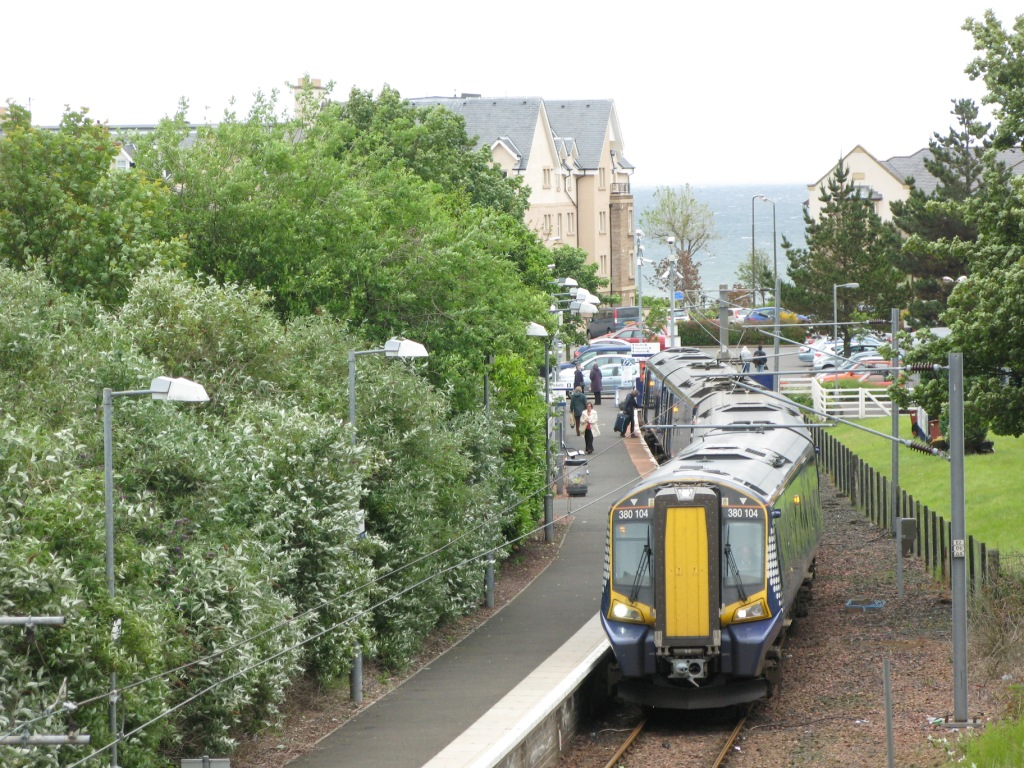
A Class 380 electric multiple unit at the station; these trains operated most services from their introduction in 2011 until 2018, when two-thirds of services began to be operated by the newer Class 385s

ScotRail operates an hourly all-stations service to Edinburgh Waverley, with additional trains at peak hours including one morning service to Haymarket.

Previously, through services operated to Glasgow Central and Ayr, via Carstairs and Motherwell; however, these were withdrawn in 2019.

Preceding station	National Rail	Following station
Terminus	ScotRail; North Berwick Branch	Drem
	Historical railways	
Terminus	North British Railway; North Berwick Branch	Williamstown (East Lothian); Line open, station closed
