= Dirleton railway station =

Former railway station in Scotland

Dirleton
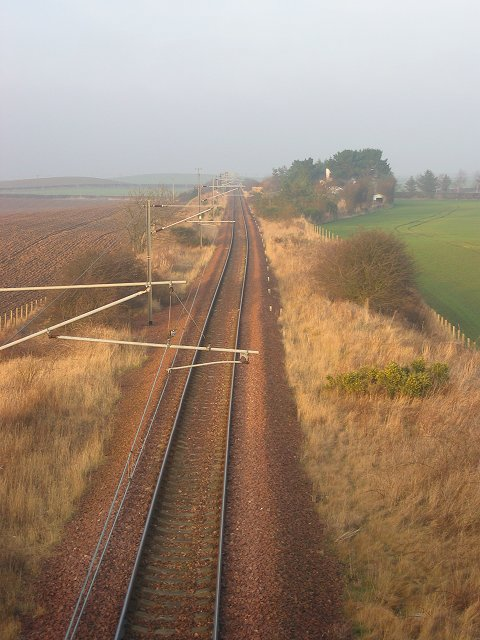
- The building in the trees was once Dirleton Station.

General information
- Location: North Berwick, East Lothian; Scotland
- Coordinates: 56.03489°N 2.75905°W
- Platforms: 1

Other information
- Status: Disused

History
- Original company: North British Railway
- Post-grouping: LNER

Key dates
- 17 June 1850: Opened
- 1 February 1954: Closed
Location

Dirleton railway station was a railway station on the North Berwick Branch of the North British Railway in East Lothian, Scotland. It was an intermediate station on the branch line from Drem.

== History ==
Dirleton station was a small station with a single platform and two sidings on the south side of the line. There was no signalbox, and the siding points were controlled by a ground frame.

Dirleton station closed to passengers on 1 February 1954, with the goods yard surviving as an unstaffed public siding until 1 June 1959. The station house is now privately owned, and the station site is clearly visible from passing trains.

Although named for the village of Dirleton, the station was actually some distance away, approximately halfway between Dirleton and Kingston. A plan to give Direlton a more convenient station was put forward by the Aberlady, Gullane and North Berwick Railway, which was founded in 1893. This company opened its line from Spittal (Aberlady Junction) near Longniddry to Gullane in 1898, but plans to extend it to join the North Berwick branch near Williamstown were never implemented.

== Previous services ==
Preceding station	Historical railways	Following station
Williamstown; Line open; Station closed	North British Railway; North Berwick Branch	Drem; Line and Station open

== Sources ==
- Butt, R. V. J. (October 1995). The Directory of Railway Stations: details every public and private passenger station, halt, platform and stopping place, past and present (1st ed.). Sparkford: Patrick Stephens Ltd. ISBN 978-1-85260-508-7. OCLC 60251199. OL 11956311M.
- Hajducki, Andrew M. (1992) The North Berwick and Gullane Branch Lines, Headington, Oakwood Press, ISBN 0-85361-427-X
- Jowett, Alan (March 1989). Jowett's Railway Atlas of Great Britain and Ireland: From Pre-Grouping to the Present Day (1st ed.). Sparkford: Patrick Stephens Ltd. ISBN 978-1-85260-086-0. OCLC 22311137.
