= Seton Mains Halt railway station =

Former railway station in Scotland

Seton Mains

General information
- Location: Seton Sands, East Lothian; Scotland
- Coordinates: 55.9632°N 2.9343°W
- Platforms: 2

Other information
- Status: Disused

History
- Original company: North British Railway
- Pre-grouping: North British Railway
- Post-grouping: London and North Eastern Railway

Key dates
- 1 May 1914: Station opened
- 22 September 1930: Station closed
Location

Seton Mains Halt was a railway halt of the North British Railway, located between the current Prestonpans and Longniddry railway stations, opposite Seton Gardens/Entrance to Seton Castle. The signal box and halt have been demolished. It had a booking office and a platform.

== Routes ==
Preceding station	Historical railways	Following station
Prestonpans; Line open; Station open	North British Railway; NBR Main Line	Longniddry; Line open; Station open
