= Drem railway station =

Railway station in East Lothian, Scotland

Drem Scottish Gaelic: An Druim
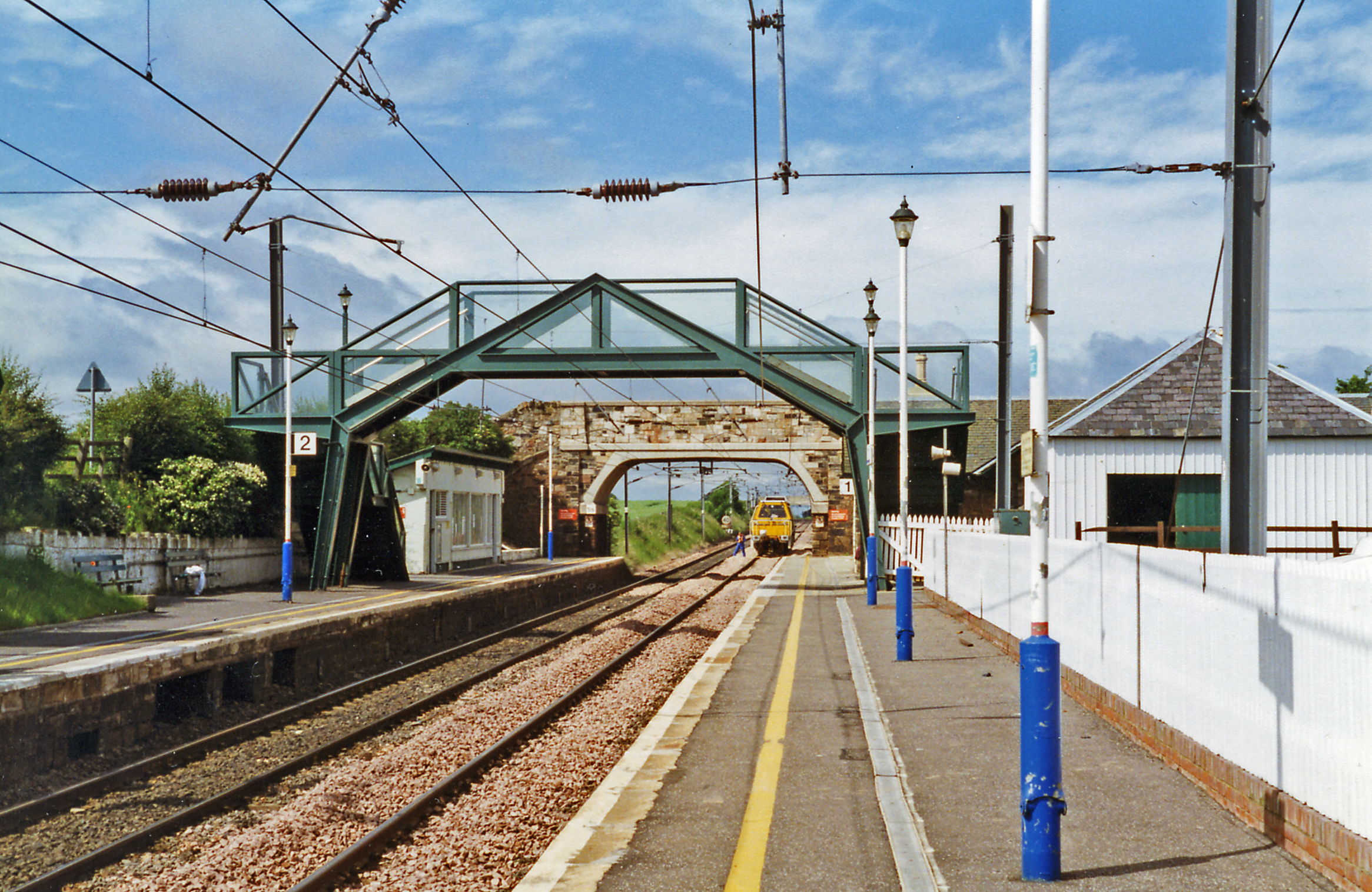

General information
- Location: Drem, East Lothian; Scotland
- Coordinates: 56.0051°N 2.7854°W
- Grid reference: NT510793
- Managed by: ScotRail
- Platforms: 2

Other information
- Station code: DRM

History
- Original company: North British Railway
- Post-grouping: LNER

Key dates
- 22 June 1846: Opened

Passengers
- 2020/21: ▼14,130
- 2021/22: ▲61,428
- 2022/23: ▲0.103 million
- 2023/24: ▼99,466
- 2024/25: ▲0.153 million
Location
Notes
- Passenger statistics from the Office of Rail and Road

Drem railway station serves the small village of Drem in East Lothian, 5 miles (8 km) from the seaside town of North Berwick in Scotland. It is located on the East Coast Main Line (ECML) 18 miles (29 km) east of Edinburgh Waverley. Passenger services are provided on the ScotRail North Berwick Line, and the junction where the North Berwick branch diverges from the ECML is a short distance to the east of the station.

== History ==
The station was opened by the North British Railway on 22 June 1846, on the same date as the main line from Edinburgh to Berwick-upon-Tweed. The short branch towards North Berwick was opened by the NBR on 13 August 1849, making the station a junction of some importance. The earthworks and bridges on the North Berwick line were built to accommodate double track, but only one track was ever laid and in its early years the line was not particularly successful. In 1856–57 the NBR attempted to cut costs by operating most of the branch passenger trains with horse traction. The horse-drawn carriage used, known as the 'Dandy Car', had originally been built for the NBR's Portobello to Leith branch, and was later used on the Port Carlisle branch. It is now in the National Railway Museum at York.

When the main line opened there was a small station at Ballencrieff to the west of Drem, but this was very short-lived and closed to passengers on 1 November 1847. There was also an intermediate station on the North Berwick branch at Dirleton, which lasted until 1 February 1954.

Drem station consists of two platforms, with the main buildings being situated on the Up (eastbound) platform. At the west end of the station is an overbridge carrying a minor road to Athelstaneford. Both platforms originally extended further west through this bridge. The signal box was situated on the Down (westbound) side of the line immediately to the east of the station, opposite the original point of divergence of the North Berwick branch. There were trailing refuge sidings on the Up line west of the station and on the Down line to the east of it, whilst the station goods yard with a goods shed and five sidings was on the Up side east of the station.

In the days of steam locomotives, many of the North Berwick branch trains terminated at Drem and passengers had to change onto main line stopping services to continue their journeys. In 1958, diesel multiple units were introduced on the North Berwick services and most branch trains then ran right through to Edinburgh Waverley or Corstorphine. Some main line stopping services continued to be steam hauled until 4 May 1964, when they were largely discontinued (Inveresk, East Fortune and East Linton stations closing on that date). Thereafter, all North Berwick trains ran through to Edinburgh or beyond. A few peak-hour stopping trains from Edinburgh to Dunbar continued to operate until around 1990.

The Beeching Axe almost claimed Drem in 1968 when British Rail applied to close the branch, along with North Berwick, Drem, Longniddry and Prestonpans stations. This request was refused by the Minister of Transport on 19 September 1969, but from 4 January 1970 the local trains were reduced to a skeleton service. During the 1970s Eastern Scottish ran a feeder bus between East Linton and Drem for commuters, but this was not to last.

Local goods services also declined, starting with Ballencrieff Siding (closing on 1 June 1959), followed by Dirleton Siding (1 June 1964) and North Berwick goods yard (1 January 1968). Drem goods yard then served as a central goods facility for much of East Lothian, lasting until 6 August 1979.

Drem signal box closed on 21 November 1977, when new signalling controlled from Edinburgh was commissioned. The track was remodelled such that the old Down Refuge siding became a refuge loop, whilst the junction of the North Berwick branch was moved further east, with the original branch track becoming an Up Refuge loop (replacing the old Up Refuge siding west of the station). One siding in the old goods yard was retained for use by engineering trains and the rest of the yard was redeveloped as the station car park.

== Electrification ==
Passenger services gradually recovered from their nadir in the 1970s, and by the late 1980s an hourly service to North Berwick had been restored. With the introduction of 'pay trains' on 27 May 1985, the station became unstaffed, and BR quickly moved to demolish the buildings. Contractors demolished the waiting room on the Down (Edinburgh) platform, but as the station was a Listed building the work was stopped and BR were required to construct a replica – the current waiting room is built to the original NBR design. The East Coast Main Line was electrified in 1990, and regular electric services on the branch began on 8 July 1991 under British Rail.

There is a local campaign to reopen East Linton station and to resume main line stopping services between Edinburgh and Dunbar, which would also serve Drem. This campaign was successful, with East Linton opening to traffic in December 2023.

== Services ==
The station receives an hourly service between Edinburgh and North Berwick, with some extra services in the peak hours, with one service each way being extended to Haymarket between Monday and Friday. One train a day to and from Dunbar also stops at the station.

On Sundays, the service remains as hourly however starts from 10:00 rather than 06:00. The final train towards North Berwick (at 23:40) is for setting down only, so the last train to North Berwick for passengers at Drem is at 22:00.

Main line trains operated by CrossCountry and London North Eastern Railway pass through the station but do not stop, and the main line is also used by freight trains.

Preceding station	National Rail	Following station
North Berwick	ScotRail; East Coast Main Line	Longniddry
	Historical railways	
East Fortune; Line open; Station closed	North British Railway; NBR Main Line	Ballencrieff; Line open; Station closed
Dirleton; Line open; Station closed	North British Railway; North Berwick Branch	Junction with NBR Main Line

== Gallery ==
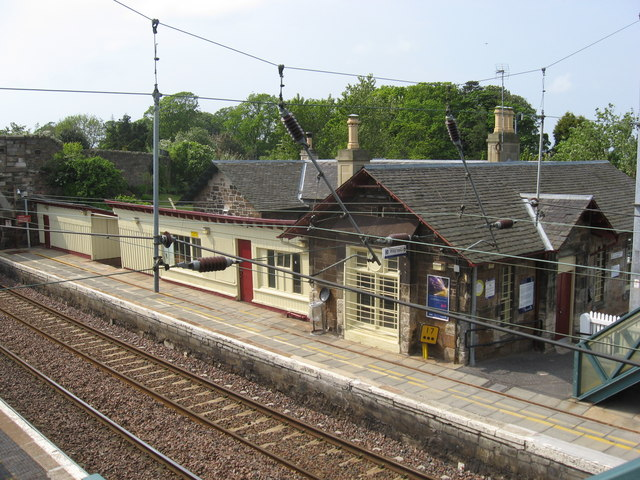
The ticket office

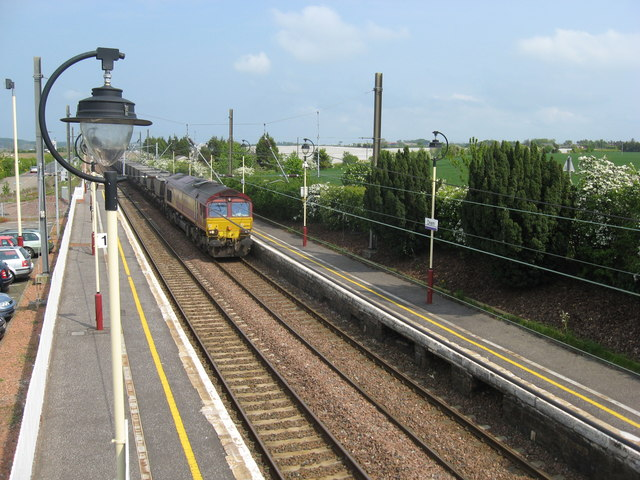
View looking east, with empty coal wagons passing through

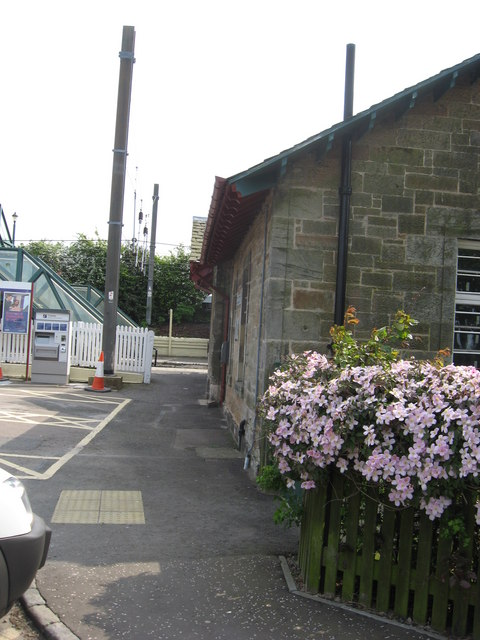
The former stationmaster's house

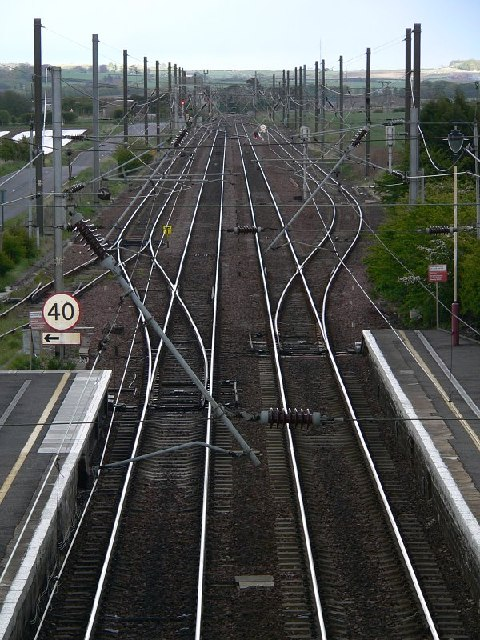
View from the railway station bridge, looking towards where the branch line to North Berwick diverges

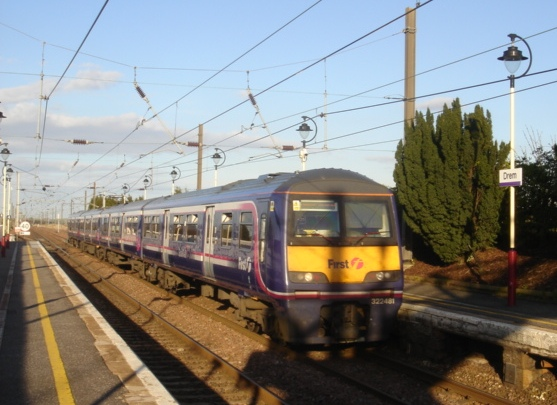
A Class 322 arriving from North Berwick with a service to Edinburgh
