= Drem =

Coordinates: 56.006°N 2.787°W

Drem: Scottish Gaelic: An Druim
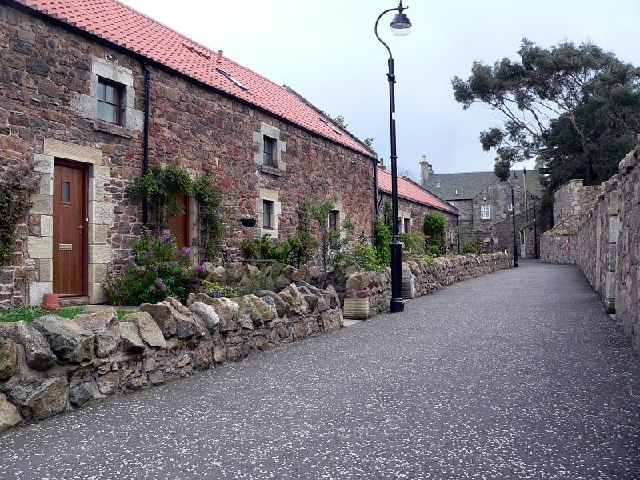
- Old farm buildings and cottages brought back to life as expensive houses

- Location within Scotland
- OS grid reference: NT510795
- Civil parish: Athelstaneford
- Council area: East Lothian Council
- Lieutenancy area: East Lothian
- Country: Scotland
- Sovereign state: United Kingdom
- Post town: NORTH BERWICK
- Postcode district: EH39
- Dialling code: 01620
- Police: Scotland
- Fire: Scottish
- Ambulance: Scottish
- UK Parliament: East Lothian
- Scottish Parliament: East Lothian

Drem is a small village in East Lothian, Scotland.

It is approximately 20 miles (32 km) east of Edinburgh and is close to Haddington (to the south), North Berwick (northeast), Dirleton (north) and Gullane (north west). It has a railway station on the Edinburgh to North Berwick line with hourly service between those points and occasional service to Glasgow. The station is the last before the single track North Berwick line branches off the East Coast Main Line.

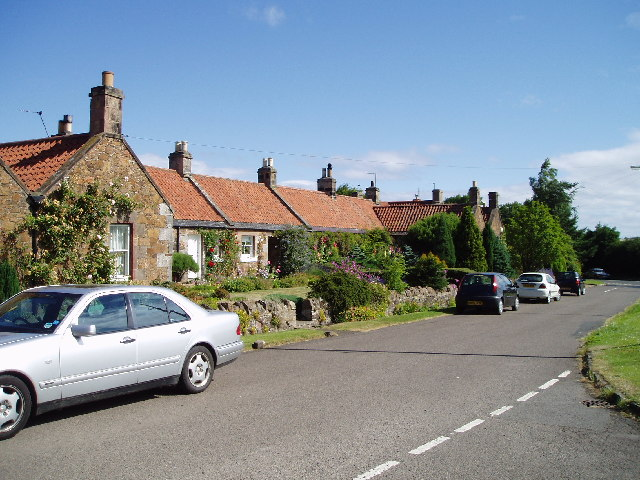
Drem Cottages

During World War II, the former West Fenton Aerodrome (later Gullane Aerodrome) became RAF Drem and the Drem Lighting System was developed to assist Spitfire landing. The disused airfield buildings were used to construct components of the Forth Road Bridge.

Today some of the outbuildings have become part of the Fenton Barns retail and leisure village and are used as studios by local craftspeople, particularly furniture makers.

Chesters Hill Fort, 1 mile (1.6 km) south of the village, is an example of an Iron Age fort.

== See also ==
- List of places in East Lothian
