= Grade I listed buildings in Redcar and Cleveland =

There are over 9,000 Grade I listed buildings in England. This page is a list of these buildings in the district of Redcar and Cleveland in North Yorkshire.

== Redcar and Cleveland ==
| Name | Location | Type | Completed (Note: The date given is the date used by Historic England as significant for the initial building or that of an important part in the structure's description.) | Date designated | Grid ref. (Note: The grid reference is based on the British national grid reference system, sometimes known as OSGB36, used by the Ordnance Survey.) Geo-coordinates | Entry number (Note: The "List Entry Number" is a unique number assigned to each listed building and scheduled monument by Historic England.) | Image |
|---|---|---|---|---|---|---|---|
| Priory Dovecote, to West of St Mary's Priory Ruins | Guisborough | Dovecote | 14th century | 14 June 1952 | NZ6160416031; 54°32′09″N 1°02′58″W | 1139766 | Priory Dovecote, to West of St Mary's Priory Ruins More images |
| St Mary's Priory gatehouse | Guisborough | Gatehouse | Late 12th century | 14 June 1952 | NZ6160016092; 54°32′11″N 1°02′58″W | 1139765 | St Mary's Priory gatehouse More images |
| St Mary's Priory Ruins | Guisborough | Priory | Late C118 | 14 June 1952 | NZ6174816091; 54°32′11″N 1°02′50″W | 1329543 | St Mary's Priory Ruins More images |
| Kilton Castle | Kilton, Lockwood | Castle | 12th century | 25 May 1966 | NZ7028617572; 54°32′55″N 0°54′54″W | 1136489 | Kilton Castle More images |
| Marske Hall | Marske-by-the-Sea, Saltburn, Marske and New Marske | Country House | 1625 | 13 April 1967 | NZ6329422375; 54°35′33″N 1°01′19″W | 1387553 | Marske Hall More images |
| Skelton Castle | Skelton-in-Cleveland, Skelton and Brotton | Castle | Medieval remains | 25 May 1966 | NZ6517819321; 54°33′54″N 0°59′37″W | 1262832 | Skelton Castle More images |
| Stable block, stable house and coach house, 200 metres south east of Skelton Castle | Skelton-in-Cleveland, Skelton and Brotton | House | 1897 | 25 May 1966 | NZ6527819100; 54°33′47″N 0°59′31″W | 1250412 | Upload Photo |
| Church of St Cuthbert | Kirkleatham | Statue | 1688 | 23 June 1952 | NZ5940621818; 54°35′17″N 1°04′56″W | 1139638 | Church of St Cuthbert More images |
| Entrance Screen Loggias Forts Flat and Outhouses to Sir William Turner's Hospital | Kirkleatham | Apartment | Late 18th century | 29 April 1988 | NZ5927421598; 54°35′10″N 1°05′04″W | 1329606 | Entrance Screen Loggias Forts Flat and Outhouses to Sir William Turner's Hospital More images |
| Gatepiers at Entrance to Drive of Kirkleatham Hall School | Kirkleatham | Gate Pier | Mid 18th century | 14 June 1952 | NZ5945021841; 54°35′18″N 1°04′54″W | 1310744 | Gatepiers at Entrance to Drive of Kirkleatham Hall School More images |
| Gatepiers at Entrance to Forecourt of Kirkleatham Hall School | Kirkleatham | Gate Pier | c. 1700 | 14 June 1952 | NZ5950221872; 54°35′19″N 1°04′51″W | 1329607 | Gatepiers at Entrance to Forecourt of Kirkleatham Hall School More images |
| Sir William Turner's Hospital | Kirkleatham | Flats | 1674-1676 | 14 June 1952 | NZ5930721547; 54°35′08″N 1°05′02″W | 1310786 | Sir William Turner's Hospital More images |
| Turner Mausoleum Adjoining Church of St Cuthbert | Kirkleatham | Mausoleum | 1739/40 | 23 June 1952 | NZ5941921831; 54°35′17″N 1°04′55″W | 1159896 | Turner Mausoleum Adjoining Church of St Cuthbert More images |
| Ormesby Hall, adjoining outbuildings and screen walls | Ormesby | House | 18th century | 5 May 1952 | NZ5297416746; 54°32′36″N 1°10′58″W | 1311002 | Ormesby Hall, adjoining outbuildings and screen walls More images |
| Stableblock, Circa 80 Metres North-east of Ormesby Hall | Ormesby | House | Mid 19th century | 5 May 1952 | NZ5301016822; 54°32′38″N 1°10′56″W | 1139662 | Stableblock, Circa 80 Metres North-east of Ormesby Hall More images |
