= Grade II* listed buildings in Redcar and Cleveland =

There are over 20,000 Grade II* listed buildings in England. This page is a list of these buildings in the district of Redcar and Cleveland in North Yorkshire.

== Redcar and Cleveland ==
Name	Location	Type	Completed (Note: The date given is the date used by Historic England as significant for the initial building or that of an important part in the structure's description.)	Date designated	Grid ref. (Note: The grid reference is based on the British national grid reference system, sometimes known as OSGB36, used by the Ordnance Survey.) Geo-coordinates	Entry number (Note: The "List Entry Number" is a unique number assigned to each listed building and scheduled monument by Historic England.)	Image
Church of St Nicholas	Guisborough, Redcar and Cleveland	Church	pre-1086	14 June 1952	NZ6165016118; 54°32′12″N 1°02′55″W	1329545	Church of St Nicholas More images
Church of St Oswald	Newton under Roseberry, Guisborough, Redcar and Cleveland	Church	Earlier than 12th century	25 April 1984	NZ5692413255; 54°30′41″N 1°07′20″W	1139807	Church of St Oswald More images
Estate Office, Former Joiner's Workshop to West of Home Farmhouse	Guisborough, Redcar and Cleveland	Joiners Shop	Mid 19th century	16 May 2001	NZ5952914368; 54°31′16″N 1°04′55″W	1271502	Estate Office, Former Joiner's Workshop to West of Home Farmhouse More images
Old Church of St Andrew	Upleatham, Guisborough, Redcar and Cleveland	Church	12th century	14 June 1952	NZ6371219367; 54°33′56″N 1°00′58″W	1139759	Old Church of St Andrew More images
Stables, Cart Shed, Granary, Barn and Loose Boxes, to East of Home Farmhouse	Hutton Lowcross, Guisborough, Redcar and Cleveland	Barn	1826	25 April 1984	NZ5959314354; 54°31′16″N 1°04′51″W	1159574	Upload Photo
Tocketts Mill	Guisborough, Redcar and Cleveland	Watermill	Earlier than c1810	30 April 1974	NZ6269318108; 54°33′16″N 1°01′56″W	1329554	Tocketts Mill More images
Church of St Michael	Liverton Village, Loftus, Redcar and Cleveland	Church	12th century	20 January 1967	NZ7111216306; 54°32′13″N 0°54′09″W	1139676	Church of St Michael More images
Inclined Tramway (lower Building)	Saltburn, Saltburn, Marske and New Marske, Redcar and Cleveland	Engine House	1884	26 February 1999	NZ6661721707; 54°35′10″N 0°58′15″W	1387519	Inclined Tramway (lower Building)
Inclined Tramway (upper Building)	Saltburn, Saltburn, Marske and New Marske, Redcar and Cleveland	Incline Keepers Cottage	1884	26 February 1999	NZ6659721653; 54°35′09″N 0°58′16″W	1387523	Inclined Tramway (upper Building)
Saltburn Pier	Saltburn, Saltburn, Marske and New Marske, Redcar and Cleveland	Pleasure Pier	1867-1869	20 May 1974	NZ6665621830; 54°35′14″N 0°58′12″W	1387526	Saltburn Pier More images
Saltburn War Memorial	Saltburn, Saltburn, Marske and New Marske, Redcar and Cleveland	War Memorial	1919	26 May 1999	NZ6651221112; 54°34′51″N 0°58′21″W	1387499	Saltburn War Memorial More images
Church of All Saints	Skelton, Skelton and Brotton, Redcar and Cleveland	Church	11th century	25 May 1966	NZ6605818994; 54°33′43″N 0°58′48″W	1250407	Church of All Saints More images
Old Church of All Saints	Skelton, Skelton and Brotton, Redcar and Cleveland	Church	Medieval	25 May 1966	NZ6525219038; 54°33′45″N 0°59′33″W	1263246	Old Church of All Saints More images
Rushpool Hall	Skelton, Skelton and Brotton, Redcar and Cleveland	Bath House	1863	8 October 1975	NZ6654420541; 54°34′33″N 0°58′20″W	1251344	Rushpool Hall More images
Baptist Church	Redcar and Cleveland	Baptist Chapel	1905	29 April 1988	NZ5352420781; 54°34′46″N 1°10′24″W	1160408	Baptist Church More images
Bastion 100 Metres North West of Kirkleatham Hall Farm	Kirkleatham, Redcar and Cleveland	Bastion	Early 18th century	23 June 1952	NZ5943622015; 54°35′23″N 1°04′54″W	1160124	Bastion 100 Metres North West of Kirkleatham Hall Farm More images
Bastion and Adjoining Ha Ha Wall 150 Metres North of Kirkleatham Hall Farm	Kirkleatham, Redcar and Cleveland	Ha Ha	Early 18th century	23 June 1952	NZ5957022077; 54°35′25″N 1°04′47″W	1329608	Bastion and Adjoining Ha Ha Wall 150 Metres North of Kirkleatham Hall Farm More images
Church of St Cuthbert	Wilton, Redcar and Cleveland	Church	12th century	14 June 1952	NZ5830419745; 54°34′10″N 1°05′59″W	1310519	Church of St Cuthbert More images
Gatehouse 120 Metres North East of Kirkleatham Hall Farm	Kirkleatham, Redcar and Cleveland	Gatehouse	c. 1780	23 June 1952	NZ5960422006; 54°35′23″N 1°04′45″W	1160114	Gatehouse 120 Metres North East of Kirkleatham Hall Farm More images
Kirkleatham Hall Farm	Kirkleatham, Redcar and Cleveland	Tack Room	c. 1800	23 June 1952	NZ5952821919; 54°35′20″N 1°04′49″W	1160085	Kirkleatham Hall Farm More images
Listening Post 330 Metres of Wheatlands Farmhouse	Redcar and Cleveland	Wall	c. 1916	13 May 1986	NZ6148222954; 54°35′53″N 1°03′00″W	1160275	Listening Post 330 Metres of Wheatlands Farmhouse More images
Manor House	Redcar and Cleveland	House	c. 1716	22 June 1967	NZ5447518295; 54°33′25″N 1°09′33″W	1310999	Manor House More images
Old Hall Farmhouse and Garden Wall	Lackenby, Redcar and Cleveland	Farmhouse	Mid 17th century	29 April 1988	NZ5650319397; 54°34′00″N 1°07′39″W	1139659	Old Hall Farmhouse and Garden Wall More images
Old Hall Museum	Kirkleatham, Redcar and Cleveland	School	18th century	14 June 1952	NZ5922321637; 54°35′11″N 1°05′06″W	1139641	Old Hall Museum More images
Red Barns House and Red Barns Hotel	Redcar and Cleveland	House	1868-70	29 April 1988	NZ5966824923; 54°36′57″N 1°04′39″W	1139613	Red Barns House and Red Barns Hotel More images
Statue of Justice in Courtyard of Sir William Turner's Hospital	Kirkleatham, Redcar and Cleveland	Statue	c. 1720	29 April 1988	NZ5930521580; 54°35′09″N 1°05′02″W	1310769	Statue of Justice in Courtyard of Sir William Turner's Hospital
West Lodges with Gates Gatepiers and Flanking Walls	Redcar and Cleveland	Gate	Mid 18th century	5 May 1952	NZ5209916911; 54°32′41″N 1°11′46″W	1329638	West Lodges with Gates Gatepiers and Flanking Walls More images
