= Allan Codling =

English footballer

Personal information
- Full name: Allan Codling
- Date of birth: 24 February 1911
- Place of birth: Guisborough, Yorkshire, England
- Date of death: 1991 (aged 79–80) (Note: Codling's death was registered in February 1991, in the East Cleveland registration district, which covered Guisborough, Lockwood, Loftus, Saltburn, Marske and New Marske, and Skelton and Brotton.)
- Place of death: East Cleveland, England
- Height: 5 ft 8 1/2 in (1.74 m)
- Position: Outside left

Senior career*
Years	Team	Apps	(Gls)
–	Whitby United		
193?–1933	Bolton Wanderers	0	(0)
1933	Hartlepools United	0	(0)
1933–193?	Scarborough		
1934–1935	Gresley Rovers		
1935–1936	Folkestone		
1936–1938	Clapton Orient	32	(3)
1938–1939	Darlington	7	(0)
- * Club domestic league appearances and goals

Allan Codling (24 February 1911 – q1 1991) was an English footballer who played in the Football League for Clapton Orient and Darlington. An outside left, he was on the books of Bolton Wanderers and Hartlepools United without playing for either in the league, and also played non-league football for Whitby United, Scarborough, Gresley Rovers and Folkestone.

== Life and career ==
Codling was born in Guisborough, North Riding of Yorkshire. He began his football career with Whitby United as an amateur, before joining Bolton Wanderers. He played for Bolton's reserve team in the Central League, but not for the first team, and his contract was cancelled in January 1933. He immediately signed for Hartlepools United, and played for their reserves in the North-Eastern League, but again made no first-team appearances before leaving the club at the end of the season.

He began the 1933–34 season with Midland League club Scarborough, and spent the next with Gresley Rovers. While with Gresley he was chosen for the Central Combination select XI to play the champions, and had trials with Football League clubs Preston North End and Brighton & Hove Albion. Although a move to Brighton was reported to be well on the way to completion, Codling spent his next season with Southern League club Folkestone.

He finally played a Football League game at the start of the 1936–37 season, for Clapton Orient in the Third Division South. He set up the opening goal as Orient won 2–0 at Exeter City in September 1936, and scored three times himself from 32 league appearances over his two years with the club, against Gillingham both home and away in 1936–37, and at Torquay United in October 1937. His league career ended with seven matches for Darlington in the Third Division North. He played more frequently for their reserves, and was selected for the Rest of the North-Eastern League team for the match against the champions in March 1939.

Codling died in 1991.
