= Kilton =

== Places ==
Kilton may refer to several places in England:

- Kilton, North Yorkshire
- Kilton, Nottinghamshire
- Kilton, Somerset
  - Kilton Thorpe, near Kilton, North Yorkshire

== Other uses ==
Kilton Public Library in Lebanon, New Hampshire
