= Moorsholm =

Village in North Yorkshire, England

Coordinates: 54.518929°N 0.936270°W

- St Mary's Church

- Location within North Yorkshire
- OS grid reference: NZ6895614257
- Civil parish: Lockwood
- Unitary authority: Redcar and Cleveland
- Ceremonial county: North Yorkshire
- Region: North East
- Country: England
- Sovereign state: United Kingdom
- Post town: SALTBURN-BY-THE-SEA
- Postcode district: TS12
- Police: Cleveland
- Fire: Cleveland
- Ambulance: North East

Moorsholm is a village in the civil parish of Lockwood, in the unitary authority area of Redcar and Cleveland and the ceremonial county of North Yorkshire, England.

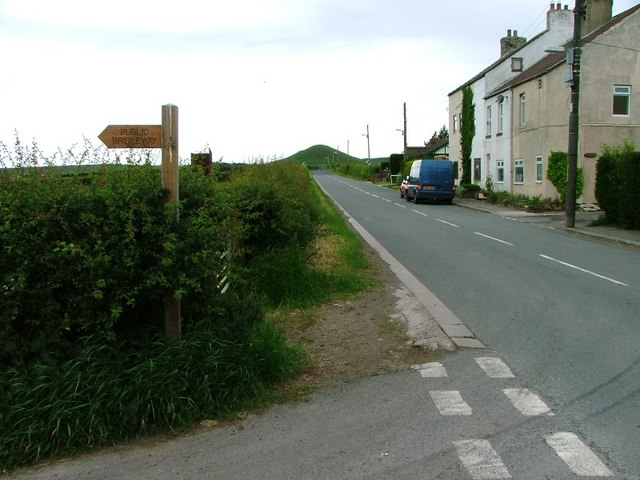
The road south out of Moorsholm, with Freebrough Hill visible in the distance, Moorsholm Moor lies further south

The village lies 5 miles (8 km) from Saltburn-by-the-Sea between the North York Moors and the North Sea. Because of its proximity to the North Sea coast the area was vulnerable, historically, to attack by invaders from Scandinavia. The name of Moorsholm is of Viking origin with the suffix holm, which meant a settlement, being affixed to the location of the village by the moors: so meaning settlement by the moors. The village used to be called Great Moorsholm to distinguish it from a farm called Little Moorsholm, which is the other side of the Hagg Beck Valley to the north. 'Little Moorsholm' is a title now more commonly applied to a more modern housing estate between that farm and Lingdale. The settlement was mentioned in the Domesday Book as Morehusum, belonging to the Earl of Morton and later Clan Bruce, ancestor to the kings of Scotland, and from them descended to the Thwengs, Lumleys, and others. It was a planned mediaeval village built along a main street with crofts and their associated tofts on each side. The church of St Mary, Moorsholm, was built in 1892 and is of stone in 12th-century style. It consists of chancel, nave and west tower.

The Memorial Hall was built as a war memorial in 1957 and is used as the doctors’ surgery and meeting room.

About 1 mile (1.6 km) to the south of Moorsholm is the landmark of Freebrough Hill, a detached natural hill which is a left over glacial drumlin a relic from the last ice age. This explains its unusual conical shape.

In 1866 Moorseholm became a separate civil parish, on 1 April 1974 the parish was abolished. In 1951 the parish had a population of 452.

== Sport ==
Moorsholm Athletic is the village football team for Junior players. The club competes in the Teesside Junior Football Alliance (TJFA). In recent years villagers have started their own tournament, pitting the under 30s in the village against the over 30s as an 11-a-side extension of the popular summer 5-a-side fixture.

Moorsholm Cricket Club has a history of activity dating back to 1911 and the club's ground is based on The Green, Guisborough Road. The club have two senior teams: a Saturday 1st XI that compete in the Langbaurgh Cricket League and a Mid-Week Senior XI in the Esk Valley Evening League. Moorsholm CC also have a junior training section that play competitive cricket in the Derwent Valley Junior Cricket League. Moorsholm also play league Quoits.
