= Freebrough Hill =

Hill in North Yorkshire, England

- Freeburgh Hill; Freeborough Hill

Highest point
- Elevation: 250 metres (821 ft) (Note: Many references to the height of the hill state that it is 265 metres (871 ft), however, the Ordnance Survey map shows its highest contour to be 250 metres (820 ft). Brown states the height to be 242 metres (794 ft).)
- Coordinates: 54.5045°N 0.9363°W

Geography
- Country: England
- County: North Yorkshire
- District: Redcar and Cleveland
- OS grid: NZ689126

Freebrough Hill is a small peak south of the village of Moorsholm, in Redcar and Cleveland, England. The hill sits just south of the A171 road and when viewed against the landscape, it has a conical-shape effect akin to Roseberry Topping. Suggestions have been put forward that the hill is man-made, but geologists state that it is a natural hill despite its appearance.

== Location and description ==
Freebrough Hill (also Freeburgh Hill or Freeborough Hill), (Note: Some writers list it as Freeborough, but mapping shows it to be Freebrough.) is a conical hill 1-mile (1.6 km) south of the village of Moorsholm in Redcar and Cleveland, previously County Cleveland (and before that, it was in the North Riding of Yorkshire), and is just within the North York Moors National Park, being at its northern boundary. John Leyland suggests that the name stems from a Danish inflection of Frith-Borh meaning a meeting place (frank pledge), and that the Angles gathered at Freeburgh Hill, much like people did at the wapentakes in the later Middle Ages. The Frith-Borh was a court of ten men who gathered at the site to settle disputes. Others state that the name is of Viking origin, being named after the Norse god, Freya, or that it means a fairy meeting place.

Many writers have postulated that the hill had some sort of druidical or Viking burial connection and that the hill was man-made. According to Ord, the area and height of the hill is proof that it is not man-made, as that would mean it would have taken "...many thousands of Britons, hundreds of years [to build]." However, geologists assert that the hill was naturally sculpted by ice during the Devensian period, and shares a similarity with nearby Roseberry Topping in that it is of a conical shape, and is hard rock (oolitic) which has been eroded to form the shape that it is now. Its conical shape has led it to being described as a "..visible outlier in the landscape with a similar shape [to Roseberry Topping]." Whilst its origins have been debated between natural and man-made, it has been suggested that it was still part of religious ceremonies through time; a cup-marked rock on the moor 800 metres (2,600 ft) to the south-west, points to the summit of the hill. Due to it being a prominent hill shaped by ice, Freebrough Hill is a Local Geological Site in the North York Moors. The hill is composed of oolite (also known as the upper estuarine series), cornbrash, and Kellaways Formation at the top.

The hill is listed as having several different heights, the most popular being that it is 250 metres (821 ft) above sea level, and the base occupies an area of 2.8 hectares (7 acres). One of the local legends is that the hill is the resting place of King Arthur and the Knights of the Round Table, who are waiting to be awoken in a time of national crisis for Britain. However, many locations throughout England lay claim to being the resting place of Arthur and his knights.

The landowner of Freebrough Hill permits people to ascend to the summit, though there is no defined path on mapping, and it remains private land. The hill has the A171 road to the north and a minor road, Dimingdale Lane, running to the east. Buses provide a near-hourly service on the X93 and X94 routes between Guisborough and Whitby. The bus-stop is at the crossroads just to the north-east of the hill.

The hill featured on a set of stamps issued in 2021 to commemorate the 70th anniversary of the opening of the first 15 national parks in the United Kingdom. Freebrough Academy, a secondary school located in nearby Brotton, takes its name from the hill.
