= Stanghow =

Village in North Yorkshire, England

Coordinates: 54.531°N 0.960°W

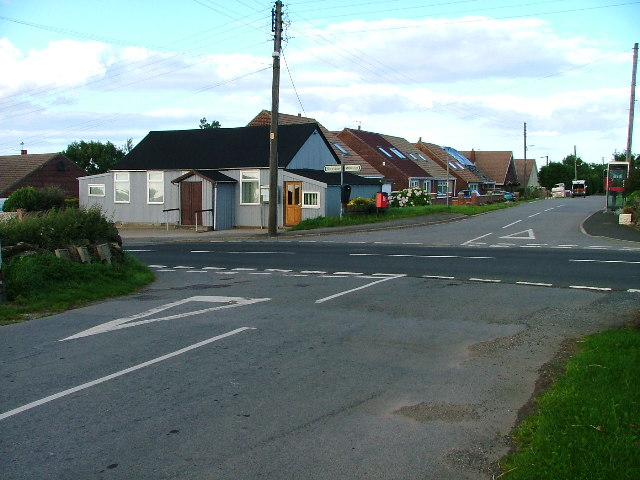
- Stanghow village hall

- Location within North Yorkshire
- OS grid reference: NZ 672 155
- Civil parish: Lockwood
- Unitary authority: Redcar and Cleveland
- Ceremonial county: North Yorkshire
- Region: Yorkshire and the Humber
- Country: England
- Sovereign state: United Kingdom
- Police: North Yorkshire
- Fire: North Yorkshire
- Ambulance: Yorkshire

Stanghow is a village in the civil parish of Lockwood, in the borough of Redcar and Cleveland and the ceremonial county of North Yorkshire, England.

It has won Britain in Bloom twice, in 2010 and 2012.

== Education statistics ==
These is for the highest level education obtained by the residents of Stanghow and are from the UK Census of 2011. Stanghow has a high level of residents with either no qualifications or qualifications equal to 1 or more GCSE at grade D or below than the national average.

== History ==
The place name Stanghow is thought to derive from the Old Norse meaning Stong-how meaning pole hill. How or Howe, deriving from the Old Norse word haugr meaning a hill, is a common element in Yorkshire place name.

Stanghow was formerly a township in the parish of Skelton near Redcar, in 1866 Stanghow became a separate civil parish, on 1 April 1974 the parish was abolished. In 1951 the parish had a population of 1015.
