= Thweng =

Thweng or de Thweng is a surname. Notable people with the surname include:

- Baron Thweng, several people
- Marmaduke Thweng, 1st Baron Thweng, English knight from Yorkshire who fought in the Wars of Scottish Independence
- Robert de Thweng (c. 1205 – c. 1268), English noble who rebelled against the church authorities in Yorkshire
