= Kilton Castle =

Former castle in North Yorkshire, England

- Kilton, Redcar and Cleveland in England
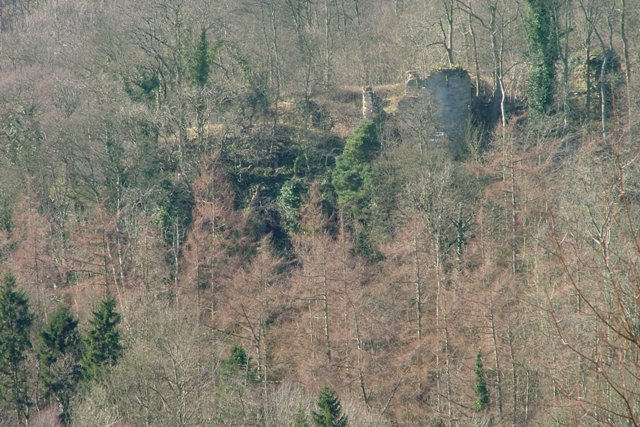
- Kilton Castle

Location
- Location within Cleveland
- Coordinates: 54.5485°N 0.9147°W
- Grid reference: NZ701175

Site history
- Built: c. 1190
- Fate: In ruins

Kilton Castle is a ruined castle overlooking the valley of Kilton Beck, near to the village of Kilton in the historic county of the North Riding of Yorkshire (now Redcar and Cleveland) in England. The castle was built in the 12th century and was described as being in a ruinous state by the 14th century, with it being totally abandoned by the 16th century. Kilton Castle was owned by several noble families who hailed from the area; de Brus, de Kilton, Autrey, de Thweng, de Lumley.

The setting of the castle on a promontory above the valley meant that it had slopes leading up to three sides and a fourth side (to the west) had a narrow entrance into the valley wall. Due to its commanding position and man-made and natural defences, it has been labelled the "most powerful baronial fortress in Cleveland." Its rebuilding in stone in the late 12th century was accomplished without need of a keep, which has led to it being known as the first castle in the north of England to be keepless.

== History ==
The land around Kilton and Skinningrove was granted to the de Brus family after The Conquest. The nearest village of Kilton, after which the castle is named, is recorded in the Domesday Book, although the castle site was located south east of the village. It is likely some farmsteads were planned at the same time as the castle, being wholly independent of the village. The castle was built c. 1140 in timber (later recreated in stone c. 1190) by either by the de Brus or the de Kilton/de Kylton families. Ord, writing in the History of Cleveland, states that: "As a fortress, it must have proved impregnable previous to the introduction of artillery; being placed on a high jutting eminence, surrounded by steep precipices, except to the west, where the ditches, foss, inner vallum, and traces of the barbican gate are distinctly observable."

The castle was built from the local orange/brown sandstone, on a promontory above Kilton Beck, some 300 feet (91 m) above the beck itself, with steep valley walls leading upwards from the water to the castle. The castle was about 300-foot (91 m) long by 60-foot (18 m) wide. The valley top on the opposite side of the beck is of similar height, or higher, but was sufficiently distant away to prevent attack from artillery available at that time the castle was occupied. This led to it being labelled as "most powerful baronial fortress in Cleveland" and meant that the only assault available was from the west, which Peter de Mauley tried between 1215 and 1216 when he had the castle besieged. The castle was only able to be approached from the west by a narrow neck of land, which was protected by a deep ditch on either side of the approach road. Due to the defensive nature of the castle, De Mauley's attempt to overrun the castle failed, and on the death of King John in 1216, an accord was made between de Mauley and Sir Richard de Alta Ripa (Sir Richard de Autrey), the inhabitant of the castle.

In 1222, Alta Ripa/Autrey died and his widow, only 22, was given in marriage to Sir Robert de Thweng by Sir William de Kylton, the owner of the castle. Thereafter, the right of advowson in the local estate was in dispute between de Thweng and the local clergy, who had been appointed straight from Italy. De Thweng actually went and appealed directly to the Pope. He is believed to have been dead by 1257, when Kilton castle passed to his son, Marmaduke de Thweng. One of the last of the named de Thweng's to have been born in, and then to have inherited the castle, was Lucia (or Lucy) de Thweng. She was born in March 1279, with her father dying soon after her birth and her mother dying in June of the same year. Around 1285, she inherited the manors of Danby, Brotton, Kirkburn, Skinningrove and Yarm in Yorkshire as well as Bozeat in Northamptonshire. Because her parents were dead, the manors and her inheritance were held in the custody of the king, which also afforded him the right to award her hand in marriage.

By August 1294, she was married against her, and her family's wishes, to William de Latimer. Lucia was known for being "amourous" and gave birth to a son in December 1294, barely four months after her marriage. The de Latimer family used the marriage as a way of gaining influence and possession of the de Thweng castles and lands, although they suggested the illegitimacy of Lucia's son. (Note: I'Anson states in the same journal that William de Thweng, her cousin, was most likely the father of Lucia de Thweng's son, who became William de Latimer, later Baron latimer of Danby.) Lucia was divorced from de Latimer in 1305 and went back to Kilton castle, though there is some suggestion that by this time, the castle was in ruins and she was living in the village. Lucia had at least two other lovers and was married to Richard de Everingham, and then later, Bartholomew Fanacourt. Lucia arranged for her sons not to inherit any of the de Thweng estates and so ownership of Kilton went to Marmaduke Thweng, 1st Baron Thweng, her uncle.

Lucia de Thweng died in January 1347 at the manor house in Kilton. Her funeral was performed in the Chapel of St Peter inside the castle.

Through the death of Marmaduke de Thweng (III) at the Battle of Stirling Bridge and the fact that Marmaduke Thweng, 1st Baron Thweng's second son, William, died without an heir, the castle was bequeathed to his eldest daughter, Lucia de Lumley (Note: Lucia de Lumley was born Lucia de Thweng and was the cousin of the first Lucia de Thweng, with both of them owning Kilton castle, but at different times.) in 1341. By 1347, the castle had only one occupant, Catherine, the widow of William de Thweng, though it has been written that she occupied only a small number of rooms and the rest of the castle was in ruins. In 1537, after the execution of George Lumley, who took an active part in the Pilgrimage of Grace, the crown took possession of what was left of the castle, and later in the same century, it was described as being totally abandoned. Because of his execution, the Lumley Barony was put into attainder by the crown.

Archaeological excavations in the 1960s and 70s revealed that the inner bailey was protected by two circular towers. Charred remains and remnants found at the bottom of the well were sifted and were indicative of a medieval diet; they were found to contain the cooked bones of seals, geese, swans, chickens and blackbirds. Whilst there is no evidence at above ground, the foundations of these towers still exist underground. The ruins of the castle have been listed as a grade I listed structure, with the whole site being designated as a scheduled monument.

== Footprint ==
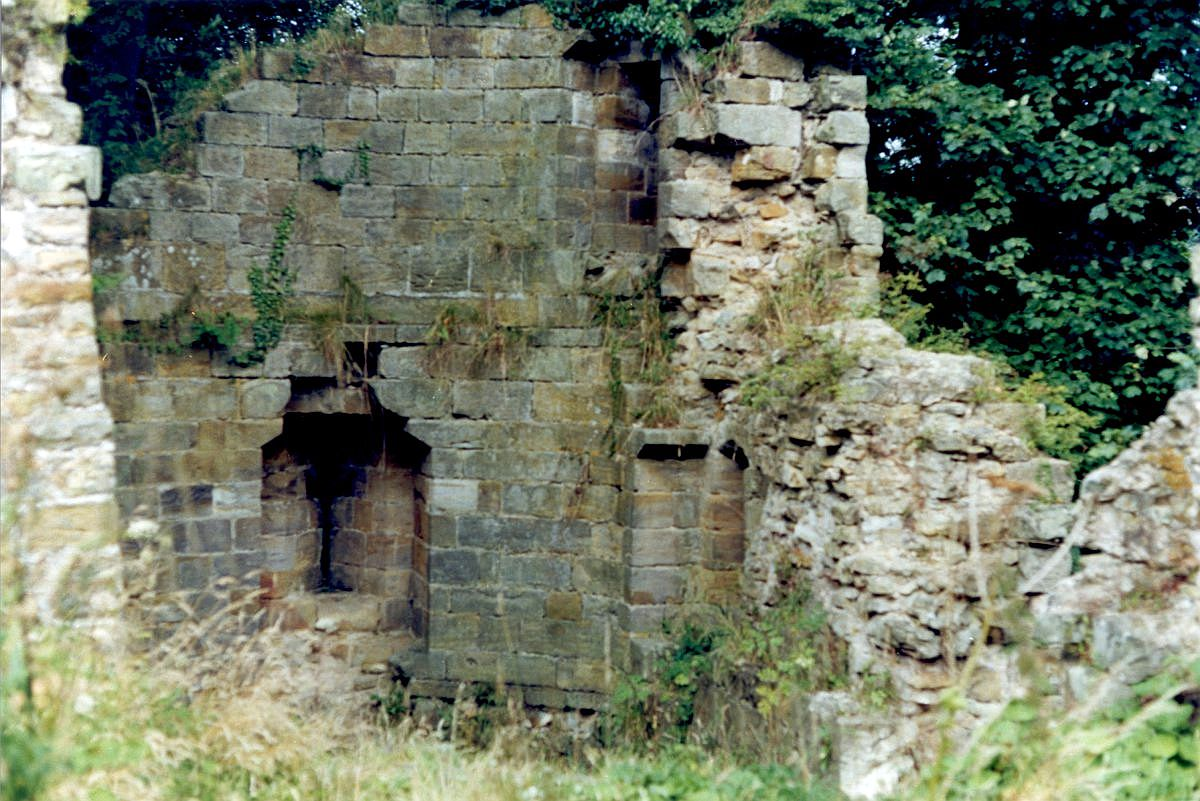
Remains of the north east tower of Kilton Castle

Kilton was a relatively small castle compared to others in North Yorkshire; at 0.5 acres (0.20 ha), it was only one sixth the size of Richmond Castle. Detailed analysis can only be determined from the ruins, and as the site was in waste by the 14th century, what little information has revealed that the castle was approximately 300 feet (91 m) by 60 feet (18 m) on a promontory of roughly the same footprint, but only slightly larger which gave it a "stretched out appearance". Because of these odd dimensions, when William de Kilton rebuilt the castle in stone c. 1190, he built it without a Keep, (Note: The old name for a castle without a Keep was written as enceintric.) thus making it possible that Kilton was the first castle in the North of England to be built without one. (Note: Young suggests that there was a Keep on the eastern side of the castle, but he is the only source known to do so.)

The only approach was from the west which was flanked on either side of the road by a deep ditch and there remains the possibility that access was via a drawbridge. After the entrance gate heading east there followed the stables, the outer courtyard, the cellar, the kitchen, the barbican, the great hall and the inner courtyard. Three towers flanked the north/east edge of the castle; the Stable Tower, the North Tower, the Apsidal Tower and the North East Tower. The North Tower was said to have been the highest, reaching over 60 feet (18 m) in height. The depth of the walls varied according to the particular wall or room, the walls on the eastern side were about 5 feet (1.5 m) and the dungeon walls were estimated to be 8 feet (2.4 m) thick.

The Chantry Chapel of St Peter was located within the great hall of the castle, having been built by Sir William de Kylton c. 1190. It was de-consecrated by Ralph Lumley, 1st Baron Lumley in 1398.
