= Old All Saints Church, Skelton-in-Cleveland =

Coordinates: 54.5623°N 0.9925°W

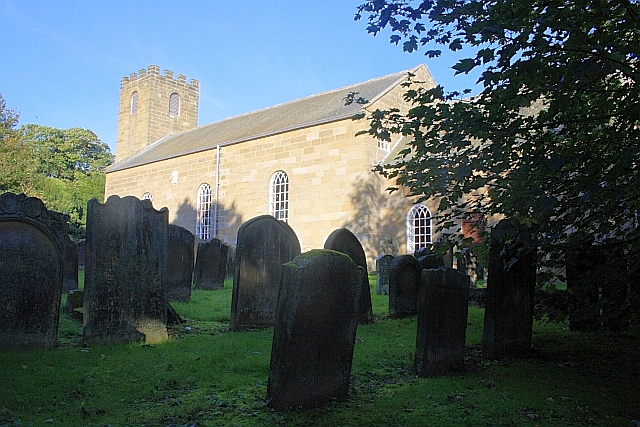
- Old All Saints Church and graveyard, Skelton-in-Cleveland

- Location in North Yorkshire
- OS grid reference: NZ 65252 19038
- Location: Skelton-in-Cleveland, North Yorkshire
- Country: England
- Denomination: Anglican
- Website: Churches Conservation Trust

History
- Dedication: All Saints

Architecture
- Functional status: Redundant
- Heritage designation: Grade II*
- Designated: 25 May 1966
- Architectural type: Church
- Completed: 1785

Specifications
- Materials: Sandstone, Lakeland slate roofs

Old All Saints Church is a redundant Anglican church in the town of Skelton-in-Cleveland, North Yorkshire, England. It is recorded in the National Heritage List for England as a designated Grade II* listed building, and is in the care of the Churches Conservation Trust.

== History ==
The church was rebuilt on a site near Skelton Castle in 1785 by John Hall-Stevenson. It replaced an older church on the same site that had been built by the Fauconberg family in the 14th century. Part of the fabric of the older church was incorporated into this church; this consists of part of the north wall of the chancel, supported by a buttress. This, on its interior, includes memorials to the Trotter family of the castle. In 1859 a font in Caen stone was given to the church. In 1884 a new church, also dedicated to All Saints, was opened in High Street. The font and one of the bells were moved to the new church. The roofs of the church were repaired and re-slated in 1911. The old church was vested in the Trust on 1 December 1996.

== Architecture ==
=== Exterior ===
The church is constructed in sandstone. It has Lakeland slate roofs, with a stone ridge and copings to the gables. Its plan consists of a three-bay nave with a north transept and north-west vestry, a chancel, and a west tower. The nave measures 61 feet 6 inches (18.75 m) by 25 feet 6 inches (7.77 m), the chancel 26 feet 9 inches (8.15 m) by 18 feet 6 inches (5.64 m), the transept 16 feet (4.88 m) by 9 feet 6 inches (2.90 m), and the interior of the tower is 9 feet (2.74 m) square. The tower has three stages; in the bottom stage is a round-headed south doorway, in the middle stage is a west window with a pointed head, and in the top stage are round-headed bell openings. The summit has a battlemented parapet. In the north and west walls of the church are square windows, and in the south wall is a sundial. The transept has round-headed sash windows, and at the east end is a Venetian window. In the chancel is a round-headed priest's door and another round-headed window.

=== Interior ===
The interior of the church is plastered. There is a panelled west gallery carried on four thin fluted wooden columns containing raked seating. There is a three-decker pulpit with a tester, and panelled box pews. The transept was used as a family pew and contains box pews and a fireplace. On the north wall of the chancel are memorials dating from the 17th and 18th centuries. Also on the chancel walls and arch are painted boards containing the Ten Commandments and biblical texts. Elsewhere in the church are three medieval stone coffins and a carved coffin lid.

== See also ==
- List of churches preserved by the Churches Conservation Trust in Northern England
