= Margrove Park =

Village in North Yorkshire, England

Coordinates: 54.532°N 0.990°W

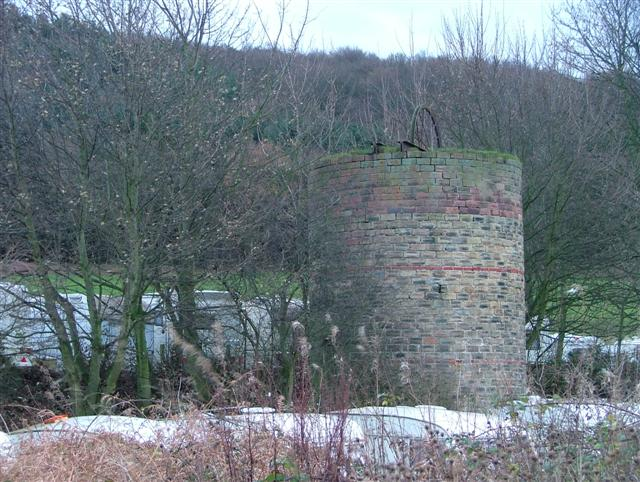
Disused mine ventilation shaft, Margrove Park caravan site

Margrove Park is a village in the borough of Redcar and Cleveland and the ceremonial county of North Yorkshire, England. It is at the eastern end of a broad valley extending eastwards from Nunthorpe and is about 2 miles (3.2 km) east of Guisborough. The terraces of houses were built for the miners who worked the adjacent ironstone mine, which was called Stanghow Mine and closed in 1925. Prior to the arrival of ironstone mining, the area was a deer park probably belonging to the owners of Skelton Castle. During the nineteenth century, a brickworks was located in the settlement known as Squire Wharton's Brickworks.

Margrove Park first appears in historical documents c. 1349 as Maugrey park with deer, and was part of the Langbaurgh Wapentake. The settlement used to be in the civil parish of Skelton-in-Cleveland and part of the Skelton & Brotton Urban District. In 1974, Margrove Park as part of the Skelton civil parish was moved into the County of Cleveland. It is now in the civil parish of Lockwood, and is represented at Westminster as part of the Middlesbrough and South East Cleveland Constituency.

Margrove Ponds nature reserve is to the north of the settlement. The nature reserve is maintained by the Tees Valley Wildlife Trust, and the ponds are thought to have been created by the weight of shale heaps from the adjacent ironstone mine pressing down on the land.
