= Kilton Thorpe =

Village in North Yorkshire, England

Coordinates: 54.54971°N 0.93143°W

- Location within North Yorkshire
- OS grid reference: NZ692176
- Civil parish: Lockwood
- Unitary authority: Redcar and Cleveland
- Ceremonial county: North Yorkshire
- Region: North East
- Country: England
- Sovereign state: United Kingdom
- Post town: SALTBURN-BY-THE-SEA
- Postcode district: TS12
- Police: Cleveland
- Fire: Cleveland
- Ambulance: North East

Kilton Thorpe is a village in the borough of Redcar and Cleveland and the ceremonial county of North Yorkshire, England. Noted for evidence of early settlement. The outlines of an ancient village are visible in fields adjacent to the present village.

The village is mentioned in the Domesday Book as belonging to Count Mortain. Like other lands in the surrounding area, it was owned by the same noble families as those who owned nearby Kilton Castle. It was only a small settlement across two manors until the arrival of the ironstone industry when 30 workers cottages were built.

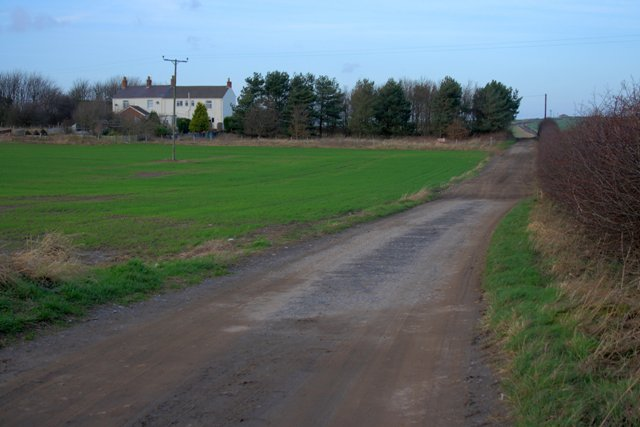
Approaching Kilton Thorpe from the south

== Kilton Mine ==
Kilton Ironstone Mine was opened in 1875 (150 years ago) just to the south of the village of Kilton Thorpe. The shafts of the mine were 700 feet (210 m) deep, and like the other mines in the area, it supplied ironstone to the furnaces on Teesside. A private railway was opened in 1873, becoming the property of the North Eastern Railway a year later.

On 12 August 1899, three miners died in a gas explosion, and on 3 May 1954, an explosion in the mine killed one worker, with 15 rescuers being hospitalised after the event due to the effects of inhaling gas. The mine was closed in January 1963.

A conical shale heap still exists at the site and has become a local landmark, although it has become dangerous through land slips and the owners have taken steps to prevent access by the general public.
