= Yearby =

Village in North Yorkshire, England

Coordinates: 54.58037°N 1.07323°W

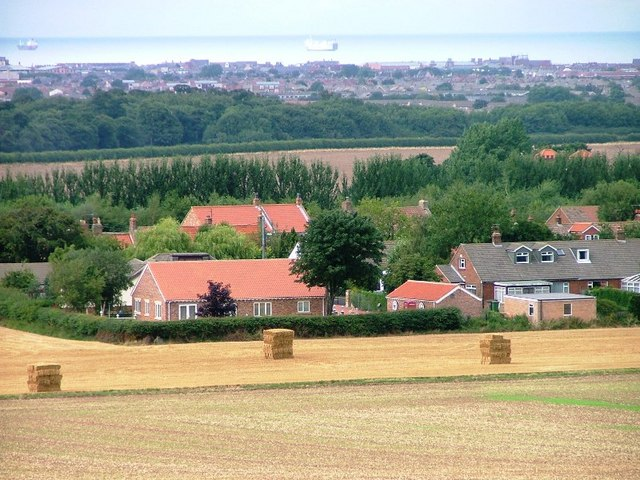
- Yearby From Yearby Wood

- Location within North Yorkshire
- OS grid reference: NZ600209
- Unitary authority: Redcar and Cleveland
- Ceremonial county: North Yorkshire
- Region: North East
- Country: England
- Sovereign state: United Kingdom
- Post town: REDCAR
- Postcode district: TS11
- Police: Cleveland
- Fire: Cleveland
- Ambulance: North East

Yearby is a village in the borough of Redcar and Cleveland and the ceremonial county of North Yorkshire, England. It is located half a mile south of Kirkleatham on the B1269 road to Guisborough, close to Marske-by-the-Sea.

== History ==
Historically the village has been a part of the Kirkleatham civil parish. The name has changed through the centuries from Overby or Ureby in the 15th century to Earby and Verby in the 17th century. For much of its history, the lands comprising Yearby have followed the path of Kirkleatham, except between 1119 and 1635. After this date, it formed part of the Kirkleatham Estate owned by the Turner family until it was broken up in 1949.

A notable building is the Yearby Old School. It was built around 1850, and is now a private dwelling, and a Grade II listed building.

== Governance ==
The village is within the Redcar Parliamentary constituency and the Dormanstown ward of Redcar and Cleveland unitary authority.
