= Charltons =

Village in North Yorkshire, England

Coordinates: 54.530°N 0.997°W

- Location within North Yorkshire
- OS grid reference: NZ6415
- Unitary authority: North Yorkshire
- Ceremonial county: North Yorkshire
- Region: North East
- Country: England
- Sovereign state: United Kingdom

Charltons is a village in the unitary authority of Redcar and Cleveland and the ceremonial county of North Yorkshire, England.

It is 5 miles (8 km) south of Saltburn-by-the-Sea on the A171.

The village was named after Thomas Charlton who built the cottages for the miners at his Slapewath ironstone mine around 1870. The housing in the village is of two rows of terraces. A third row of houses was demolished in the 1960s due to subsidence.
