= John Hall-Stevenson =

John Hall-Stevenson (1718 – March 1785), in his youth known as John Hall, was an English country gentleman and writer.

He is memorialised as "Eugenius" in Laurence Sterne's novels Tristram Shandy and A Sentimental Journey Through France and Italy.

== Life ==
Hall-Stevenson was the son of Joseph Hall of Durham by his marriage to Catherine, sister and heiress of Lawson Trotter of Skelton Castle at Skelton-in-Cleveland, Yorkshire.

On 16 June 1735, at the age of seventeen, he matriculated at Jesus College, Cambridge as a fellow-commoner. He quickly struck up a close and lifelong friendship with Laurence Sterne, who was five years older. They referred to each other as cousins, but no kinship is known. Hall was precociously ribald and loved Rabelaisian literature. He left Cambridge without a degree in about 1738 and made the grand tour.

On his return to England at the age of twenty, Hall married Anne, the daughter of Ambrose Stevenson of the Manor House, Durham, and added his wife's surname to his own. After the Jacobite rising of 1745, his uncle Lawson Trotter, a supporter of Jacobitism, fled overseas, and the fifteenth-century Skelton Castle came into the possession of Hall-Stevenson's mother. On her death, he inherited it, by then half-ruined.

Hall-Stevenson had no love of field sports and spent his time on literature and entertaining his friends. He wrote verse in imitation of La Fontaine and collected kindred spirits which whom he formed a "club of demoniacks" which met at Skelton several times a year. The club indulged in heavy drinking and orgies which were pale reflections of those of Francis Dashwood and his friends at Medmenham. The "demoniacks" included the clergyman Robert Lascelles, nicknamed Pantagruel, Zachary Moore, Colonel Hall, Colonel Lee, and Andrew Irvine of Kirkleatham. On his visits to London, Hall-Stevenson met John Wilkes and Horace Walpole, and three familiar letters from him to Wilkes written in 1762 survive. He also claimed a friendship with Rousseau.

Hall-Stevenson became notorious for licentious verse. He published a Lyric Epistle (1760) to his friend Sterne on the triumph of Tristram Shandy, which Gray called "absolute nonsense". Better known were his Fables for Grown Gentlemen (1761), and his Crazy Tales (1762, new editions in 1764 and 1780), which describes the meetings of his friends at Skelton, or "Crazy Castle".

Horace Walpole credited Hall-Stevenson with "a vast deal of original humour and wit", but Smollett and The Critical Review were contemptuous, with the result that in 1760, Hall-Stevenson abused Smollett and his associates in A Nosegay and a Simile for the Reviewers and Two Lyrical Epistles, or Margery the Cook Maid, to the Critical Reviewers. Hall-Stevenson's A Sentimental Dialogue between two Souls in the palpable Bodies of an English Lady of Quality and an Irish Gentleman (1768) was seen as a parody of his friend Sterne's Tristram Shandy.

Hall-Stevenson also wrote on politics. He denounced the Earl of Bute and all politicians, whether Whig or Tory, with such works as A Pastoral Cordial; or an Anodyne Sermon, preached before their Graces Newcastle and Devonshire (1763), A Pastoral Puke; a second Sermon preached before the people called Whigs; by an Independent (1764), Makarony Fables, with the new Fable of the Bees (1767), Lyric Consolations, with the Speech of Alderman Wilkes delivered in a Dream (1768) and An Essay upon the King's Friends (1776).

Hall-Stevenson gave some financial support to his friend Sterne, who often visited him at Skelton, and they liked to race chariots over the sands at Saltburn, and Hall-Stevenson appears under the name of "Eugenius" in Sterne's novels Tristram Shandy and A Sentimental Journey Through France and Italy. This was unfinished at Sterne's death, and Hall-Stevenson wrote a continuation entitled Yorick's Sentimental Journey Continued: to Which Is Prefixed Some Account of the Life and Writings of Mr. Sterne.

Hall-Stevenson's heavy drinking led to chronic hypochondria and he also had money troubles. In 1765, he reopened an alum works at Selby Hagg which had been closed down for near fifty years, but it lost money. He failed to make it pay, and gave it up in 1776. On 17 February 1785, he wrote to his grandson that he had suffered from marrying too early and that shortage of funds had forced him to live in the country.

He died at Skelton in March 1785, and his widow survived him until 1790. One of Hall-Stevenson's two sons, John, died unmarried, and the other, Joseph William Hall-Stevenson (1741–1786), died a year after his father, leaving a son, John Hall-Stevenson (1766–1843), who inherited Skelton Castle and rebuilt it. In 1788, he changed his name to John Wharton. He was Member of Parliament for Beverley between 1790 and 1820.

Hall-Stevenson's works were collected and published in three volumes in 1795.
