= Saltburn War Memorial =

Saltburn War Memorial in 2010...

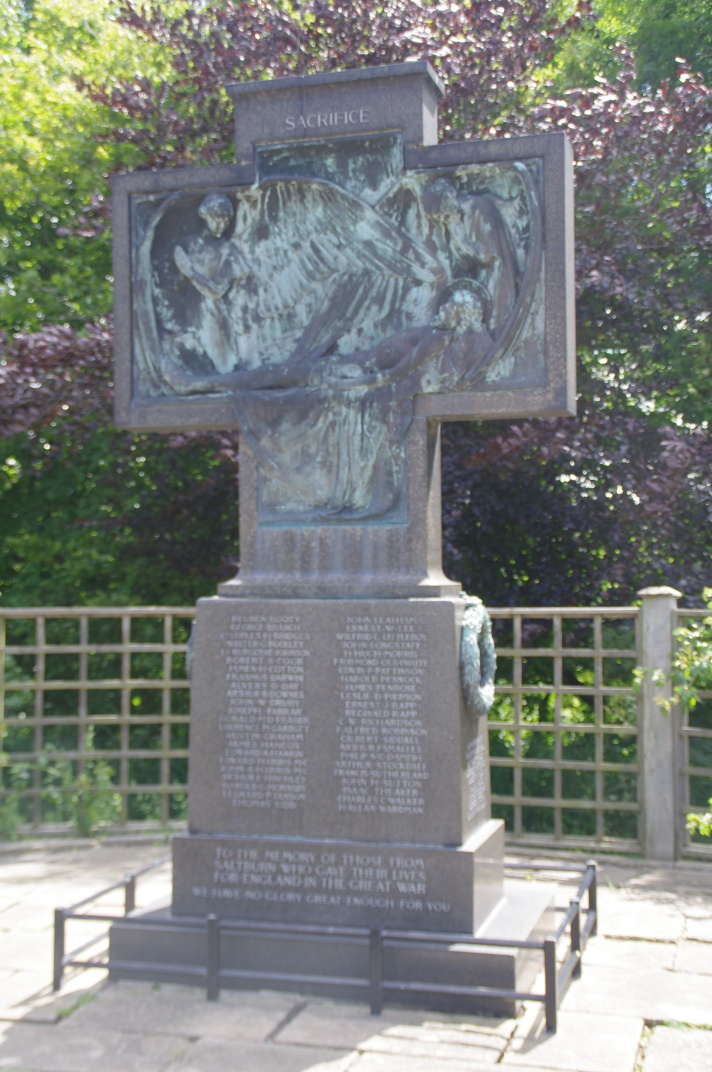
...and in 2012

54.580879°N 0.972497°W

Saltburn War Memorial is a war memorial in Saltburn-by-the-Sea, North Yorkshire. It was unveiled in 1920, and lies to the east side of Glenside, now beside the Saltburn Valley Country Park. In 1999, it was listed at Grade II* in the National Heritage List for England.

The memorial was designed by Sir William Reynolds-Stephens in 1919. It is made from granite and bronze, in the Arts and Crafts style. It cost £1500, principally funded by Charles William Littleboy, a local shipbuilder, whose son Wilfred Evelyn Littleboy, lieutenant in the Royal Warwickshire Regiment, is commemorated on the memorial. He is also commemorated by Littleboy Park in Thornaby-on-Tees

It comprises stone cross of polished red granite, with broad but shallow arms, measuring 3.5 m × 1.5 m × 1 m (11.5 ft × 4.9 ft × 3.3 ft), mounted on a stepped plinth, inset with a large bronze plaque that depicts Christ in the tomb with two angels. The bronze is signed "W. Reynolds-Stephens 1919". The base of memorial bears a dedication "TO THE MEMORY OF THOSE FROM SALTBURN WHO GAVE THEIR LIVES FOR ENGLAND IN THE GREAT WAR / WE HAVE NO GLORY GREAT ENOUGH FOR YOU". To either side of the plinth are bronze wreaths with the dates "1914" and "1918". The plinth is inscribed with the names of 64 war dead from First World War, including Erasmus Darwin IV, grandson of Charles Darwin. It was unveiled on 14 November 1920 by Major General Sir Percival Spearman Wilkinson KCMG CB.

Another 20 names were added after the Second World War. The memorial was cleaned and rededicated on 2 October 2016

== See also ==
- Grade II* listed war memorials in England
- Grade II* listed buildings in Redcar and Cleveland
