= Slapewath =

Hamlet in Redcar and Cleveland, England

Coordinates: 54.533°N 1.012°W

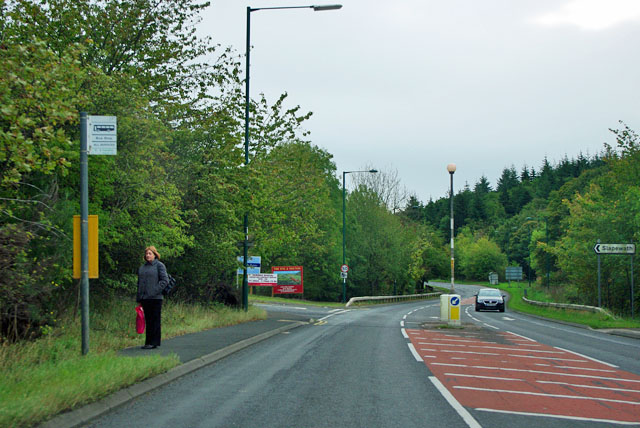
- At the bus stop, Slapewath

- Location within North Yorkshire
- OS grid reference: NZ6315
- Civil parish: Lockwood; Guisborough
- Unitary authority: Redcar and Cleveland
- Ceremonial county: North Yorkshire
- Region: North East
- Country: England
- Sovereign state: United Kingdom

Slapewath is a hamlet in the borough of Redcar and Cleveland and the ceremonial county of North Yorkshire, England. Whilst the name of the hamlet is recorded as far back as the 13th century, it was developed due to the alum and ironstone industries of the North-Eastern part of Yorkshire in the 16th and 19th centuries respectively. The hamlet lies on the A171 road.

== History ==
Slapewath is first mentioned as Slaipwath in a document from 1222. The name derives from the Old Norse of sleipr and vað, meaning slippery ford. Whilst traditionally being mostly in the Ancient Parish of Guisborough, the hamlet is also spread across the civil parish of Lockwood. Slapewath is on the A171 road, some 1.75 miles (2.82 km) east of Guisborough.

The area was developed for mining and quarrying purposes. Alum shale was first extracted and worked here to turn into alum for use as a mordant in the dyeing process of wool. Slapewath is reputedly the oldest alum quarry in Cleveland and the United Kingdom. Slapewath alum works was developed in 1604, and continued processing until the early part of the 19th century. Jet was also mined/quarried here, but by the 1850s, this industry had also disappeared.

Ironstone was discovered at Slapewath in 1840, and this allowed a third mining industry to flourish, and the Cleveland Railway was built through the area, crossing Alumworks Beck (Spa Gill) on an eight-arch (Slapewath) viaduct. Two ironstone mines were in the hamlet; Spa Wood and Slapewath, which in 1878–1879 financial year produced 60,825 tonnes (67,048 tons) and 80,542 tonnes (88,782 tons) respectively. Whilst there was never a public railway station at Slapewath, it was capable of handling goods and was the focal point for ironstone wagons for six mines in the local area. At some point the North Eastern Railway had a locomotive shed there, although in 1870, it was moved to Brusselton Bank.

The hamlet has one pub, the Fox and Hounds, and is on the Cleveland Way. The hamlet lies on the A171 road that connects Middlesbrough with Whitby, and has a regular hourly bus service through the day connecting the two towns. The layby from the main road was created in 1992 when the road was re-aligned through the area to connect with the Guisborough bypass.

Population statistics are covered as part of the civil parish of Lockwood, and the area is represented in the United Kingdom Parliament as part of the Middlesbrough South East Cleveland Constituency.

== Slapewath Viaduct ==
The viaduct, which is also known as Waterfall Viaduct, consists of eight arches, each 40 feet (12 m) wide, straddling the small valley carrying Alumworks Beck (Spa Gill). It is 60 feet (18 m) high and was built as part of the Cleveland Railway to carry iron ore from the mines of Sir Lowthian Bell, to the iron works of Ralph Ward at Port Clarence. It is now a Grade II listed structure. Part of the reason for the listing of Slapewath Viaduct is that it is the only surviving stone viaduct in the Cleveland area. All other stone viaducts have been demolished (though those on the Loftus to Whitby Line were mostly metal anyway), with only Saltburn Viaduct being the other railway structure in the area, but this is made from brick.
