= Lockwood, North Yorkshire =

Civil parish in North Yorkshire, England

Coordinates: 54.539°N 0.967°W

Lockwood
- Civil parish
- Population: 3,708 (2011 census)
- OS grid reference: NZ668156
- Civil parish: Lockwood
- Unitary authority: Redcar and Cleveland
- Ceremonial county: North Yorkshire
- Region: North East
- Country: England
- Sovereign state: United Kingdom
- Post town: SALTBURN-BY-THE-SEA
- Postcode district: TS12
- Police: Cleveland
- Fire: Cleveland
- Ambulance: North East
- UK Parliament: Middlesbrough South and East Cleveland

Lockwood is a civil parish in the unitary authority of Redcar and Cleveland with ceremonial association with North Yorkshire, England.

The parish was historically in the North Riding of Yorkshire until 1974, when it was transferred to Cleveland. In 1996, it was given to the newer county of North Yorkshire.

== Description ==
The larger part of the parish (to the south) is rural with a small section of moorland in the North York Moors National Park. The parish covers over 3,950 hectares (9,800 acres) of land between Guisborough to the west, Skinningrove to the north, Staithes to the east and Commondale to the south.

The A171 road runs diagonally north–south across the bottom corner of the parish and just south of Lockwood Beck is Lockwood Beck Reservoir. The reservoir covers a surface area of 33 acres (13.2 hectares) and has a perimeter of 1 mile (1.5 km). It was built in 1872 and feeds water into Lockwood Beck, which flows into the North Sea at Skinningrove as Kilton Beck. The reservoir is noted for its fishery and wildlife, with nathusius’ pipistrelle bats and ospreys being recorded at the site.

The southern part of the parish is peppered with Neolithic Barrows and scheduled monuments, whereas the north part is more populated and has a history of ironstone mining. Both Kilton and Lingdale had mines that supplied iron to the forges and smelters on Teesside. These were linked via industrial railways into the national network at Boosbeck.

The hamlet of Kilton has the now grade I listed ruins of a 13th-century castle. A timber constructed castle had existed on the site previously to the stone being built between 1190 and 1200. It was partially abandoned in the 14th century and by the 16th century, it was described as being worthless.

Lockwood is the location of one of three ventilation shafts for the new tunnel carrying polyhalite from Woodsmith Mine to Wilton on Teesside. Roadworks to accommodate new traffic on the A171 road were completed in 2017 with groundworks on the shaft and tunnel being started in 2018.

The parish includes the hamlets and villages of;

- Aysdalegate
- Boosbeck
- Charltons
- Kilton
- Kilton Thorpe
- Lingdale
- Little Moorsholm
- Margrove Park
- Moorsholm
- Slapewath
- Stanghow

== Demographics ==
The population of Lockwood ward in the Redcar and Cleveland Unitary authority taken at the 2011 census was 2,022.
