= Freebrough Academy =

Secondary school in Yorkshire, England

Location
- Linden Road; Brotton; North Yorkshire, TS12 2SJ; England
- Coordinates: 54.5690°N 0.9464°W

Information
- Type: Academy
- Local authority: Redcar and Cleveland
- Trust: Northern Education Trust
- Department for Education URN: 147541 Tables
- Ofsted: Reports
- Principal: Michael Garthwaite
- Gender: Coeducational
- Age: 11 to 16
- Website: fa.northerneducationtrust.org

Freebrough Academy is a coeducational secondary school and sixth form located in Brotton, Cleveland, North Yorkshire, England.

Previously known as Warsett School, it later was renamed Freebrough Specialist Engineering College, taking its name from another local landmark, Freebrough Hill. The school converted to academy status in September 2010 and was renamed Freebrough Academy. The school is sponsored by the Northern Education Trust.

Freebrough Academy offers GCSEs, BTECs, OCR Nationals and NVQs as programmes of study for pupils, while students in the sixth form have the option to study from a range of A-levels and further BTECs. The school also has specialisms in engineering and business and enterprise.
