= Kilton, North Yorkshire =

Village in the Borough of Redcar and Cleveland, England

Coordinates: 54°33′N 0°55′W

Kilton
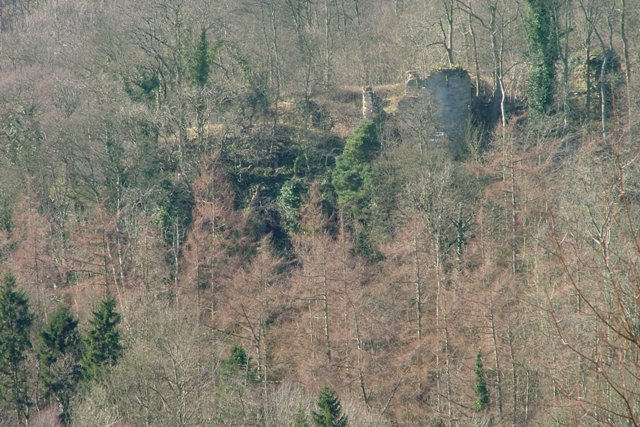
- Ruins of the 13th century Kilton Castle

- Location within North Yorkshire
- Civil parish: Lockwood
- Unitary authority: Redcar and Cleveland
- Ceremonial county: North Yorkshire
- Region: Yorkshire and the Humber
- Country: England
- Sovereign state: United Kingdom

Kilton is a village in the civil parish of Lockwood, in the borough of Redcar and Cleveland, in the ceremonial county of North Yorkshire, England.

== History ==
The village is recorded in the Domesday Book as Chiltune, which is possibly derived from a combination of Old Norse and Old English of "narrow-valley farm/settlement' or a Scandinavianised form of cilda-tun, 'children's farm/settlement." The village is to the west of Kilton Beck Valley, a narrow cut that carries the Kilton Beck to the sea at Skinningrove. The remains of Kilton Castle lie to the south east and the village is 7 miles (11 km) east of Guisborough and 1.5 miles (2.4 km) south of Brotton.

In the 13th century, Kilton Castle was the base of the rebel Will Wither.

Kilton was formerly a township in the parish of Brotton, in 1866 Kilton became a separate civil parish, on 1 April 1974 the parish was abolished. In 1951 the parish had a population of 250.
