= Robert de Thweng =

English noble (c. 1205 – c. 1268)

- Knight
- Born: c. 1205
- Died: c. 1268

Thweng's arms: on an argent field, a fess of gules between three popinjays (parrots). These arms are now borne by his descendant the Earl of Scarbrough

Robert de Thweng (c. 1205 – c. 1268) was a noble who rebelled against the church authorities in Yorkshire, England.

== Life ==
Robert de Thweng gained ownership of the Castle of Kilton through his marriage to Matilda, niece of Sir William de Kylton and widow of Richard de Autrey, in 1222. He thus inherited a dispute with the Prior of Gisborough, concerning the advowson of the parish priest at Kirkleatham, particularly that the Prior had tried to gain control of the parish whilst Sir William was infirm. He was angered by what he saw as the imposition of foreign (Italian) priests.

When Robert had exhausted all the ecclesiastical routes of appeal, he turned to rebellion (around Easter 1232), and raided church properties, especially those belonging to foreign churchmen, under the sobriquet Will Wither (literally 'William the Angry'), and distributed the spoils among the poor. He was excommunicated by the Papal Legate in England, Cardinal Otto.

He was given support by the great northern Magnate families: Percy, Neville, Fitz-Randolph, de Vesci, de Maulay, de Menyll, de Roos and de Brus.

He presented his case to Henry III of England who, rather than punish him, gave him letters of recommendation to take to Pope Gregory IX. The Pope ruled in his favour, bringing the rebellion of Will Wither to an end. Biographies suggest that the influence of Richard of Cornwall may have been decisive in this case.

In 1240 Robert set out with Richard on Crusade, but he probably never reached The Holy Land, as he was dispatched as an envoy to Frederick II. In 1244 he was charged with assaulting the Archbishop of York, Walter de Gray, and his lands were seized, but later returned to him.

His later life is unclear. He may have been alive during the Second Barons' War, and one biography suggests he took Henry's side, although there is evidence he may have been dead by 1257, when his son Marmaduke was apparently in control of the major Thweng estates.
