= Saltburn, Marske and New Marske =

Civil parish in North Yorkshire, England

Coordinates: 54.589°N 1.013°W

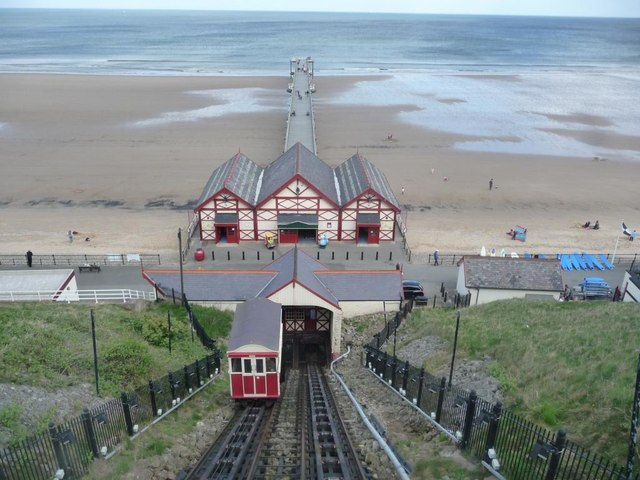
- Saltburn Cliff Lift

- Location within North Yorkshire
- Population: 19,134 (2011 census)
- Civil parish: Saltburn, Marske and New Marske
- Unitary authority: Redcar and Cleveland
- Ceremonial county: North Yorkshire
- Region: North East
- Country: England
- Sovereign state: United Kingdom

Saltburn, Marske and New Marske is a civil parish in the Redcar and Cleveland district, in the ceremonial county of North Yorkshire, England. As its name suggests, the parish includes Saltburn, Marske-by-the-Sea and New Marske. It borders the parishes of Skelton and Brotton, Guisborough and the unparished area of Redcar.

In parliamentary terms, the parish is split between the constituencies of Middlesbrough South and East Cleveland, and Redcar.

== Demographics ==
According to the 2001 census the parish had a population of 18,325, increasing to 19,134 at the 2011 census.

== Governance ==
The area, 1889–1974, was in the North Riding of Yorkshire administrative county. From 1894 until 1932, Saltburn had an urban district while Marske was in the Guisborough Rural District. In 1932 the Saltburn and Marske-by-the-Sea Urban District was formed with both parishes retained separately.

The parishes merged in 1974 and acquired its present name in 1983. The district was replaced with the larger Cleveland county's Borough of Langbaurgh, the Borough was renamed to Langbaurgh-on-Tees in 1988 and to Redcar and Cleveland in 1996.
