= Brotton =

Village in North Yorkshire, England

Coordinates: 54.568°N 0.937°W

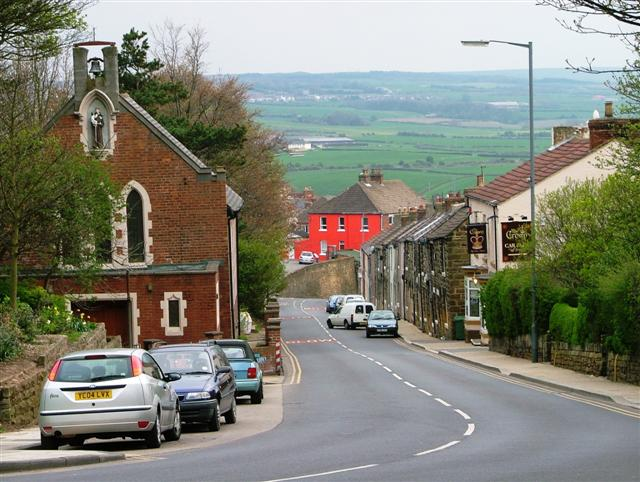
- Brotton High Street

- Location within North Yorkshire
- Population: 5,394 (2011 census)
- OS grid reference: NZ685198
  - London: 210 mi (340 km) S
- Civil parish: Skelton and Brotton
- Unitary authority: Redcar and Cleveland
- Ceremonial county: North Yorkshire
- Region: North East
- Country: England
- Sovereign state: United Kingdom
- Post town: SALTBURN-BY-THE-SEA
- Postcode district: TS12
- Dialling code: 01287
- Police: Cleveland
- Fire: Cleveland
- Ambulance: North East
- UK Parliament: Middlesbrough South and East Cleveland

Brotton is a village in the civil parish of Skelton and Brotton, in the Redcar and Cleveland district, in the ceremonial county of North Yorkshire, England It is situated approximately 2.5 miles (4 km) south-east of Saltburn-by-the-Sea, 9 miles from Redcar, 12 miles (19 km) east of Middlesbrough and 14 miles (23 km) north-west of Whitby.

East Cleveland Hospital operates in the village.

== History ==
The name of the village (known in medieval times as 'Broctune') means Brook Farm (settlement by a stream), being derived from the Old English brōc and tūn. The village is listed in the Domesday Book, and used to be in the Langbaurgh Wapentake. Warsett Hill tops the large Huntcliffe which was the site of one of the many Roman signal stations built along the east coast to defend against Anglo-Saxon attack. Brotton was one of a number of manors granted by William the Conqueror to Robert de Brus, Lord of Skelton. Over recent years Brotton has become somewhat isolated because of a bypass which was opened in stages between 1998 and 2001 connecting the town of Skelton-in-Cleveland and village of Carlin How.

The discovery of ironstone brought major changes to the village and a large increase in the population. The majority of former miners' homes are found in the 'Brickyard' and 'the Park' areas of the village. Lumpsey Mine, the largest of the Brotton mines, opened in the 1880s and closed in 1954.

During the First World War Lumpsey Mine had a rail-mounted artillery piece to defend the mine against Zeppelin attack.

On 1 April 1974 the parish was abolished.

== Geography ==
Brotton is close to the seaside town of Saltburn-by-the-Sea, known for its pier, and Guisborough, with its ancient Priory and market. The village is divided into two parts: 'Top End' (the area east of the railway line) and 'Bottom End' (the area to the west).

== Demographics ==
In 1951 the civil parish had a population of 4,262. In 2011, the village had a population of 5,394.

== Landmarks ==
Brotton Anglican church is dedicated to St Margaret. The village contains a parade of shops on High Street, and its public houses include The Green Tree and The Queen's Arms.

== Education ==
Brotton has two primary schools, Badger Hill Primary School and St Peter's Church of England school. There is also a school for children with learning difficulties, Kilton Thorpe. The village secondary school, Freebrough Academy, has recently been rebuilt.

== Notable people ==
The sculptor Charles Robinson Sykes (1875–1950), was born in the village. There is a house on Child Street which has a plaque dedicated to him. He designed the Spirit of Ecstasy mascot which is used on Rolls-Royce cars.
