= Marmaduke Thweng, 1st Baron Thweng =

English knight

Thweng's arms: on an argent field, a fess of gules between three popinjays (parrots). These arms are now borne by his descendant the Earl of Scarbrough

Sir Marmaduke Thweng (or Tweng, Thwinge etc.), later 1st Baron Thweng, was an English knight from Yorkshire who fought in the Wars of Scottish Independence.

== Family ==
The son of Sir Marmaduke Thweng of Kilton and his wife Lucy de Brus. His mother was the great, great-granddaughter of Adam de Brus, Lord of Skelton brother to Robert de Brus, 1st Lord of Annandale, Thweng was also a vassal of Robert de Brus, 6th Lord of Annandale by virtue of the latter's fief in the North Riding, ties that would have far reaching effects during his career.

== Military career ==
In 1295 he fought for King Edward I in Gascony, along with John de Thweng.

In 1297 Marmaduke achieved some fame at the Battle of Stirling Bridge by an heroic escape. Over 100 English knights had been trapped, together with several thousand infantry, on the far side of the river, and were being slaughtered by the Scots. Thweng managed to fight his way back across the bridge and he thus became the only knight of all those on the far side of the river to survive the battle. Following the rout, Thweng with William FitzWarin were appointed castellans of Stirling Castle by the English leader John de Warenne, 6th Earl of Surrey. The castle was quickly starved into submission, and Thweng and FitzWarin were taken prisoner to Dumbarton Castle. He was summoned to Parliament in 1307, thus becoming Baron Thweng.

At the Battle of Bannockburn in 1314, however, after the English defeat, Sir Marmaduke apparently made no attempt to escape. Instead he wandered over the battlefield until he located Robert the Bruce; only then was he prepared to surrender, and only to the victorious King. Robert recognised Sir Marmaduke and released him and Ralph de Monthermer, also captured, both without ransom, but not without first entertaining them at table.

== Marriage and issue ==
Thweng married Isabel de Ros, daughter of William de Ros of Ingmanthorpe, and had several children, including:

- William Thweng, 2nd Baron Thweng (d. 1341)
- Robert Thweng, 3rd Baron Thweng (d. 1344)
- Thomas Thweng, 4th Baron Thweng (d. 1374)
- Lucia Thweng, married Robert de Lumley (grandparents of Ralph Lumley, 1st Baron Lumley)
- Margaret Thweng, married Sir Robert de Hilton
- Katherine Thweng, married Sir Ralph d'Aubenie (5th great-grandparents of Sir John de Markham I, Lord of Cotham and Sedgebroke, Sheriff of Nottinghamshire, Derbyshire and the Royal Forests (1519, 1526 & 1534))

His three sons each succeeded to the barony in turn; the first son married, but died childless, while the second and third sons were clergymen and died unmarried. With the death of the last son, the barony fell into abeyance among the heirs of his daughters.
