= Kirkleatham =

Area of Redcar in North Yorkshire, England

Coordinates: 54.583333°N 1.083333°W

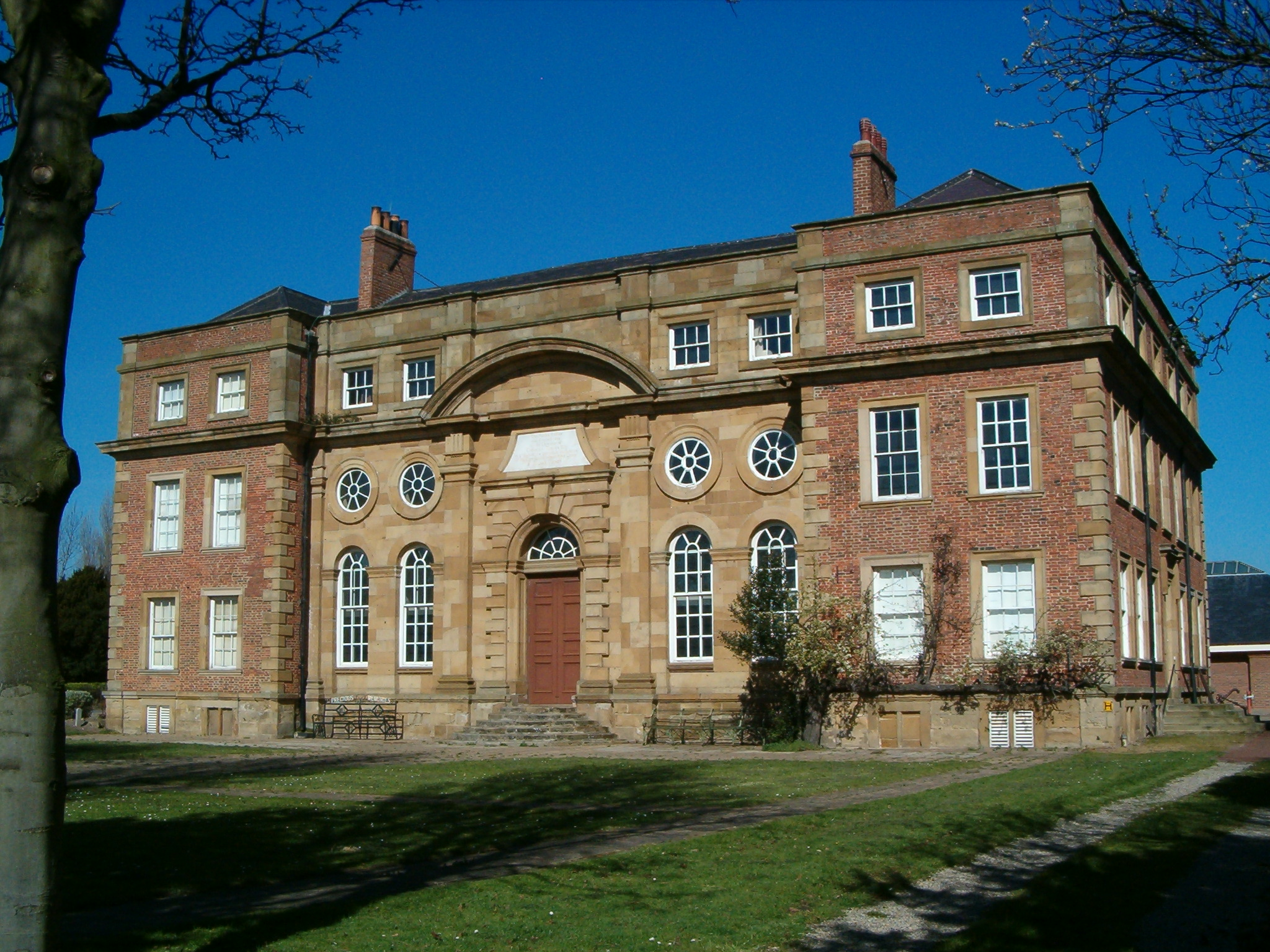
- Kirkleatham Free School of 1709, now Kirkleatham Old Hall Museum

- Location within North Yorkshire
- Population: 7,045 (2011.Ward)
- Unitary authority: Redcar and Cleveland
- Ceremonial county: North Yorkshire
- Region: North East
- Country: England
- Sovereign state: United Kingdom
- Post town: REDCAR
- Postcode district: TS10
- Police: Cleveland
- Fire: Cleveland
- Ambulance: North East

Kirkleatham is an area of Redcar in the borough of Redcar and Cleveland in North Yorkshire, England. It is approximately 4 1/2 miles (7 kilometres) north-northwest of Guisborough, and three miles (five kilometres) south of Redcar centre. It was listed in the Domesday Book of 1086.

The area has a collection of buildings that formed the Turner Estate, named after the Turner family who lived in the area from 1661. It has one of the best collections of Georgian-style buildings in England.

== Demographics ==
In 1086, the village had "9.1 households" according to the Domesday Book. The creation of a Free School in 1709 added a further 40 people. In 1951 the civil parish had a population of 403.

== History ==
The name of the village comes from the old Norse ‘kirk’ (church) and ‘hlíð’ (slopes). Literally, "churchslopes." It is thought there has been a church on the site since the 9th century AD, as a location where the body of Saint Cuthbert rested before it was taken to Durham. The parish church is named Saint Cuthbert’s from that connection. The parish records begin in 1559.

The village is mentioned in the Domesday Book of 1086. "It had a recorded population of 9.1 households in 1086, putting it in the smallest 40% of settlements recorded in Domesday, and is listed under 4 owners in Domesday Book." It had, apparently, been laid waste during the Harrying of the North. The northern magnates the Percy family held most of the land in Kirkleatham from 1086 to 1608.

In 1232 the advowson of Kirkleatham parish was at the centre of a dispute that saw local knight Sir Robert de Thweng style himself "Will Wither" and take arms against Italian ecclesiastics, which saw him raid their properties and redistribute their wealth to the poor.

Kirkleatham was acquired by the Turner family around 1624 and is the birthplace of Sir William Turner who was Lord Mayor of London in 1669. He gave most of his fortune to found the Sir William Turner's Hospital in June 1676. In present day, it is an independent almshouse. Turner bequeathed a substantial amount of money to his great nephew, Cholmley Turner, a member of parliament for Yorkshire, 1727–1741, to establish a Free School, built in 1709, that now serves as the local museum. His estate established for the care of 40 people: ten old men, ten old women, ten boys, and ten girls. The office of governor or governess falls upon the owner of the estate. Management of the estate was the responsibility of a chaplain, a master, and a mistress.

Cholmley Turner added other Grade I listed buildings, the most notable being the Turner Mausoleum, in memory of his son, and adjoining the Church of St Cuthbert. It is a Grade I listed building on Kirkleatham Lane. The mausoleum was built in 1739–40 by James Gibbs, and restored with added internal cladding in 1839. Entered from the church, it is of Baroque style and of an octagonal plan with south and south-west sides that adjoin the church. It is a single storey with a basement burial chamber. The exterior is heavily rusticated, with an unusually large area vermiculated. It contains the inscription, "This mausoleum was erected 1740 to the memory of Marwood William Turner Esquire the best of sons." Cholmley Turner also retained the architect James Gibbs for building of the chapel at the almshouses.

Cholmley Turner's nephew Sir Charles Turner, 1st Baronet, of Kirkleatham, MP for York from 1768 to 1783, continued building upon the estate. His achievement included remodelling Kirkleatham Hall, as well as providing for the further development of the hospital, school, and a library. He also built the adjoining village of Yearby.

In 1894 Kirkleatham became an urban district, but was annexed by Redcar in 1899, after just five years as an independent authority. On 1 April 1974 the parish was abolished and merged with Guisborough. Today, by 2024, it is a ward of Redcar and Cleveland council, which also includes Yearby.

In 1918, Kirkleatham was the location of a mooring-out station (a secondary base) for airships protecting the east coast based out of RNAS Howden. The site was only used during the latter half of 1918 and was closed permanently after the Armistice.

== Kirkleatham Old Hall ==
The Free School, built by Cholmley Turner, is now known as Kirkleatham Old Hall and is a Grade II* listed building.

Kirkleatham Old Hall Museum functions as the local history museum for Redcar and Cleveland. Opened in 1981, it became the Museum Service's headquarters. Five years later, a new building was opened, providing exhibition space and offices.

The finds from the Street House Anglo-Saxon cemetery – the only known Anglo-Saxon royal burial site in north-east England – are displayed in an exhibition at the museum. The artefacts were discovered in nearby Loftus during excavations which took place between 2005 and 2007. Finds include pieces associated with a rare bed burial in which a decorated female body is laid out on a decorated wooden bed, accompanied by fine gold jewellery. The finds include a gold pendant, which would have belonged to a princess. as well as glass beads, pottery, iron knives, belt buckles and other objects.

The Kirkleatham Owl and Endangered Species Centre opened to the public in 1990 and is located on the grounds of Kirkleatham Old Hall. The centre is home to one of Britain's largest collections of owls, and is also home to hawks and vultures, a caracara; a talking raven, and a kookaburra.

The Sir James Knott Lifeboat Museum is also located on the grounds of Kirkleatham Old Hall.

== Images ==
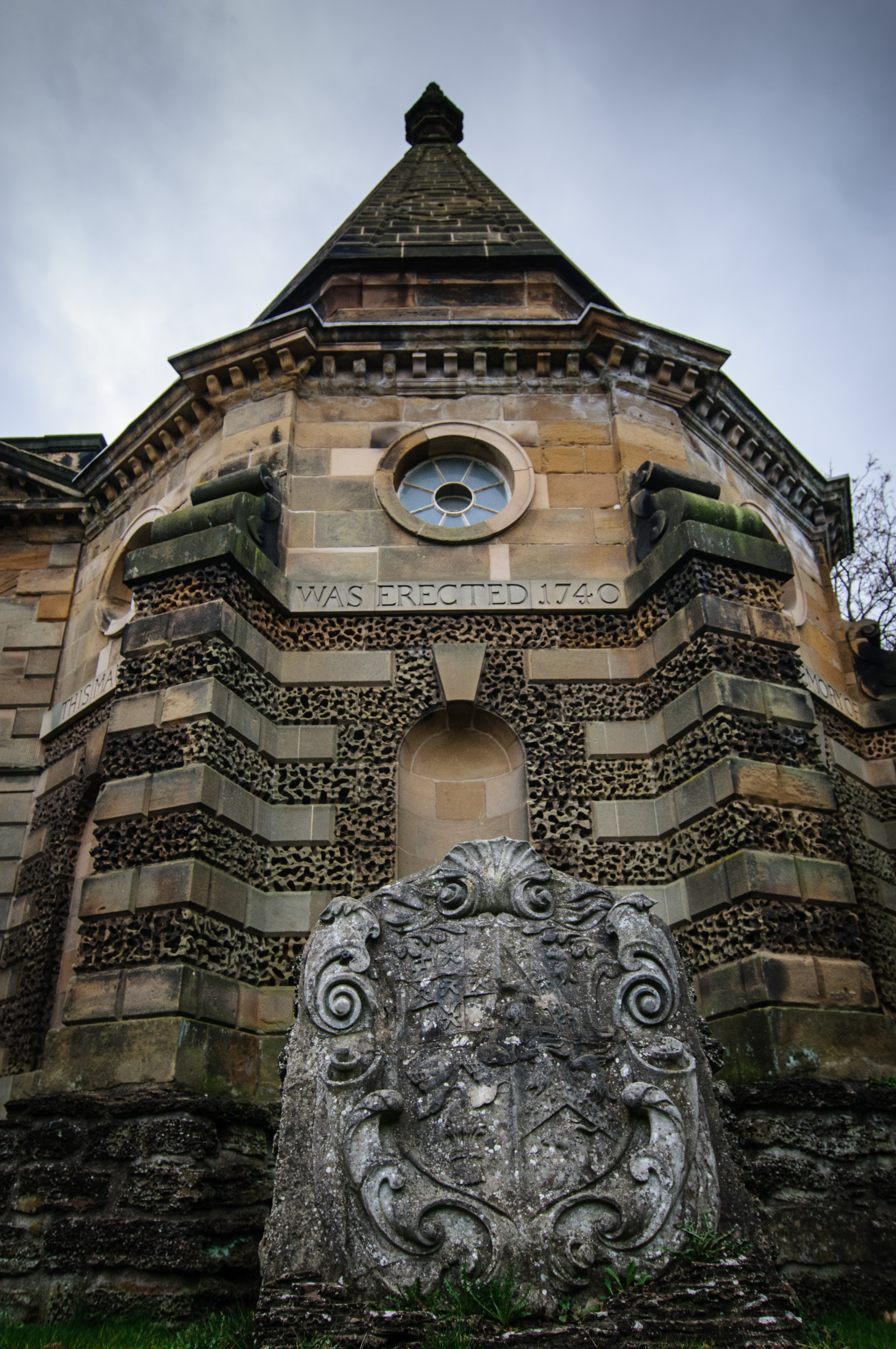
The Turner Mausoleum, 1740, by James Gibbs

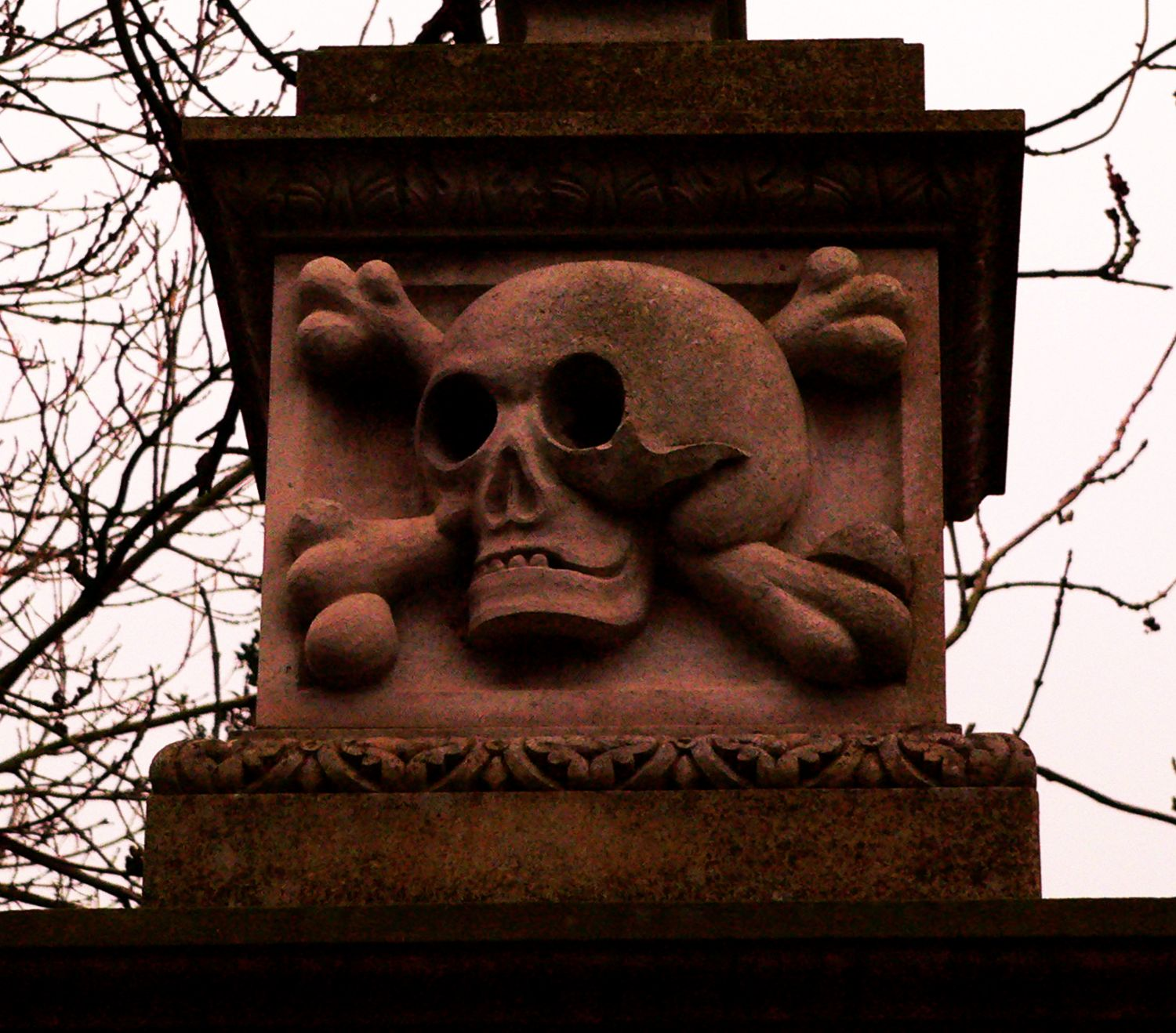
The skull and crossbones gatepost is from the nearby Church of St. Cuthbert with the Mausoleum.

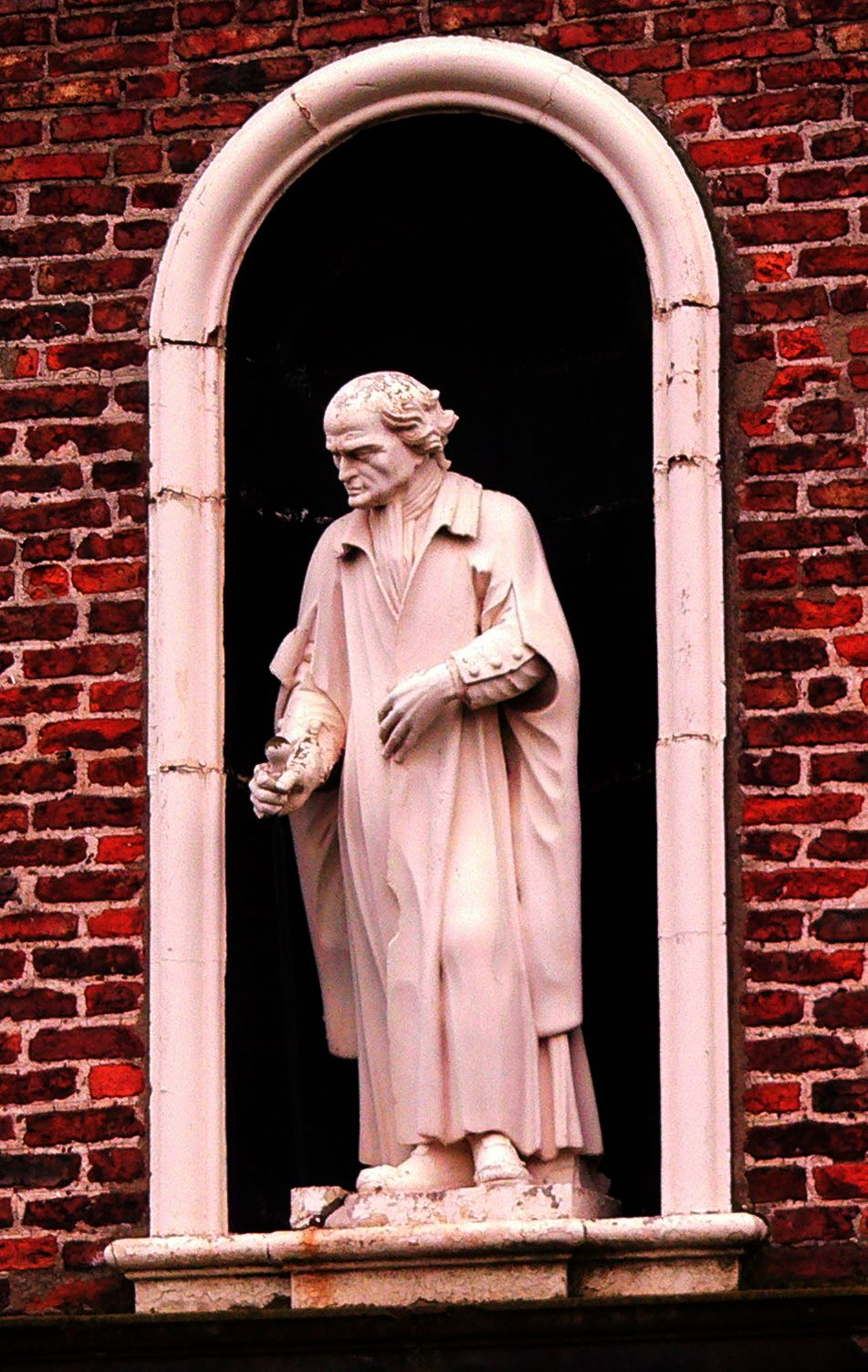
Statue of an elderly man at Sir William Turner's Almhouses

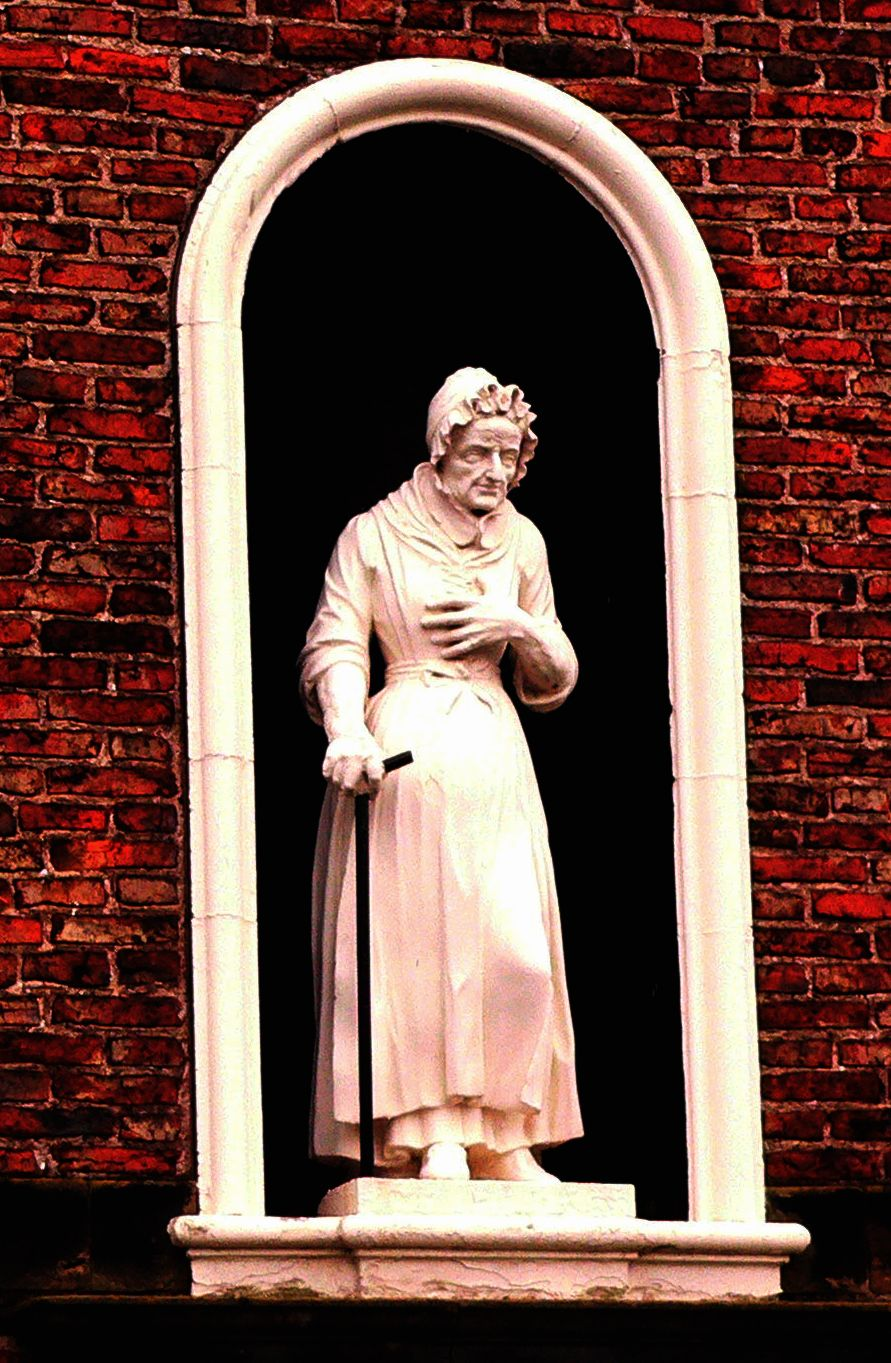
Statue of an elderly woman at the almhouses. The almshouses have been open continuously since 1676.
