= Skelton and Brotton =

Civil parish in North Yorkshire, England

Coordinates: 54°33′55″N 0°57′19″W

- Skelton Castle

- Location within North Yorkshire
- Population: 12,848 (2011 census)
- Civil parish: Skelton and Brotton
- Unitary authority: Redcar and Cleveland
- Ceremonial county: North Yorkshire
- Region: North East
- Country: England
- Sovereign state: United Kingdom
- Post town: SALTBURN-BY-THE-SEA
- Postcode district: TS12

Skelton and Brotton is a civil parish in the unitary authority area of Redcar and Cleveland, in the ceremonial county of North Yorkshire, England. It consists of the town of Skelton-in-Cleveland and village of Brotton.

The modern Skelton Castle incorporates part of the ancient stronghold of Robert de Brus who held it from Henry I. A modern church replaces the ancient one, of which there are ruins, and a fine Norman font is preserved. The large ironstone quarries have not wholly destroyed the appearance of the district. The Cleveland Hills rise sharply southward, to elevations sometimes exceeding 1,000 feet (300 m), and are scored with deep and picturesque glens. On the coast, which is cliff-bound and fine, is the watering-place of Saltburn-by-the-Sea.

== Demographics ==
Skelton and Brotton had a population of 12,848 at the 2011 Census.
