= Skelton Castle =

Building in Skelton-in-Cleveland, North Yorkshire, England

Coordinates: 54.5649°N 0.9935°W

Skelton Castle country house

Skelton Castle can refer to either a ruined medieval castle or an 18th-century Gothic style country house that replaced it. The site of both buildings is the village of Skelton, in North Yorkshire, England. The house is Grade I listed.

== Castle ==
The castle was built of stone by Robert de Brus in 1140. It had two look-out towers, dungeons, and a moat with a drawbridge and portcullis.

In 1265 it was surrendered to King Henry III. In 1272 it went to Walter de Fauconberg and remained in the family for the next 200 years. In 1490 it was inherited by William Conyers, when it was described as ruinous. From him it passed into the Trotter family and then by marriage to the Hall family by the marriage of Joseph Hall to Catherine Trotter. Their son John inherited and changed his name to Hall-Stevenson after marrying Ann Stevenson. He formed the "Demoniacks" club who met at the ruins of the castle for drinking bouts.

His son, Joseph Hall-Stevenson, died within a year of his father and thus Joseph's son John Hall-Stevenson (1766–1843) inherited the castle. In 1788 he changed his name to John Wharton and was Member of Parliament for Beverley between 1790 and 1820. He also demolished the castle and replaced it by the current country house between 1770 and 1817.

== Country house ==
The present house is built of dressed sandstone with a roof of Lakeland slate. It is a two-storey block with a 5-bay frontage. It incorporates some remains of the medieval castle. The house was built c.1770 and extended in 1810-1817 by Ignatius Bonomi.

It was constructed between 1788 and 1817 for John Wharton, Member of Parliament for Beverley who had inherited the ruined Skelton Castle from his father Joseph Hall-Stevenson in 1786. John Wharton had changed his name from Hall-Stevenson to Wharton to comply with the terms of a legacy. He inherited a considerable fortune from his aunt, much of which he spent of demolishing the castle and building his new home. He died childless and in poverty in 1843 and Skelton devolved to his nephew John Thomas Wharton of Gilling. The property then descended in the Wharton family to William Henry Anthony Wharton, High Sheriff of Yorkshire for 1925, and on his death in 1938, to his daughter Margaret Winsome Ringrose Wharton. She had married Christopher Hildyard Ringrose, a Royal Navy captain, who had added the additional surname of Wharton to that of Ringrose. She lived there until at least 1986, by which time her relative, Major Wharton, actually ran the estate on account of her age. Major Wharton died in 2026 and the future of the castle is now unknown.

== See also ==
- Skelton Castle was an East Indiaman launched in 1800 that made three voyages for the British East India Company before disappearing without a trace in 1806 on her fourth.
