= Skelton-in-Cleveland =

Town in North Yorkshire, England

Coordinates: 54.5619°N 0.9874°W

Skelton-in-Cleveland: Skelton
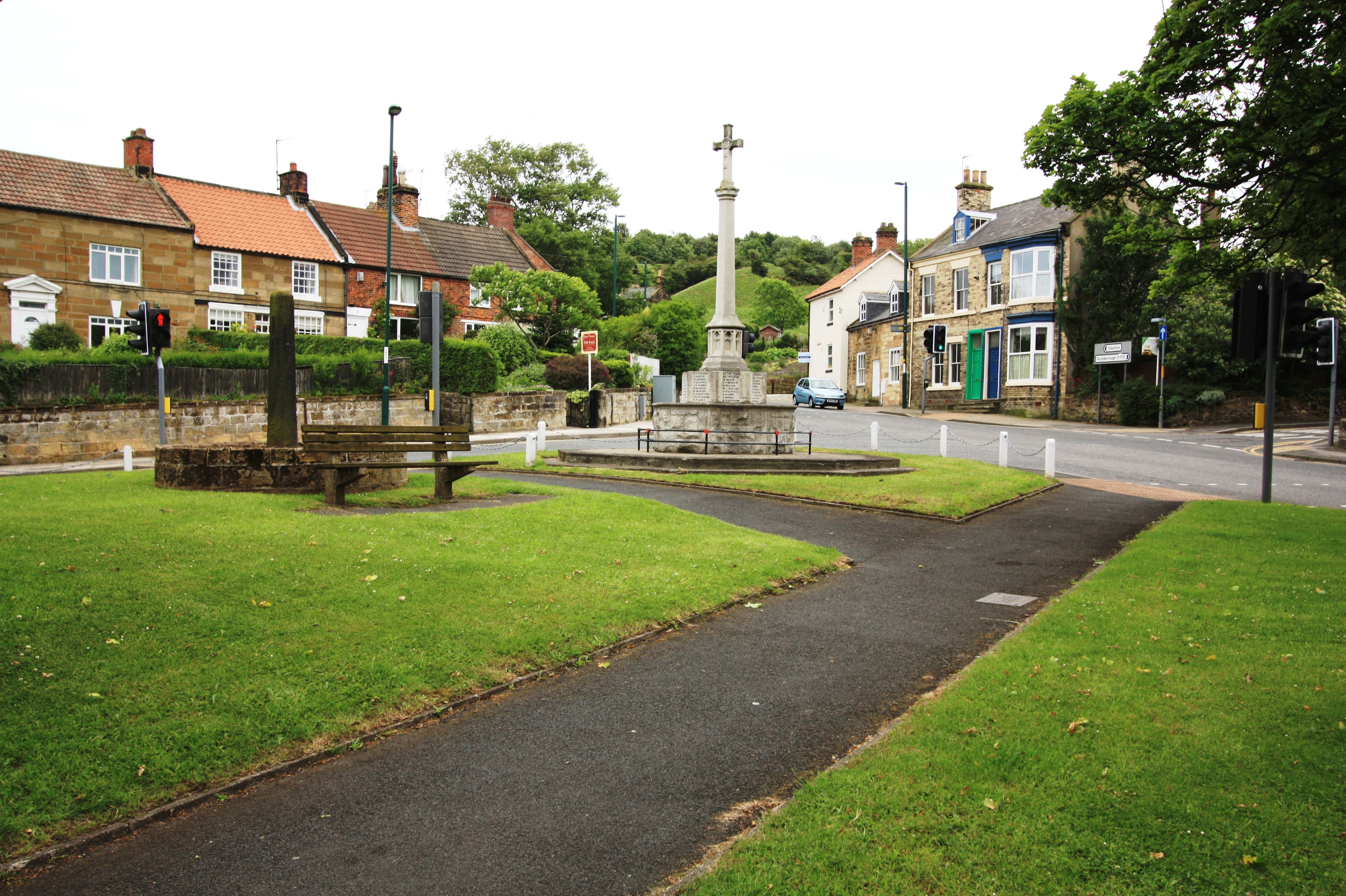
- Junction of High Street and Marske Lane

- Location within North Yorkshire
- Population: 6,535 (2011 census)
- OS grid reference: NZ655189
- Civil parish: Skelton and Brotton
- Unitary authority: Redcar and Cleveland
- Ceremonial county: North Yorkshire
- Region: North East
- Country: England
- Sovereign state: United Kingdom
- Post town: SALTBURN-BY-THE-SEA
- Postcode district: TS12
- Dialling code: 01287
- Police: Cleveland
- Fire: Cleveland
- Ambulance: North East
- UK Parliament: Middlesbrough South and East Cleveland

Skelton-in-Cleveland or Skelton is a market town in the civil parish of Skelton and Brotton at the foot of the Cleveland Hills and about 10 miles (16 km) east of Middlesbrough centre. It is in the borough of Redcar and Cleveland, North Yorkshire, England.

Skelton is made up of villages; including North Skelton, Skelton Green, and New Skelton.

The name Skelton derives from the Old English scelftūn meaning 'settlement on a shelf'.

The first real mention of Skelton is in the Domesday Book of 1086, which details taxes collected. Skelton Castle was built in the 12th century by the de Brus (Bruce) family. It is a town by market charter.

== Demographics ==
Population of the Skelton Built-up area was 6,535, at the 2011 census.

== All Saints' churches ==
Old All Saints' Church is a redundant Church of England church, built in Georgian times; it is set in parkland with views to the 18th-century Gothic-style country house called Skelton Castle. Graves can be seen in the churchyard with skull-and-crossbones motifs. The church was mostly rebuilt in 1785, on a site where two previous churches had been built.

The pulpit, the box pews and other furnishings, date from the rebuilding, with slightly earlier text boards and some older monuments on a remaining medieval wall. The outside stonework shows a herringbone tooling in keeping with local styles, in contrast to the 'Venetian' east window and the dark pink colouring of the interior.

New All Saints' Church

A new All Saints' church was built on the other side of the high street, in 1884, by R.J. Johnston of Newcastle. It is in the decorated style and of dressed sandstone with ashlar, with plain clay tiled roofs.

After the new church was built, the Georgian church fell into disrepair, declared redundant and is now maintained by the Churches Conservation Trust. Both churches are Grade II listed buildings.

== Education ==
The only school in the town is Skelton Primary School which takes in students aged 3–11.

== Media ==
Local news and television signals are provided by BBC North East and Cumbria and ITV Tyne Tees. Television signals are received from either the Bilsdale or Pontop Pike TV transmitters.

Local radio stations are BBC Radio Tees, Capital North East, Heart North East, Smooth North East, Hits Radio Teesside, Greatest Hits Radio Teesside, and Zetland FM, a community based radio station.

The town is served by these local newspapers, The Northern Echo and Teesside Live.

== Sport ==
The town has a cricket club, Skelton Castle Cricket Club, who play in the Langbaurgh cricket league. Their grounds, Old Dog Kennels; is accessible via the A174. Skelton United is the town's football club, with junior teams from U7s to U16s.

== Local amenities ==
Skelton's high street hosts various small independent/chain shops and cafes, including Co-operative Food store. There are several public houses throughout Skelton and on the edge of town there is a retail estate with retail outlets and restaurants.

== Famous son ==
Skelton-in-Cleveland was the birthplace, in 1873, of Frank Wild, polar explorer and Ernest Shackleton's right-hand man. In 2016 a statue of Wild was erected in Skelton-in-Cleveland.

== Gallery ==
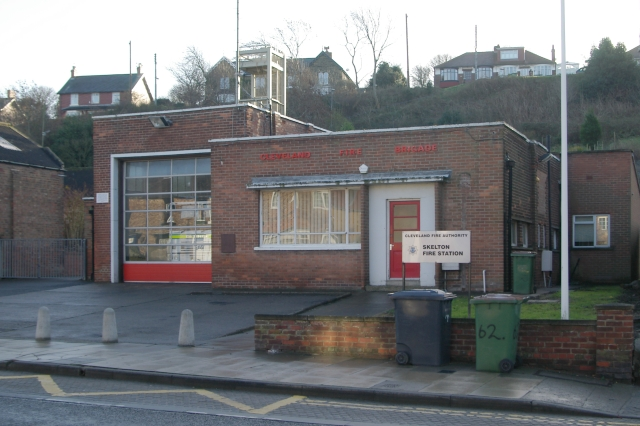
Skelton Fire Station

New housing in Skelton

Skelton Library
