= Redcar and Cleveland =

Borough in North Yorkshire, England

Borough of Redcar and Cleveland
- Unitary authority area and borough
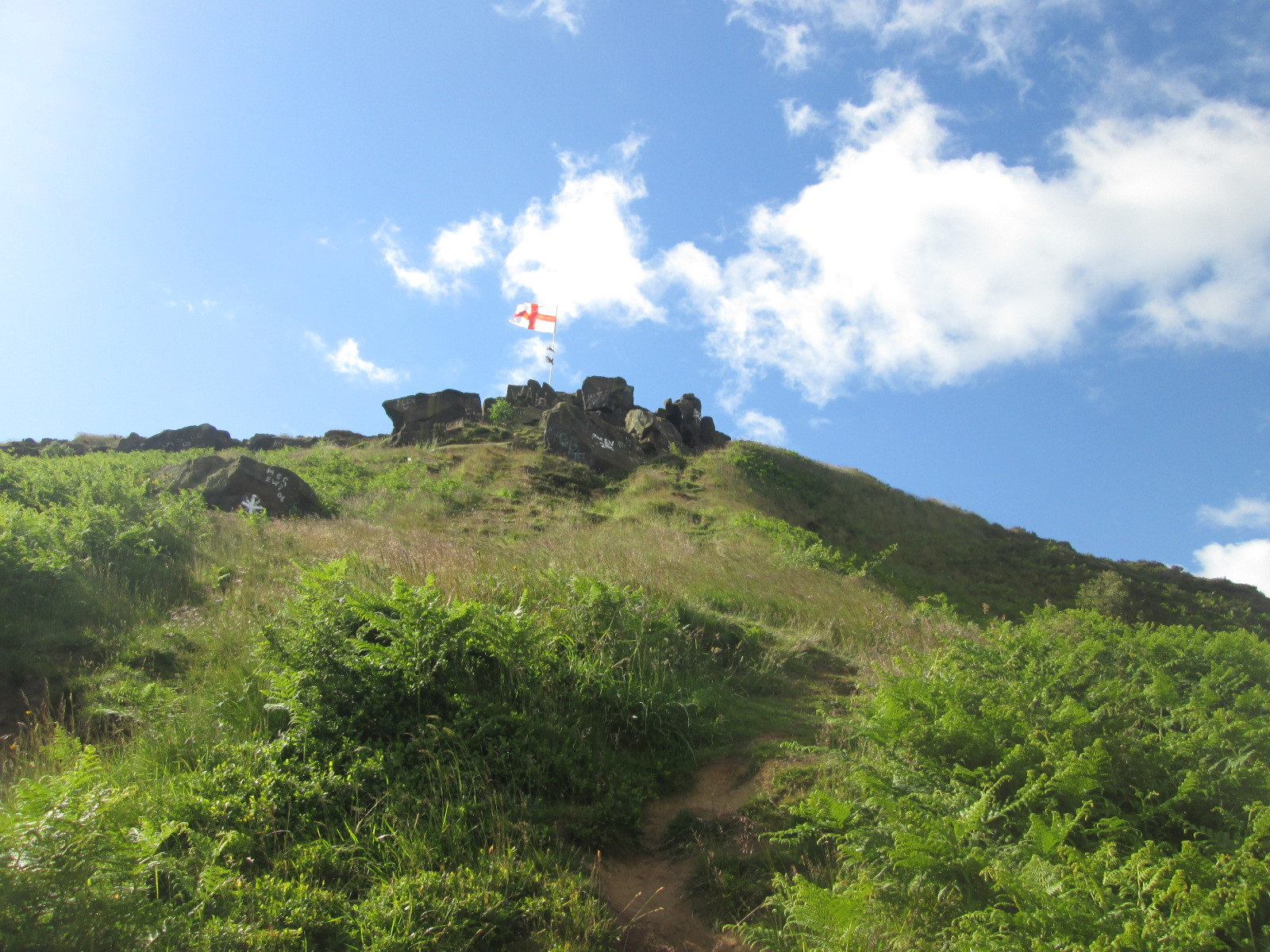
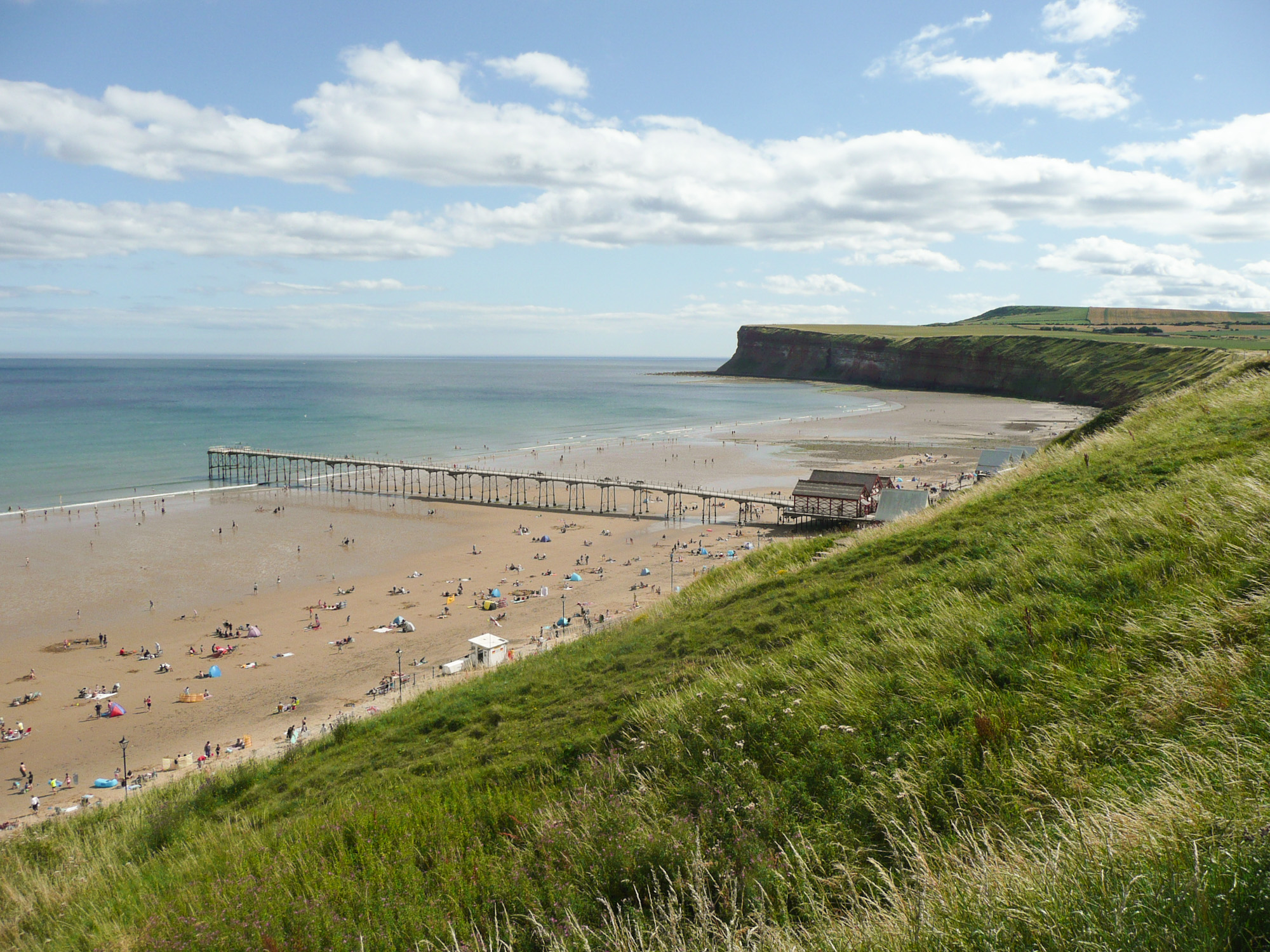
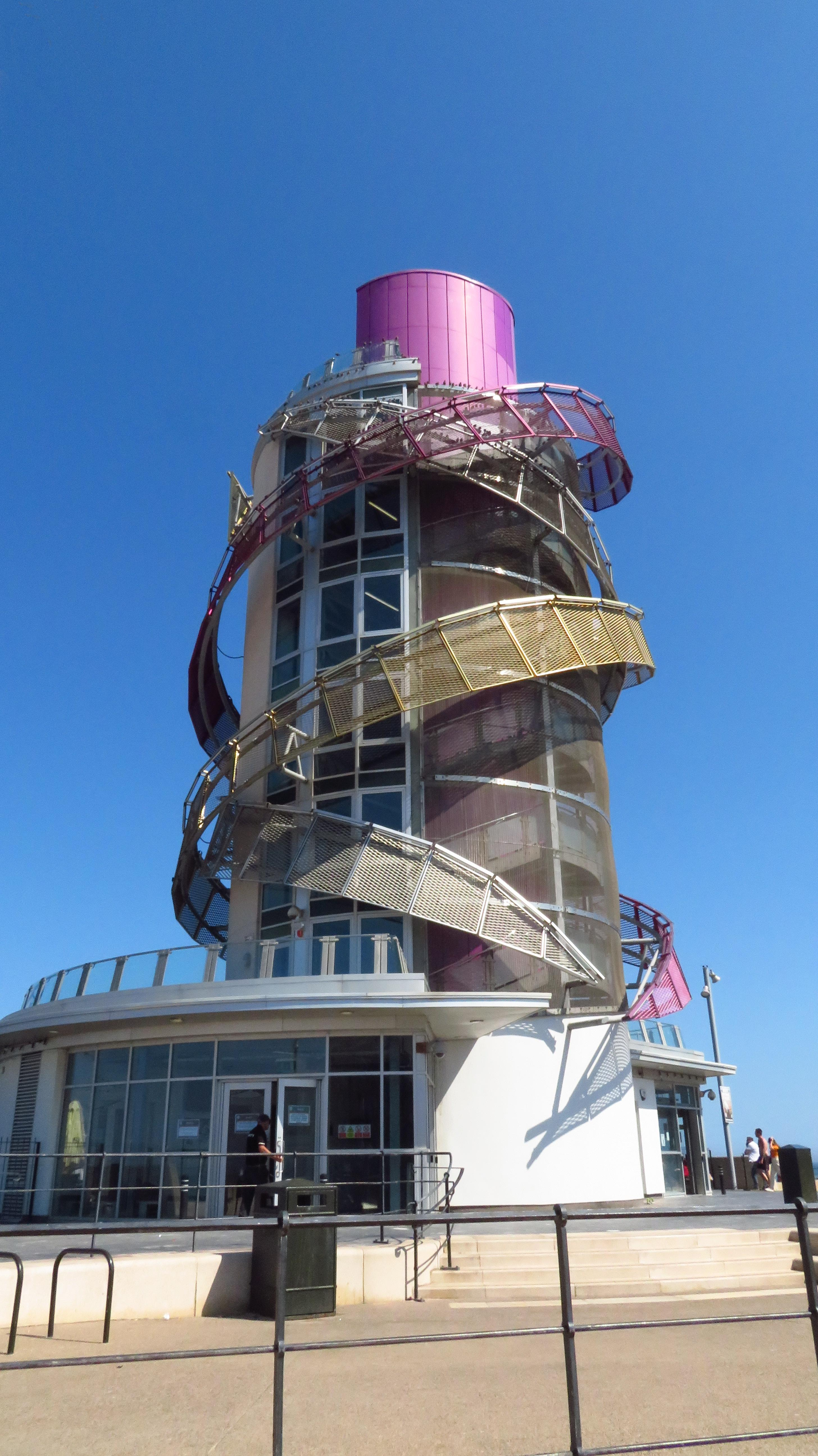
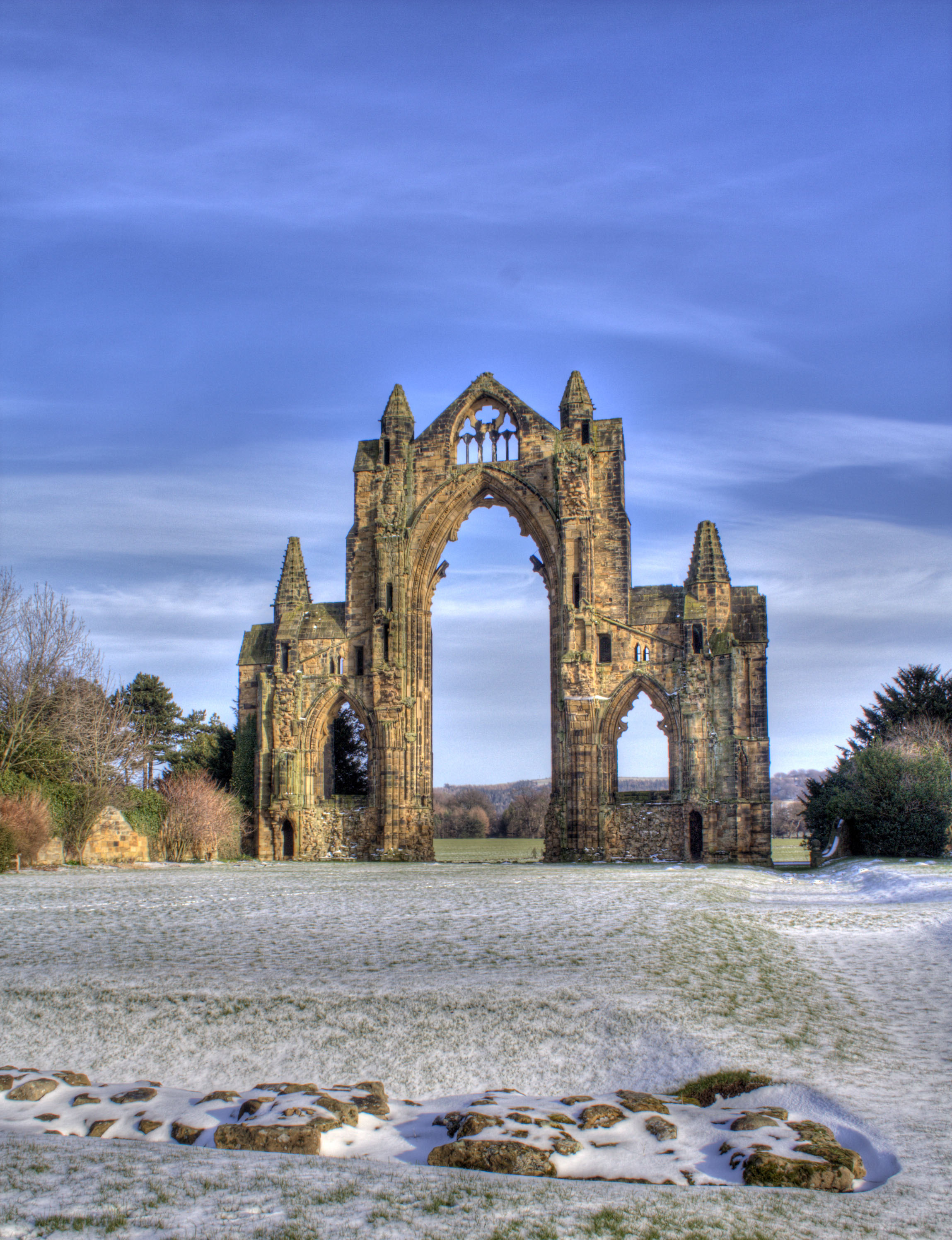
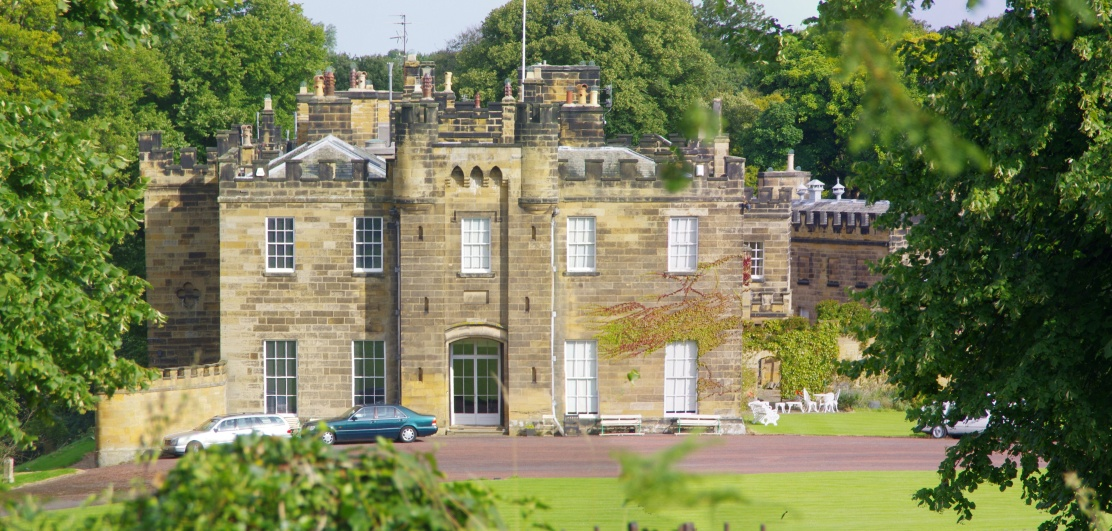
- Eston Nab Saltburn The Beacon Gisborough Priory Skelton Castle

- Coat of arms
- Motto: United We Endeavour
- Redcar and Cleveland shown within North Yorkshire
- Coordinates: 54.57923°N 1.03409°W
- Sovereign state: United Kingdom
- Country: England
- Region: North East
- Ceremonial county: North Yorkshire
- City region: Tees Valley
- Incorporated: 1 April 1974
- Unitary authority: 1 April 1996
- Named for: Redcar and Cleveland
- Administrative HQ: Redcar

Government
  - Type: Unitary authority
  - Body: Redcar and Cleveland Borough Council
  - Executive: Leader and cabinet
  - Control: No overall control
  - Leader: Alec Brown (L)
  - Mayor: Neil Bendelow
  - MPs: 2 MPs: Luke Myer (L); Anna Turley (L)

Area
  - Total: 95 sq mi (245 km^{2})
  - Rank: 135th

Population (2025)
  - Total: 139,541
  - Rank: 171st
  - Density: 1,470/sq mi (569/km^{2})

Ethnicity (2021)
  - Ethnic groups: List: 97.7% White; 0.9% Mixed; 0.8% Asian; 0.4% other; 0.2% Black

Religion (2021)
  - Religion: List: 53.0% Christianity; 40.2% no religion; 0.7% Islam; 0.2% Buddhism; 0.1% Hinduism; 0.1% Sikhism; 0.0% Judaism; 0.4% other; 5.3% not stated
- Time zone: UTC+0 (GMT)
  - Summer (DST): UTC+1 (BST)
- Postcode areas: TS
- Dialling codes: 01287
- ISO 3166 code: GB-RCC
- GSS code: E06000003
- Website: redcar-cleveland.gov.uk

Redcar and Cleveland is a unitary authority area with borough status in the ceremonial county of North Yorkshire, England. Its council has been a unitary authority since 1996.

The borough was created in 1974 as Langbaurgh, and was one of four boroughs in the non-metropolitan county of Cleveland. It was renamed Langbaurgh-on-Tees in 1988, and given its present name when Cleveland was abolished in 1996; the borough was made a unitary authority in the same year. Redcar and Cleveland is part of the Tees Valley combined authority, which also includes the boroughs of Darlington, Middlesbrough, Hartlepool and Stockton-on-Tees; the latter three were also formerly in Cleveland County.

Its main settlement is the town of Redcar. Other notable towns and villages include South Bank, Eston, Brotton, Guisborough, Greater Eston, Loftus, Saltburn-by-the-Sea and Skelton.

== History ==
The district was created in 1974 as the borough of Langbaurgh, one of four districts of the new non-metropolitan county of Cleveland. It was formed from the Coatham, Eston Grange, Kirkleatham, Ormesby, Redcar and South Bank wards of the County Borough of Teesside, along with Guisborough, Loftus, Saltburn and Marske-by-the-Sea and Skelton and Brotton urban districts, from the North Riding of Yorkshire. The borough was named after the ancient Langbaurgh wapentake of Yorkshire. On 1 January 1988 the borough was renamed Langbaurgh-on-Tees.

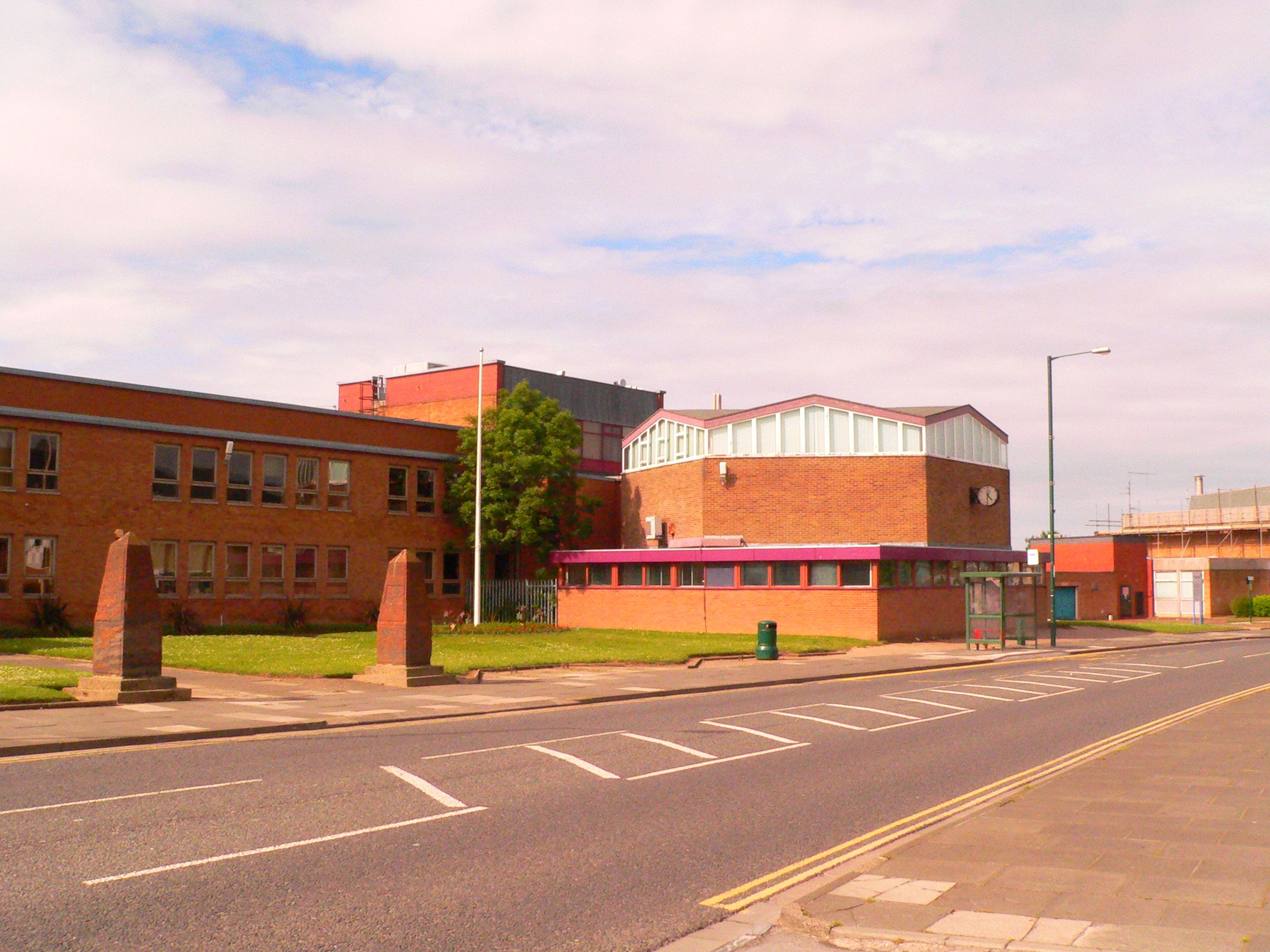
Redcar and Cleveland Town Hall on Fabian Road, Teesville

Cleveland County was abolished on 1 April 1996, with its districts becoming unitary authority areas. At this time Langbaurgh-on-Tees was renamed Redcar and Cleveland. Upon becoming a unitary authority, Langbaurgh-on-Tees Borough Council was renamed Redcar and Cleveland Borough Council and acquired all the full rights and duties as a county, whilst retaining the same boundaries as before.

== Demographics ==
The borough had a population of 135,200 in 2011.

== Economy ==
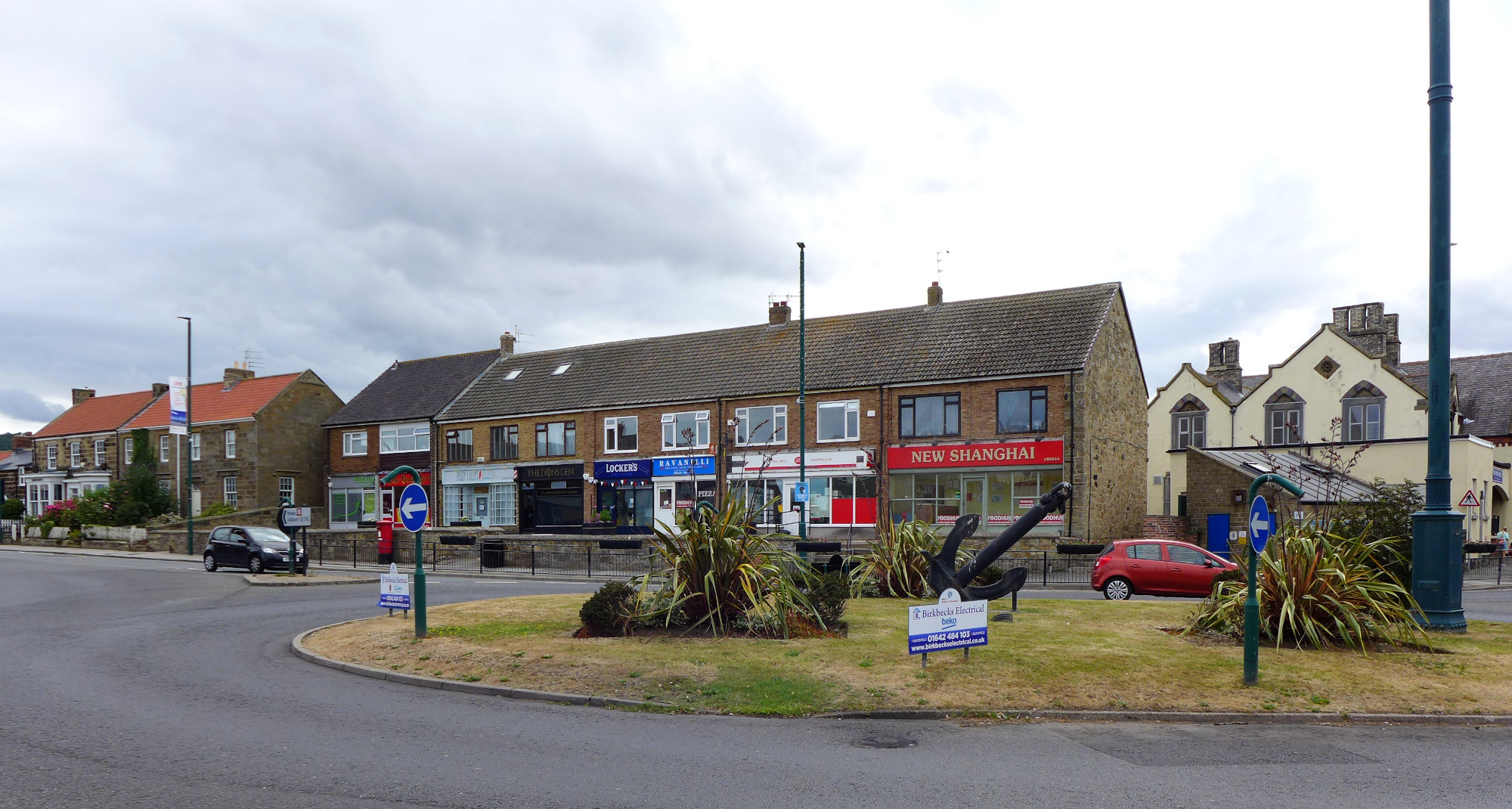
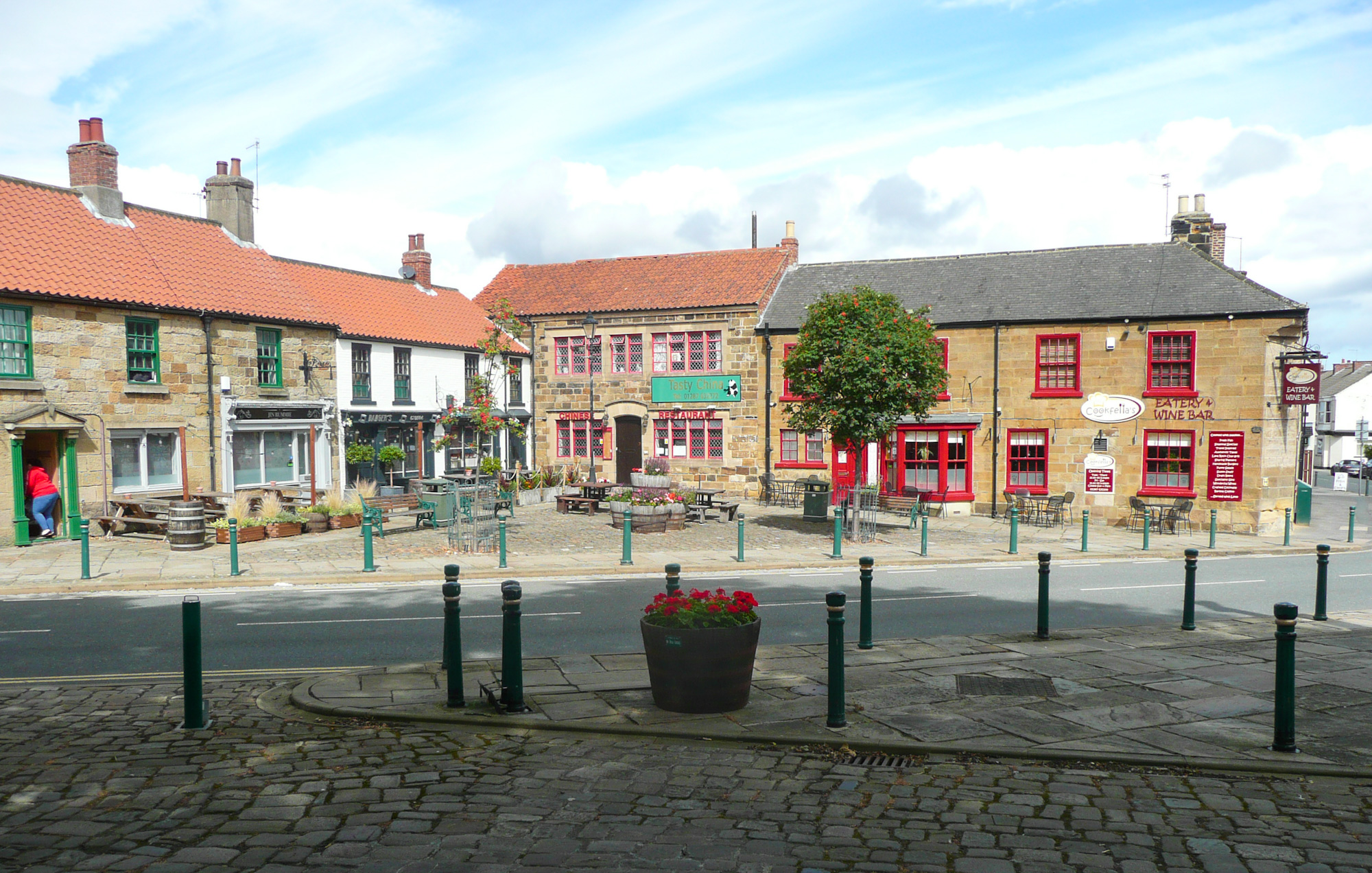
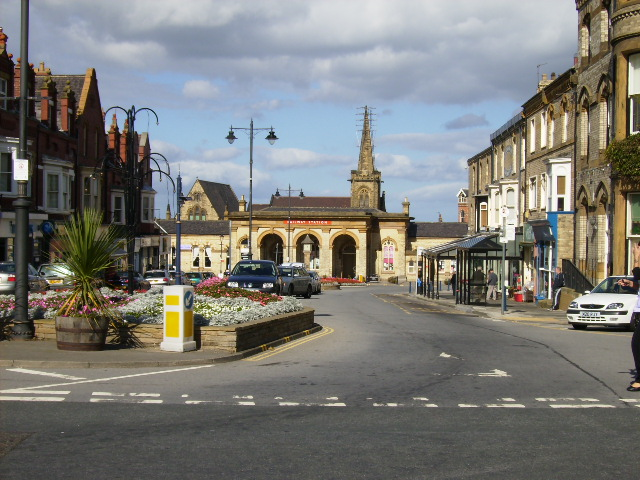
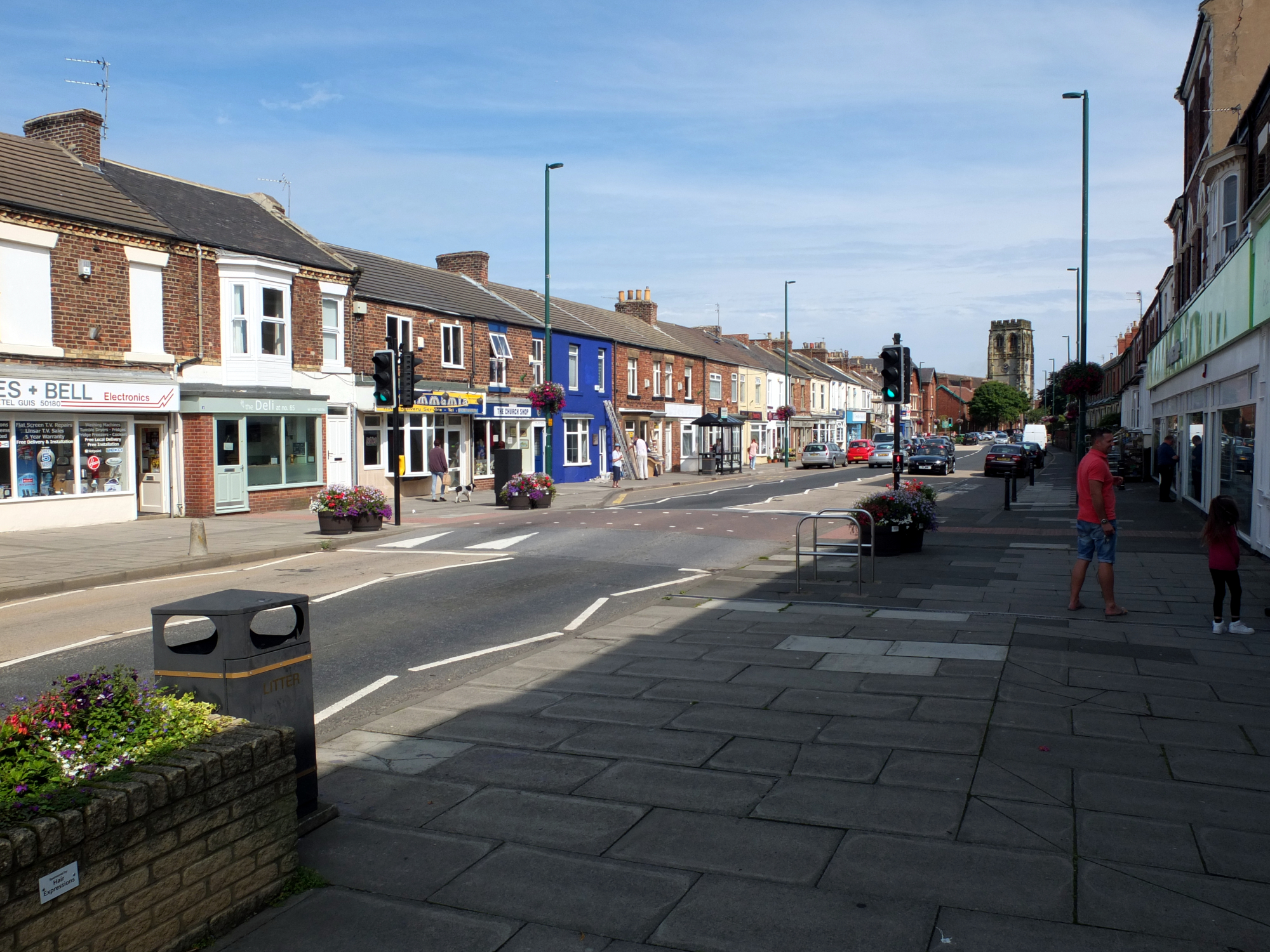
Marske's High Street, Guisborough's Church Street, Saltburn's Station Street and Skelton's High Street

This is a chart of trend of regional gross 'value added' of South Teesside at current basic prices by the Office for National Statistics with figures in millions of British Pounds Sterling.

Year	Regional Gross Value Added	Agriculture	Industry	Services
1995	2,428	9	926	1,493
2000	2,919	11	940	1,967
2003	3,167	10	970	2,187
2006	3,982	11	997	4,187

includes hunting and forestry

includes energy and construction

includes financial intermediation services indirectly measured

Components may not sum to totals due to rounding

== Local Industry ==
The main industry within the greater district of the town of Redcar is the Chemical Industry located close to Wilton village on the Chemical Industry Park known internationally as Wilton. The chemical companies are all members of the Northeast of England Process Industry Cluster (NEPIC).

The Wilton chemical site is owned by Singaporean utility company Sembcorp. Lotte Chemicals are expanding both PTA and PET production. Huntsman manufacture polyurethane intermediates and Ensus have built Europe's largest bioethanol facility. Biffa Polymers now operate a polymer recycling plant that handles up to 30% of the UKs plastic milk bottles. While in support of Sembcorp, who built the UK's first wood-fired power station (Wilton 10), UK Wood Recycling Limited have a significant facility on the site providing waste wood to fuel Wilton 10.

The Teesside Steelworks operated Europe's second largest blast furnace. The majority of the steelworks (including the Redcar blast furnace, Redcar and South Bank coke ovens and the BOS plant at Lackenby) closed in 2015, but the Teesside Beam Mill still operates, producing beams for the construction industry.

== Social housing ==
=== Coast and Country Housing Limited ===
Coast and Country took over the ownership and management of homes from Redcar and Cleveland Borough Council in July 2002. In addition to providing core housing services the company has also invested in independent living services, including the development of a new Telecare service in partnership with the Borough Council.

=== Beyond Housing ===
In 2018, Coast and Country merged with Yorkshire Coast Homes to form Beyond Housing Limited, a Community Benefit Society with 15,000 properties across Teesside and North Yorkshire.

== Local nature reserves ==
The council maintains a number of Local nature reserves. These are Guisborough Branch Walkway, Flatts Lane Woodland Country Park and Rosecroft Wood, Loftus Wood, Whitecliff Wood, Clarksons Wood, Errington Wood and Eston Moor.

== Towns and parishes ==
There are five civil parishes in the borough. The parish councils for Guisborough and Loftus have declared their parishes to be towns, allowing them to take the style "town council". The north-west of the borough, corresponding to the parts that were in the County Borough of Teesside between 1968 and 1974 (including Redcar and Eston and adjoining areas), is an unparished area. The parishes are:

- Guisborough
- Lockwood
- Loftus
- Saltburn, Marske and New Marske
- Skelton and Brotton

== Wards ==
As of 2024, the borough has 24 wards represented by 59 councillors. These are named: Belmont, Brotton, Coatham, Dormanstown, Eston, Grangetown, Guisborough, Hutton, Kirkleatham, Lockwood, Loftus, Longbeck, Newcomen, Normanby, Ormesby, Saltburn, Skelton East, Skelton West, South Bank, St Germain's, Teesville, West Dyke, Wheatlands, and Zetland.

== Town twinning ==
Redcar and Cleveland is twinned with:

- Troisdorf, Germany, since 1990
