= Stanley Hollis =

British recipient of the Victoria Cross (1912–1972)

Stanley Elton Hollis
- Born: 21 September 1912; Middlesbrough, North Riding of Yorkshire, England
- Died: 8 February 1972 (aged 59); Liverton Mines, North Riding of Yorkshire
- Burial place: Acklam Cemetery, Middlesbrough; 54.5366°N 1.2417°W
- Military career
- Allegiance: United Kingdom
- Branch: British Army
- Service years: 1939–1944
- Rank: Warrant Officer Class 2
- Service number: 4390973
- Unit: Green Howards
- Conflicts: World War II
- Awards: Victoria Cross

Stanley Elton Hollis VC (21 September 1912 – 8 February 1972) was an English recipient of the Victoria Cross, the highest and most prestigious award for gallantry in the face of the enemy that can be awarded to British and Commonwealth forces.

He had the distinction of receiving the only Victoria Cross awarded for actions on D-Day (6 June 1944).

== Early life ==
Stanley Hollis was born in Middlesbrough, North Riding of Yorkshire, England, where he lived and attended the local school until 1926. Then his parents (Edith and Alfred Hollis) moved to Robin Hood's Bay, where he worked in his father's fish and chip shop.

In 1929 he was apprenticed to a Whitby shipping company, to learn to be a Navigation Officer. He made regular voyages to West Africa, but in 1930 fell ill with blackwater fever, which ended his merchant navy career. Returning to North Ormesby, Middlesbrough, he worked as a lorry driver, and married Alice Clixby, with whom he had a son and a daughter.

== Military career ==
In 1939 he enlisted in the Territorial Army, part of the British Army, in the 4th Battalion, Green Howards. At the outbreak of the Second World War he was mobilised and transferred to the 6th Battalion, Green Howards, and went to France as part of the British Expeditionary Force in 1940, where he served as the commanding officer's despatch rider. He was promoted from lance corporal to sergeant during the evacuation from Dunkirk. He then fought from El Alamein to Tunis as part of the British Eighth Army in the North African Campaign. He was made company sergeant major shortly before the invasion of Sicily in 1943, where he was wounded at the battle of Primosole Bridge.

On D-Day, the 6th Green Howards landed on Gold Beach. As his company moved inland from the beaches after the initial landings, Hollis went with his company commander to investigate two German pillboxes which had been by-passed. He rushed the first, taking all but five of the occupants prisoner; and then dealt with the second, taking 26 prisoners. He next cleared a neighbouring trench. Later that day, he led an unsuccessful attack on an enemy position containing a field gun and multiple MG 42 machine guns. After withdrawing, he learned that two of his men had been left behind. He said to his commanding officer, Major Lofthouse, "I took them in. I will try to get them out."

In September 1944 he was wounded in the leg and evacuated to England, where he was decorated by King George VI on 10 October 1944.

=== Citation ===
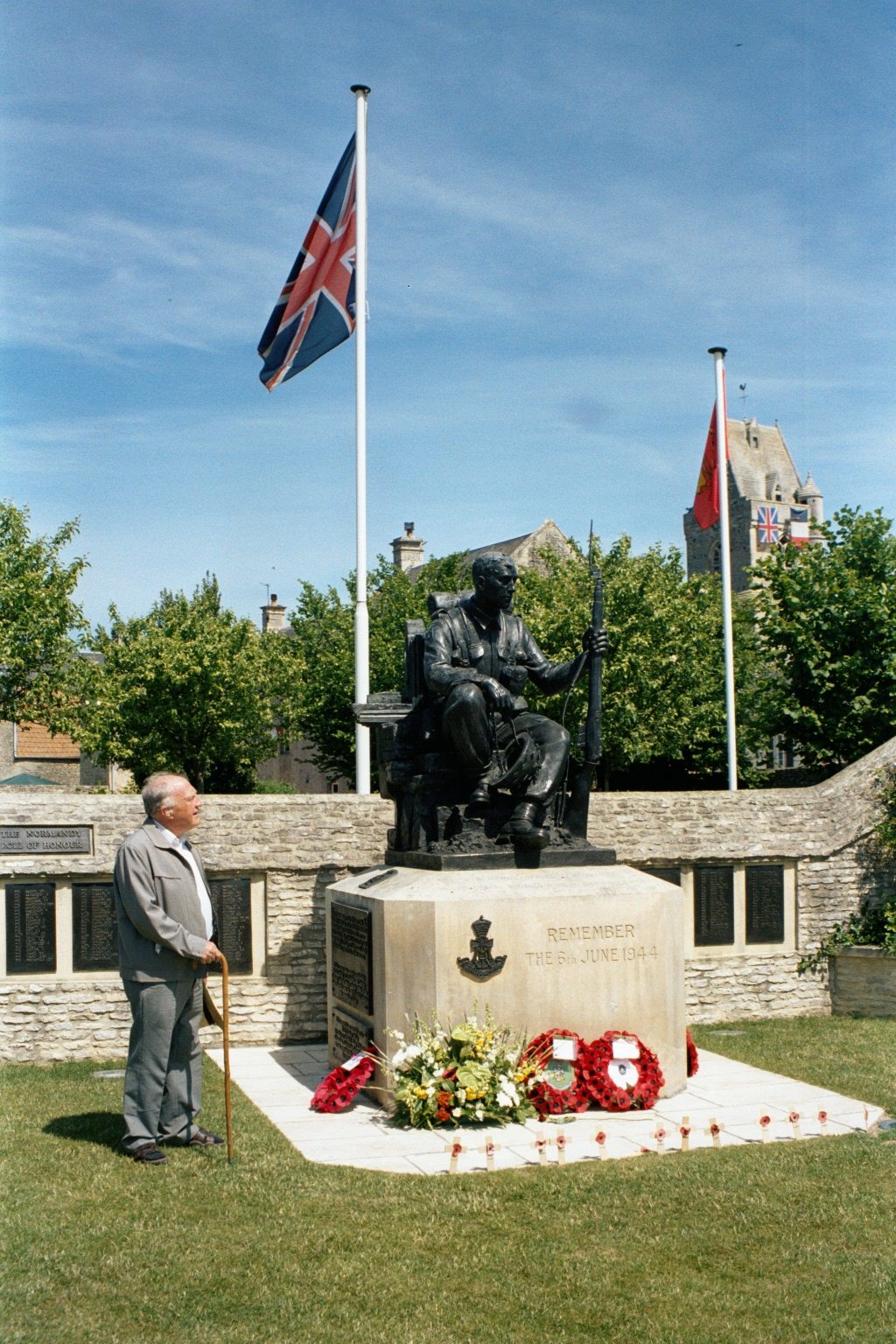
Green Howards Memorial, Crépon

The citation published in the London Gazette read:

In Normandy on 6th June, 1944, during the assault on the beaches and the Mont Fleury Battery, C.S.M. Hollis's Company Commander noticed that two of the pill-boxes had been by-passed, and went with C.S.M. Hollis to see that they were clear. When they were 20 yards from the pillbox, a machine-gun opened fire from the slit and C.S.M. Hollis instantly rushed straight at the pillbox, firing his Sten gun. He jumped on top of the pillbox, re-charged his magazine, threw a grenade in through the door and fired his Sten gun into it, killing two Germans and taking the remainder prisoner. He then cleared several Germans from a neighbouring trench. By his action, he undoubtedly saved his Company from being fired on heavily from the rear and enabled them to open the main beach exit.

Later the same day, in the village of Crepon, the Company encountered a field gun and crew armed with Spandaus at 100 yards range. C.S.M. Hollis was put in command of a party to cover an attack on the gun, but the movement was held up. Seeing this, C.S.M. Hollis pushed right forward to engage the gun with a P.I.A.T. from a house at 50 yards range. He was observed by a sniper who fired and grazed his right cheek, and at the same moment the gun swung round and fired into the house. To avoid the fallen masonry C.S.M. Hollis moved his party to an alternative position. Two of the enemy gun crew had by this time been killed and the gun was destroyed shortly afterwards. He later found that two of his men had stayed behind in the house and immediately volunteered to get them out. In full view of the enemy who were continually firing at him, he went forward alone using a Bren gun to distract their attention from the other men. Under cover of his diversion, the two men were able to get back.

Wherever fighting was heaviest, C.S.M. Hollis appeared and in the course of a magnificent day's work, he displayed the utmost gallantry and on two separate occasions his courage and initiative prevented the enemy from holding up the advance at critical stages. It was largely through his heroism and resource that the Company's objectives were gained and casualties were not heavier, and by his own bravery he saved the lives of many of his men.

== Later life ==
After the war, he worked for a time as a sandblaster in a local steelworks. He then became a partner in a motor repair business in Darlington, before becoming a ship's engineer from 1950 to 1955. He next trained as a publican, and ran the 'Albion' public house in Market Square, North Ormesby: the pub's name was changed to 'The Green Howard'. After the pub was demolished in 1970, he moved to become the tenant of the 'Holywell View' public house at Liverton Mines near Loftus.

He died on 8 February 1972, and was laid to rest in Acklam Cemetery, Middlesbrough.

== Legacy ==
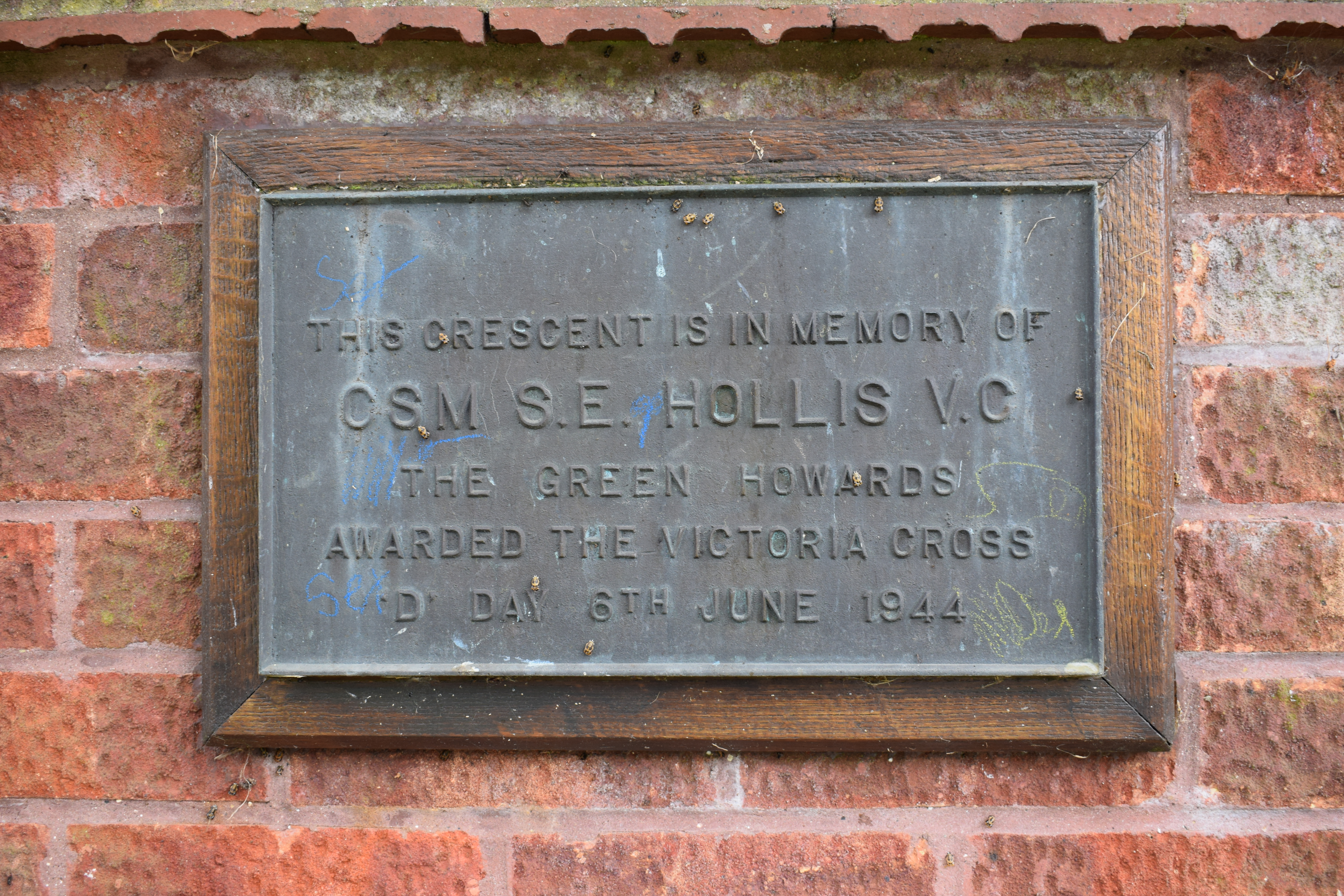
CSM Holis Crescent plaque

Hollis Crescent, a military accommodation estate, was named after him in the 1980s/90s in Strensall, North Yorkshire. A memorial plaque was put on the side of number 2 Hollis Crescent to commemorate his Victoria Cross.

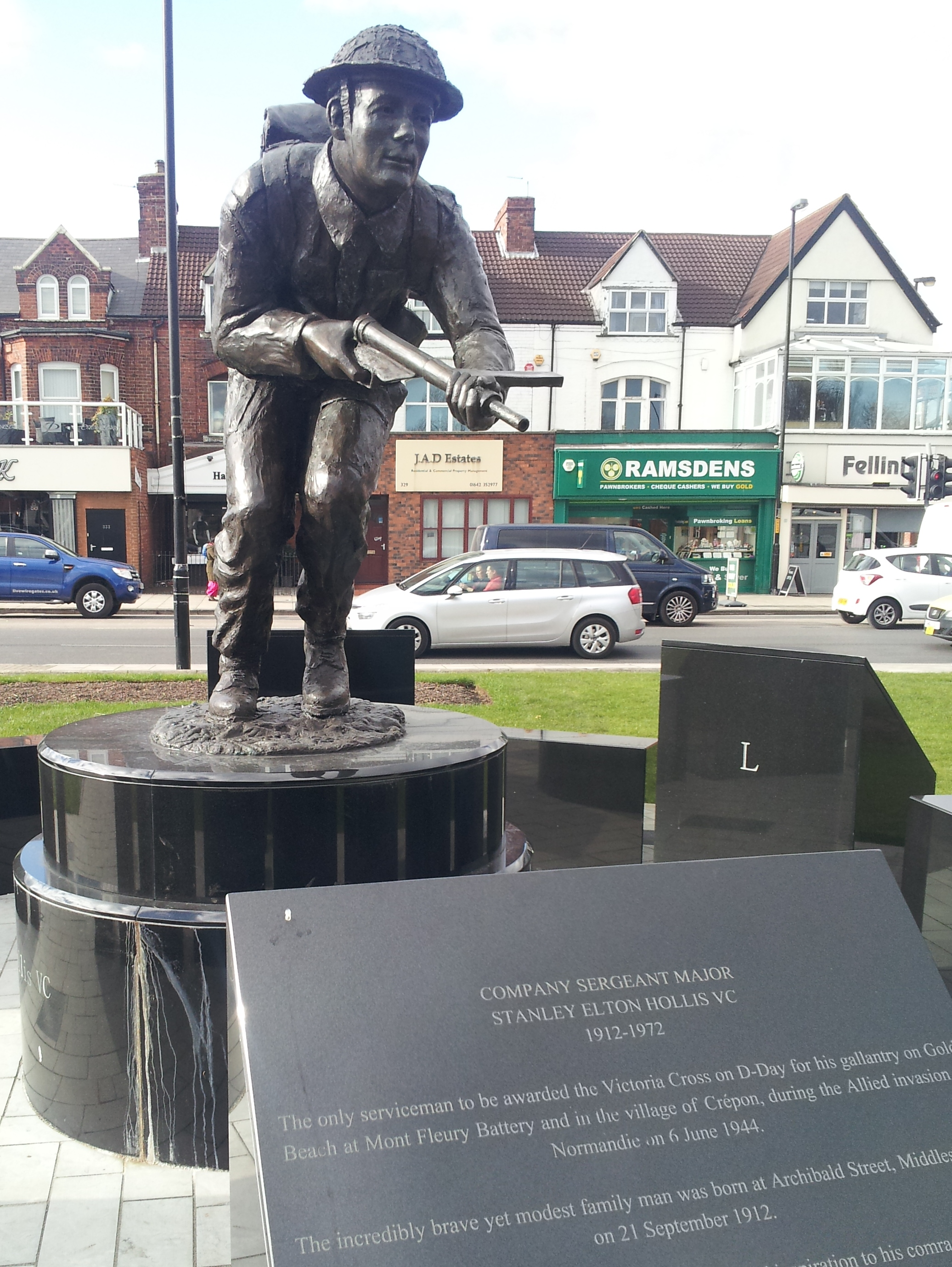
Statue in Middlesbrough

A statue honouring him, sculpted by Brian Alabaster ARBS, was unveiled on 26 November 2015 by Vice Lord Lieutenant of North Yorkshire, Peter Scrope. The walk-in memorial is located close to the Middlesbrough cenotaph outside the gates of Albert Park in front of the Dorman Museum.

Another statue of Stanley Hollis was erected in Crépon, Normandy, France near the Green Howard Pub. Hollis Court, a retired/sheltered accommodation complex in Coulby Newham, Middlesbrough, is named after him. His Victoria Cross was bought by medal collector Sir Ernest Harrison OBE, chairman of Racal and Vodafone. Harrison presented the medal to the Green Howards Regimental Museum in Richmond, North Yorkshire in 1997. Ten years later, he purchased, for the Green Howards, the Normandy hut which Hollis had attacked.

In 2016, a school in Middlesbrough that converted to academy status, was named Hollis Academy in his honour.

== Bibliography ==
- John, Laffin (1997). British VCs of World War 2: A Study in Heroism. Sutton Publishing. ISBN 0-7509-1026-7.
- D-day Victoria Cross: Story of Sergeant Major Stanley Hollis, VC (Philip Wilkinson, 1997)
- Monuments to Courage (David Harvey, 1999)
- The Register of the Victoria Cross (This England, 1997)
- Morgan, Mike (2004). D-Day Hero; CSM Stanley Hollis VC. Stroud: Sutton. ISBN 0-7509-3694-0.
- Whitworth, Alan (2012). Yorkshire VCs. Barnsley: Pen & Sword. ISBN 978-1-84884-778-1.
