= Northcliffe House =

House in Filey, North Yorkshire, England

Coordinates: 54°12′35″N 0°17′10″W

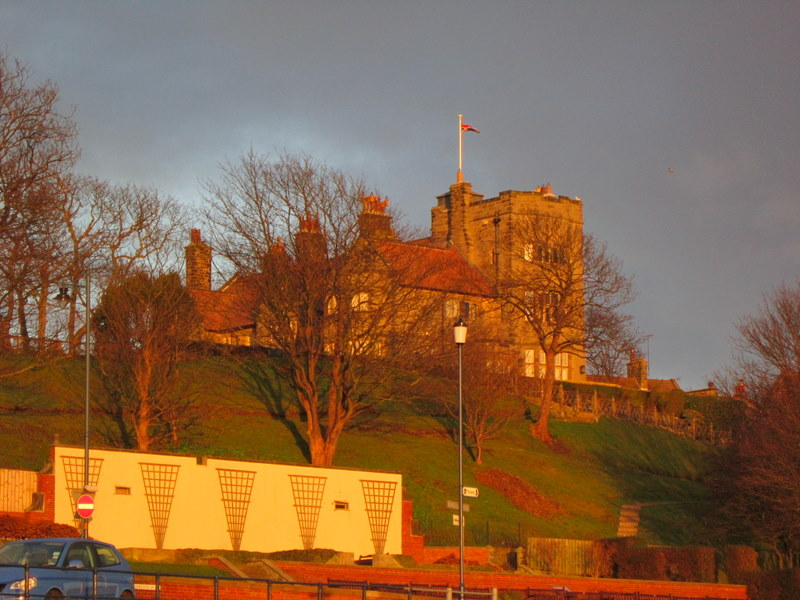
The building, in 2012

Northcliffe House is a historic building in Filey, a town in North Yorkshire, in England.

The original Northcliffe House was built for the wine merchant William Voase, in about 1830, and it was greatly extended in the late 1840s. In 1890, it was purchased by E. Clarke, who commissioned Walter Brierley to demolish the existing building and construct a new house. This was completed in 1892, and is in the Jacobethan style. In 1925, the house was purchased by the National Union of Printing, Bookbinding and Paper Workers, which used it as a convalescent home for its members. It later sold the house for conversion into apartments. The rear part of the gardens, containing an orangery, was sold off to become the public Northcliffe Gardens, while the orangery was demolished. The building was grade II listed in 1985.

The house is built of sandstone, with a moulded floor band, and a tile roof with coped gables and ball finials. It has two storeys and attics, and a front of five bays. The porch has a basket arch, over which is a dated cartouche and an embattled parapet. The right bay is gabled and contains a canted bay window with an embattled parapet. The windows are mullioned, those in the ground floor also with transoms, and there are 20th-century dormers. At the rear is a three-storey embattled tower, and a three-storey canted bay window. The former service range includes a kitchen with a conical roof. Some Arts and Crafts-style wrought iron fittings survive.

== See also ==
- Listed buildings in Filey
