= St Mary's Church, Filey =

Church building in Filey, North Yorkshire, England

Coordinates: 54°12′25″N 0°17′16″W

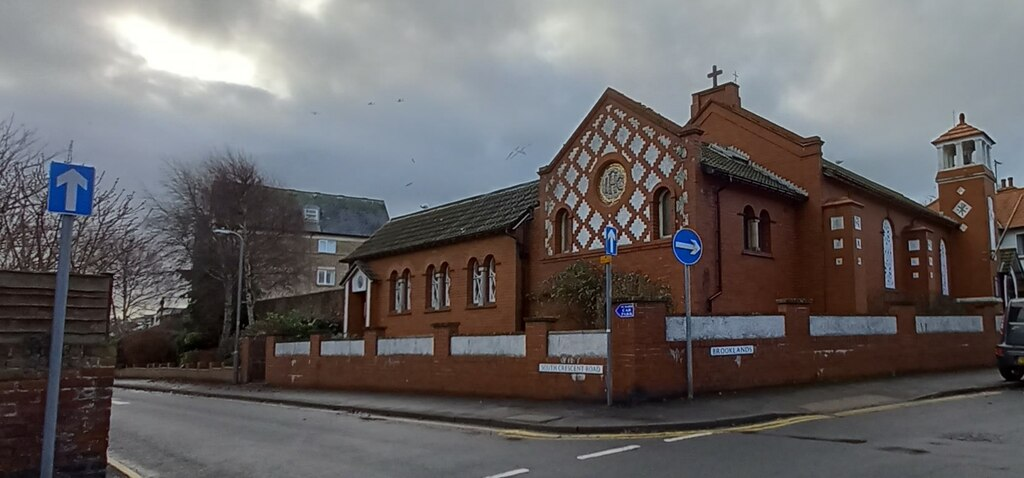
The church, in 2021

St Mary's Church is a Catholic parish church in Filey, a town in North Yorkshire, in England.

The church was constructed in 1906, to house a mission led by Eugene Roulin. He worked with the architect Andrew Prentice, who designed the building. A presbytery was added in 1910, and a transept was added to the church in 1961. In 2002 a parish hall was added on the north side of the church. The building was grade II listed in 2015.

The church is built of red Ruabon brick, with white rendered panels, and a buff tiled roof. It consists of a nave, a west chapel, a chancel, a long south transept, and a north porch and campanile. The campanile is in Italianate style, and has panels with symbols, an open bell stage, and a pyramidal roof with a pineapple finial. The nave windows are round-arched with imposts and keystones, and the tracery is in cast concrete. On the front are buttresses with panels containing symbols. The east end has brick diapering and rendering, and contains a mosaic roundel.

== See also ==
- Listed buildings in Filey
