= Royal Crescent Court =

Building in Filey, North Yorkshire, England

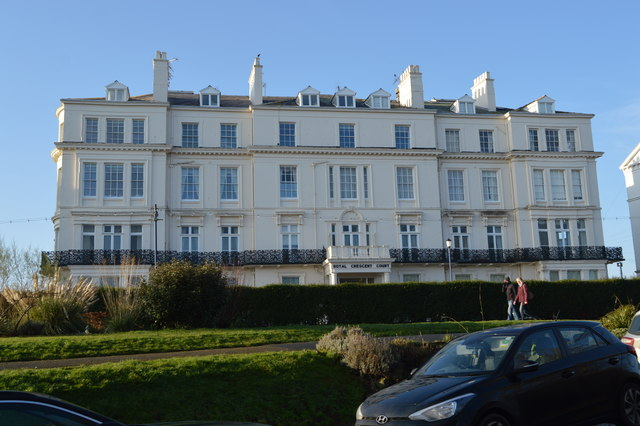
The building, in 2016

Royal Crescent Court is a historic building in Filey, a town in North Yorkshire, in England.

The building lies on The Crescent, and was one of three built as an addition to the original design. Nikolaus Pevsner describes it as "the most prestigious building in The Crescent". It was completed in 1853, and served as a hotel. It was initially leased by Edwin Taylor, who operated it as Taylor's Crescent Hotel, but in the mid-1880s it became the Royal Crescent Hotel. Early guests included the Archbishop of York and Lord John Russell, while Leopold II of Belgium ate at the hotel. It was taken over by the British Army during World War II but reopened after the war, and in the early 1950s was taken over by the Frederick Group. However, it was closed in about 1955 and converted into apartments. The building was grade II listed in 1985.

The building is constructed of stuccoed brick, with a sill band, a modillion cornice, a moulded eaves cornice, and a hipped slate roof. There are four storeys, a basement and attics, and five bays, the middle and outer bays projecting. In the centre is a portico with paired Doric columns and a balustrade, above which is a Venetian window with a keystone, and a tripartite window. Flanking the portico are continuous wrought iron balconies. The windows in the first floor have cornices with detached consoles. In the returns are four-storey bow windows. In front of the building, and on the sides, are cast iron railings on a low stone plinth, and there are four cast iron lamp pedestals.

== See also ==
- Listed buildings in Filey
