= The Foords Hotel =

Listed pub in North Yorkshire, England

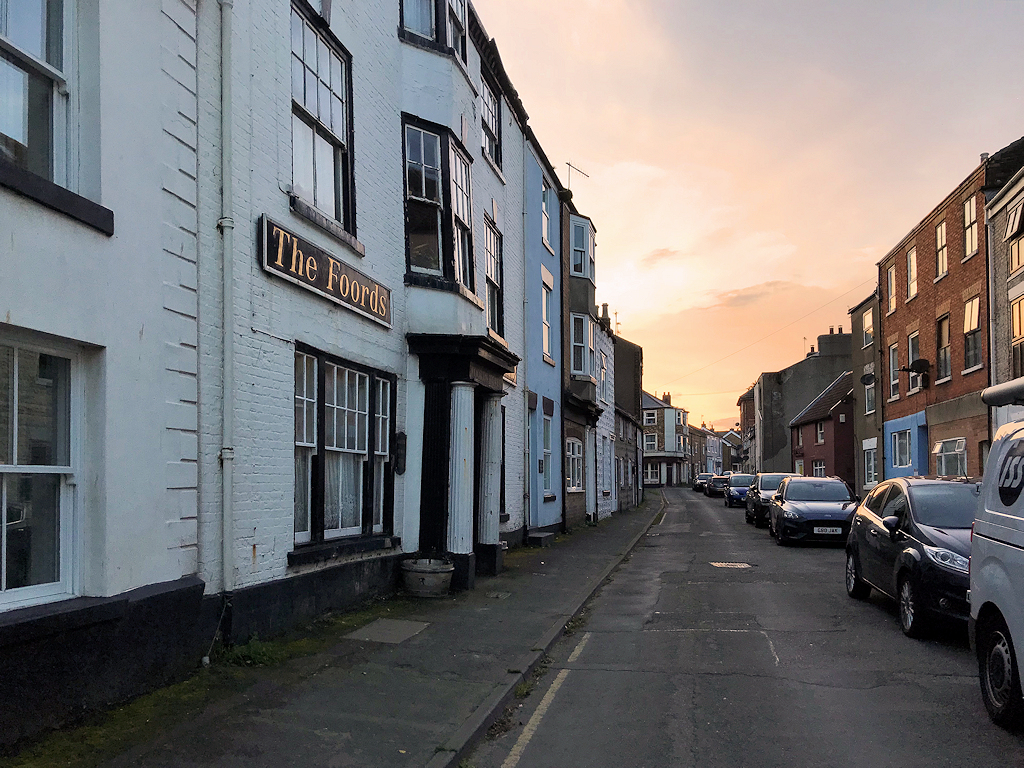
- The pub in 2023
- Interactive map of the The Foords Hotel area
- Former names: New Inn

General information
- Type: Public house
- Location: 76 Queen Street, Filey, North Yorkshire, England
- Coordinates: 54.2109°N 0.2857°W
- Year built: c. 1815; 211 years ago

Design and construction
- Designations

Listed Building – Grade II
- Official name: The Foords Hotel
- Designated: 24 October 1950
- Reference no.: 1167845

The Foords Hotel is a historic public house on Queen Street in Filey, a town in North Yorkshire, England.

The building was constructed in about 1815, to serve early visitors to the seaside resort. It was initially named the "New Inn", but was later renamed after Thomas and Mary Foord, who ran the pub. During the 19th century it occasionally also served as the town's coroners' court. The pub has a long association with the town's fishing industry, and the last two cobles are laid up around the back of the building. The pub also operates as a bed and breakfast. The building has been Grade II listed since 1960.

The pub is built of whitewashed brick on a stone plinth, with stone dressings, a modillion eaves cornice and a slate roof. There are three storeys, three bays and a rear wing. The central doorway has attached Doric fluted columns, an entablature and a cornice, above which is a two-storey canted bay window. On the ground floor are tripartite windows, and above are sash windows, those on the middle floor with wedge lintels and keystones.

== See also ==
- Listed buildings in Filey
