= Coast & Country Housing Limited =

- Industry: Social Housing
- Founded: 2001
- Headquarters: NE England
- Website: coastandcountryhousing.org.uk

Coast and Country was a Registered Housing Provider located in the north of England.

Established on 18 April 2001, the company was a 'not for profit' company limited by guarantee and regulated by the Tenant Services Authority.

As of 2017 the Chief Executive is Iain Sim. The company is controlled by a board of 15 members consisting of Tenant Board Members, Independent Board Members and Local Authority Board Members.

The company closed on 7 May 2015.

== Services ==
Established in 2001, Coast & Country is the largest registered housing provider in Redcar and Cleveland. Its current rental housing stock totals over 10,500 properties (2018) with estates located in a diverse range of urban areas, seaside resorts and rural villages. It took over the ownership and management of homes from Redcar and Cleveland Borough Council in July 2002.

== Regeneration projects ==
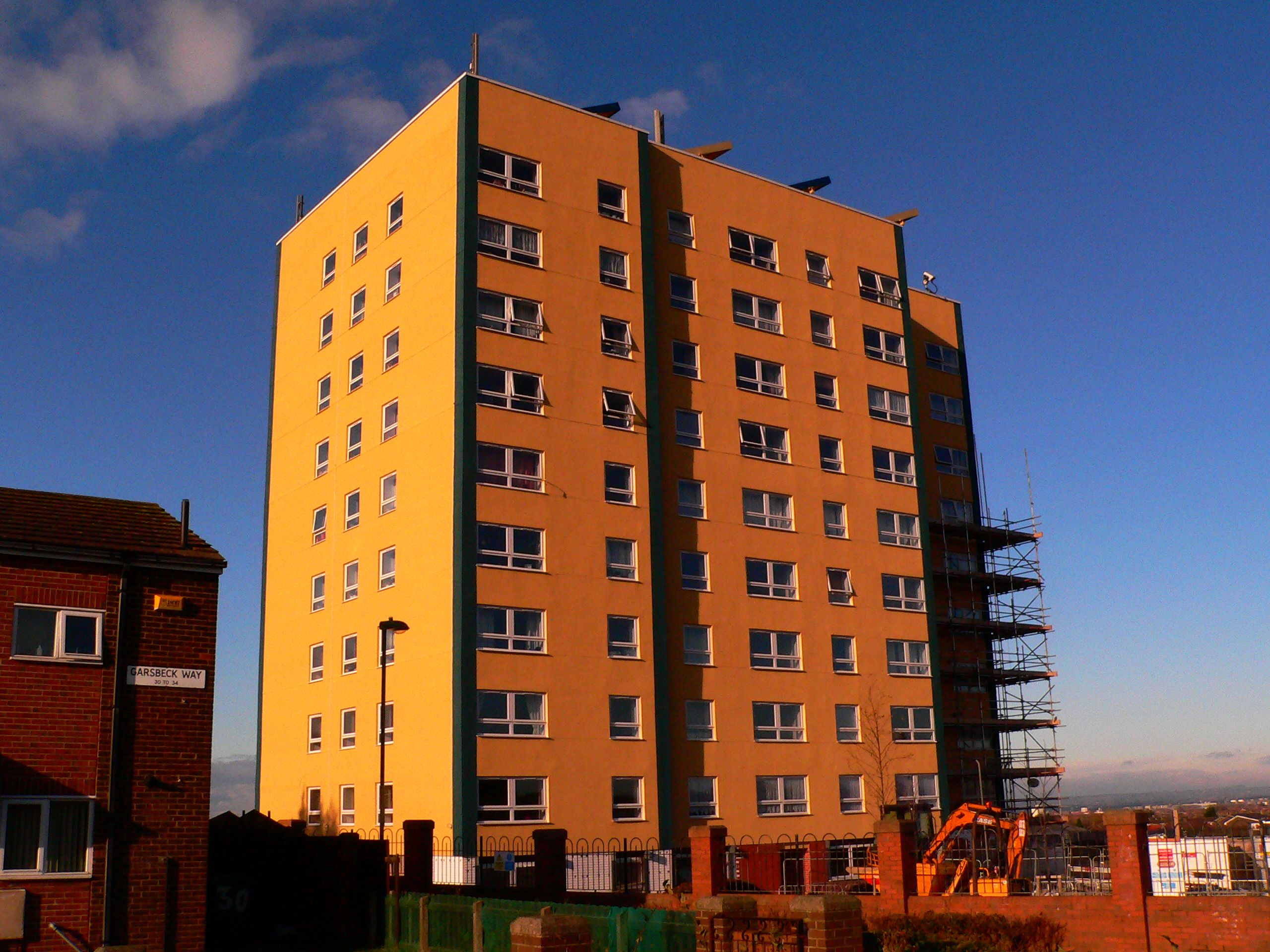
Spencerbeck House after its refurbishment

The company is also pursuing a regeneration and development program which will see multimillion-pound investment in the regeneration of several estates within Redcar and Cleveland including Blayberry/Burnmoor Estate, Redcar and the Westfield Estate, Loftus as well as developments further afield in Filey and Middlesbrough.

=== Energy efficiency projects ===
Coast & Country, is investing £1.5 million in making nearly 100 homes more energy efficient and economical to run. Three blocks, comprising 72 flats, at Barley Hill Close, Normanby, are to undergo a series of environmental improvement work. This will include external wall insulation, new windows, new roof coverings and solar panels, which will power the lifts and lights in the communal areas and the installation of one communal satellite dish.

=== Spencerbeck House ===
Another block of flats, Spencerbeck House, taken over by Coast & Country Housing in 2002, had only undergone minimal internal work since it was built three decades ago.

Extensive building and modernization work, which includes new high performance thermal windows, solar panels, rewiring throughout the property, complete external re-cladding and energy efficient heating systems, was completed early in 2011, along with internal fittings including kitchen units and new bathroom fixtures.

== New housing ==
In 2011, Coast & Country secured planning permission to build 300 new homes in Filey at a cost of £45 million. As the town was hit by floods twice in the 2000s, the development is conditional on not increasing flood risk to existing homes.
