= Loftus Town Hall =

Municipal building in Loftus, North Yorkshire, England

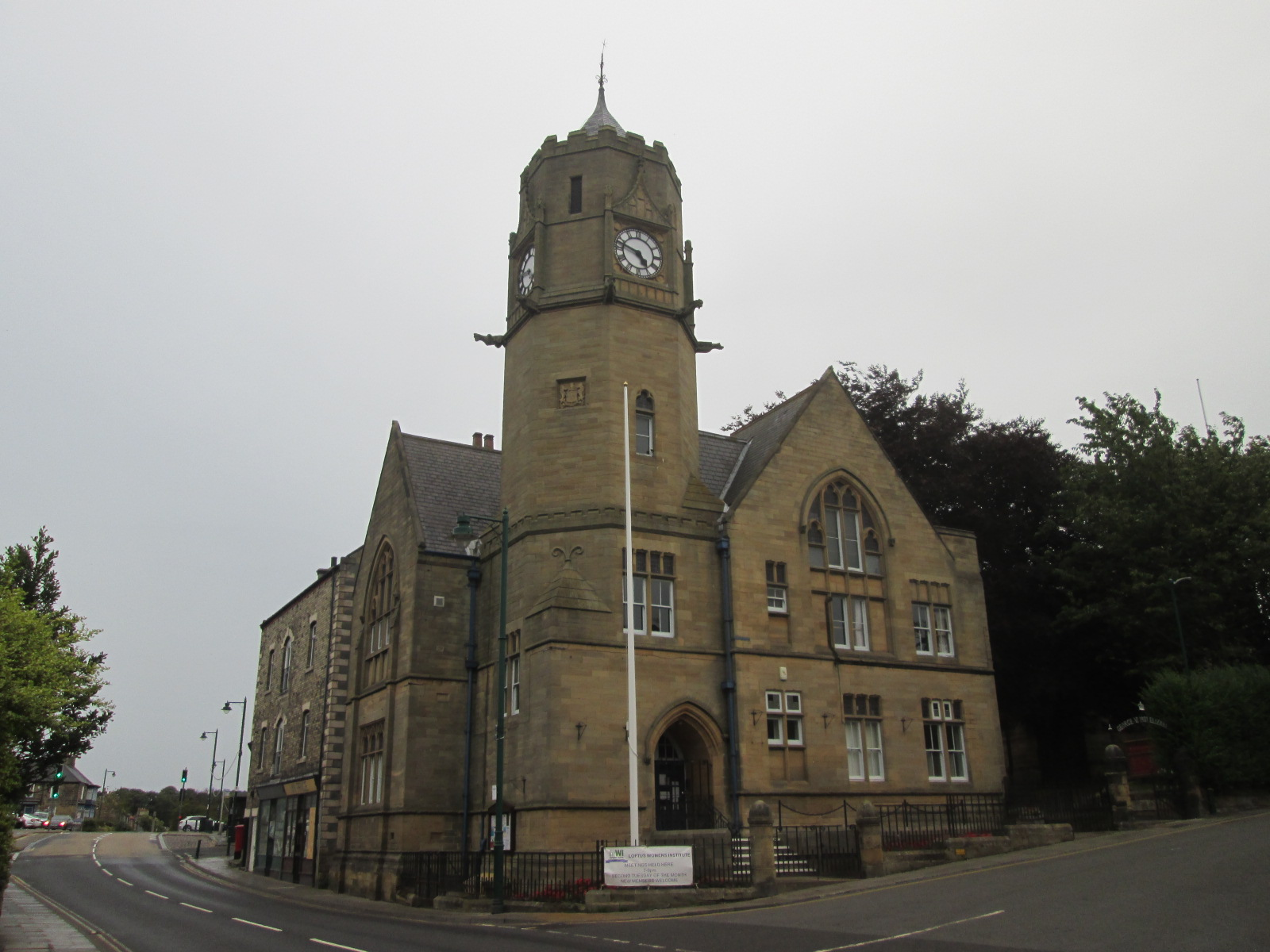
- Loftus Town Hall

- Shown in North Yorkshire
- 54.5535°N 0.8855°W
- Location: Water Lane, Loftus

History
- Built: 1879

Site notes
- Architect: Edward Robert Robson
- Architectural style: Gothic Revival style

Listed Building – Grade II
- Official name: Town Hall
- Designated: 27 February 1987
- Reference no.: 1136562

Loftus Town Hall is a municipal building in Water Lane in Loftus, North Yorkshire, England. The structure, which accommodates the offices and meeting place of Loftus Town Council, is a grade II listed building.

== History ==
Following significant industrial growth, largely associated with the iron mining industry, a local board was established in Loftus in 1876. In this context, Lawrence Dundas, 3rd Earl of Zetland, whose seat was at Aske Hall, decided to commission a town hall for the town. The new building was designed by Edward Robert Robson in the Gothic Revival style, built by Thomas Dickinson of Saltburn-by-the-Sea in ashlar stone at a cost of £4,500 and was completed in 1879.

The design involved an asymmetrical main frontage of two bays facing onto Water Lane. The left-hand bay featured a pointed doorway with a hood mould on the ground floor, and a cross-window with ogee-shaped heads on the first floor. Above the left-hand bay, there was a two-stage octagonal tower with a single window with tracery in the first stage, and clock faces in the second stage, all surmounted by a castellated parapet, a conical roof and a finial. Although clock faces were installed on the north, east and west elevations, there was no clock face to the south as residents in that direction refused to subscribe to the cost. The hour-striking Town Hall clock was manufactured by Potts & Sons of Leeds. The right-hand bay was fenestrated by three cross-windows with ogee-shaped heads on the ground floor and by a large mullioned and transomed window flanked by two smaller windows on the first floor, all surmounted by a gable. Internally, the principal room was the council chamber on the ground floor.

The area became an urban district, with the town hall as its meeting place, in 1894. Rooms in the building were requisitioned for military use during the First and Second World Wars. The urban district council acquired ownership of the town hall from the Zetland family for £2,000 in 1948, but it ceased to be the local seat of government when the enlarged Langbaurgh Borough Council was formed in 1974.

After local authority budget cuts threatened closure of the building, Loftus Town Council took over responsibility for the maintenance of the building in 1992 and secured money Heritage Lottery Fund for its refurbishment.
