= Liverton =

Village in North Yorkshire, England

Coordinates: 54.533°N 0.902°W

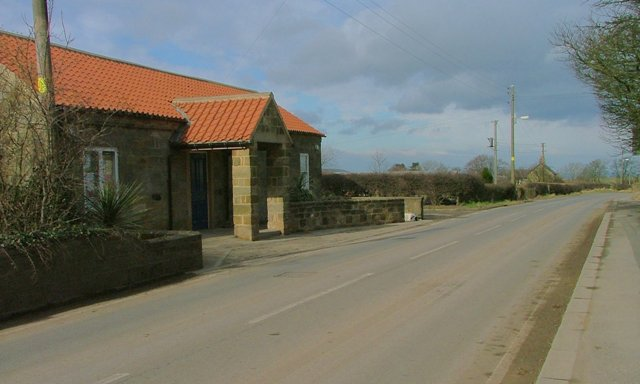
- The village hall in Liverton

- Location within North Yorkshire
- Population: 60
- Civil parish: Loftus
- Unitary authority: Redcar and Cleveland
- Ceremonial county: North Yorkshire
- Region: North East
- Country: England
- Sovereign state: United Kingdom
- Post town: Saltburn-by-the-Sea
- Postcode district: TS13
- Dialling code: 01287
- Police: Cleveland
- Fire: Cleveland
- Ambulance: North East
- UK Parliament: Middlesbrough South and East Cleveland

Liverton is a village in the civil parish of Loftus, in the borough of Redcar and Cleveland and the ceremonial county of North Yorkshire, England.

Liverton Village is named in Domesday Book and was previously named Liureton, it is a rural village that has by and large retained its heritage as a farming community and in 1978 became protected by a conservation order. In 2011 an Area Appraisal was performed.

The village is surrounded by a field system with Station Road B1366 running through the middle. The village can date its roots back to the 12th century, with evidence of this seen from the font, arch and doorway of St Michael's Church. There is further evidence of a medieval settlement in area.

It is located 140 meters above sea level and is located on the edge of the North Yorkshire Moors.

== Properties ==
The village primarily consists of farm land and cottages, with a moorland church, village hall and local inn. The village lies within the boundary of a conservation area and includes many listed buildings, most of which date back to the 18th century.

=== Listed buildings ===
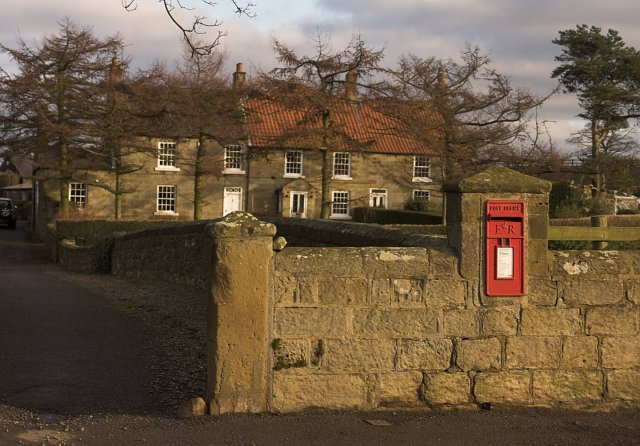
Tickhill House Farm and Cottages

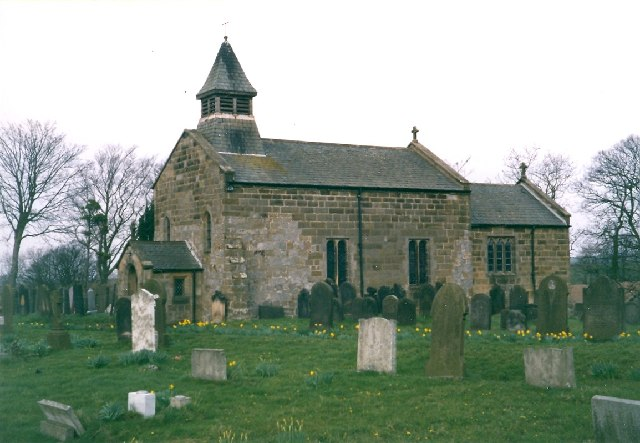
St Michael's Church

Within the village are many historic structures, most of which are constructed from local sandstone blocks with a herringbone finish. Below are some of the listed buildings:

- Parish Church of St Michael – dating back to the 12th century, List Entry Number 1139676 Evidence of the age of the church can be seen from the font, arch and doorway. Alterations over the years have kept the church in good state and retained the original structure. The church was restored at the beginning of the 20th century and the plaster was removed from the chancel arch. The arch can still be seen today.
- Church House Farm
- Tickhill House Farm, Middle House and Haygate Cottage (Formally Tickhill Cottage) – dating back to 1720, List Entry Number 1136629
- Shrubberies Cottage and Farm – dating back to 1800, list Entry Number 1139678

=== Village Hall ===
The village hall was previously owned by Lord Downe, as were many of the local farms and land. This building was converted from a school into a village hall and is now run by a village committee.

=== Local inn ===
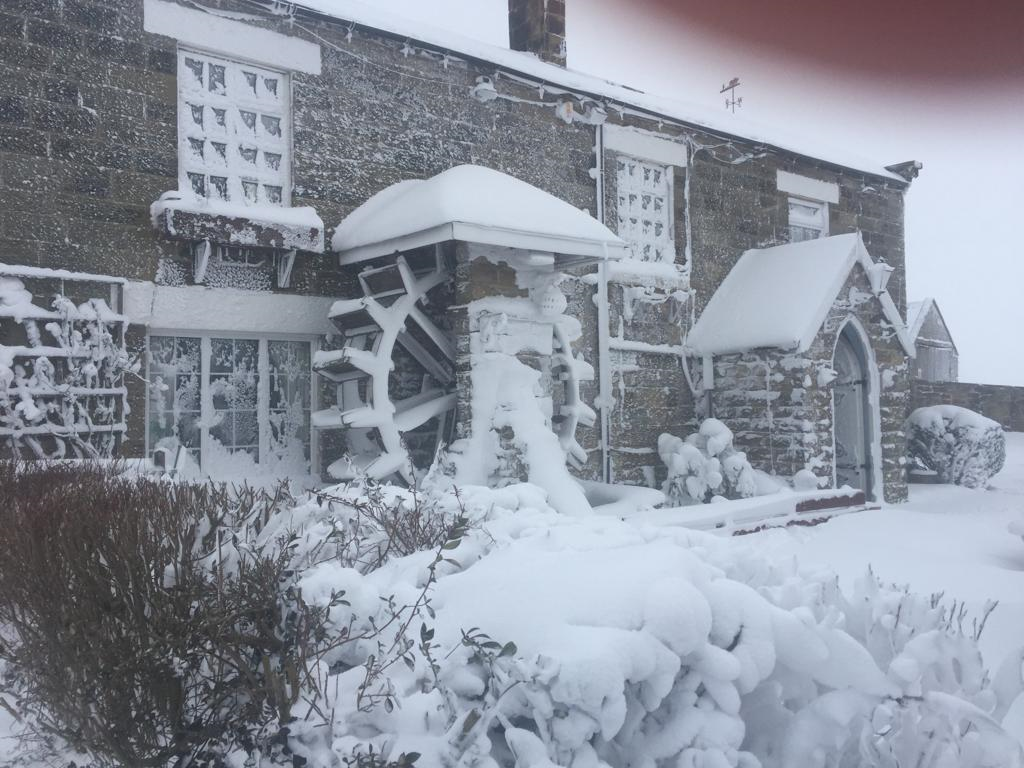
The Waterwheel Inn

There is a village inn called The Waterwheel Inn, located on the edge of the village. It reopened in 1962 and is a traditional building with beams on show and built from sandstone.

== Demographics ==
In 1870 the John Marius Wilson's Imperial Gazetteer of England and Wales stated the population of Liverton was 186. In 1951 the parish encompassing Liverton had grown with the population increasing to 1109.

== History ==
Liverton Village was named in the Domesday Book and previously went by the name of Liureton.

In 1870–72, John Marius Wilson's Imperial Gazetteer of England and Wales described Liverton like this:

LIVERTON, a township-chapelry in Easington parish, N. R Yorkshire; 6¼ miles E of Guisbrough town and r. station. Post town, Redcar. Acres, 2,400. Real property, £1,216. Pop., 186. Houses, 38. The manor belongs to Viscount Downe. The living is a p. curacy, annexed to the rectory of Easington, in the diocese of York. The church is partly Norman.

— John Marius Wilson, Imperial Gazetteer of England and Wales
