= Filey Town Council Offices =

Municipal building in Filey, North Yorkshire, England

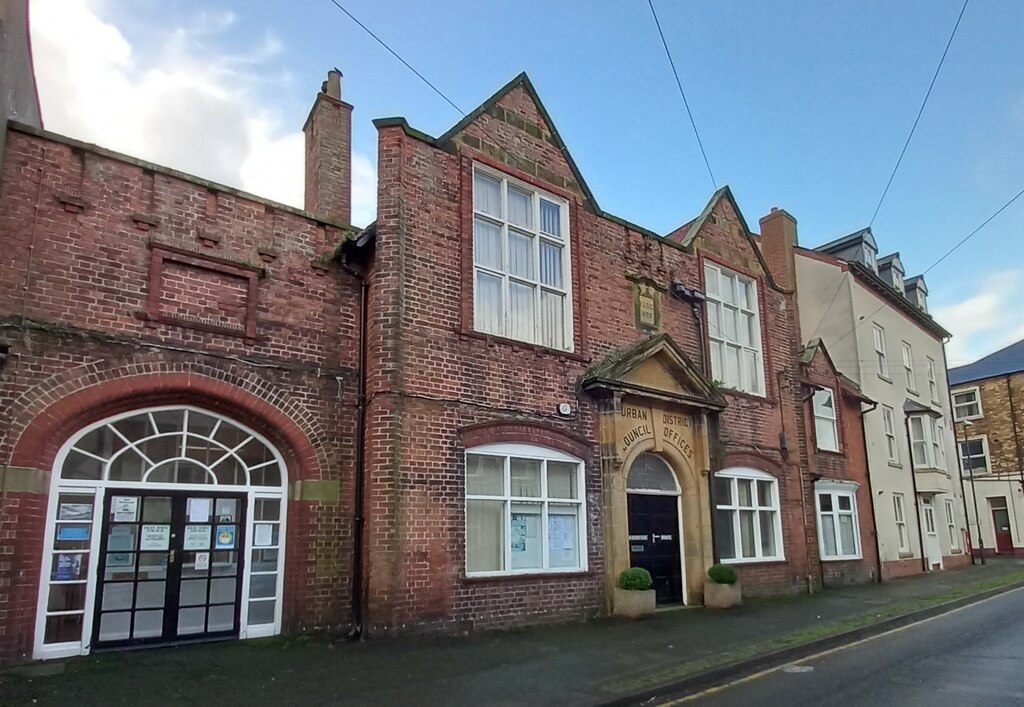
- The building in December 2021

- Shown in North Yorkshire
- 54.2110°N 0.2866°W
- Location: Queen Street, Filey

History
- Built: 1898

Site notes
- Architectural style: Neoclassical style

Filey Town Council Offices is a municipal building in Queen Street, Filey, North Yorkshire, England. The building is currently used to accommodate the offices and meeting place of Filey Town Council.

== History ==
Following significant population growth, largely associated with the fishing industry, a local board of health was established in Filey in 1868. After the local board was succeeded by Filey Urban District Council in 1894, the new council decided to commission council offices. The site they selected was on the south side of Queen Street.

Construction of the new building started in 1897. It was designed in the neoclassical style, built in red brick with ashlar stone dressings and was completed in 1898. It comprised a central block, with the council offices; a caretakers' house to the right; and a fire station to the left. The fire service relocated to Mitford Street in 1935. During the Second World War, the building was used by the Ministry of Food, and an air raid siren was fitted to the tower. After the war, the council established additional offices in different locations in the town.

The building continued to serve as the offices of Filey Urban District Council for much of the 20th century, but ceased to be the local seat of government when the council moved to the Evron Centre in John Street in 1971. Following local government reorganisation in 1974, the new town council initially established itself at the Evron Centre, but moved to the council offices in Queen Street in 1993. The round headed opening in the former fire station, designed for the use of fire engines, was converted into a public entrance.

A collection of material documenting the heritage of Filey, which had been brought together by Fred Fisher and John Crimlisk to form the "Crimlisk Fisher Archive" in 1991, was deposited in the council offices. The collection included approximately 90 recordings in DVD format concerning the history of Filey, many of them interviews with residents.

== Architecture ==
The building is constructed of brick, with a tile roof and a stone doorcase. The design of the central block involves a symmetrical main frontage of three bays facing onto Queen Street. The central bay features a round headed doorway flanked by pilasters supporting a triangular pediment; there is a date stone on the first floor. The outer bays are fenestrated with segmental headed casement windows on the ground floor, and with square headed casement windows on the first floor and are surmounted by gables. It has a bell tower which the architectural historian, Nikolaus Pevsner, describes as "pretty", although he describes the building overall as "unremarkable".
