= Liverton Mines =

Village in North Yorkshire, England

Coordinates: 54.547°N 00.90°W

- Location within North Yorkshire
- Population: 1,500
- OS grid reference: NZ7117
- Civil parish: Loftus
- Unitary authority: Redcar and Cleveland
- Ceremonial county: North Yorkshire
- Region: North East
- Country: England
- Sovereign state: United Kingdom
- Police: Cleveland
- Fire: Cleveland
- Ambulance: North East

Liverton Mines is a village in the unitary authority of Redcar and Cleveland and the ceremonial county of North Yorkshire, England. It is surrounded by large, local towns Middlesbrough, Redcar, Guisborough and Whitby. The village has a shop (Charlie's), a post office, a fish and chip shop, church and a pub.

== History ==
The Cleveland Hills were once an important ironstone mining area, providing the iron ore for the steel industry in Middlesbrough. Liverton Mines had an ironstone pit outside the village, located in the Cleveland Ironstone belt. The pit was opened in 1871 and closed in 1923.

== Sport and recreation ==
Located within the heart of the village is a cricket field; it was once the home of Liverton Mines Cricket Club, but is no longer used for any type of recognised team sport. It is still used for the occasional gathering of local people for leisure. There is a large wooded area and valley to the west of the village leading to Carlin How.

== Housing ==
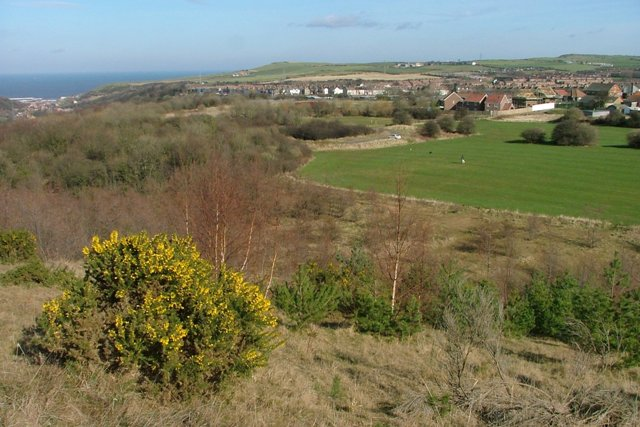
Looking east towards Liverton Mines

Much of the housing is simple terraced Victorian, although a large estate was erected following the Second World War. There are currently two new housing projects under construction, one at the site of the former Working Men's Club and the other on the site of the Whitby Farmers store.

== Statistics ==
Statistics about Redcar & Cleveland from the Office for National Statistics Census 2001 https://web.archive.org/web/20110902105910/http://www.redcar-cleveland.gov.uk/ - Borough Council website BBC Tees
