= Handale Priory =

Cistercian nunnery in North Yorkshire, England

Coordinates: 54.531056°N 0.8808643°W

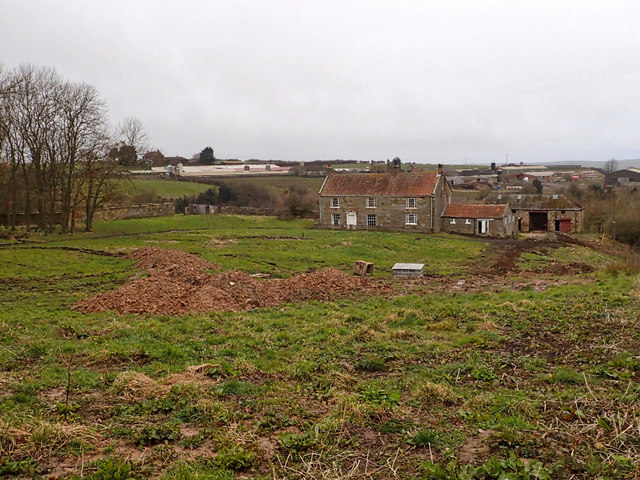
Site of the former nunnery

Handale Priory (also called Grendale) was a priory of Cistercian nuns in Handale, North Yorkshire, England. It was founded in 1133 by William, son of Roger de Percy, and was dissolved in 1539. A fishpond survives and a farmhouse built on the site in the 18th century may incorporate part of the priory.
