= Listed buildings in Filey =

Filey is a civil parish in the county of North Yorkshire, England. It contains 26 listed buildings that are recorded in the National Heritage List for England. Of these, one is listed at Grade I, the highest of the three grades, one is at Grade II*, the middle grade, and the others are at Grade II, the lowest grade. The parish contains the seaside town of Filey, and most of the listed buildings are houses and associated structures, including terraces with three or four storeys, basements and attics. The others include churches, a farmhouse and farm buildings, a public house, and a war memorial archway.

== Key ==
Grade	Criteria
I	Buildings of exceptional interest, sometimes considered to be internationally important
II*	Particularly important buildings of more than special interest
II	Buildings of national importance and special interest

== Buildings ==
Name and location	Photograph	Date	Notes	Grade
St Oswald's Church; 54.21318°N 0.28752°W		12th century	The church has been altered and extended through the centuries, in particular between 1885 and 1886 by William S. Barber. It is built in sandstone with roofs of slate and lead, and consists of a nave with a clerestory, north and south aisles, north and south porches, north and south transepts, a chancel, and a tower at the crossing. The tower has two stages, clock faces, two-light pointed bell openings under round arches, a sill band, and an embattled parapet. The body of the church is also embattled, and the windows are lancets. The south doorway has a round arch with four orders, and a later stoup.	I
43 and 45 Church Street; 54.21259°N 0.28908°W		Late 17th century	A house, later divided, in whitewashed stone, with a pantile roof. There are two storeys and three bays. On the front are two doorways with plain surrounds, and the windows are sashes with wedge lintels and raised keystones.	II
Dovecote, Church Cliff Farm; 54.21393°N 0.28771°W	—	Late 17th to early 18th century	The dovecote is in limestone on a chamfered plinth, with quoins, a chamfered band, and a hipped slate roof with a timber glover. There is a square plan and two stages. The doorway has chamfered quoined jambs and a chamfered lintel, and there is an opening with a landing platform high in the south wall. Inside, there are nesting boxes and platforms on all walls.	II
8 and 10 Queen Street; 54.21174°N 0.28888°W		1696	A house, later a museum, in whitewashed stone with a pantile roof. There are two storeys and three bays. Above the original doorway is a crudely carved datestone with a coat of arms and a religious inscription. To the left of the doorway is a fire window with a blocked round head and a hood mould, and further to the left is a later doorway with a rectangular divided fanlight. The windows are horizontally-sliding sashes.	II
13 Church Street; 54.21171°N 0.28981°W	—	c. 1790	The house is in sandstone, and has a pantile roof with a coped gable and a shaped kneeler on the left. There are two storeys and two bays. The doorway is in the centre, the windows are sashes, and all the openings have wedge lintels with raised keystones.	II
35 Church Street; 54.21235°N 0.28923°W	—	Early 18th century	The house is in red brick on a stone plinth, with limestone on the sides and rear, stone dressings, quoins, and a pantile roof. There are two storeys and an attic, and three bays. The main doorway and the passage doorway to the left have fanlights, the windows are sashes, and all the openings in the ground and upper floors have wedge lintels and grooved keystones; the ground floor windows also have decorative ironwork. Above the doorway is a blocked window containing a re-set initialled datestone.	II
82 Queen Street; 54.21083°N 0.28534°W	—	18th century	A pair of fishermen's cottages later combined into a house. It is rendered with a dentilled eaves course and a pantile roof. There are two storeys, two bays and a continuous rear outshut. In each bay is a doorway on the right and a sash window in each floor on the left, and at the rear are flat-roofed dormers.	II
41 Church Street; 54.21251°N 0.28916°W		Late 18th century	The house is in red brick on a stone plinth, with sandstone at the rear, and a tile roof. There are three storeys at the front, two at the rear with a catslide roof, and two bays. The doorway on the left has pilasters, panelled reveals, a fanlight and a cornice, and to the right is a square bay window. The windows in the upper floors are sashes, those in the middle floor with grooved wedge lintels, and decorative keystones.	II
The Foords Hotel; 54.21089°N 0.28570°W		c. 1815	The public house is in whitewashed brick on a stone plinth, with stone dressings, a modillion eaves cornice and a slate roof. There are three storeys, three bays and a rear wing. The central doorway has attached Doric fluted columns, an entablature and a cornice, above which is a two-storey canted bay window. In the ground floor are tripartite windows, and above are sash windows, those in the middle floor with wedge lintels and keystones.	II
Church Cliff Farmhouse; 54.21370°N 0.28809°W	—	Early 19th century	Two houses at right angles in light red brick with painted stone dressings, slate roofs, and two storeys. The south range has five bays, paired eaves modillions, a central porch with fluted pilasters, and a doorway with a radial fanlight. The east range has six bays, and a round-arched doorway with a flat hood on consoles, above which is a round-headed staircase window. The other windows in both ranges are sashes with wedge lintels.	II
Farm buildings, Church Cliff Farm; 54.21400°N 0.28839°W	—	Early 19th century	The farm buildings are in red brick with pantile roofs, and form a U-shaped plan, with three ranges around a yard. They have two storeys, or one storey with a loft, and include cart and implement sheds, barns, cowsheds and a smithy. The openings have brick quoined surrounds.	II
8–14 The Crescent; 54.20729°N 0.28673°W		1840	A terrace of seven houses, later converted into flats, in stuccoed brick, with a rusticated ground floor, a sill band, a moulded eaves cornice, and a slate roof. There are three storeys, a basement and an attic. Each house has three bays, the three bays at the ends projecting. On the front, and on the returns, are Doric porches with fluted columns approached by steps, the middle two porches paired. The doorways have fanlights, the windows are sashes, and in the attic are dormers. Along the middle floor is a continuous wrought iron balcony on iron brackets.	II
27–41 West Avenue and railings 54.20834°N 0.28913°W		c. 1840	A terrace of eight town houses in red brick with Welsh slate roofs. There are three storeys, a half-basement and attics, and each house has two bays and a double depth plan. The doorways are approached by steps flanked by railings, and each has Doric columns, a rectangular fanlight, an entablature and a cornice. The windows are sashes with gauged brick flat arches, there are four canted bay windows, and two roof dormers. The roof of No. 41 has been replaced by a mansard roof.	II
Langford Villa; 54.20447°N 0.28740°W	—	c. 1840	The house, later divided, is stuccoed, and has a hipped slate roof. There are two storeys, three bays, and a later extension on the left at the rear. The central doorway has pilasters, a rectangular fanlight and a cornice, and the windows are sashes with stone sills.	II
Filey railway station 54.20986°N 0.29395°W		1846	The station was built for the York and North Midland Railway and designed by G. T. Andrews. It is in red brick on a stone plinth, with dressings in brick and sandstone, and a slate roof. The entrance range has a single storey and seven bays, the middle bay projecting with chamfered quoins. The doorway has a quoined surround, a radial fanlight, and a gauged brick arch with a keystone. The windows are sashes, most with round heads, gauged brick arches and keystones. There are moulded sill and impost bands, a moulded overhanging eaves course, and a parapet. The canopy is in timber and glass on iron brackets, the train shed roof is in slate, and the platforms are connected by a footbridge.	II*
24–38 Rutland Street; 54.20759°N 0.28777°W		1847	A terrace of eight houses, later converted into flats, in stuccoed brick, some colourwashed, with a rusticated ground floor, quoins on the left, giant pilasters, a string course and a sill band, a moulded eaves course, and a slate roof. There are three storeys, a basement and an attic. Each house has two bays and a full height bow window. The recessed doorways are approached by steps, and have fanlights, the windows are sashes, and in the attic are dormers. The windows at the rear have gauged brick wedge lintels.	II
1–7 The Crescent and railings 54.20787°N 0.28657°W		1850–51	A terrace of houses, later flats, in stuccoed brick, with a rusticated ground floor, string courses and a slate roof. There are three storeys, a basement and attics, and each house has two bays. The doorways are approached by steps flanked by iron railings. The windows are sashes, tripartite in the ground floor, with bracketed cornices in the middle floor, and eared architraves in the top floor The end bays have giant Corinthian pilasters, and the middle floor windows have bracketed pediments. One house has a three-storey bow window, and in the attics are 20th-century dormers.	II
15–21 The Crescent; 54.20672°N 0.28682°W		Mid 19th century	A terrace of seven houses, later converted into flats, in stuccoed brick, with a rusticated ground floor, moulded bands, a bracketed cornice on the end bays, and a slate roof. There are four storeys, a basement and an attic, and twelve bays. On the front are five round-arched doorways, two converted into windows. The windows are sashes, those in the first floor with eared and shouldered architraves, segmental heads and keystones, and those in the end bays with a segmental pediment. In the attic are dormers, and on the right return are two four-storey bow windows.	II
Royal Crescent Court, railings and lamp standards 54.20620°N 0.28677°W		1853	A hotel, later flats, in stuccoed brick, with a sill band, a modillion cornice, a moulded eaves cornice, and a hipped slate roof. There are four storeys, a basement and attics, and five bays, the middle and outer bays projecting. In the centre is a portico with paired Doric columns and a balustrade, above which is a Venetian window with a keystone, and a tripartite window. Flanking the portico are continuous wrought iron balconies. The windows in the first floor have cornices with detached consoles. In the returns are four-storey bow windows. In front of the building, and on the sides, are cast iron railings on a low stone plinth, and there are four cast iron lamp pedestals.	II
23–28 The Crescent; 54.20572°N 0.28684°W		c. 1855	A terrace of flats and a hotel in stuccoed brick, with a rusticated ground floor, giant pilasters, a moulded string course, a sill band, a moulded eaves cornice, and a slate roof. There are three storeys, a basement and attics. Each house has two bays, and a doorway with a keystone. The windows are sash windows, tripartite on the ground floor, those in the middle floor with a cornice on scrolled consoles and in the top floor with architraves and moulded sills. The end bays project and have continuous wrought iron balconies. The left return has three bays, with a three-storey bow window on the left and a single-storey bow window on the right. Between them is a doorway with a cornice on scrolled consoles, and at the top is a pedimented gable containing a round-headed window.	II
Northcliffe Cottage; 54.21011°N 0.28612°W	—	1891–93	A gardener's cottage, later a private house, designed by Walter Brierley in Jacobethan style, it is in sandstone, with a moulded floor band, overhanging bracketed eaves, and a tile roof with coped gables and plain kneelers. There is one storey and an attic, and a front of three bays. In the centre is a gabled porch containing a basket arched doorway. The windows are mullioned, the window on the left corner corbelled out. In the attic is a gabled half-dormer with a hood mould.	II
Northcliffe House; 54.20974°N 0.28604°W		1891–93	A large house designed by Walter Brierley in Jacobethan style, it is in sandstone, with a moulded floor band, and a tile roof with coped gables and ball finials. There are two storeys and attics, and a front of five bays. The porch has a basket arch, over which is a dated cartouche and an embattled parapet. The right bay is gabled and contains a canted bay window with an embattled parapet. The windows are mullioned, those in the ground floor also with transoms, and there are 20th-century dormers. At the rear is a three-storey embattled tower, and a three-storey canted bay window. The former service range includes a kitchen with a conical roof.	II
Gates and gate piers, Northcliffe House; 54.20905°N 0.28677°W		1893	At the entrance to the grounds of the house are three gate piers, designed by Walter Brierley, flanking a carriage entrance and a pedestrian entrance to the left. The piers are in sandstone with a square plan and are about 3.5 metres (11 ft) high. Each pier has a recessed shaped panel with a blank cartouche on each side, and a heavy cornice stepped up to a ball and pedestal finial. Over the pedestrian entrance is a round arch with the name of the house painted on the tympanum.	II
St Mary's Church; 54.20692°N 0.28765°W		1906	The church is built in red Ruabon brick, with white rendered panels, and a buff tiled roof. It consists of a nave, a west chapel, a chancel, a long south transept, and a north porch and campanile. The campanile is in Italianate style, and has panels with symbols, an open bell stage, and a pyramidal roof with a pineapple finial. The nave windows are round-arched with imposts and keystones, and the tracery is in cast concrete. On the front are buttresses with panels containing symbols. The east end has brick diapering and rendering, and contains a mosaic roundel.	II
War Memorial Archway; 54.20941°N 0.28789°W		1921	The archway at the entrance to the memorial garden is in Portland stone, and contains wrought iron gates. The arch is round, with a keystone, and is flanked by piers. On the front of the piers are bronze plaques with the name of those lost in the two World Wars, and above them are wreathed shields containing dates. Inside the piers are plaques with the names of those lost in later conflicts. Above the arch is a parapet with an inscription.	II
The Lodge and The Coach house 54.21014°N 0.28572°W	—	Undated	The coach house and stables, later two dwellings, were designed by Walter Brierley in Jacobethan style. They are in sandstone with a moulded floor band, overhanging bracketed eaves, and a tile roof with coped gables and plain kneelers. There is one storey and lofts, with two ranges at right angles. The middle bay of the main range projects and is gabled, and contains a doorway. The windows in the ground floor are mullioned and transomed, and there is a half-dormer above. In front is a glass canopy on iron struts, and in the gable is a pigeon loft. In the centre of the main range is a bell cupola.	II
