= Church of St Oswald, Filey =

Anglican church in North Yorkshire, England

- St Oswald's Church
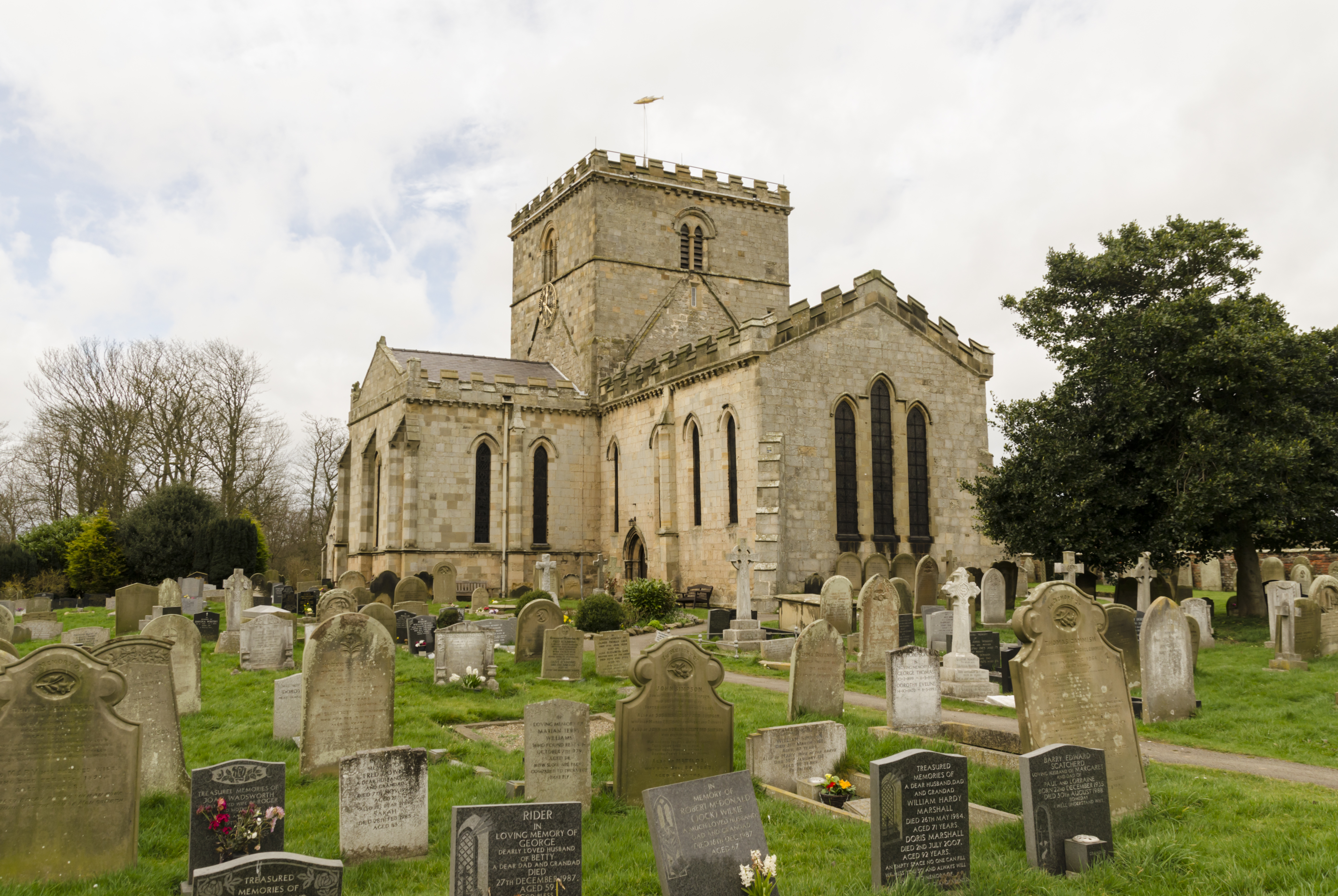
- The Church of St Oswald, Filey
- Church of St Oswald, Filey
- 54.213°N 0.287°W
- OS grid reference: TA 117 810
- Location: Filey, North Yorkshire
- Country: England
- Denomination: Church of England
- Website: Official website

History
- Status: Parish church
- Dedication: St Oswald

Architecture
- Functional status: Active
- Style: Norman; Early English

Specifications
- Length: 140 feet (42.8 m)

Administration
- Diocese: York
- Archdeaconry: East Riding
- Deanery: Scarborough
- Benefice: Filey
- Parish: Filey

Clergy
- Vicar: Nigel Leonard Chapman

Listed Building – Grade I
- Designated: 24 October 1950
- Reference no.: 1316455

The Church of St Oswald, Filey, is a parish church in the North Yorkshire town of Filey, England. The church dates from the 12th and 13th centuries, with some embattlements added in the 15th century. The building is now grade I listed and was described by Pevsner as "easily the finest church in the north-east corner of the East Riding".

St Oswald's church building sits at the northern edge of a ravine that divides the town of Filey in two; the church being located in the North Riding of Yorkshire, whereas historically, the rest of the town was in the East Riding of Yorkshire. The Norman tower has been a wayfaring point for mariners who were sailing between the Tyne and London, and the tower also provided a good point to aim at for those who were landing on the sands at Filey.

The position and design of the church, coupled with its size (over 130 feet (40 m)), have led some historians to suggest that the church had a higher importance than a mere parish church and may be older than contemporary thought had given it. Its size, given the sparse population it served, has led to it being called "a cathedral in miniature".

The church is also listed in Simon Jenkins' England's Thousand Best Churches.

== History ==
The basic design of St Oswald's is a cruciform church, which has been dated as far back as 1150, though some modern historians attest that integral features of the church point to an earlier period. However, the architectural design of Norman transitioning to Early English, has led many to date the church somewhere between 1180 and 1230. Sleight argues that the salient angles and structure of the tower predate the Early English nave, chancel and transepts below it, which was common in the eleventh century churches. The position of the church on a clifftop and its overall length (140 feet (42.8 m)), (Note: The usual length of churches in the area was between 82 feet (25 m) and 115 feet (35 m). Whilst there are two exceptions; Hunmanby and Seamer, these have both been added to down the centuries.) have led some to suggest that the church was a minster in the former Manor of Falsgrave, and has also led to it being labelled as "a cathedral in miniature".

Before the Conquest, the Manor of Falsgrave was owned by Tostig, who, along with his wife Judith, were adherents of the cult of Oswald, and so the church is dedicated to the Northumbrian king, Oswald. After The Conquest, the land was gifted to the de Gant family who gave the church at Filey to the monks of Bridlington Priory. The monks later rebuilt the church. The importance of Filey may go even further back in history; its location has been noted as one of the possible sites of the Roman Praetorium as described by Ptolemy, though several other sites are known to have been suggested. Roman coins have been discovered at Filey Brigg.

No vicarage was installed at Filey, rather the monks at Bridlington served it with one of the canons, and this arrangement was confirmed by Archbishop Greenfield in 1310, and was carried on until the dissolution. A record from 1353 states that the "Chapel of Filey is exempt from archidiaconal visitations, (Note: Now known as Archdeacons' Visitations, these allowed an archdeacon to "observe the spiritual and moral welfare of his[sic] flock, both ecclesiastical and lay, and the work of his court".) but dependent on the church of Whitby.

The basic structure of the church has remained largely unaltered since the thirteenth century, though the pitch of the roofs have been lowered, (which can be evidenced from the photograph above). The overall style is Norman transitioning into Early English with parts being Perpendicular in nature, thus the clerestory windows are circular headed, but the arches beneath are more pointed. The nave consists of six bays and the chancel is lower than the rest of the church, having a descent of two steps down into it. The church underwent a substantial renovation in 1839, which cost over £1,500. A carved figure in the south wall of the nave is said to represent a boy bishop who died in office, though it could also celebrate a member of the laity. There are three sedilia in the Early English style in the transept, with three more in the chancel. There was a sundial outside the priest's door that was inscribed with the motto of Nyx Epetai (Greek: The night cometh). It is believed to have been rare, if not unique, use of Greek rather than Latin in the area for a sundial affixed to a church. The sundial was noted as having been stolen, sometime in the early 2000s.

In the 19th century, Filey developed as a tourist resort and coupled with the arrival of the railway, the New Town area developed Filey into a larger settlement. Between 1870 and 1871, St John's Church was built in the town to cope with the increased population, and was designated a chapel of ease to St Oswald's. The ecclesiastical parish and benefice of Filey now includes both St John's and St Oswald's, with St Thomas' church in nearby Gristhorpe. The church was first renovated in the 19th century for £1,500 in 1840. It was refurbished again between May 1885 and August 1866 at a cost of £3,600. The architect was William Swinden Barber, and the works involved lowering the floors to their original level and repairing the decaying walls. The restored church was opened by the Archbishop of York in August 1886.

The roof was partially rebuilt in 1908 after it was destroyed in a fire.

Pevsner described St Oswald's as "easily the finest church in the north-east corner of the East Riding". The church is now a grade I listed structure. Simon Jenkins lists the church in his book England's Thousand Best Churches, giving it two stars out of a possible five. Jenkins describes the church as having a massive crossing tower and of Filey as being Scarborough's sedate Edwardian sister; "though there is nothing sedate about its architecture".

Originally, Filey was a small fishing village, but the church was across a small ravine (known as Church Ravine) in the North Riding of Yorkshire, with the village in the East Riding of Yorkshire. As the ravine was the boundary between the two counties, this gave rise to a local saying: "He'll soon be in the North Riding", if someone was ill and not expected to get better. In 1857, a massive storm with torrential rainfall hit the area between Filey and Whitby, and washed the stone bridge across the ravine away. A replacement cast-iron bridge was built in 1871, but this too was replaced in 1994 when it became unsafe. In the 1974 county boundary amendments, all of Filey was moved into North Yorkshire.

=== The tower ===
The tower of the church, (roughly 30 feet (9 m) by 30 feet (9 m)) is described as being central in the building, when it is actually slightly-off centre to the east. This has been put down to subsidence in the west end of the church which would not support the extra weight. Other historians state that the tower was originally at the west end, but the irregularly placed pillars underneath and the sloping ground to the west meant it was unsafe and moved further eastwards. Further suggestions have put forward the theory that the church had two towers at one point, with only the central crossing tower remaining due to the subsidence of the west tower. The position of the church and its prominent tower has been a waymarking point for centuries during the marine supply route between the shipping yards on the Tyne, Wear and Esk and London. It was also used as an aiming point for craft wishing to beach on the sands below it at Filey.

A routine inspection of the tower in 2014 revealed instances of graffiti in the lead roof of the tower. A more detailed survey uncovered nearly 1,500 examples of graffiti from simple items such as hand and hearts to a full image of a Whitby Cat. These images are believed to date from the 18th and 19th centuries and have been the subject of detailed examination by Historic England. One of the steps on the staircase is an eighth-century grave cover.

== Clergy ==
The Reverend Thomas Norfolk Jackson was the incumbent at St Oswald's between 1833 and 1873. On one of her stays of the Yorkshire Coast in the 1850s, Charlotte Brontë described Reverend Jackson as a "well-meaning, but [an] utterly inactive clergyman...and the Methodists flourish".

Between 1880 and 1935, the vicar of the parish was the Reverend A N Cooper, who famously walked over 200 miles (320 km) to London. Buoyed by this success, he later took six weeks off and walked to Rome.

== Churchyard ==
Charles Dickens wrote at length about his time observing the epitaphs in the churchyard. Dickens was especially moved by the harsh lives of the fishermen and their wives.

The churchyard contains over a thousand graves, (25 of which are Commonwealth War Graves), and was closed to burials in 2014, though interment of ashes is still possible. Members of the crew of the fishing boat "Joan Margaret" are buried in the churchyard. The boat sank in the Humber Estuary after hitting mines.

In 2019, a Consistory Court held at York Minster decided that a body had been buried illegally in the churchyard in October 2018. The deceased had a long-standing wish to be interred in the churchyard where many of his relatives were laid to rest. However, the churchyard was closed to burials in 2014, and even though the incumbent vicar had explained this to the family and funeral directors, whilst he was away, the body was buried without the proper authority. Even though the Consistory Court ruled that there had been an illegal burial, they allowed for the body to remain in place as it was the dying man's wish.

== See also ==
- Grade I listed buildings in North Yorkshire (district)
- Listed buildings in Filey
