= Handale =

Hamlet in North Yorkshire, England

Coordinates: 54.531°N 0.880°W

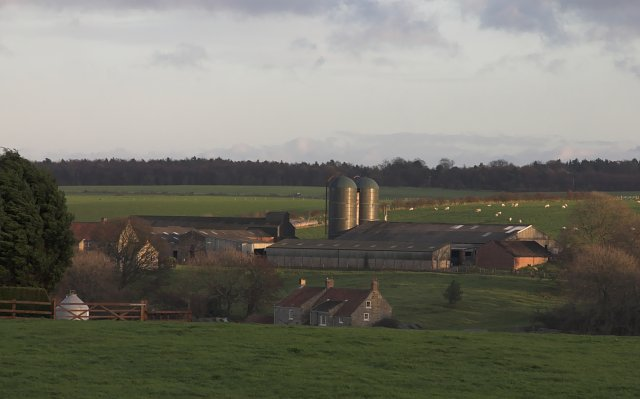
Handale

Handale is a hamlet, that is 2 miles (3 km) south of Loftus, in the borough of Redcar and Cleveland and the ceremonial county of North Yorkshire, England.

Handale was once the site of a Cistercian nunnery, founded in 1133.

There is a legend that the woods in the area were once the haunt of a dragon known as the Handale Serpent. It is said that the dragon was slain by a man named Scaw, after whom Scaw Wood is named.

== See also ==
- Handale Priory
