= Loftus, North Yorkshire =

Town and civil parish in North Yorkshire, England

Coordinates: 54.5569°N 0.8919°W

Loftus
- Town
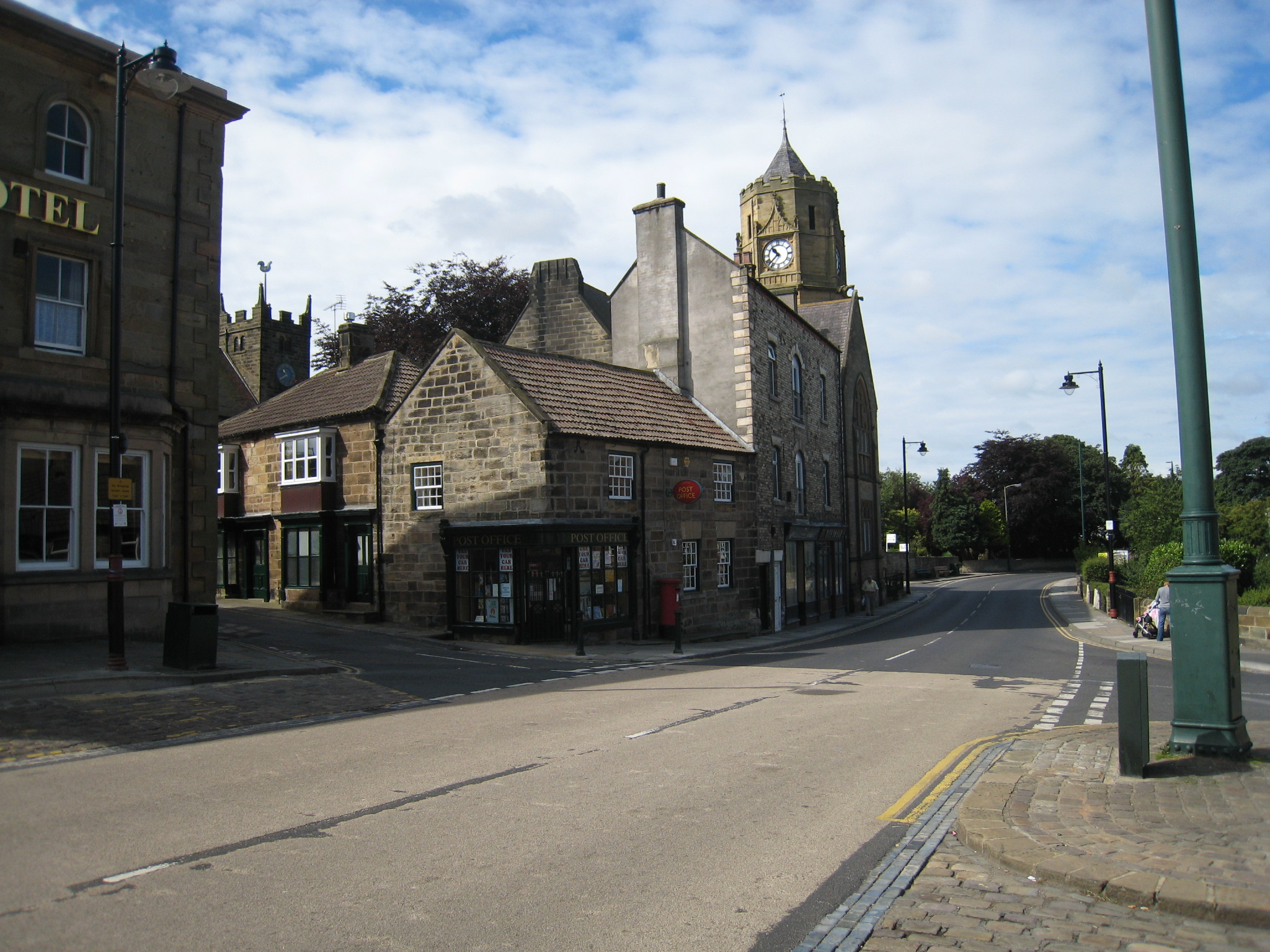
- Loftus Town Hall (on the right) and Parish Church (on the left)

- Location within North Yorkshire
- Population: 7,988 (2011 census)
- OS grid reference: NZ716185
  - London: 210 mi (340 km) S
- Unitary authority: Redcar and Cleveland
- Ceremonial county: North Yorkshire
- Region: North East
- Country: England
- Sovereign state: United Kingdom
- Post town: SALTBURN-BY-THE-SEA
- Postcode district: TS13
- Dialling code: 01287
- Police: Cleveland
- Fire: Cleveland
- Ambulance: North East
- UK Parliament: Middlesbrough South and East Cleveland
- Website: Town council website

Loftus is a market town and civil parish in the Redcar and Cleveland borough of North Yorkshire, England. The town is located north of the North York Moors and sits between Whitby and Skelton-in-Cleveland. The parish includes the villages of Carlin How, Easington, Liverton, Liverton Mines and Skinningrove. It is near Brotton and Saltburn.

The town was formerly known as Lofthouse.

== Demographics ==
The town's built-up area, including Liverton Mines, had a population of 4,824 in the 2011 census, with the entire town's parish population being 7,988.

== History ==
The Loftus area has been inhabited since at least the 7th century. A manor in the area was owned by Siward, Earl of Northumbria, who died in 1055. Loftus is recorded as "Lcotvsv" in the Domesday Book, from Laghthus meaning low houses.

=== Anglo-Saxon royal burial site ===
The only known Anglo-Saxon royal burial site in north-east England is near Loftus.

Artefacts were discovered there from excavations which took place between 2005 and 2007. Finds include pieces associated with a rare bed burial in which a decorated female body is laid out on a decorated wooden bed accompanied by fine gold jewellery. The finds include a gold pendant, which would have belonged to a princess. as well as glass beads, pottery, iron knives, belt buckles and other objects. The finds, which date back nearly 1400 years were discovered by members of the Teesside Archeological Society, led by Dr Steve Sherlock, in a 109-grave site at Street House, Loftus. They are presently on show at the Kirkleatham Old Hall Museum.

=== Oddfellows Hall ===
The Oddfellows Hall, in Loftus, was built in 1874, as the offices and meeting place of the local Oddfellows society. Oddfellows were friendly or mutual societies, set up and organised by people from different guilds representing various trades. Other societies existed for single trades, but when there were not enough people from one trade, especially in smaller towns, societies would be formed from an "odd" mixture of people, so giving the name "Oddfellows". The Loftus Oddfellows would raise money for their members. The Oddfellows Hall was unused from the early 1990s. Tees Valley Housing Association has now taken over ownership of the building and converted it from a large meeting hall into eight self-contained flats.

== Climate ==
Loftus has an oceanic climate (Köppen: Cfb).

Climate data for Loftus (158 m or 518 ft asl, averages 1991–2020)
Month	Jan	Feb	Mar	Apr	May	Jun	Jul	Aug	Sep	Oct	Nov	Dec	Year
Mean daily maximum °C (°F)	6.2 (43.2)	6.8 (44.2)	8.8 (47.8)	11.2 (52.2)	13.7 (56.7)	16.7 (62.1)	19.3 (66.7)	19.4 (66.9)	16.6 (61.9)	12.8 (55.0)	9.1 (48.4)	6.7 (44.1)	12.3 (54.1)
Daily mean °C (°F)	4.0 (39.2)	4.3 (39.7)	5.7 (42.3)	7.8 (46.0)	10.2 (50.4)	13.0 (55.4)	15.3 (59.5)	15.5 (59.9)	13.3 (55.9)	10.1 (50.2)	6.7 (44.1)	4.4 (39.9)	9.2 (48.6)
Mean daily minimum °C (°F)	1.7 (35.1)	1.7 (35.1)	2.6 (36.7)	4.3 (39.7)	6.7 (44.1)	9.3 (48.7)	11.4 (52.5)	11.6 (52.9)	9.9 (49.8)	7.4 (45.3)	4.2 (39.6)	2.0 (35.6)	6.1 (43.0)
Average precipitation mm (inches)	48.9 (1.93)	38.7 (1.52)	37.3 (1.47)	43.7 (1.72)	40.2 (1.58)	65.1 (2.56)	61.8 (2.43)	59.9 (2.36)	55.0 (2.17)	53.7 (2.11)	73.7 (2.90)	54.9 (2.16)	632.8 (24.91)
Average precipitation days (≥ 1.0 mm)	11.3	10.1	9.0	8.9	8.7	10.5	10.3	10.1	9.5	11.5	12.3	11.6	123.8
Source: Met Office

== Religion and education ==
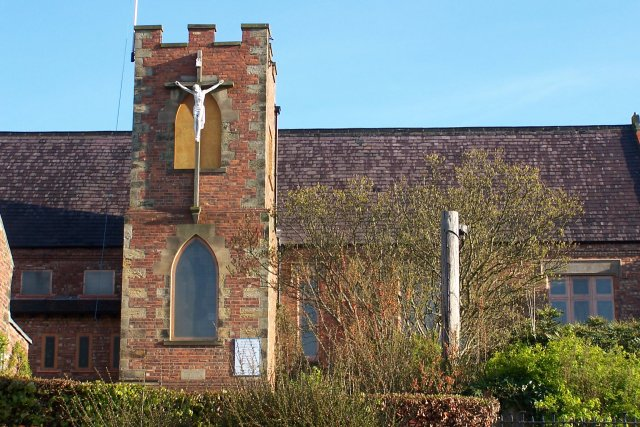
St Joseph and St Cuthbert

The two main churches in the town are St Leonard's (Church of England), and St Joseph and St Cuthbert (Roman Catholic). The former United Reformed Church building is now an arts studio and venue.

There are three primary schools: St.Joseph's RCVA Primary School, Handale Primary School, and Hummersea.

== Transport ==
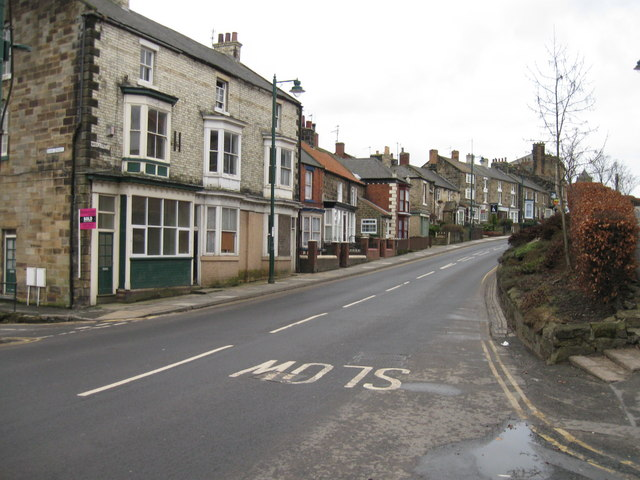
The High Street (A174)

The A174 is the town’s main road. Loftus railway station opened in 1875, and closed to passengers in 1960. The line still operates through the station site, with freight services for Boulby Mine, and occasional passenger 'specials' for rail enthusiasts. The nearest open station is at Saltburn.

== Community and culture ==
Loftus parish includes the settlements of Boulby, Carlin How, Cowbar (in Staithes), Easington, Handale, Liverton Mines, Liverton, Loftus, Scaling and Skinningrove.

Loftus' facilities include the Loftus Swimming Baths, Loftus Youth Club, Loftus Army Cadets, Scouts, Cubs, Rainbows, Brownies & Guides. The town also has a Taekwondo Studio - Loftus Martial Arts & its own dance studio - Triple Dee Dance Studio - which offers dance classes for children age two upwards. The studio started inside the town hall and later the company moved into their own studio on Zetland Road and then moved on again to a larger studio on Zetland Road (formerly Trinders). It also has a fire station and part-time police station.

Loftus Town Hall was commissioned by Lawrence Dundas, 3rd Earl of Zetland, erected by a Thomas Dickinson of Saltburn, and was first opened in 1879.

Tees Valley Leisure Limited, which was established in 1999 as an industrial and provident society, provides a variety of leisure services on behalf of Redcar & Cleveland Borough Council operating for the benefit of the community as a non-profit distributing organisation. They took over the running of Loftus Leisure Centre, which had been opened in 1981 to provide the community with swimming facilities. The centre was improved with the addition of a sauna suite in 1985 and a fitness suite in 1998.

== Sport ==
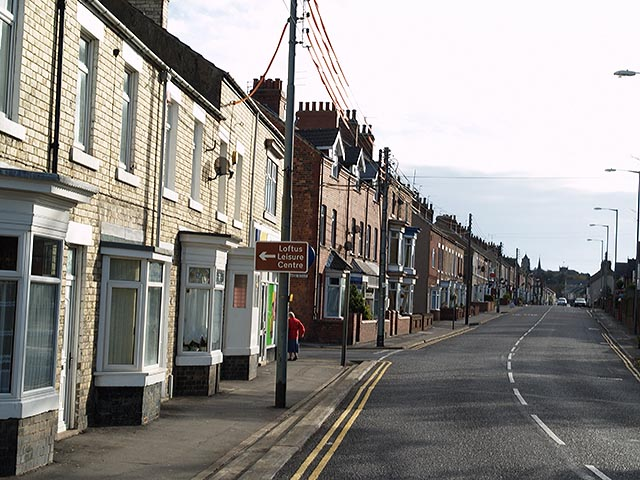
Row of houses in Loftus

Loftus Cricket & Athletic Club is situated at the eastern end of Loftus on Whitby Road. The club have two senior teams: a Saturday 1st XI that compete in the Langbaurgh Cricket League and a Midweek Senior XI in the Esk Valley Evening League.

The town's original association football club, Loftus F.C., was one of the first in the north-east of England, being founded in 1877 and lasting until 1905. A later club, Loftus Albion, reached the semi-final of the FA Amateur Cup in 1921.

== Notable people ==
Among notable people who were born in or lived in Loftus were geologist Lewis Hunton (1814–1838), actress Faye Marsay born in 1986 and table tennis player Paul Drinkhall born in 1990.

== See also ==
- Boulby Mine, near Loftus
- List of Royal Observer Corps Posts
