= Middlesbrough Cenotaph =

War memorial in North Yorkshire, England

- United Kingdom
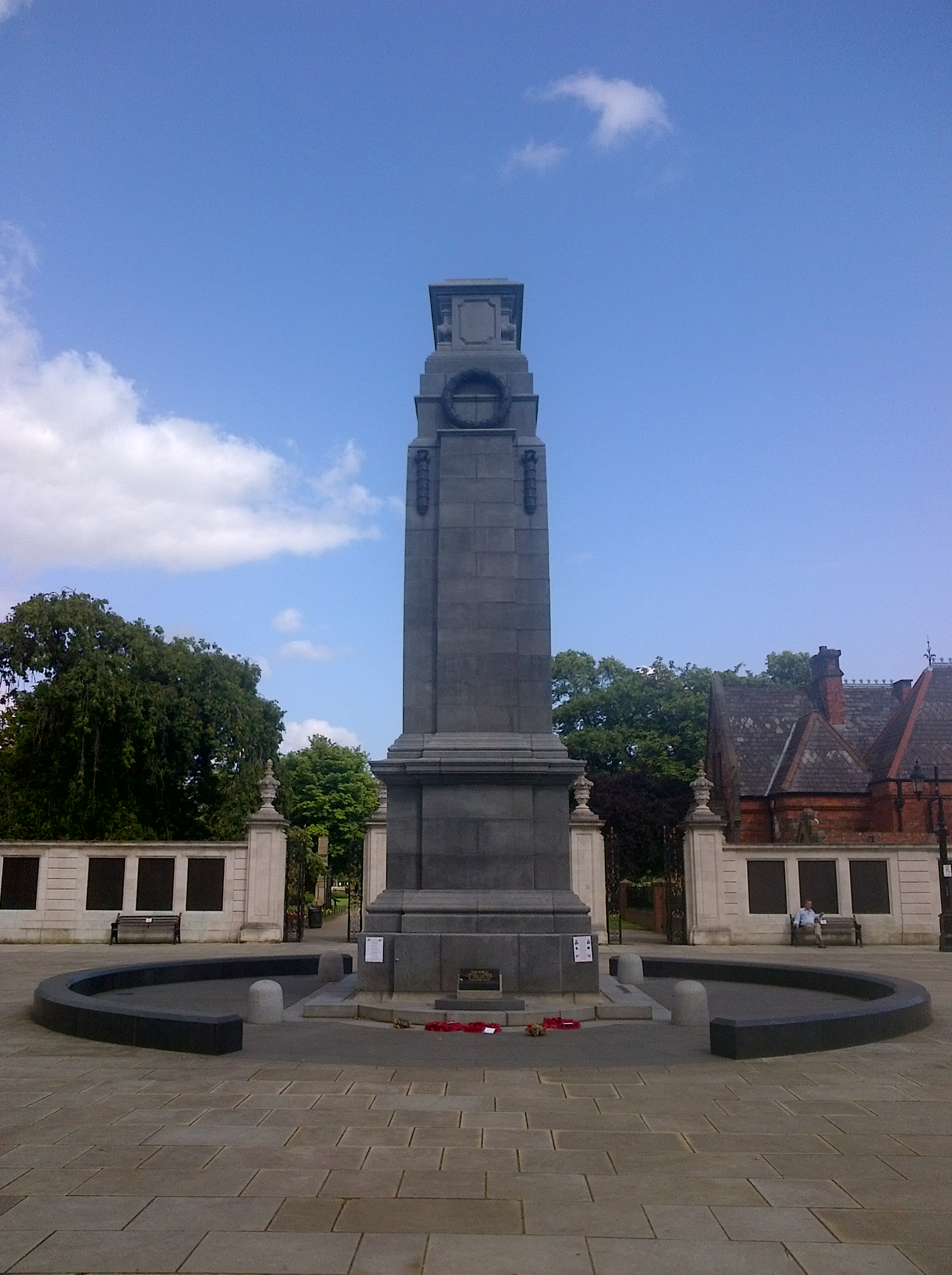
- Middlesbrough Cenotaph
- For the British Empire (later Commonwealth) dead of both World Wars, and the British military in later wars
- Unveiled: 11 November 1922
- Location: 54°33′53.52″N 1°14′26.40″W

The Middlesbrough Cenotaph is a war memorial situated in Middlesbrough, North Yorkshire, England. It is located just off Linthorpe Road outside the entrance gates to Albert Park in front of the Dorman Museum. It commemorates the local men who died in the First and Second World Wars and other conflicts.

The cenotaph was built on land given by Sir Arthur Dorman who favoured a replica of The Cenotaph in Whitehall, London. The cenotaph was designed by Brierley and Rutherford of York based on the Whitehall cenotaph, and built in 1922 by masons Messrs Coxhead of Middlesbrough at a cost of over £17,000. It was unveiled on 11 November that year by the deputy mayor of Middlesbrough J.G. Pallister in memory of over 3,000 local men from the Yorkshire Regiment and others who died in the First World War. The cenotaph was constructed using polished grey Aberdeen granite ashlar and stands over 10m high. After the Second World War the cenotaph was rededicated to those who died in that conflict and other wars. The north and south faces of the monument are inscribed with the epitaph "THE GLORIOUS DEAD 1914–1919, 1939–1945".

The Cenotaph and surrounds were restored and improved in 2008 at a cost of £275,000. Work included cleaning and pointing, pedestrianisation of the surrounding area, and improved lighting.
