= Carlin How =

Village in North Yorkshire, England

Coordinates: 54.564°N 0.907°W

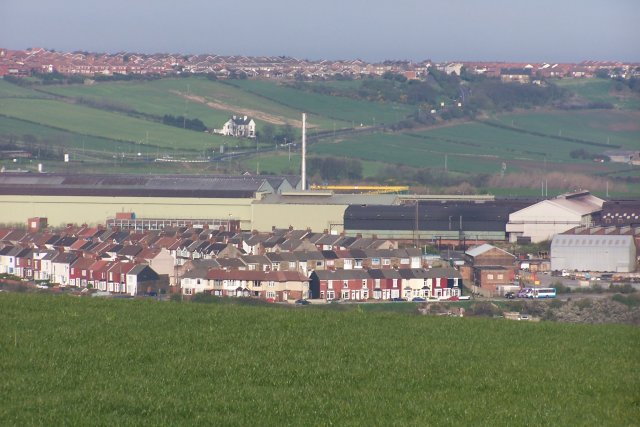
British Steel's Skinningrove Works dominate this view of Carlin How

Carlin How is a village in the borough of Redcar and Cleveland and the ceremonial county of North Yorkshire, England.

== Notable people ==
- Alfred Myers, ironstone miner, one of the Richmond Sixteen, First World War conscientious objectors.
