= Filey =

Seaside town and civil parish in North Yorkshire, England

Coordinates: 54°12′35″N 0°17′20″W

- Town
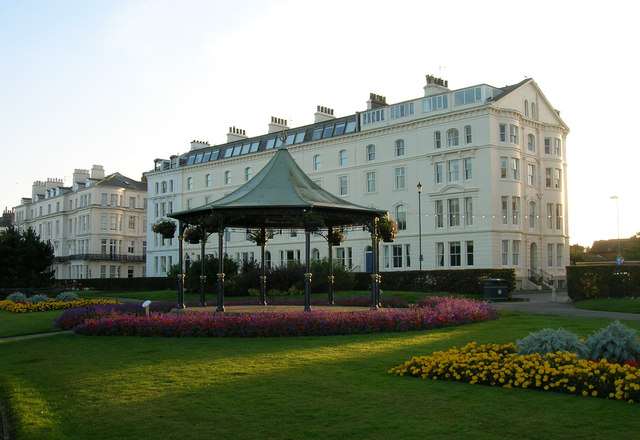
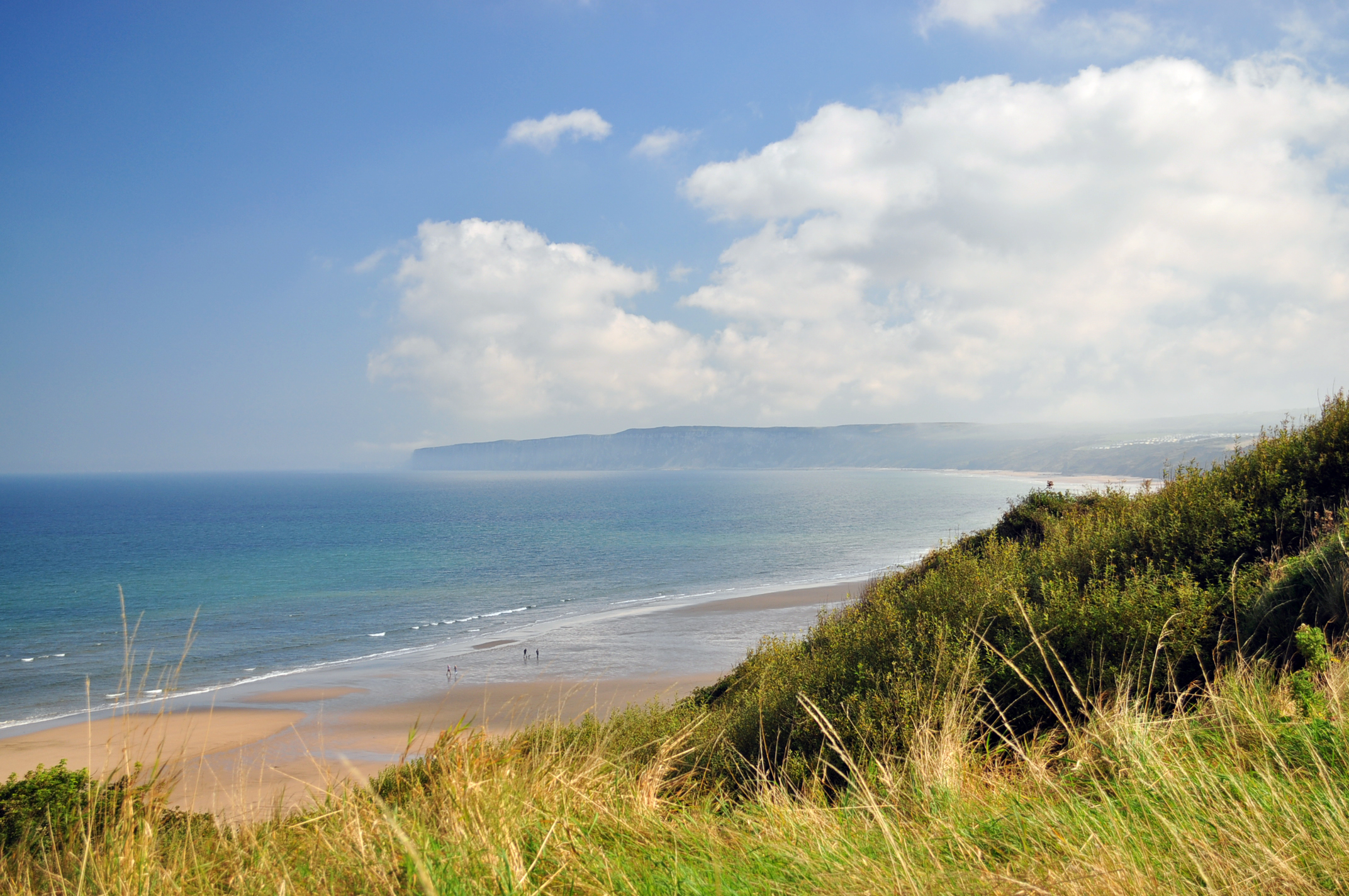
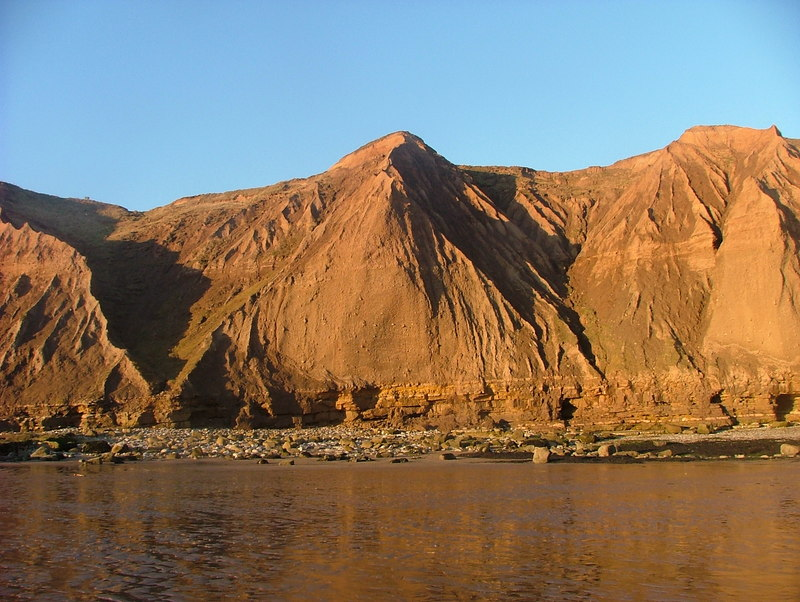
- From the top, Crescent Gardens, The Beach, Filey Brigg

- Coat of arms

- Location within North Yorkshire
- Area: 3.29 sq mi (8.5 km^{2})
- Population: 6,981 (2011 census)
  - Density: 2,122/sq mi (819/km^{2})
- OS grid reference: TA115807
- Unitary authority: North Yorkshire
- Ceremonial county: North Yorkshire
- Region: Yorkshire and the Humber
- Country: England
- Sovereign state: United Kingdom
- Post town: FILEY
- Postcode district: YO14
- Dialling code: 01723
- Police: North Yorkshire
- Fire: North Yorkshire
- Ambulance: Yorkshire
- UK Parliament: Thirsk and Malton

Filey (/ˈfaɪli/) is a seaside town and civil parish in North Yorkshire, England. It is located between Scarborough and Bridlington on Filey Bay. Although previously a fishing village, it has a large sandy beach and became a popular tourist resort. According to the 2011 UK census, Filey parish had a population of 6,981, in comparison to the 2001 UK census population figure of 6,819, and a population of 6,870 in 1991.

Filey was historically mainly within the East Riding of Yorkshire, although until 1888 a small part of the town, including its parish church, was in the North Riding of Yorkshire. In 1974 the town was transferred to the new county of North Yorkshire.

== Geography ==
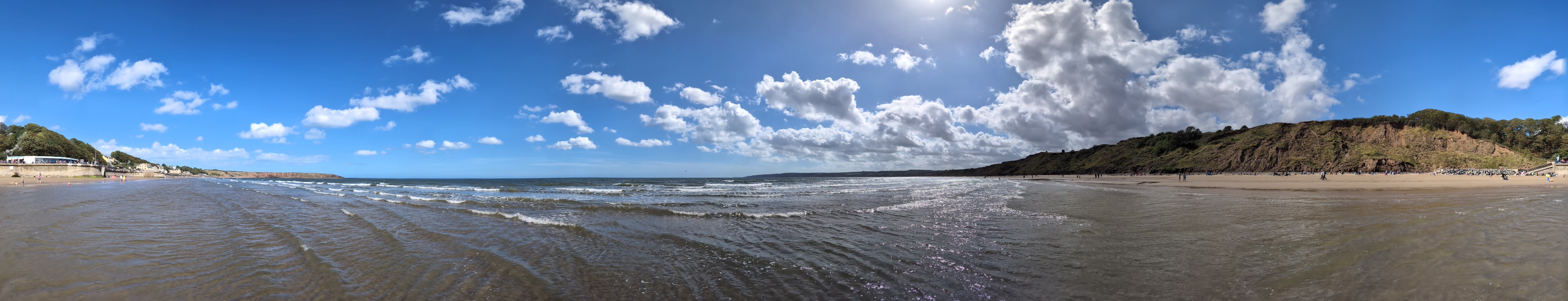
A 360 degree panoramic view of Muston Sands in Filey, looking along the coast from the shoreline, 31 August 2025.

Filey is at the eastern end of the Cleveland Way, a long-distance footpath; it starts at Helmsley and skirts the North York Moors. It was the second National Trail to be opened (1969). The town is at the northern end of the Yorkshire Wolds Way National Trail which starts at Hessle and crosses the Yorkshire Wolds. Filey is the finishing point for Great Yorkshire Bike Ride. The 70-mile (110 km) ride begins at Wetherby Racecourse.

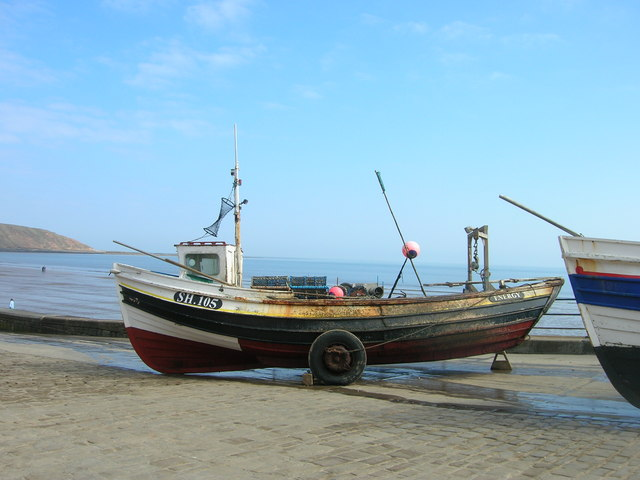
Fishing boats on the Sea-front

Filey has a railway station on the Yorkshire Coast Line. A second station at Filey Holiday Camp railway station to the south of the town served the former Butlins holiday camp. The camp has since been re-developed into a 600-home holiday housing development, The Bay Filey. It is one of the largest coastal developments of this kind in the UK and the first homes were completed in 2007.

In July 2007 Filey was hit by flash floods which caused major problems.

Climate data for Scarborough, North Yorkshire: Average maximum and minimum temperatures, and average rainfall recorded between 1991 and 2020 by the Met Office.
Month	Jan	Feb	Mar	Apr	May	Jun	Jul	Aug	Sep	Oct	Nov	Dec	Year
Mean daily maximum °C (°F)	6.7 (44.1)	7.1 (44.8)	9.1 (48.4)	11.4 (52.5)	14.0 (57.2)	16.9 (62.4)	19.2 (66.6)	19.1 (66.4)	16.7 (62.1)	13.1 (55.6)	9.5 (49.1)	7.0 (44.6)	12.5 (54.5)
Mean daily minimum °C (°F)	2.0 (35.6)	2.0 (35.6)	3.1 (37.6)	5.0 (41.0)	7.4 (45.3)	10.1 (50.2)	12.2 (54.0)	12.4 (54.3)	10.5 (50.9)	7.9 (46.2)	4.6 (40.3)	2.4 (36.3)	6.66 (43.99)
Average precipitation mm (inches)	56.9 (2.24)	48.8 (1.92)	45.5 (1.79)	50.4 (1.98)	45.2 (1.78)	65.5 (2.58)	56.6 (2.23)	69.5 (2.74)	57.3 (2.26)	68.4 (2.69)	73.4 (2.89)	68.0 (2.68)	705.5 (27.78)
Average precipitation days (≥ 1.0 mm)	12.1	11.5	9.5	9.1	8.3	9.9	10.0	10.2	9.4	11.6	13.0	12.8	127.3
Mean monthly sunshine hours	56.3	83.5	117.9	164.8	213.8	189.3	201.3	188.5	142.5	101.9	64.9	54.2	1,578.8
Source: Met Office

== History ==
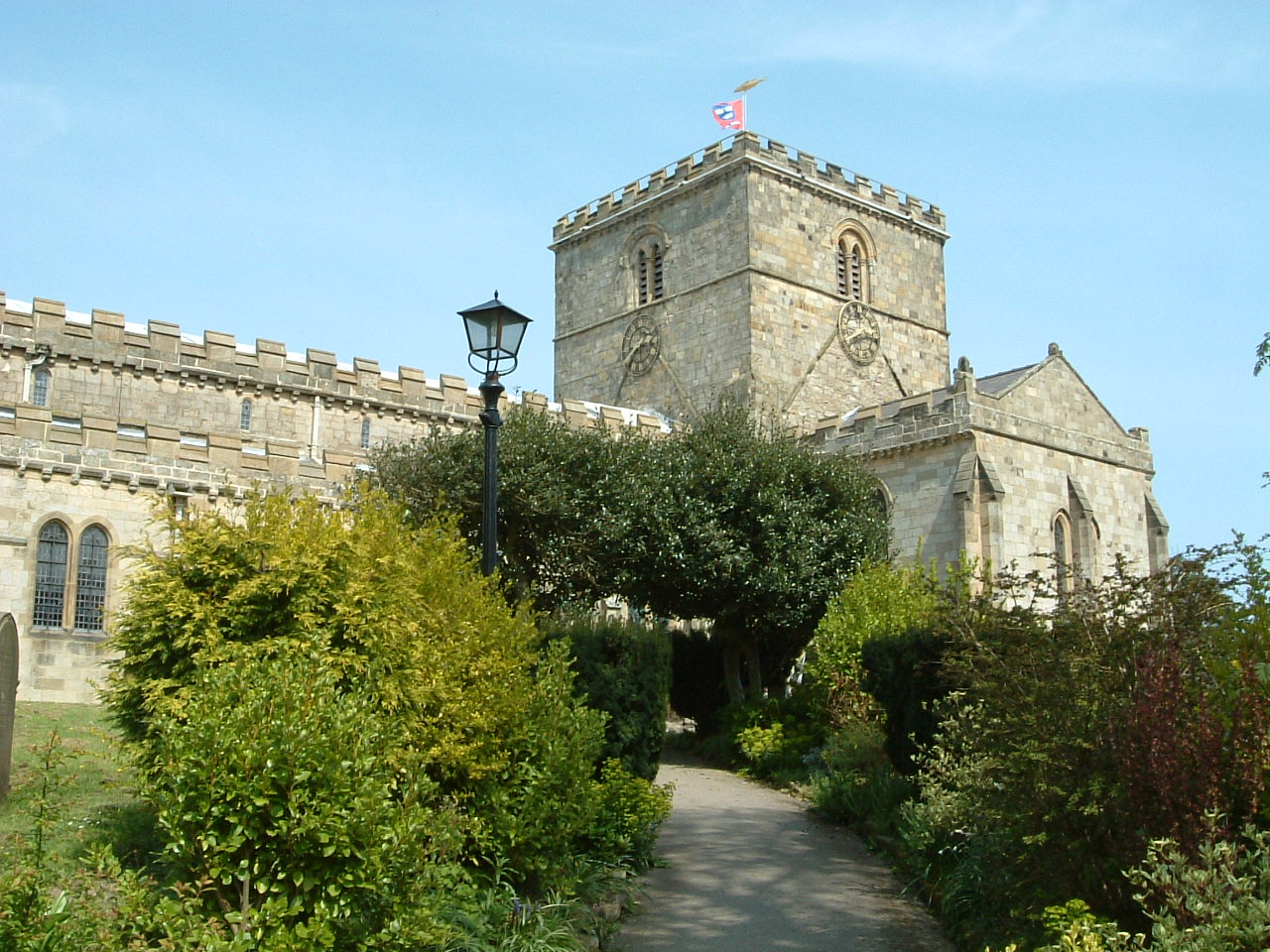
St Oswald's Church

In 1857 the foundations of a 4th-century Roman signal station were discovered at the Carr Naze cliff edge at the northern end of Filey Bay. The structure is 160 feet (50 m) long with a square tower 46 feet (14 m) wide, a defensive ditch and ramparts from a later era. Excavations at the time of the find and subsequently in the 1920s and 1990s uncovered Roman pottery and hoards of coins. The site is a protected Scheduled Monument. The find of Roman remains supports the case for Filey being the Roman settlement of Portus Felix.

The origin of the name Filey is uncertain. One theory derives it from the Old English fīfelēg meaning 'monster island' referring to the shape of a rock projection at the shore. Other theories derive it from fīflēah meaning 'five woods or clearings' or from the Old Norse fífa meaning 'cottongrass' and the Old English lēah meaning 'wood or clearing'.

The 12th century parish church dedicated to St Oswald, on Church Hill in the north of the town, is a Grade I listed building. It is the oldest building in Filey and Nicholas Pevsner wrote "This is easily the finest church in the NE corner of the East Riding" (Buildings of England). St Oswald's has nearly 1,500 pieces of well-preserved medieval graffiti on the roof of the tower, ranging from initials up to complicated images of fully rigged sailing vessels, including one known as a Whitby Cat. The graffiti covers around 400 years of Filey's history, and maps out identifiable people, their occupations, changes in literacy and coastal shipping, the start of tourism in the area, and even a possible record of 17th century plague. The graffiti was recorded and analysed by Historic England in 2016.

Filey was a small village until the 18th century when visitors from Scarborough arrived seeking the peace and quiet that Filey then offered. In 1835 a Birmingham solicitor called John Wilkes Unett bought 7 acres (2.8 ha) of land and built the Crescent, later known as the Royal Crescent, which was opened in the 1850s. On several occasions in the mid-19th century, the novelist Charlotte Brontë visited Filey with the aim of recovering her faltering health. In June 1852 she wrote to her father: "The Sea is very grand. Yesterday it was a somewhat unusually high tide - and I stood about an hour on the cliffs yesterday afternoon - watching the tumbling in of great tawny turbid waves - that make the whole shore white with foam and filled the air with a sound hollower and deeper than thunder.

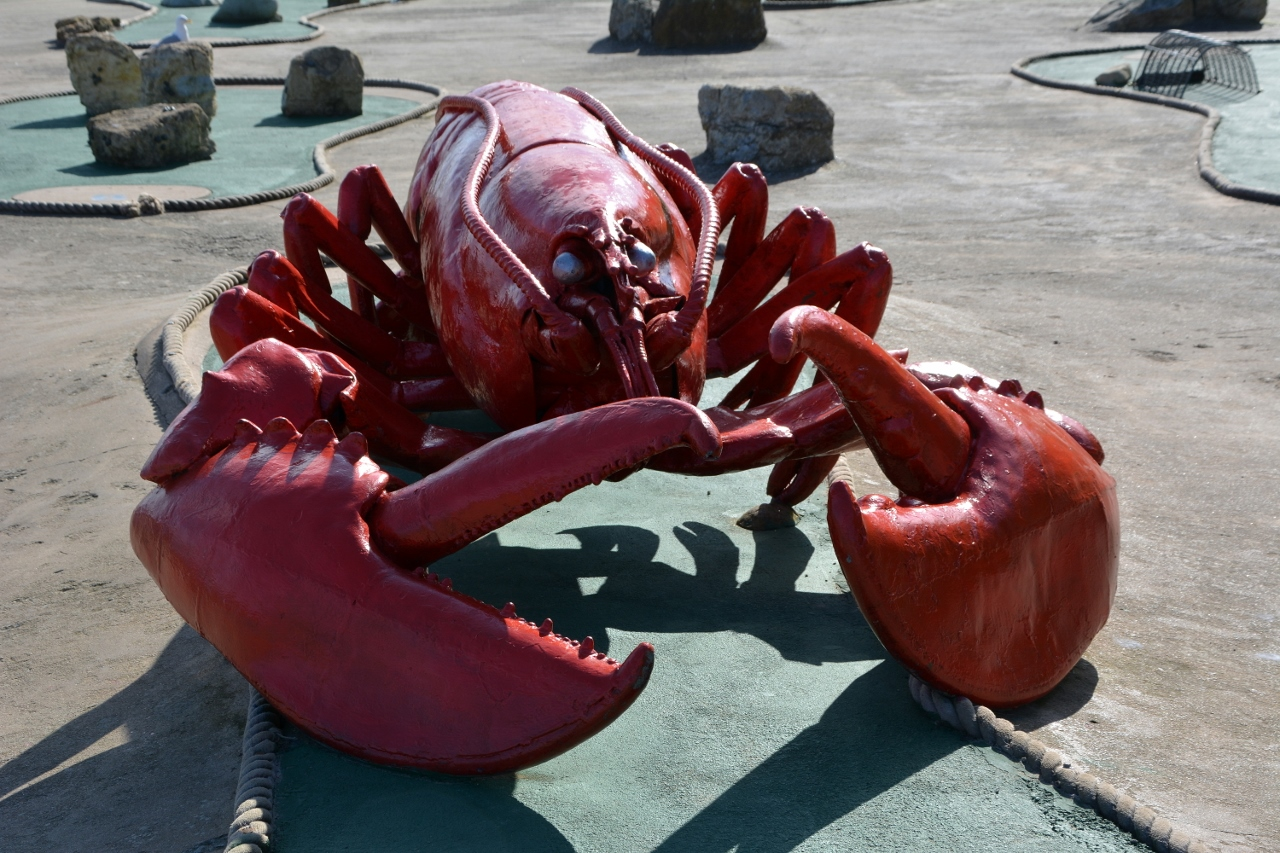
The Lobster sculpture

Fishing at Filey has been a tradition for centuries, with most of those undertaking it coming from a long line of fishermen and women in their families. The fishing boats at Filey are cobles, like most of the others along the Yorkshire and North East coasts, and the catch is mostly sea trout. Limitations have been placed upon how and where they use their nets, which also trap salmon; some fear this may lead to the end of the fishing industry in Filey. In 1804, a lifeboat was procured for the town and it became a Royal National Lifeboat Institution asset in 1852. Filey Lifeboat Station is still in existence and has an inshore and an all-weather boat on station. The all-weather lifeboat was replaced in early 2021 with an Atlantic 85 vessel.

English composer Frederick Delius stayed as a boy on the Crescent with his family at Miss Hurd's boarding house (number 24) in 1876 and 1877, and then at Mrs Colley's (number 24) in 1897.

In 1931 the spire of a church was damaged by the Dogger Bank earthquake.

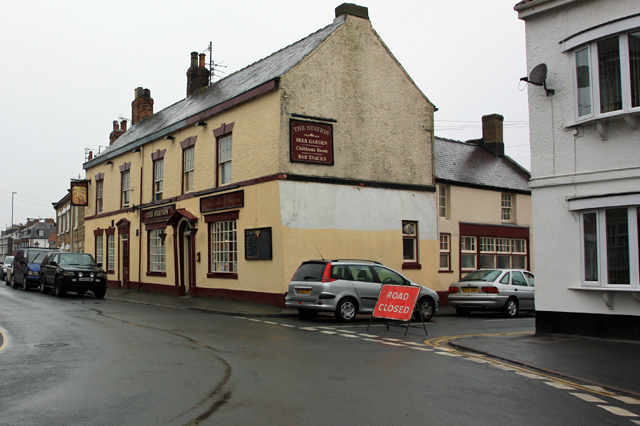
The Station Pub

For more than 40 years Butlin's Filey Holiday Camp was a major factor in Filey's economy. Building began in 1939 and continued during the Second World War when it became an air force station known as RAF Hunmanby Moor. In 1945 it became a popular holiday resort and a new LNER branch line with station was constructed to serve the camp despite the topographical challenges involved. It opened on 10 May 1947 with a performance by the London International Orchestra conducted by Anatole Fistoulari with a performance by acclaimed pianist Solomon. British boxer Bruce Woodcock was convalescing at the Butlin's camp around the same time following his punishing defeat at the hands of Joe Baksi a month earlier. By the late 1950s it could cater for 10,000 holiday makers but closed in 1984, causing a decrease in the holiday makers visiting Filey.

Filey was historically split between the East Riding of Yorkshire and the North Riding of Yorkshire. The boundary ran along Filey Beck, north of the town centre, so that most of the town was in the East Riding. When County Councils were formed by the Local Government Act 1888, the whole of Filey was placed in the East Riding.

Filey also boasts the Grade II listed Langford Villa on The Crescent (c. 1830) which was often chosen by the famous chocolatier Sir Joseph Terry as his place to "summer"; it is situated next door but one to The White Lodge Hotel.

In 2018, the town was featured in the Tour de Yorkshire.

== Governance ==
Filey Town Council
- Seal

Type
- Type: Town Council

Leadership
- Mayor: Jacqui Houlden-Banks
- Deputy Mayor: Linda Randall
- Town clerk: David Liddle

Structure
- Seats: 13 Councillors
- Length of term: 4 years
- Independent: 11 / 13
- Vacant: 2 / 13

Elections
- Voting system: Plurality-at-large
- Last election: 5 May 2022
- Next election: TBC

Meeting place
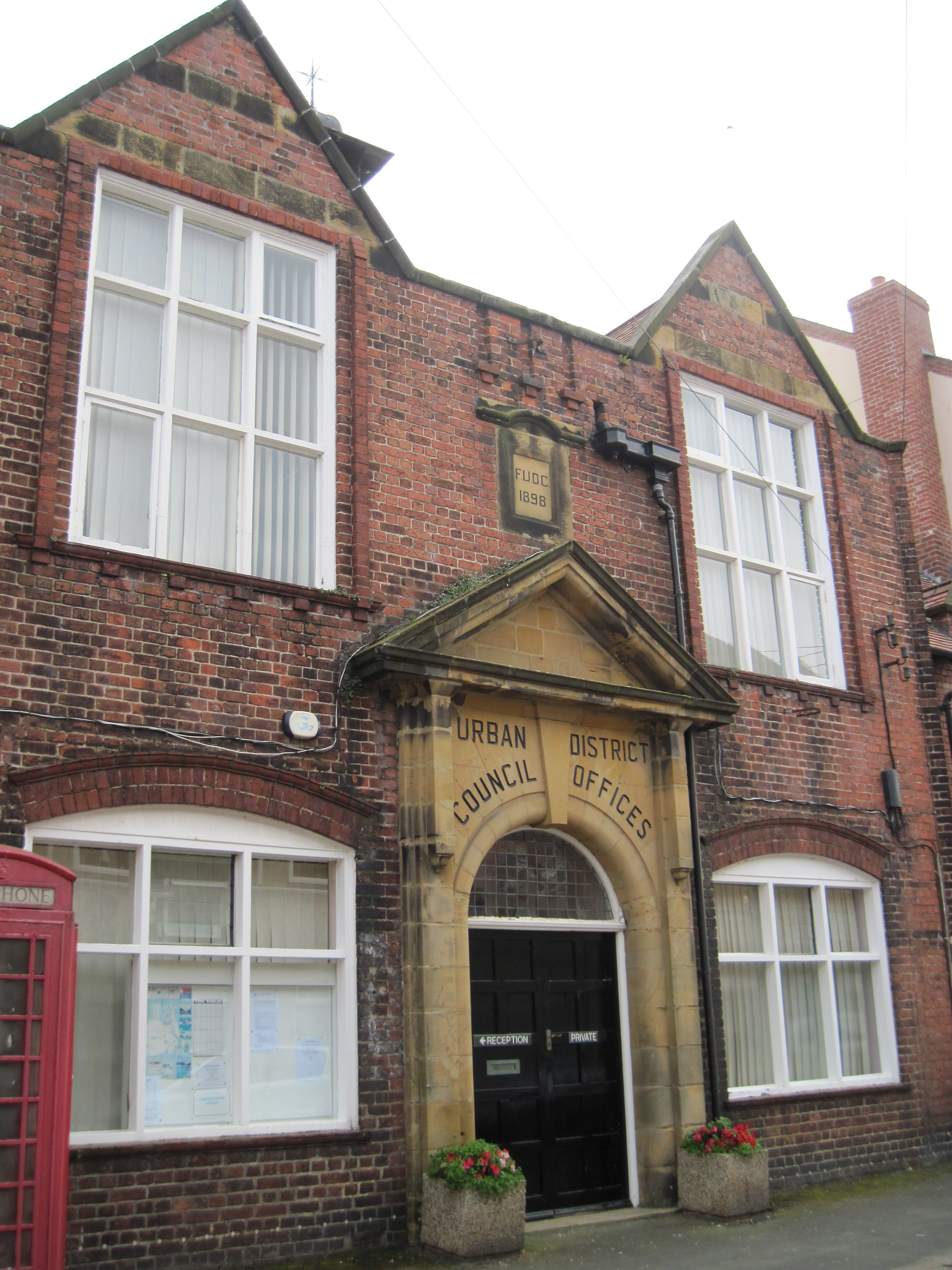
- Filey Town Council Offices

Website
- www.fileytowncouncil.co.uk

At the lowest level of governance is Filey Town Council, electing a total of thirteen councillors. These councillors are responsible for burial grounds, allotments, play areas and some street lighting. Elections to the town council are held every four years and the most recent elections were held in May 2019. The Mayor of Filey is elected annually by the members of the town council. The council is based at Filey Town Council Offices on Queen Street.

At district level, the town was part of the Scarborough Borough Council area. The town was represented by three councillors on the Borough Council. On the North Yorkshire County Council the town elected one representative. Both councils were abolished in 2023 and replaced with a unitary authority, North Yorkshire Council.

=== Parliamentary representation ===
Filey was in the Ryedale constituency until the 2010 general election when it became part of the newly formed Thirsk and Malton constituency. Proposed boundary changes to the constituencies, would see Filey be moved from Thirsk and Malton into the Scarborough and Whitby constituency.

== Development ==
Coast & Country Housing Limited plan to build 300 houses in Filey. Scarborough council has approved plans for the £45 million housing project off Muston Road by Coast & Country. Independent councillor Sam Cross, who represents Filey on the borough council, said: "The infrastructure of the town can't cope with it." Coast and Country replied to the concerns by stating that the houses are being built to meet a pent-up latent demand for affordable housing and other housing within the town.

== Local media ==
Local news and television programmes are provided by BBC Yorkshire and ITV Yorkshire. Television signals are received from the Oliver's Mount and via a local relay transmitter at Hunmanby. BBC North East and Cumbria and ITV Tyne Tees can also be received from the Bilsdale TV transmitter.

Filey's local radio stations are BBC Radio York on 95.5 FM, Greatest Hits Radio Yorkshire Coast on 96.2 FM, Coast & County Radio on 97.4 FM and This is The Coast that broadcasts online and on DAB.

Local newspapers are Filey Bay Today and The Scarborough News.

== Notable people ==
- Leo Blair, the father of Tony Blair, former Prime Minister of the United Kingdom was born in Filey.
- Edmund Crawford, footballer, Liverpool & Clapton Orient
- Andy Crawford, footballer, Derby County & Blackburn Rovers
- Honor Fell (1900–1986), zoologist, was born at Fowthorpe, near Filey.

== See also ==
- Listed buildings in Filey
- Filey School
- Scarborough Pottery
