= Marske =

Marske may refer to:

== Places ==
- Marske, Richmondshire, a village in North Yorkshire, England
- Marske-by-the-Sea, Redcar and Cleveland, a large village, North Yorkshire, England
  - Marske railway station
- New Marske, Redcar and Cleveland, a village south-west of Marske-by-the-Sea

== Other uses ==
- Marske (horse), a thoroughbred racehorse and sire
- Marske United F.C., an English football club in Marske-by-the-Sea
