= Saltburn =

Saltburn may refer to:

== Places ==
- Saltburn-by-the-Sea, North Yorkshire, England
- Saltburn Gill, North Yorkshire, England, Site of Special Scientific Interest in Saltburn-by-the-Sea
- Saltburn, Ross and Cromarty, Highland, Scotland
- Saltburn, Saskatchewan, in Rural Municipality of Lacadena No. 228, Saskatchewan, Canada

== Media ==
- Saltburn (film), a 2023 film
  - Saltburn (soundtrack), the soundtrack to the film
