= Huntcliff School =

Huntcliff School may refer to:

- Huntcliff School, Kirton in Lindsey, a secondary school in Lincolnshire, England
- Huntcliff School, Saltburn-by-the-Sea, a secondary school in North Yorkshire, England
