= The Ship, Saltburn-by-the-Sea =

Listed pub in North Yorkshire, England

The Ship
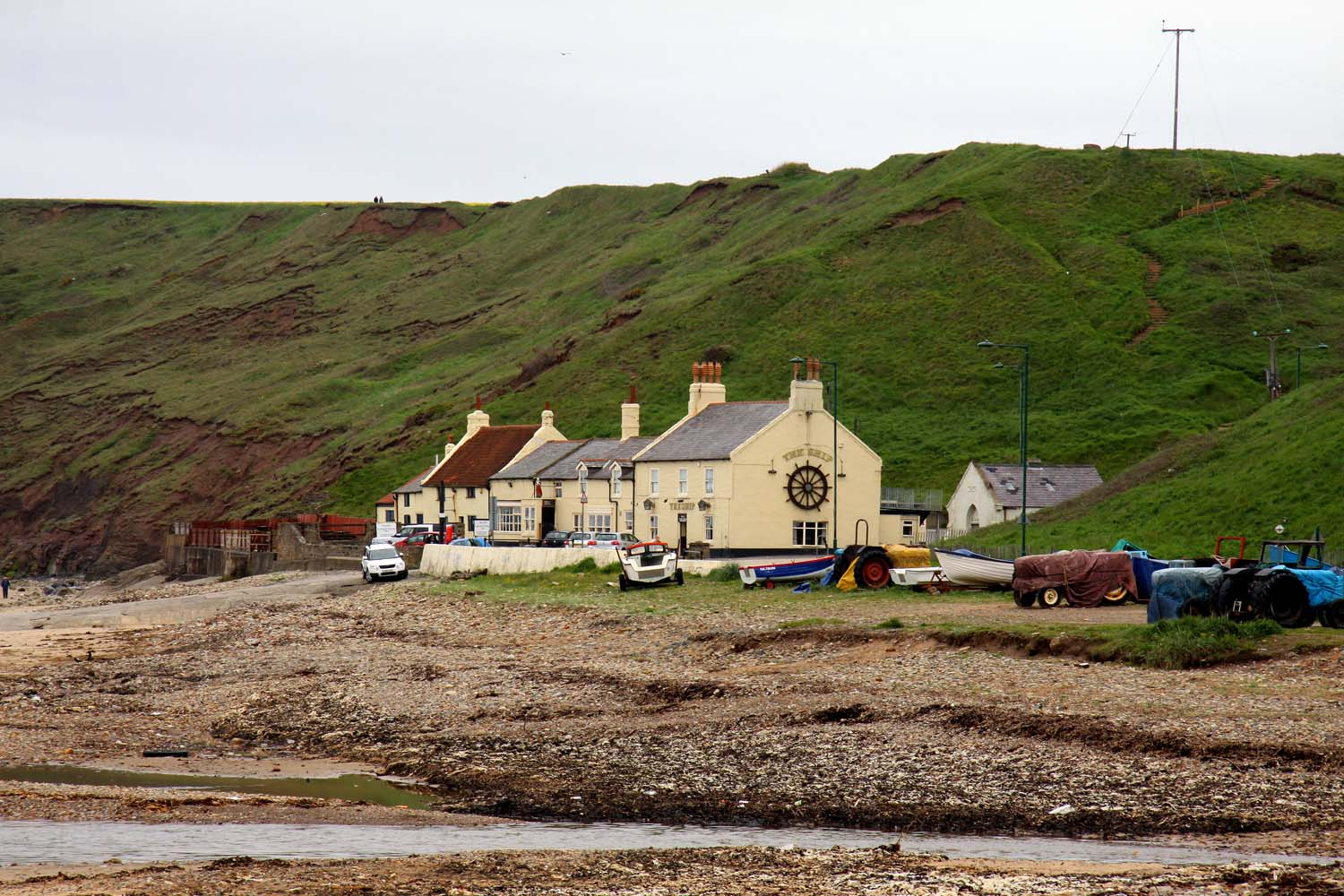
- The pub in 2012
- Alternative names: The Ship Inn

General information
- Type: Public house; originally a house and fishermen's cottages
- Location: Saltburn Road, Saltburn-by-the-Sea, North Yorkshire, England
- Coordinates: 54.585°N 0.965°W
- Years built: Late 18th century (house); Early 19th century (cottages)
- Renovated: 20th century (altered)
- Owner: Greene King

Design and construction
- Designations

Listed Building – Grade II
- Official name: The Ship public house
- Designated: 11 June 1973
- Reference no.: 1387570

Website
- Official website

The Ship is a historic public house on Saltburn Road in Saltburn-by-the-Sea, a seaside town in Redcar and Cleveland, England. The pub dates from the late 18th century and is the oldest in Saltburn, having formed part of the original fishing village before the later town was developed on the opposite side of Skelton Beck following the arrival of the railways. It was historically associated with smuggling due to its proximity to the North Sea, and the building is now a Grade II listed structure.

== History ==
The Ship public house (sometimes called The Ship Inn) and the adjacent Ship House are the only two surviving buildings from what is known as Old Saltburn, the fishing village on the right bank of Skelton Beck that predated the development of Saltburn-by-the-Sea. The history of a pub on the site dates back to the 1500s, and the oldest bar is the one that adjoins the wall next to the road. The pub was used frequently by smugglers, and in the late 18th and early 19th centuries its landlord, John Andrew, was known locally as the "King of the Smugglers", with the pub serving as a base for his smuggling operations.

When Andrew arrived in Saltburn, The Ship was not the only pub in the small hamlet; other establishments included The Seagull and The Nimrod. Until 1881 the pub also served as a mortuary for the village, and later the expanded town. The bodies of those who drowned and washed up on the beach were stored there pending a post-mortem.

Besides its association with smuggling, a path at the rear (landward) side of the pub leads to the Saltburn-to-Whitby section of the Cleveland Way. The pub and the beach in front of it (to the north) were used in 2015 for scenes in the ITV drama Dark Angel about Mary Ann Cotton.

The pub re-opened in August 2023, with its own fish and chip stall and a renovated beer garden overlooking the North Sea. The building is a Grade II listed structure.
