= LGK =

LGK could refer to:

- Langkawi International Airport, Malaysia; IATA airport code LGK
- Longbeck railway station, England; National Rail station code LGK
