= New Marske =

Village in North Yorkshire, England

Coordinates: 54.58177°N 1.04084°W

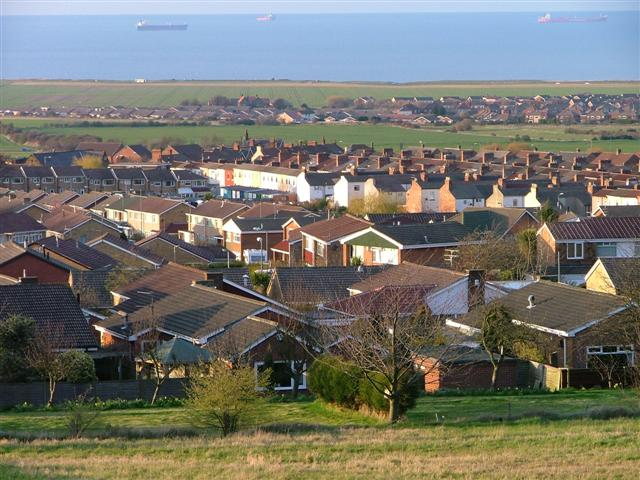
- View of New Marske from Errington Woods

- Location within North Yorkshire
- Population: 3,271 2011 census
- OS grid reference: NZ620211
- Civil parish: Saltburn, Marske and New Marske
- Unitary authority: Redcar and Cleveland
- Ceremonial county: North Yorkshire
- Region: North East
- Country: England
- Sovereign state: United Kingdom
- Post town: REDCAR
- Postcode district: TS11
- Dialling code: 01642
- Police: Cleveland
- Fire: Cleveland
- Ambulance: North East
- UK Parliament: Redcar

New Marske is a village in North Yorkshire, England, a mile south-west of Marske-by-the-Sea on a hillside. It was originally a group of miners' terraced houses.

Longbeck railway station links it to Saltburn, Middlesbrough and Darlington. New Marske is near an area of woodland called Errington Woods, in which are the remains of disused mine workings.

The original mining settlement is commemorated with a series of plaques placed at various locations, depicting events and scenes of life in the 19th century.

New Marske is the birthplace of Johanna Jackson, the first British woman to win a major race walk title at the 2010 Commonwealth Games.

== Demographics ==
The population was 3,271 in the 2011 census.
