= MSK =

MSK may refer to the following:

- Common abbreviation for Human musculoskeletal system
- Marinestosstruppkompanie, German naval assault troops
- Postal code for Marsaskala, Malta
- Station code for Marske railway station, England
- Medullary sponge kidney
- Medvedev–Sponheuer–Karnik scale, a macroseismic intensity scale
- Memorial Sloan Kettering Cancer Center
- Minimum-shift keying radio modulation
- Mohammad Sidique Khan, a perpetrator of the July 2005 London bombings
- Moscow
- Moscow Time
- MSK (professional wrestling), a professional wrestling tag team
- Museum of Fine Arts, Ghent (Dutch: Museum voor Schone Kunsten), Belgium
- Premier Sports, UK TV channel, formerly MSK
