= Outwood Academy Bydales =

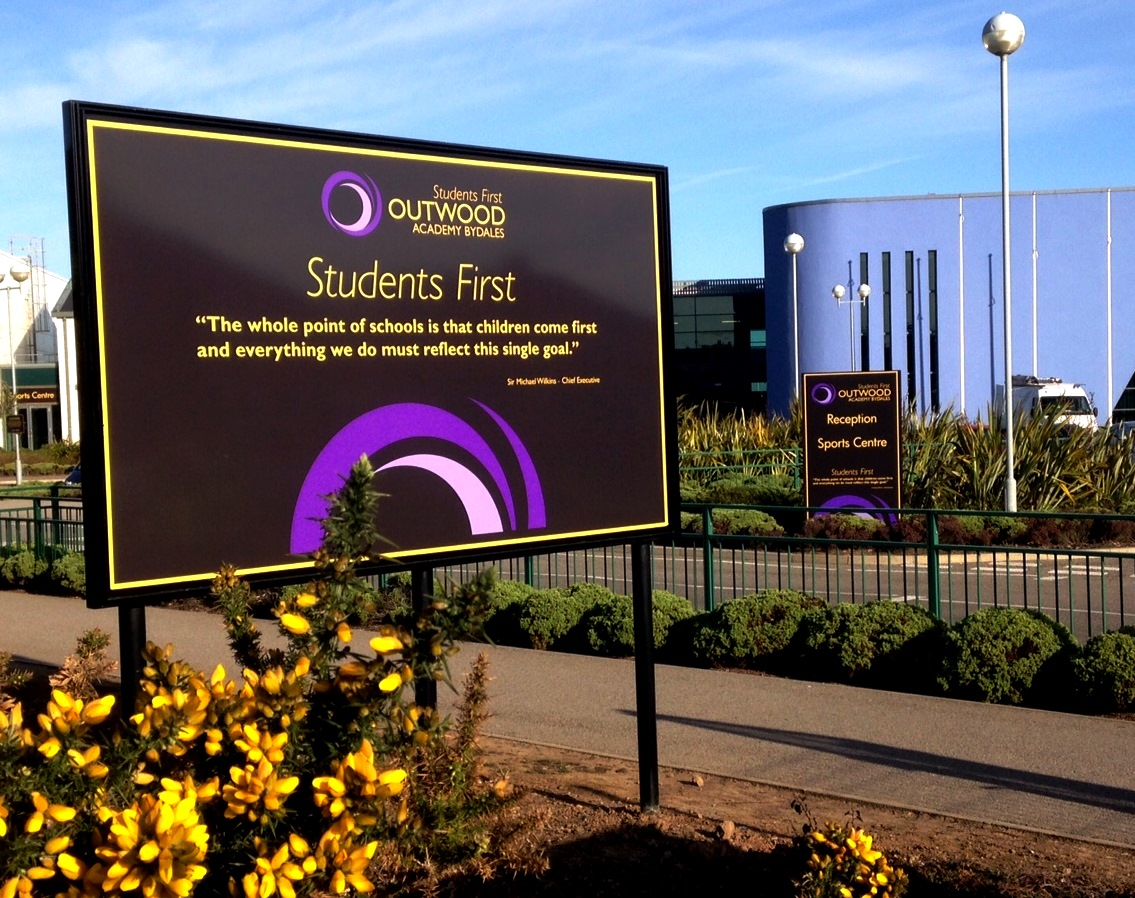

Location
- Marske-by-the-Sea, North Yorkshire, TS11 6AR; England
- Coordinates: 54°35′46″N 1°01′21″W

Information
- Type: Academy
- Motto: Students First
- Local authority: Redcar and Cleveland
- Department for Education URN: 141399 Tables
- Ofsted: Reports
- Chair of Governors: Patricia Taylor
- Principal: Robert McGreal
- Gender: Mixed
- Age: 11 to 16
- Enrolment: 839 (September 2019)
- Capacity: 850
- Houses: Asia; Africa; Americas; Oceania
- Colours: Purple and gold
- Website: www.bydales.outwood.com

Outwood Academy Bydales (formerly Bydales School) is a mixed secondary school with academy status in Marske-by-the-Sea, North Yorkshire, England. It has a comprehensive admissions policy and in 2019 had an enrolment of 839 pupils.

The school is operated by Outwood Grange Academies Trust, and the current principal is Robert McGreal.

== History ==
Outwood Academy Bydales was previously Bydales School until 31 January 2015. Prior to this it was Marske County Modern School, built in 1965.

The original school buildings were demolished after completion of a new PFI building that was opened to pupils on 2 November 2006. The new school buildings – which received criticism over its aesthetics, being described by a resident as "a terrible mess" with "huge liquorice allsorts" on the roof – were officially opened by local MP Vera Baird on 7 November 2007. The same day the school's fair trade shop began trading.

The school was accepted, with 114 other schools, onto the trust school programme in April 2008.

In 2008, 61% of pupils achieved 5A*-C GCSEs, including English and maths.

The school won the 'DCSF Award for Sustainable Schools in the North-East and Cumbria' in the Teaching Awards 2009.

The school was inspected by Ofsted on 5 December 2013 where it was placed into special measures. This was a drop from its previous Outstanding grading in February 2011 under the leadership of Head Teacher Tony Hobbs.

The school's headteacher Alasdair Kesson resigned in December 2013, a year after joining the school.

On 19 June 2014 the school was announced to become a 'sponsored Academy', joining the Outwood Grange Family of Schools due to Bydales 'special measures' status. On 10 June 2014 the Evening Gazette published an article giving more details about the sponsor arrangements. The school was removed from special measures when it became an academy in February 2015. In October 2015 it was announced by Ofsted that new academies would not be inspected until their third year of opening.

In the first year as Outwood Academy Bydales the number of students achieving 5+A*-C GCSE grades including English and maths rose to 73% some 12% higher that the previous historical best. As a result, it was named in the top three schools for attainment in Teesside for 2015, and first for progress made of students, being in the top 3% of similar schools. The school also had the highest 'Best 8 value-added' score for the Tees Valley in 2015. An article in the Evening Gazette in March 2015 reported the improvements made in the school. In January 2018 the school was rated as outstanding by Ofsted.

After joining the Outwood Grange Family of Schools, Bydales School was renamed Outwood Academy Bydales, converting to an academy on 1 February 2015. The uniform has also transitioned to the new Outwood style, initially with ties handed out to students, followed by the full uniform in January 2015 including blazers.

== Facilities ==
Outwood Academy Bydales has a small wind turbine, solar panels and a hydrogen fuel cell.

== Uniform ==
Black blazer, white shirt, black trousers, purple and gold tie and black shoes that can be polished

== Notable people ==
Land Speed Record holder Andy Green grew up in Marske and attended Bydales. Singer and songwriter Georgina Anderson from Marske, also attended Bydales. Sean Rose, winter Paralympian (alpine skiing) and World Disabled Water Ski Champion, left Bydales School in 1987.
