= Skelton Beck =

River in North Yorkshire, England

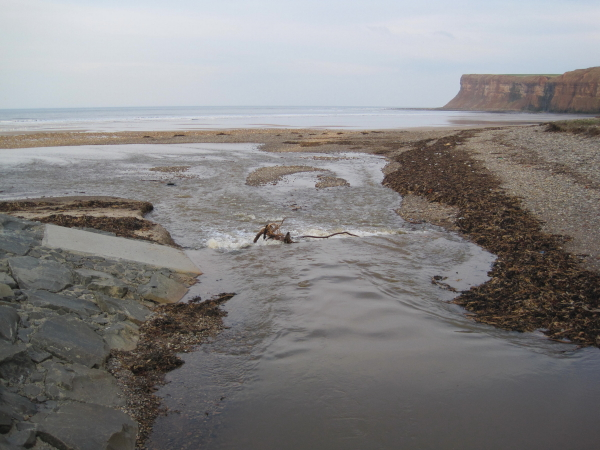
- Skelton Beck flows onto the Beach at Saltburn

- Location within North Yorkshire
- Etymology: Skelton-in-Cleveland

Location
- Country: England
- County: North Yorkshire; Yorkshire (historical)

Physical characteristics
- Source
  - location: Tocketts Mill
  - coordinates: 54.553°N 1.023°W
  - elevation: 57 metres (187 ft)
- Mouth
  - location: Saltburn
  - coordinates: 54.585°N 0.967°W
  - elevation: 5 metres (16 ft)
- Length: 23.57 kilometres (14.65 mi)
- Basin size: 54.11 square kilometres (20.89 sq mi)

Basin features
- EA waterbody ID: GB103025071970

Skelton Beck is a small river in North Yorkshire, England. The beck only runs for 23 kilometres (14 mi) and feeds directly into the North Sea on the south side of Saltburn beach. The beck is noted for occasionally being polluted with wastewater from the abandoned ironstone workings in its headwaters.

== Course ==
From Skelton Mill to the beach at Saltburn, the beck runs through a deep ravine which averages a depth of 150 feet (46 m) and a width sometimes as narrow as 100 yards (91 m). It generally follows a north-easterly direction, rising as several smaller streams between Eston and Guisborough. Several modifications have been carried out on the beck including a weir near Upleatham to power a mill, and a small dam was built on the beck at Saltburn to create a pond and water for Valley Gardens in the town.

In its lower reaches, the gorge that the beck flows through just before it crosses onto Saltburn beach is known as Saltburn Valley.

== Name ==
The beck is named after the village of Skelton, one of the locations that it flows through. The name Skelton derives from most likely from an Old Norse word Skjellaen, meaning clatter or splash. This could mean that although Skelton is named in 1086, the river name could be the origin of the village name, with the beck first being documented in 1407. Upstream, the beck carries several names such as Tocketts Beck, Howl Beck, and Skelton Ellers Beck.

== Hydrology and pollution ==
The beck runs for 23.57 kilometres (14.65 mi) and drains an area of 54.11 square kilometres (20.89 sq mi). It is listed as having poor ecological status due to the minewater pollution from the former ironstone workings in the area.

The beck has suffered several pollution incidents:

- In 1890, several incidents of pollution from Brotton Beck, resulted in a move to have the tidal portion of the beck declared a stream under the Rivers Pollution Prevention Act 1876. This would enforce the polluters to deal with the pollution.
- In June 2009, at least 1,000 fish died when pollution from waste paints and solvents seeped into the beck near Saltburn.
- In March 2012, pig slurry leaked into the beck between Guisborough and Saltburn.
- In February 2022, whilst work was being undertaken on Cat Nab car park at the mouth of the beck, a sewage pipe was breached and this leaked out into the beck and also then onto the beach at Saltburn.

The beck's lower reaches also suffers from tributaries bringing ironstone waste from abandoned mines into Skelton Beck. Concerns have been raised locally at Saltburn as to the bathing water quality on the beach because of this pollution. The water in Saltburn Gill does not support any marine life due to the pollution, and it is estimated that 100 tonnes (110 tons) of dissolved iron ore is discharged on Saltburn beach each year.

To combat this, the Coal Authority installed a water treatment plant on Saltburn Gill consisting of two lagoons which allows the iron to precipitate and sink to the bottom of the lagoons before the water flows out into the stream.

== Wildlife ==
The beck is noted for being one a handful in Yorkshire that supports a sea trout and a salmon population for breeding. This is governed by and Environment Agency catch and release policy which requires all types to be released when caught. Whilst the beck has had a natural population of sea trout, up to 84,000 were released into the beck in 2015 to replenish stocks after a mass pollution incident in 2012.

== Industry ==
Skelton Beck historically supported three corn mills, one at Tocketts, one at Skelton, and one at Marske. The mill at Skelton was also used to grind bone and to generate electricity. Both Tocketts and Skelton are listed with Historic England (grade II* and grade II respectively), and Tocketts Mill has been restored to working order and still produces flour. Skelton Mill, which was first mentioned in 1272, was partially destroyed by bombing during the Second World War, and was also partially demolished for road improvements in the 1960s. The beck also had smaller mills at Howl Beck, West Mill, and Swathey Head.

Ironstone workings were found along either side of the beck, particularly Longacres Pit, which was built almost on top of the water. This has had a stark effect on the water quality, even long after the mines all closed.
