= St Germain's Churchyard =

Cemetery in Yorkshire, England

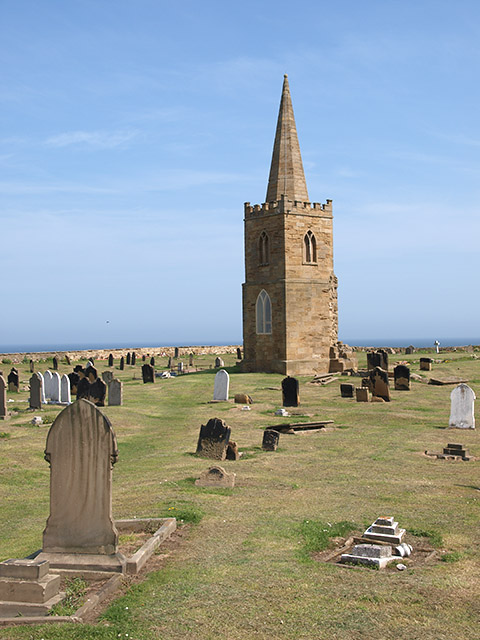
- St Germain's church tower
- Interactive map of St Germain's Churchyard

Details
- Closed: 1956
- Location: Marske-by-the-Sea, Redcar and Cleveland, North Yorkshire
- Country: England
- Coordinates: 54.594°N 1.011°W
- Website: Friends of St Germains
- Find a Grave: St Germain's Churchyard

St Germain's Churchyard is a large cemetery overlooking the North Sea at Marske-by-the-Sea, North Yorkshire, England. Its church tower is a grade II listed structure at the midpoint to the yard and a landmark for sailors out on the sea. It is a remnant of a demolished church, services at St Germain's were replaced in 1876 by St Mark's.

== History ==
At least two, possibly three churches are believed to have been erected on the site, with the church being dedicated to St Germain. (Note: Sometimes misspelt as St German. St Germain was one of the Parisian bishops who visited Britain to denounce the Pelagian Heresy.) The land for building the church upon was given to the village by Earl Tostig. According to contemporary records, the church was consecrated by Egelric, who was bishop of Durham between 1042 and 1056. In the early 19th century, the Church of St Germain was in a ruinous state, and so was rebuilt between 1820 and 1821, with the rebuilding seeing all of the church bar the tower destroyed by gunpowder. The rebuilt church continued to serve the village until the newer parish church of St Marks, was built in 1867. The village is believed to have migrated westwards in Medieval times, leaving the church isolated from the rest of the village to the east, on the clifftop. The creation of the newer and larger parish church, was driven by an influx of workers who had come to work in the ironstone industry, which had developed in the area from the 1850s. At the same time as the church was abandoned, the newer Parish of Redcar was created from parts of the parishes of Marske-by-the-Sea and Upleatham.

The old church of St Germain's, was demolished in 1955, but the church tower was left standing on its own in the churchyard. The tower was a prominent local landmark used by sailors on the North Sea for navigation. The bell in the tower, which was over 550 years old, was placed in the tower of the St Mark's.

The graveyard contains 17 Commonwealth War Graves from both the First and Second World Wars including those from the nearby First World War aerodrome, which was just to the west of the graveyard. Captain Cook's father, also himself called James Cook, was buried in the graveyard at St Germain's in 1779, two months after his son's death. He was unaware that his son had been killed in Hawaii. At least 50 ironstone miners, killed between 1860 and 1920 at Upleatham Mine, are buried at St Germains. The graveyard also contains the bodies of sailors and passengers who drowned at sea; often on Redcar Rocks, which the tower overlooks.

The graveyard continued to be used for burials even after the newer church was erected in 1867, and was eventually closed in 1956, but smaller plots for ashes have been installed around the edges since closure to interments. The tower was grade II listed in 1967.

== Zetland family vault ==
Underneath the chancel was the vault of the Zetland family, who resided mainly at nearby Upleatham Hall. Several family members were buried in the vault;

- George Dundas (1834)
- John Dundas (1866)
- Robert Lawrence Dundas (1844)
