= Redcar East railway station =

Railway station in North Yorkshire, England

Redcar East
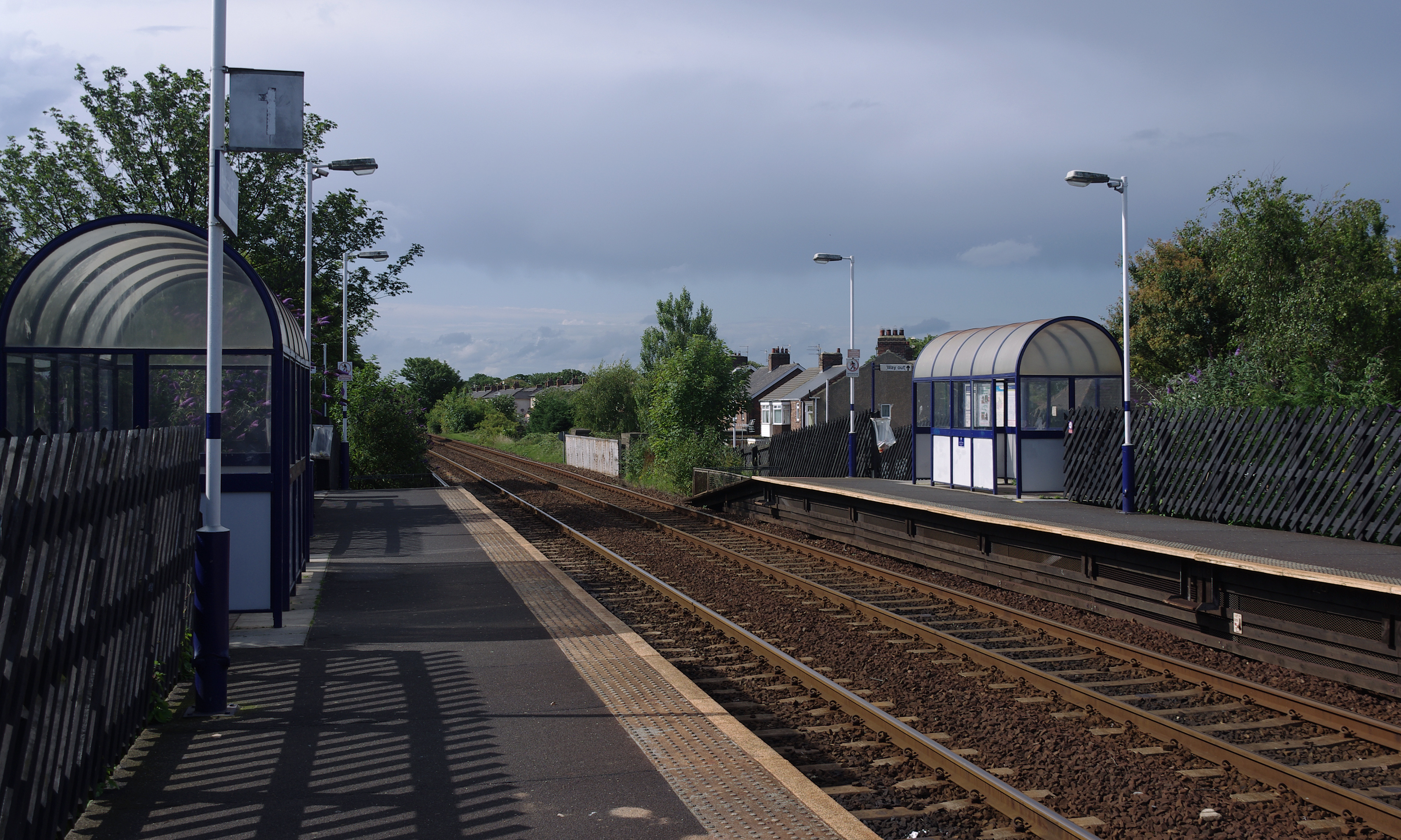

General information
- Location: Redcar, Redcar and Cleveland; England
- Coordinates: 54°36′33″N 1°03′07″W
- Grid reference: NZ613241
- Owner: Network Rail
- Manager: Northern Trains
- Platforms: 2
- Tracks: 2

Other information
- Station code: RCE
- Classification: DfT category F1

History
- Original company: London and North Eastern Railway
- Post-grouping: London and North Eastern Railway; British Rail (North Eastern Region)

Key dates
- 8 July 1929: Opened as Redcar East Halt
- 1937: Renamed Redcar East

Passengers
- 2021/22: ▲74,208
- 2022/23: ▲82,882
- 2023/24: ▲93,274
- 2024/25: ▲0.106 million
- 2025/26: ▲0.107 million
Location
- Location within North Yorkshire
Notes
- Passenger statistics from the Office of Rail and Road

Redcar East is a railway station on the Tees Valley Line, which runs between Bishop Auckland and Saltburn via Darlington. The station, situated 8 miles 60 chains (14.1 km) east of Middlesbrough, serves the seaside town of Redcar, Redcar and Cleveland in North Yorkshire, England. It is owned by Network Rail and managed by Northern Trains.

== Tees Valley Metro ==
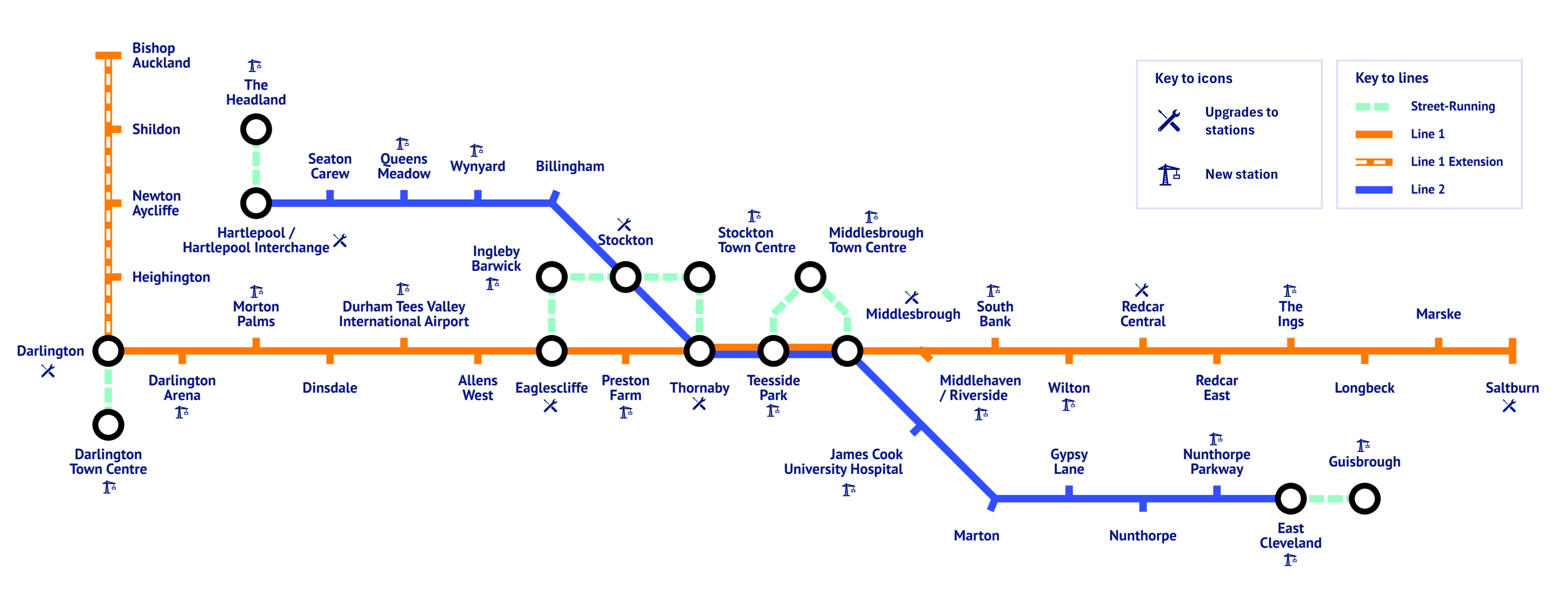
Transit diagram showcasing all discussed or mentioned ideas for the Tees Valley Metro.

Starting in 2006, Redcar East was mentioned within the Tees Valley Metro scheme. This was a plan to upgrade the Tees Valley Line and sections of the Esk Valley Line and Durham Coast Line to provide a faster and more frequent service across the North East of England. In the initial phases the services would have been heavy rail mostly along existing alignments with new additional infrastructure and rollingstock. The later phase would have introduced tram-trains to allow street running and further heavy rail extensions.

As part of the scheme, Redcar East station would have received improved service to Darlington (1–2 to 4 trains per hour) and new rollingstock.

However, due to a change in government in 2010 and the 2008 financial crisis, the project was ultimately shelved. Several stations eventually got their improvements and there is a possibility of improved rollingstock and services in the future which may affect Redcar East.

== Facilities ==
The station is unstaffed, so passengers wishing to travel must buy tickets before boarding or on the train. In 2014, the station facilities were improved. The package for this station included new fully lit waiting shelters, renewed station signage, digital CIS displays and the installation of CCTV. The long-line Public Address system (PA) has been renewed and upgraded with pre-recorded train announcements.

== Services ==
As of the May 2021 timetable change, the station is served by two trains per hour between Saltburn and Darlington via Middlesbrough, with one train per hour extending to Bishop Auckland. An hourly service operates between Saltburn and Bishop Auckland on Sunday. All services are operated by Northern Trains.

Rolling stock used: Class 156 Super Sprinter and Class 158 Express Sprinter

Preceding station	National Rail	Following station
Longbeck	Northern Trains; Tees Valley Line	Redcar Central
