= Georgina Anderson =

- Born: 22 October 1998; Marske-by-the-Sea, North Yorkshire, England, UK
- Died: 14 November 2013 (aged 15)
- Genres: Pop
- Occupation: Singer
- Instruments: Vocals and guitar
- Years active: 2012–2013

Georgina Anderson (22 October 1998 – 14 November 2013) was a singer from Marske-by-the-Sea, North Yorkshire. On 14 November 2013 she died after being diagnosed with stage four liver cancer. Her posthumous 2013 single, "Two-Thirds of a Piece" reached number 63 on the UK Singles Chart.

== Music career ==
In April 2013, Anderson uploaded a cover version of Bonnie Raitt's "I Can't Make You Love Me" to YouTube. The video accumulated over 300,000 views. In early November, Anderson's second YouTube song—"Two-Thirds of a Piece"—was played to 14,000 fans at Middlesbrough F.C. with Anderson in attendance. "Two-Thirds of a Piece" was released posthumously on 15 November, and had peaked at number 63 on the UK Singles Chart.

== Death ==
Anderson died at age 15 after being diagnosed with stage four liver cancer, having failed all available treatment options for her condition.

== Discography ==
=== Singles ===
Year	Title	Peak chart positions	Album
Year	Title	UK	Album
2013	"Two-Thirds of a Piece"	63	Non-album single
