= Marske-by-the-Sea =

Village in North Yorkshire, England

Coordinates: 54.5910°N 1.0190°W

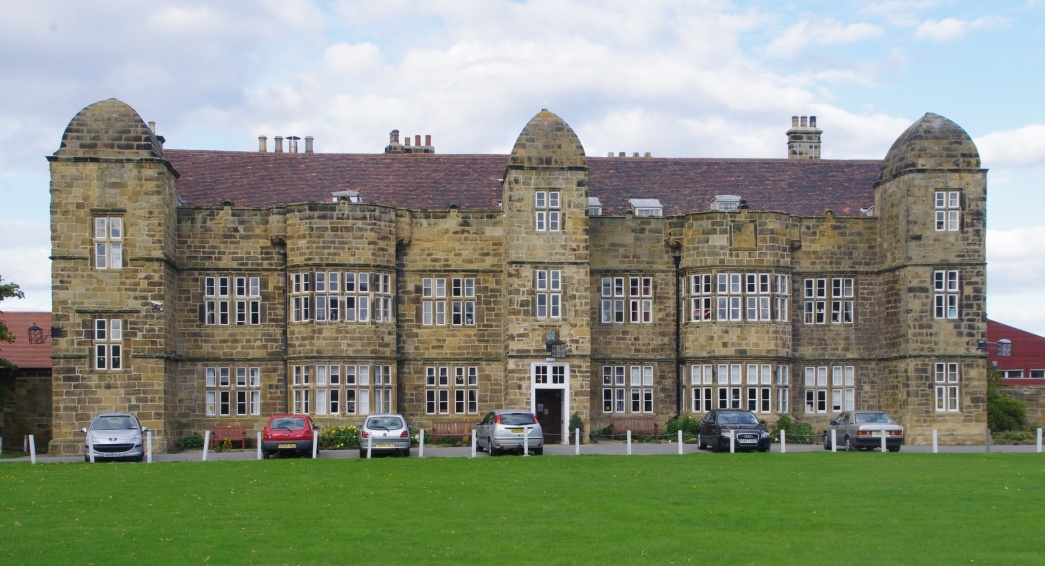
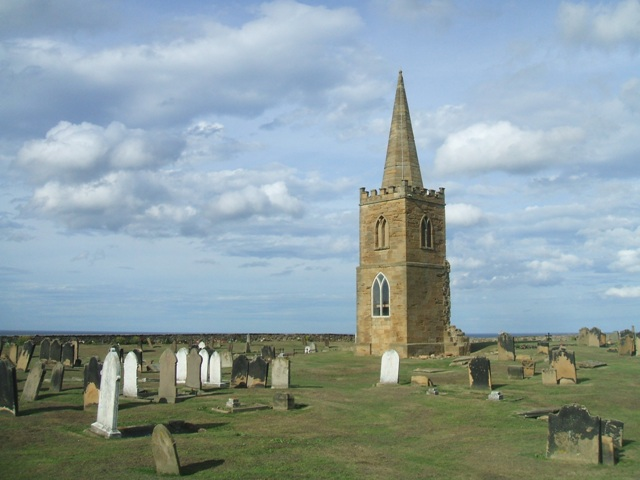
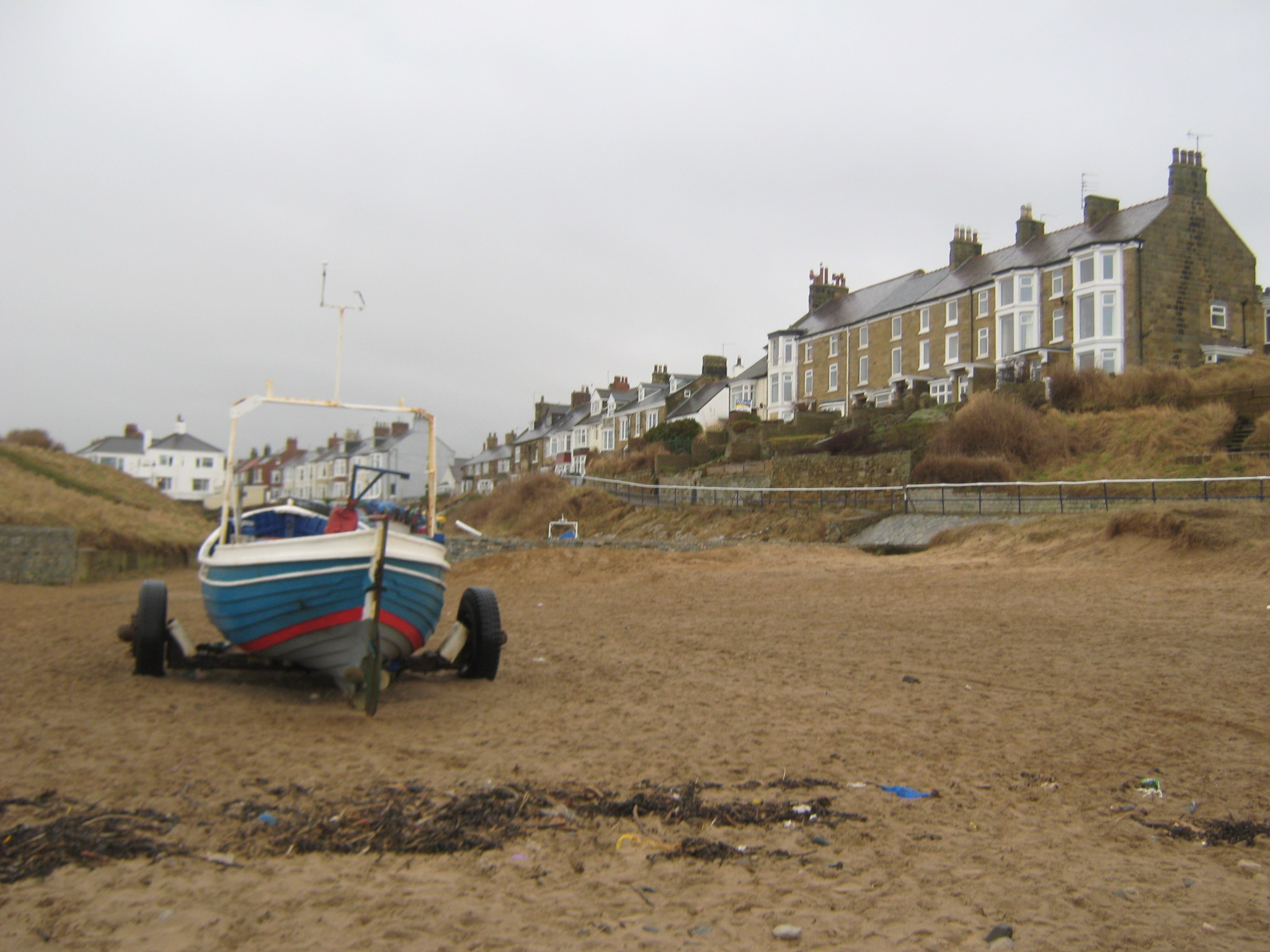
- Left to right; top: Marske Hall; Bottom: St Germain's Churchyard and Marske Sands

- Location within North Yorkshire
- OS grid reference: NZ634222
- Civil parish: Saltburn, Marske and New Marske
- Unitary authority: Redcar and Cleveland
- Ceremonial county: North Yorkshire
- Region: North East
- Country: England
- Sovereign state: United Kingdom
- Post town: REDCAR
- Postcode district: TS11
- Dialling code: 01642
- Police: Cleveland
- Fire: Cleveland
- Ambulance: North East
- UK Parliament: Redcar

Marske-by-the-Sea is a village in the civil parish of Saltburn, Marske and New Marske, North Yorkshire, England, between the seaside resorts of Redcar and Saltburn-by-the-Sea.

Marske comprises the wards of Longbeck (shared with New Marske) and St Germains.

== History ==
The name Marske derives from the Old English mersc meaning 'marsh'.

Marske is mentioned in Domesday Book of 1086. St Germain's Church was consecrated by bishop Ægelric between 1042 and 1056. Marske was amerced 20 marks for its part in the pillaging of a Norwegian vessel in 1180.

Marske Brass Band was established in 1875. It has a junior and adult learners band and a traditional brass band for all ages. The band provides instruments and teaching free, the only proviso being regular attendance.

=== World War One airfield ===
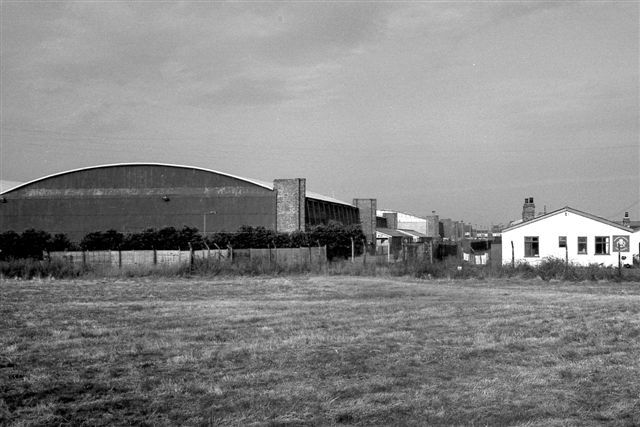
RFC/RAF base in Marske

In 1917 the Royal Flying Corps adopted the civilian aerodrome just to the west of Marske, expanding it into a military training establishment. In April 1918 it came under the control of the newly formed Royal Air Force, with one of the first RAF flying instructors being 'Captain' W. E. Johns, the author of the Biggles books. Shortly after the end of World War One the airfield was closed.

After the Second World War the site of the aerodrome became an ICI depot and later a housing estate, known as The Landings, with roads named on an aeronautical theme: Avro Close, Blackburn Grove, De Havilland Drive – leading onto Vickers Lane–, Beardmore Avenue, Folland Drive, Wellington Close, Brabazon Drive, Halifax Close, Spitfire Close and Lysander Court.

== Politics ==
=== Parish and district ===
Marske is part of the Saltburn, Marske and New Marske parish. The parish was in Guisborough Rural District from 1894 to 1932 and Saltburn and Marske-by-the-Sea Urban District from 1932 to 1974. on 1 April 1974 the parish was abolished and merged with Saltburn by the Sea to form Saltburn and Marske by the Sea. In 1961 the parish had a population of 6791.

=== Wapentake and borough ===
The area was historically in the Langbaurgh Wapentake, also known as Cleveland. The village was part of a Cleveland namesake county under 1974 reforms until the 1996 reforms. The 1974 reforms also placed the village under Langbaurgh borough, which was renamed Langbaurgh-on-Tees in 1988 and since 1996 has been named Redcar and Cleveland.

=== County and riding ===
The village's historic county is Yorkshire, in its North Riding. The North Riding County Council was established in 1889 and abolished in 1974.

=== Constituency ===
Marske is part of Redcar constituency and is represented in the House of Commons by Labour (Co-op) MP Anna Turley.

== Economy ==
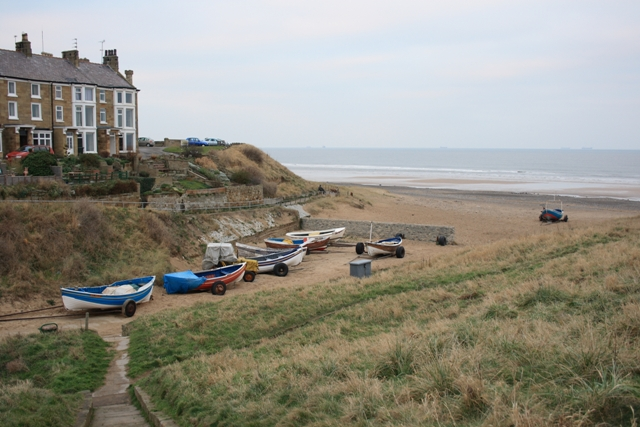
The Harbour at Marske

The majority of the residents of Marske do not work within the village, but work in nearby industry or in Middlesbrough or Redcar. Marske has a range of local shops and a mixture of light industries on the Industrial Estate notably label and barcode specialists Weyfringe. There is also small scale sea fishing using cobles and tractors from the beach.

== Landmarks ==
Marske has two imposing mansion houses:

- Marske Hall^{*} was built around 1625 and was formerly the home of the Zetland family. It was gifted to Leonard Cheshire to be run as a home for the disabled in 1964 and continued as such for the following 55 years, until it was sold as a going concern to a private company in 2019.
- Cliff House,^{*} which stands on the cliff tops overlooking the beach, was built in the 19th century as a holiday residence for the Pease family, who were prominent in the north-east business community, at the time, and principal shareholders in the Stockton and Darlington Railway. The railway was extended to Redcar in the 1840s and to Marske and Saltburn in the 1860s.

Marske has its own post office, medical centre, leisure centre and a library.

The village has Methodist, Baptist, Church of England and Roman Catholic churches and five public houses: The Frigate, The Ship Inn,^{*} The Zetland, The Mermaid and The Clarendon. The tower of St Germain's church was allowed to remain close to the cliff edge as a prominent landmark for fishermen in the North Sea.

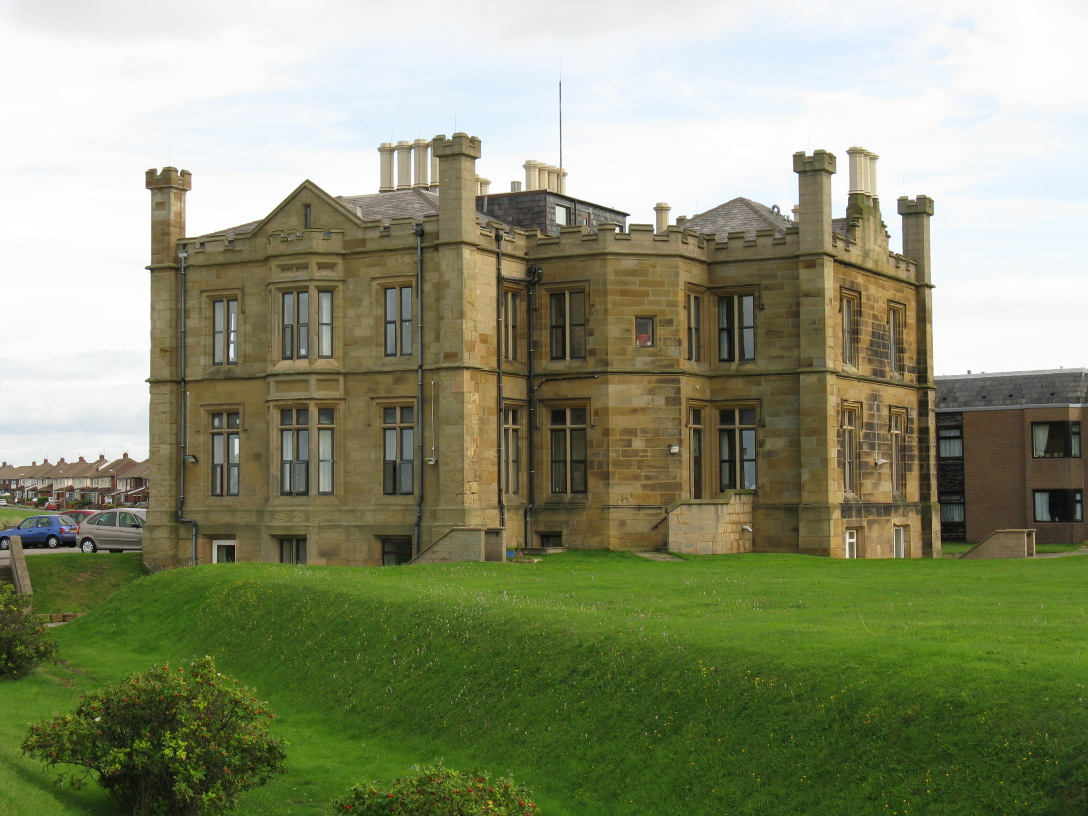
Cliff House^{*}

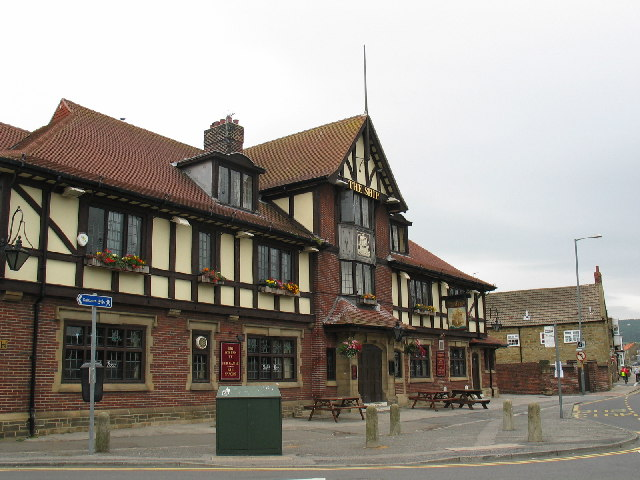
The Ship Inn^{*}

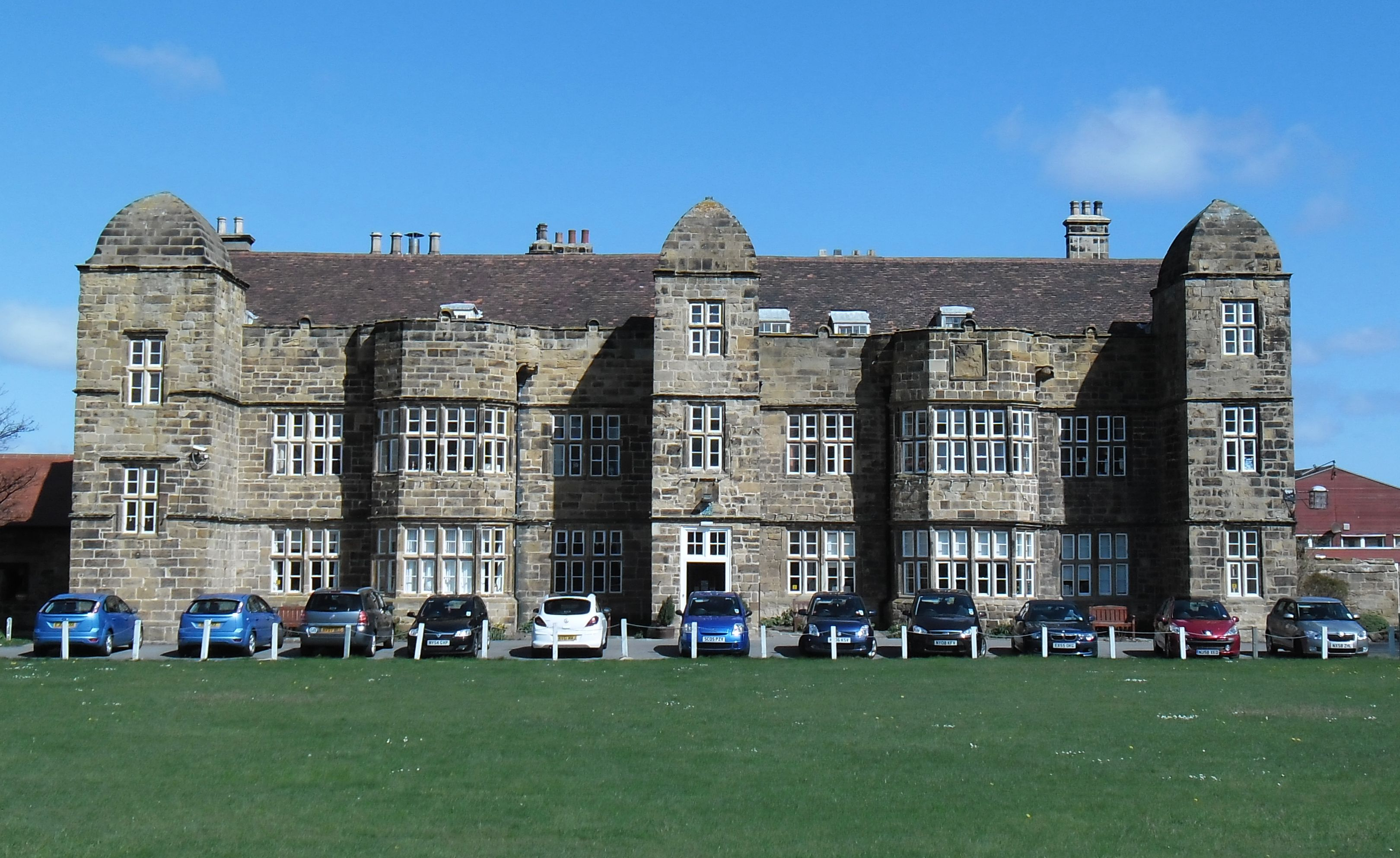
Grade I listed Marske Hall^{*}
^{*}listed building

Most of Marske's listed buildings are to be found on High Street, and Redcar Road, but there are a few more on Church Street, Cliff Terrace, East Street, and The Garth.

=== Winkies Castle ===
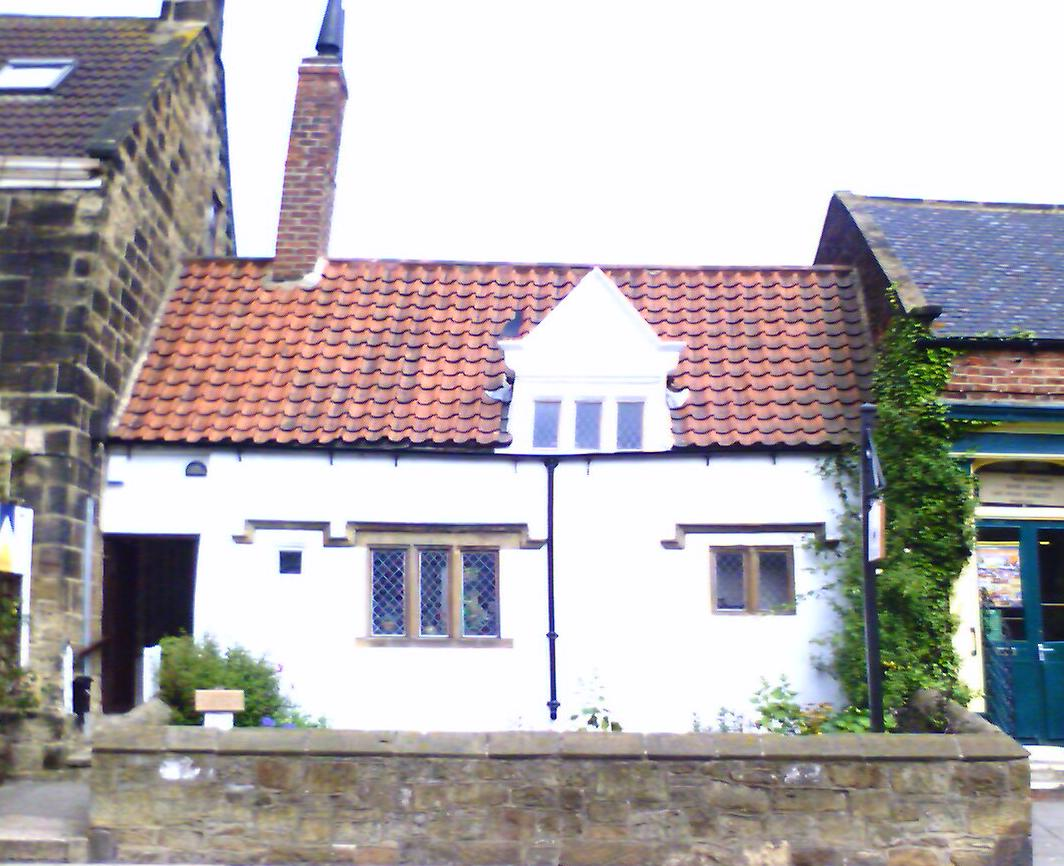
Winkies Castle

The village has a museum named Winkies Castle, dating back to the 17th century, which is run by volunteers and open to visitors from Easter Saturday each year until the end of September. This is not really a castle but an old half cruck cottage formerly owned by the late master shoemaker, Jack Anderson. There is a story that the house's name comes from Jack's cat named Winkie. The museum puts on rotating exhibitions and has over 6,000 items, including a two-headed lamb called "Bill and Ben".

The building was saved from demolition in 1968 by Jack Anderson when he turned it into a community museum and bequeathed it to the Community of Marske (trustees Redcar and Cleveland Borough Council).It is now run and managed by volunteers and is open three days a week from Easter Saturday until the end of September each year.

== Access ==
Marske is served by Longbeck and Marske railway stations, which connect to Darlington railway station. The main road through Marske is the A1085 Coast Road and High Street, and Marske is linked with Saltburn-by-the-Sea by a two mile cliff top trail.

Marske is served by the Arriva North East 28, 3/MC4, X2/X3 and X4/X4A bus services.

== Education ==
Marske-by-the-Sea has three primary schools: Errington Primary School, Westgarth Primary School, and St Bede's R.C. Primary School. Marske is served by the following secondary schools: Outwood Academy Bydales located within the village and Rye Hills Academy, Sacred Heart Catholic Secondary located in Redcar, and Huntcliff School located in Saltburn.

== Sport ==
Marske-by-the-Sea has a Martial Art ITF Tae Kwon Do School. Furthermore, the village has two Football teams; Northern League Division 1 football club Champions, Marske United F.C. and Langbaurgh League Division 2 Champions, Marske F.C., as well as a cricket club, and badminton club.

== Notable people ==
- England and Yorkshire cricketer Paul Jarvis grew up in Marske. His Yorkshire cc jumper can be found on display in Marske cricket club.
- Charles Dickens visited Marske in around 1844 to see the grave of Captain Cook's father. An early 20th century memorial, 20–30 yards west of St Germain's tower, marks the approximate location.
- 'Captain' W. E. Johns, the author of the Biggles books, was based at RFC Marske towards the end of the First World War.
- Charlotte Hughes, who was the longest-lived person ever documented in the United Kingdom from 1992 to 2025, lived in Marske.
- In the 1970s West Indies cricketer Albert Padmore lived in Marske.
- Middlesbrough Football Club players, Robbie Stockdale and Cameron Park both grew up in Marske.
- Singer and songwriter Georgina Anderson, who died from cancer in 2013 at the age of 15, came from Marske and attended Bydales Secondary School.
- Actor-playwright, singer-songwriter Shaun Lawton, was born in New Marske in 1941.
- Enid Scudamore-Stanhope, Countess of Chesterfield (10 September 1878 – 30 November 1957), heiress and racehorse breeder, was born at Marske Hall.
- Singer and comedian Paul Vickers grew up in Marske.
