= Saltburn-by-the-Sea =

Town in North Yorkshire, England

Coordinates: 54.5828°N 0.9732°W

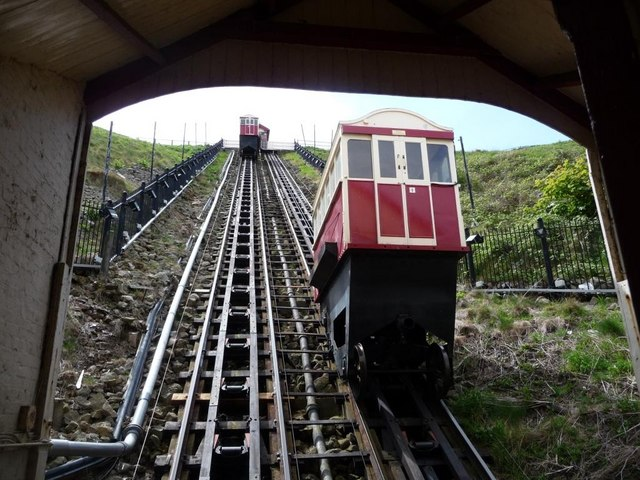
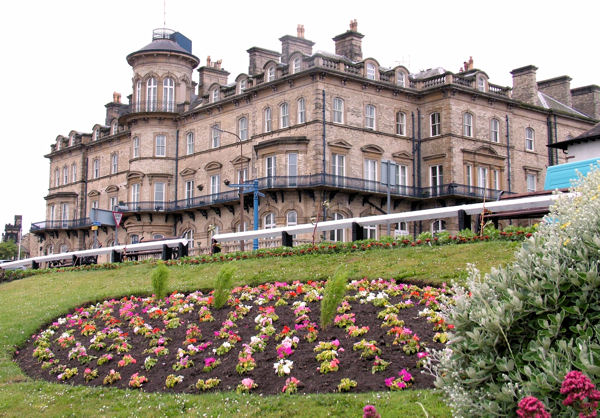
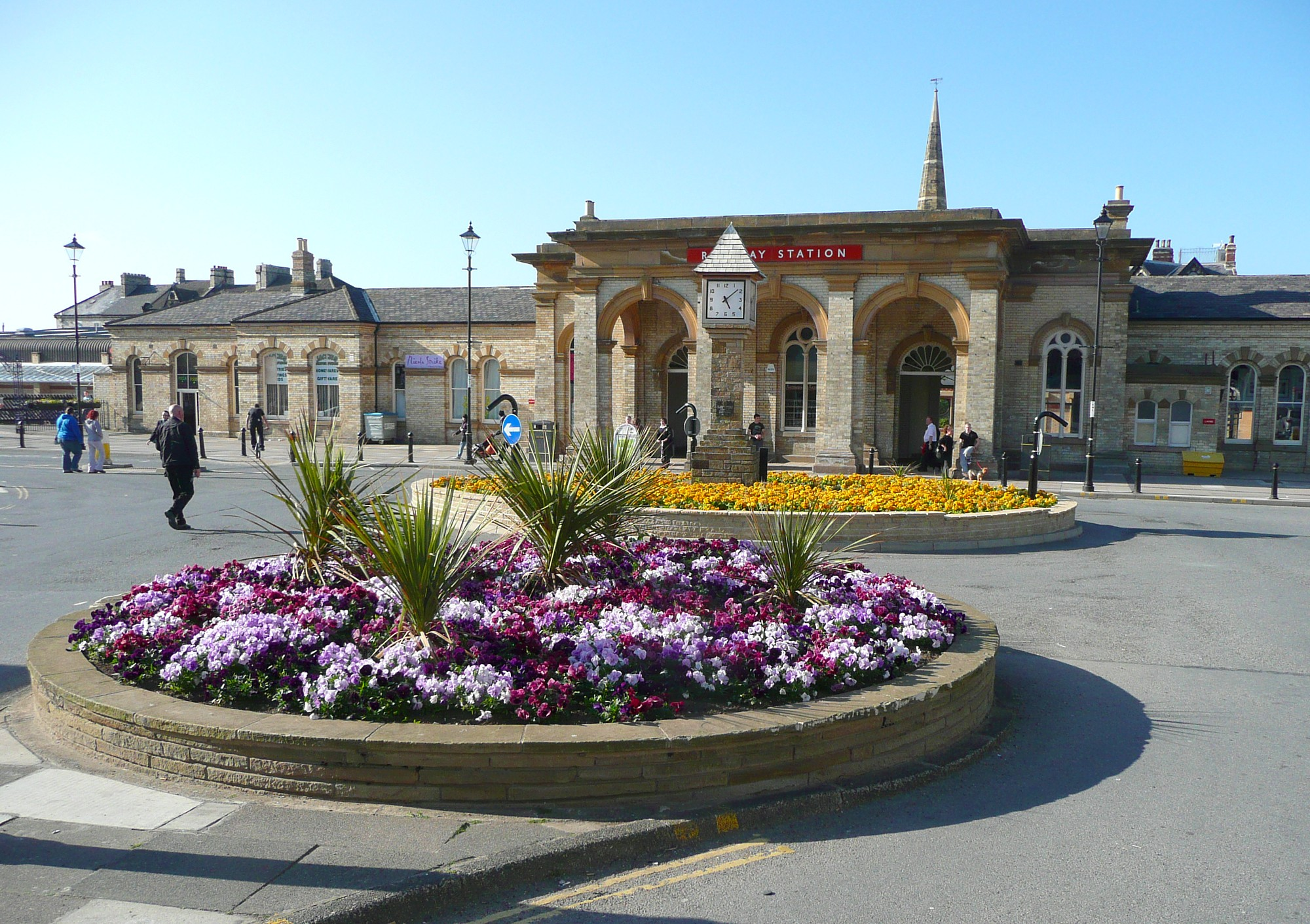
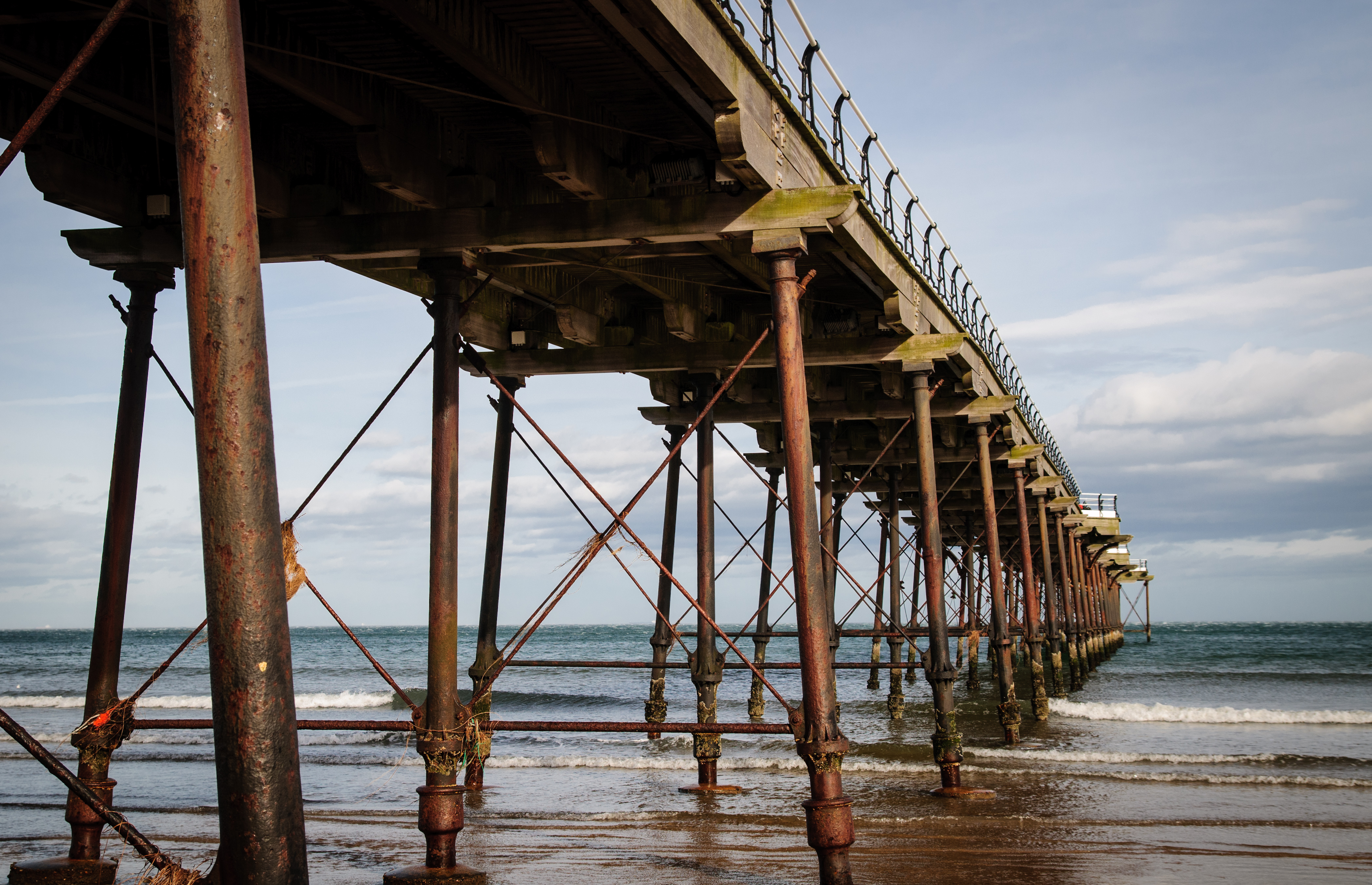
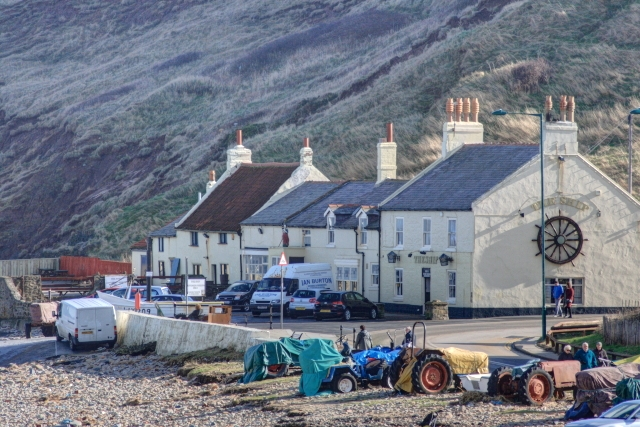
- Left to right: top: The Funicular and Zetland Hotel; middle: The town centre and the station; bottom: Saltburn Pier and The Ship

- Location within North Yorkshire
- Population: 5,958 (2011 Census ward)
- OS grid reference: NZ663213
  - London: 263.1 miles (423.4 km)
- Civil parish: Saltburn, Marske and New Marske
- Unitary authority: Redcar and Cleveland
- Ceremonial county: North Yorkshire
- Region: North East
- Country: England
- Sovereign state: United Kingdom
- Post town: SALTBURN-BY-THE-SEA
- Postcode district: TS12
- Dialling code: 01287
- Police: Cleveland
- Fire: Cleveland
- Ambulance: North East
- UK Parliament: Redcar

Saltburn-by-the-Sea, commonly referred to as Saltburn, is a seaside town in the civil parish of Saltburn, Marske and New Marske, in the Redcar and Cleveland unitary authority, North Yorkshire, England. It lies 12 miles (19 km) south-east of Hartlepool and 5 miles (8 km) south-east of Redcar, within the historic boundaries of the North Riding of Yorkshire and on the Cleveland Way long distance footpath.

The development of Saltburn was driven by the discovery of ironstone in the Cleveland Hills and building of railways to transport the minerals.

== History ==
Saltburn was formerly in the parish of Brotton; however, after 1894, it became a separate civil parish, formed from the part of Marske parish in the newly-formed Saltburn-by-the-Sea Urban District.

On 1 April 1932, the urban district was abolished to form Saltburn and Marske By the Sea Urban District. The original civil parish was also abolished on 1 April 1974 to form Saltburn and Marske by the Sea.

In 1992, Steven Clark, a 23‑year‑old man from nearby Marske, disappeared after being last seen at the public toilets near Saltburn Pier. His case remains unsolved.

=== Old Saltburn ===
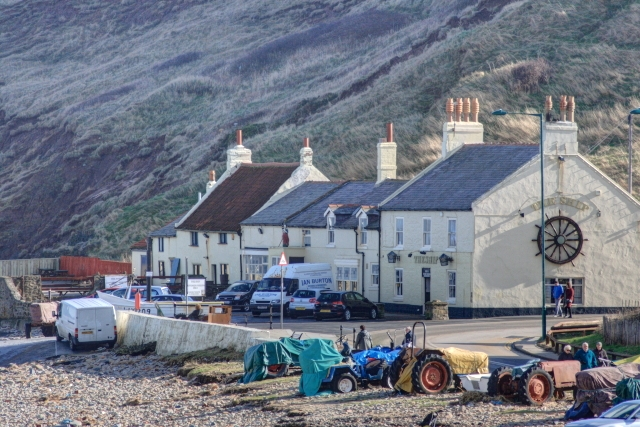
Old Saltburn

The town's name derives from the Old English saltburna, meaning 'salt stream'.

Old Saltburn is the original settlement, located in the Saltburn Gill. Records are scarce on its origins, but it was a centre for smugglers and publican John Andrew is referred to as 'king of smugglers'.

In 1856, the hamlet consisted of the Ship Inn and a row of houses, occupied by farmers and fishermen. In the mid-18th century, authors Laurence Sterne and John Hall-Stevenson enjoyed racing chariots on the sands at Saltburn.

=== Victorian era ===
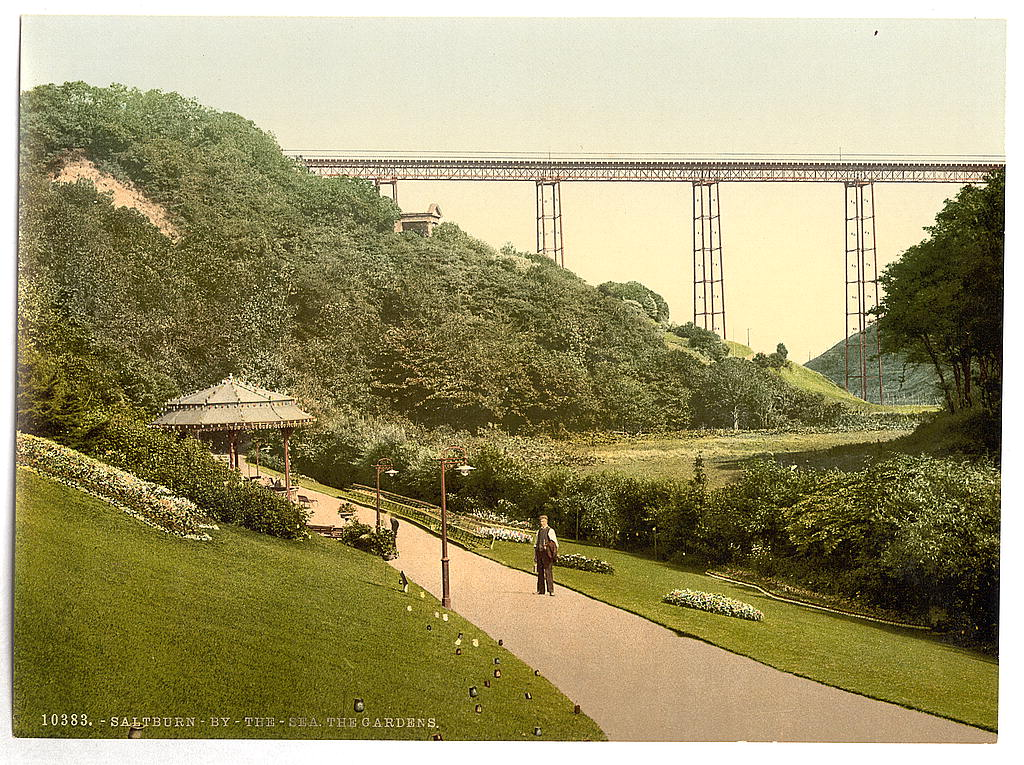
Saltburn-by-the-Sea, the gardens, c. 1890–1900

The Pease family of Darlington developed Middlesbrough as an industrial centre and, after discovery of iron stone, the Stockton & Darlington Railway and the West Hartlepool Harbour and Railway Company developed routes into East Cleveland. By 1861, the S&DR reached Saltburn with the intention of continuing to Brotton, Skinningrove and Loftus; however, the WHH&RCo had already developed tracks in the area, leaving little point in extending the S&DR tracks further.

In 1858, while walking along the coast path towards Old Saltburn to visit his brother Joseph in Marske-by-the-Sea, Henry Pease saw "a prophetic vision of a town arising on the cliff and the quiet, unfrequented and sheltered glen turned into a lovely garden."

The Pease family owned Middlesbrough Estate and had control of the S&DR; they agreed to develop Henry's vision by forming the Saltburn Improvement Company (SIC). Land was purchased from the Earl of Zetland and the company commissioned surveyor George Dickinson to lay out what became an interpretation of a gridiron street layout, although this was interrupted by the railway which ran through the site. With as many houses as possible having sea views, the so-called "Jewel streets" along the seafront—Coral, Garnet, Ruby, Emerald, Pearl, Diamond and Amber Streets, said to be a legacy of Henry's vision, were additional to the grid pattern.

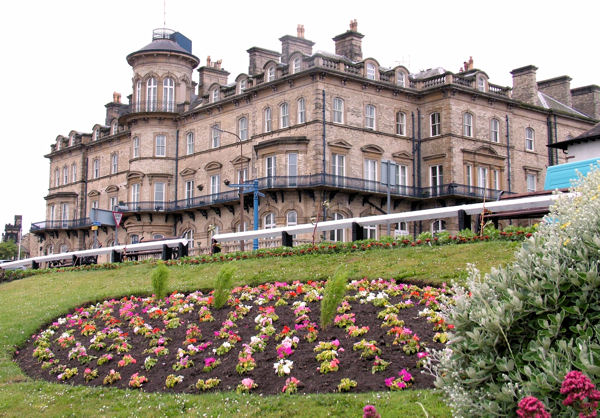
The Zetland, now an apartment building, formerly the historic Zetland Hotel

After securing the best positions for development by the SIC, money was raised for construction by selling plots to private developers and investors. Most buildings are constructed using Pease brick, transported from Darlington by the S&DR, with the name Pease set into the brick. The jewel in Henry Pease's crown is said to have been the Zetland Hotel with a private platform, one of the world's earliest railway hotels.

The parcel of land known as Clifton Villas was sold by the SIC in 1865 to William Morley from London, who built the property, The Cottage (now Teddy's Nook) on a site originally intended for three villas. The SIC stipulated in the deed of covenant that "any trees planted along Britannia Terrace (now Marine Parade) were not to exceed 1' 6" above the footpath" (46 cm) to preserve sea views for Britannia Terrace residents and visitors.

The Redcar to Saltburn Railway opened in 1861, as an extension of the Middlesbrough to Redcar Railway of 1846. The line was extended to Whitby as part of the Whitby Redcar and Middlesbrough Union Railway.

== Geography ==
The coastline at Saltburn lies practically east–west and along much of it runs Marine Parade. To the east of the town is the imposing Hunt Cliff, topped by Warsett Hill at 166 metres (545 ft). Skelton Beck runs through the wooded Valley Gardens in Saltburn, then alongside Saltburn Miniature Railway before being joined by Saltburn Gill going under the A174 road bridge and entering the North Sea across the sandy beach. The A174 road number is now used for the Skelton/Brotton by-pass.

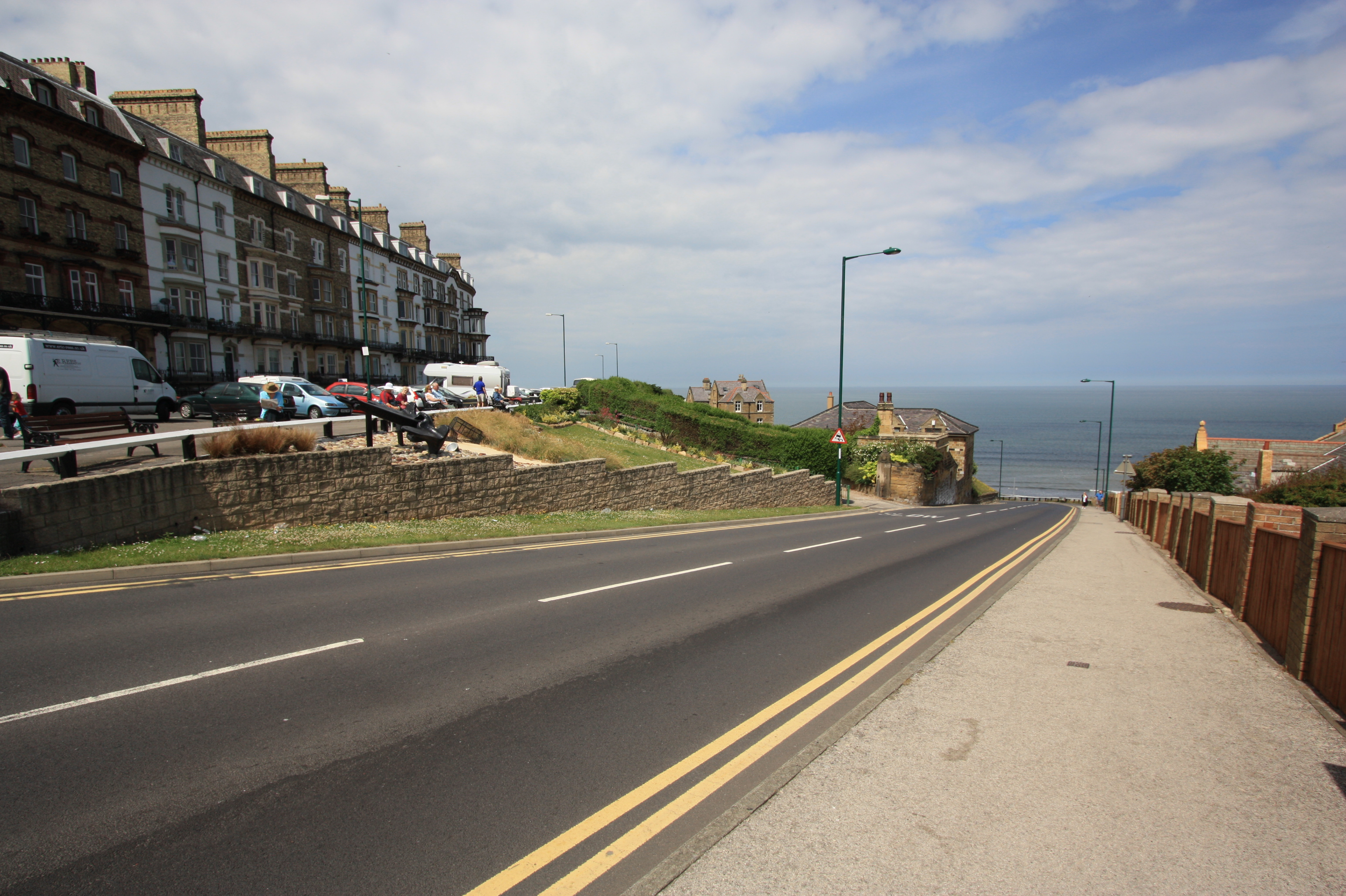
Road down the bank

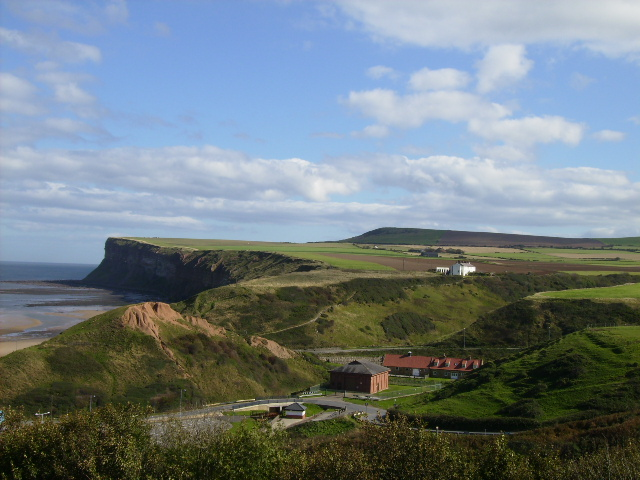
Cat Nab (left foreground) and Hunt Cliff

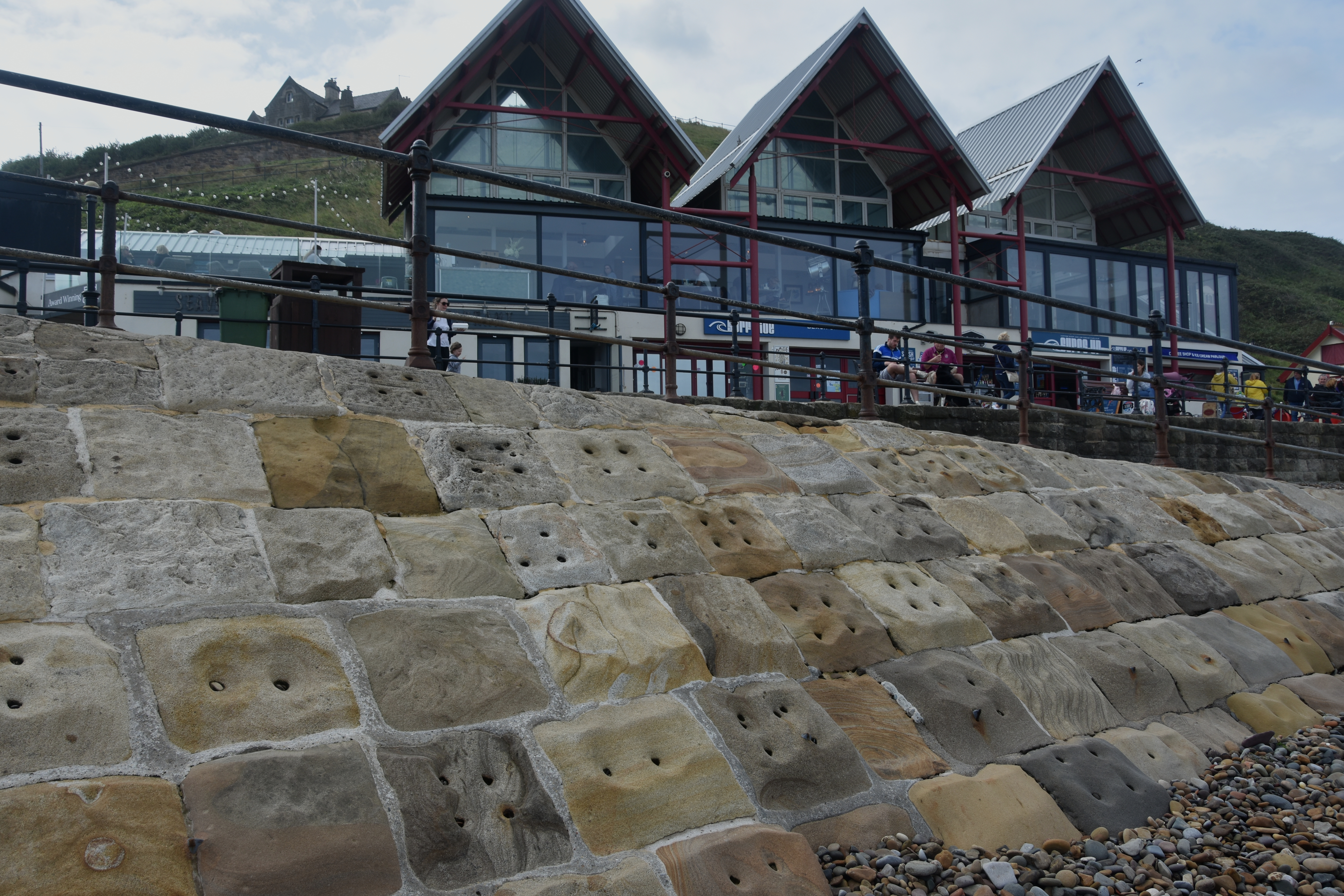
Esplanade and sea wall

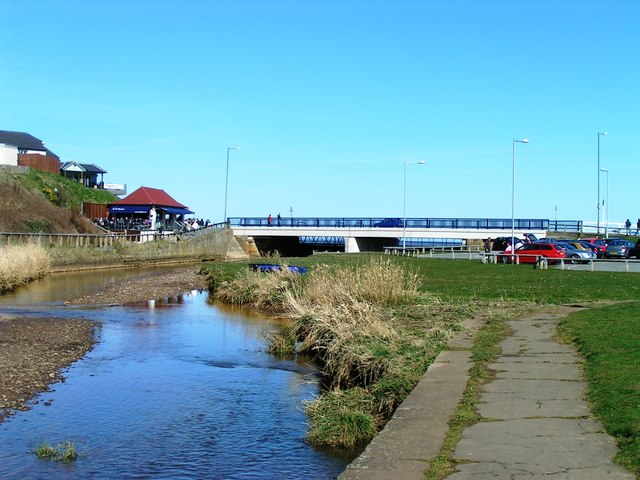
Skelton Beck and Saltburn Bridge

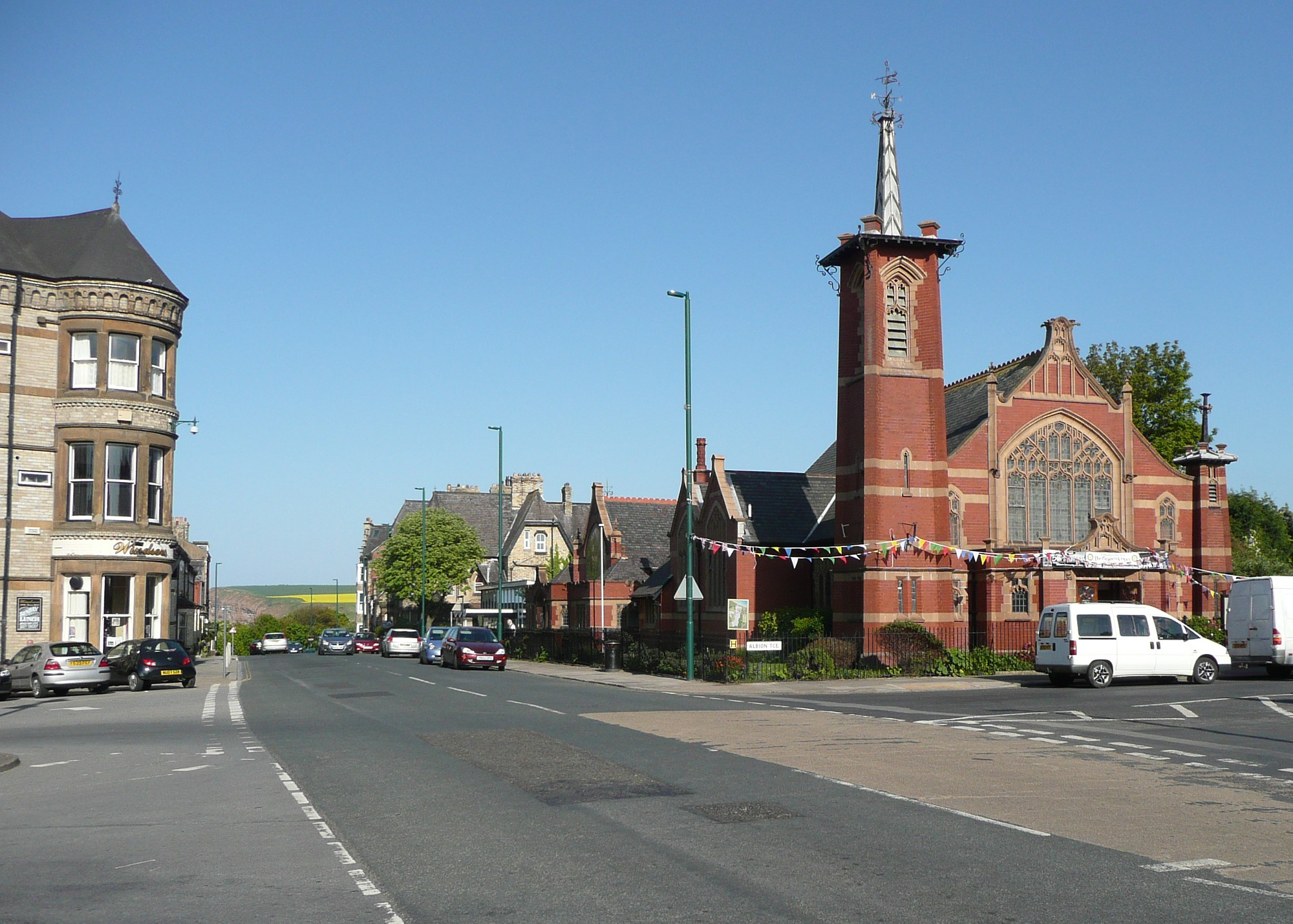
The community theatre on the right

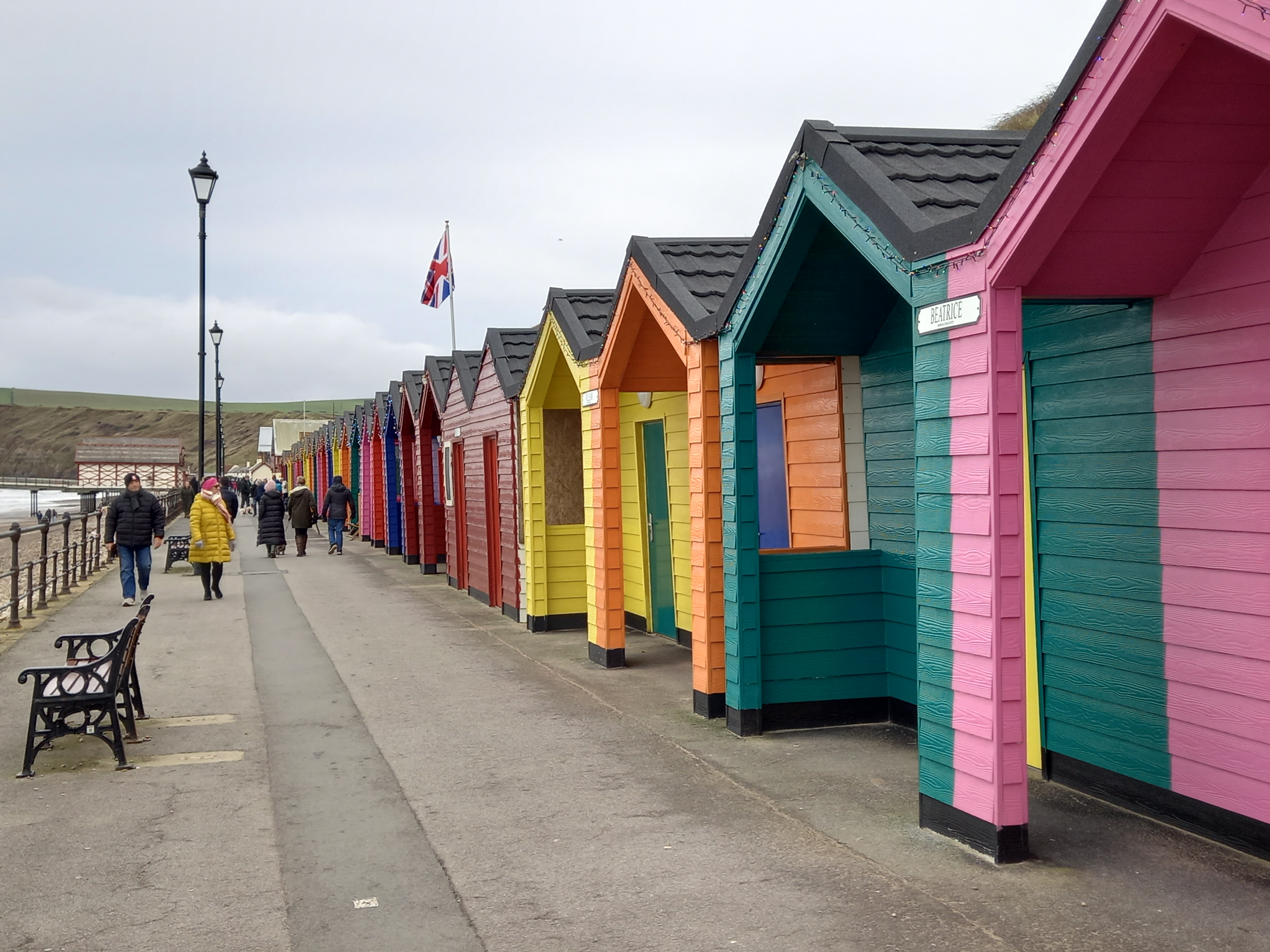
Beach Huts

== Demographics ==
In 1961, the parish had a population of 5,708. The ward itself had a population of 5,958 in 2011.

== Landmarks ==
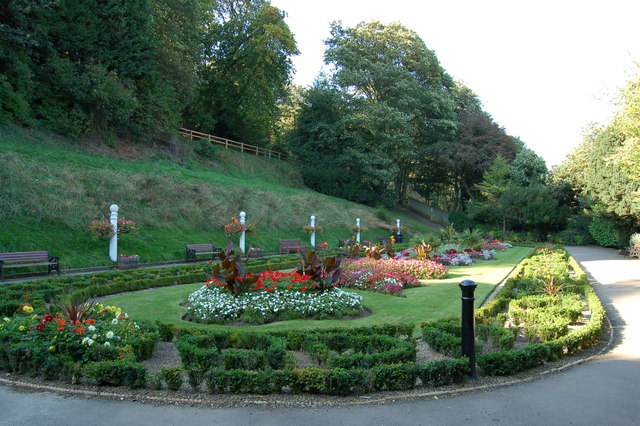
The Italian Gardens

A forest walk in the Valley Gardens gives access to the Italian Gardens and leads on to the railway viaduct. On the shore of Old Saltburn stands the Ship Inn, which dates to the 17th century.

In the town, there are plenty of Victorian buildings; there is also a thriving local theatre, The 53 Society, and a public library.

=== Cliff lift ===
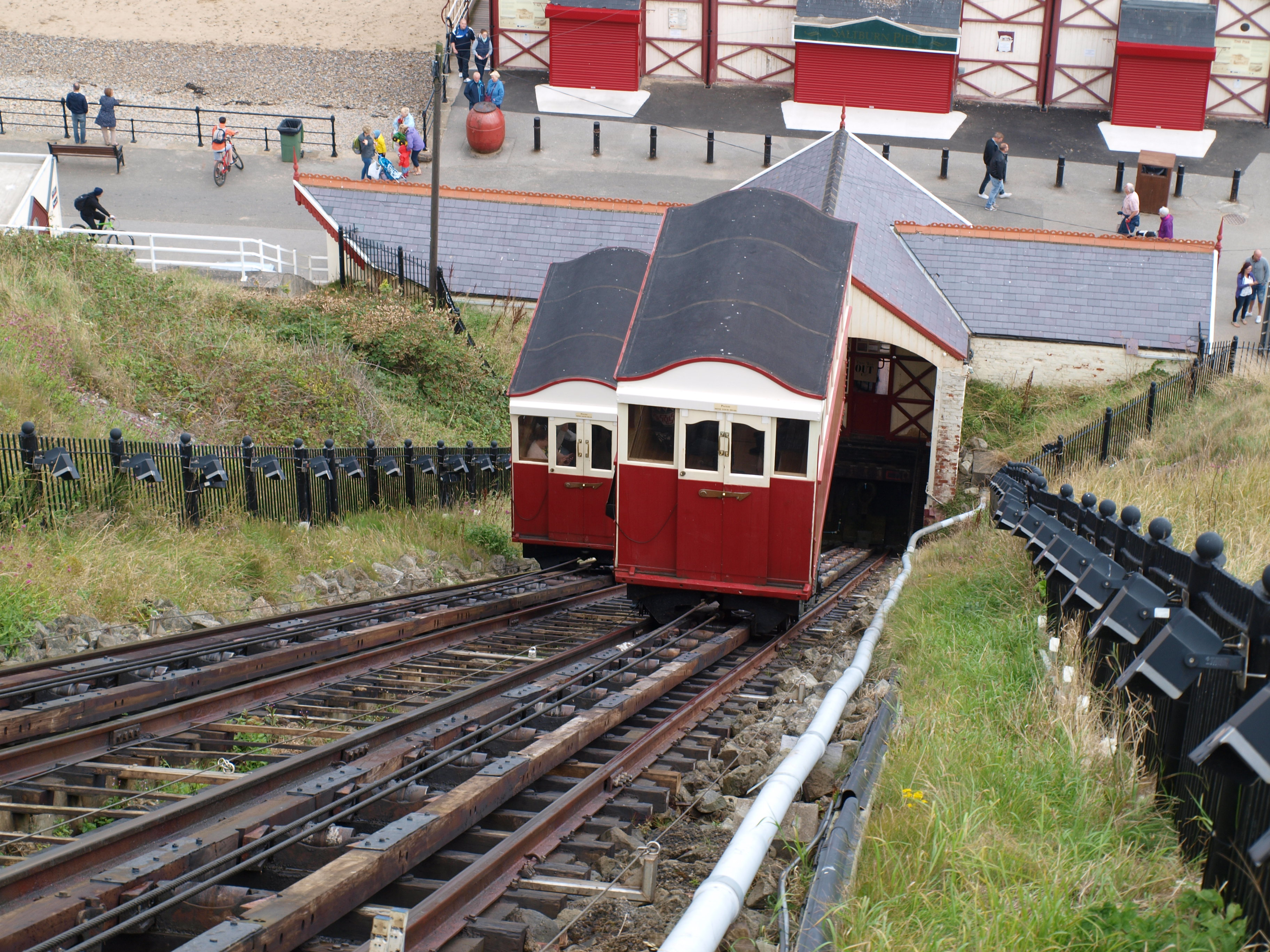
Saltburn Cliff Lift

The Saltburn Cliff Lift is one of the world's oldest water-powered funiculars; the oldest is the Bom Jesus funicular in Braga, Portugal.

After the opening of Saltburn Pier in February 1869, it was concluded that the steep cliff walk was deterring people from walking from the town to the pier. After the company was taken over by Middlesbrough Estates in 1883, it was discovered that the wooden cliff hoist had a number of rotten supports.

The Saltburn Tramway, as it is also known, was developed by Sir Richard Tangye's company, whose chief engineer was George Croydon Marks. The cliff tramway opened a year later and provided transport between the pier and the town. The railway is water-balanced and the water pump has been electrically operated since 1924. The first major maintenance was carried out in 1998, when the main winding wheel was replaced and a new braking system was installed.

=== Pier ===
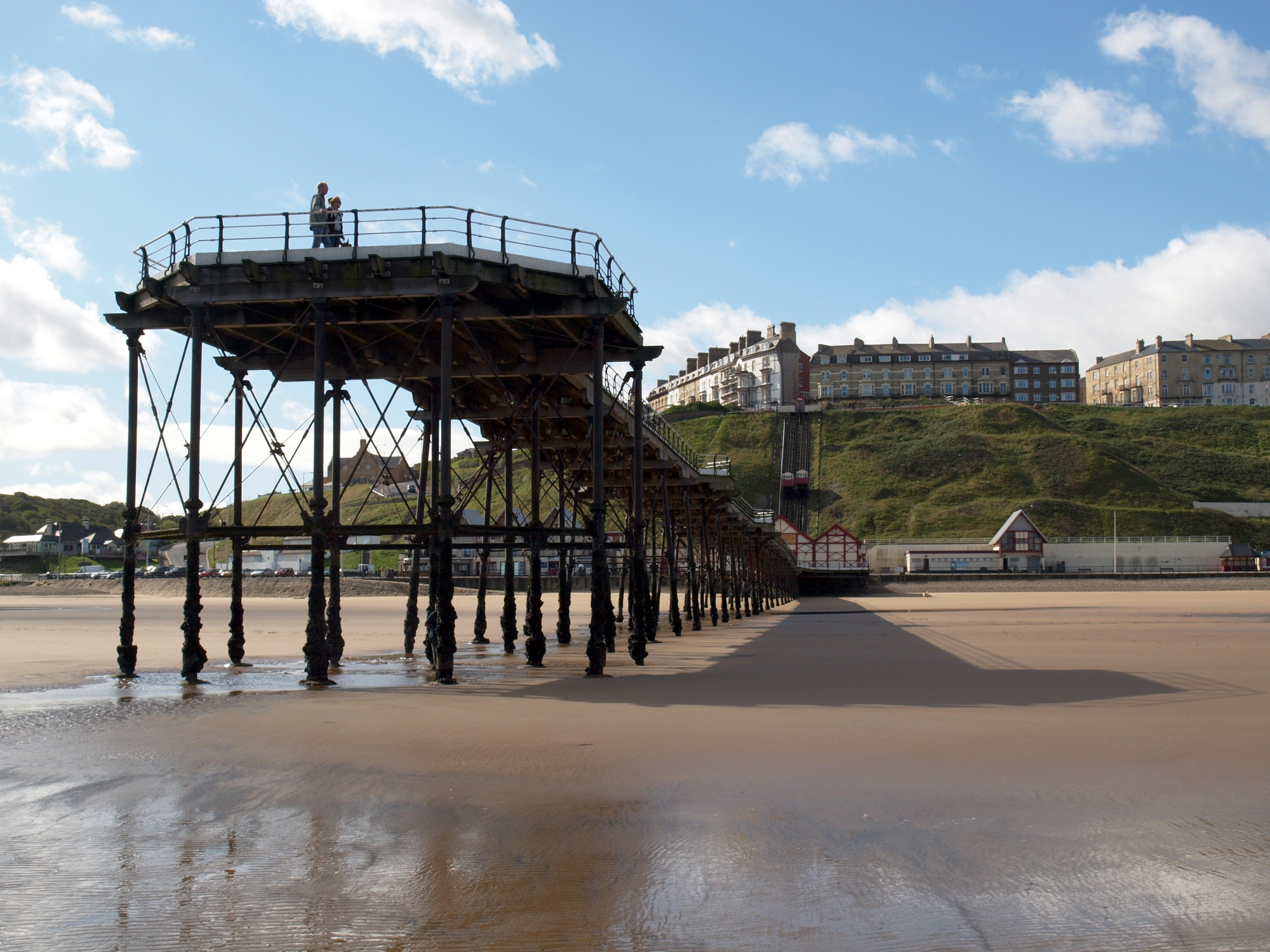
Saltburn Pier

Saltburn's attractions include a Grade II* listed renovated pier, the only pleasure pier in the North East and Yorkshire coast.

=== Miniature railway ===
The Saltburn Miniature Railway is a 15 in (381 mm) gauge railway that runs south from Cat Nab station, close to the beach, for about ½ mile inland to Forest Halt; here, there is a woodland walk and the Italian Gardens.

=== Public houses ===
As the town had been founded by Quakers, the Saltburn Improvement Company had a ban on public houses. Alcohol was served in the hotels and the bars attached to them, and in private members' clubs; these included: Ruby Street Social Club (formerly The British Legion; now demolished), Lune Street Social Club (Top Club), Milton Street Social Club (Bottom Club), The Red Lodge, The Conservative Club, Saltburn Golf Club, Saltburn Cricket, Tennis and Bowls Club, and The Queens (known locally as "The Swingdoors").

Saltburn's first public house (independent of an existing hotel) was The Victoria, opened on 8 December 1982.

Today, the following are public houses in Saltburn: Alexandra Vaults (known locally as "Back Alex"), The Victoria, The Marine, The Ship Inn, Vista Mar and The Hop and Vine (formerly Windsor's).

=== Teddy's Nook (The Cottage) ===
Teddy's Nook is a house built in 1862 by Henry Pease, a director of the Stockton and Darlington Railway, for his own occupation. Pease was responsible for the foundation of the seaside resort and the sturdy sandstone house was first named The Cottage.

Lillie Langtry, The Jersey Lily, stayed at the house at sometime between 1877 and 1880. She was visited often by Edward Prince of Wales (later Edward VII), who had a suite of rooms at the Zetland Hotel. The cottage, consequently, became known as Teddy's Nook.

The cottage was only one of four similar houses to be called Clifton Villas. It was the family home of Audrey Collins MBE, who served as Mayor of Saltburn and chair of the South Tees Health Authority. Middlesbrough's James Cook University Hospital named a teaching unit in her name.

=== Saltburn Valley Woods ===
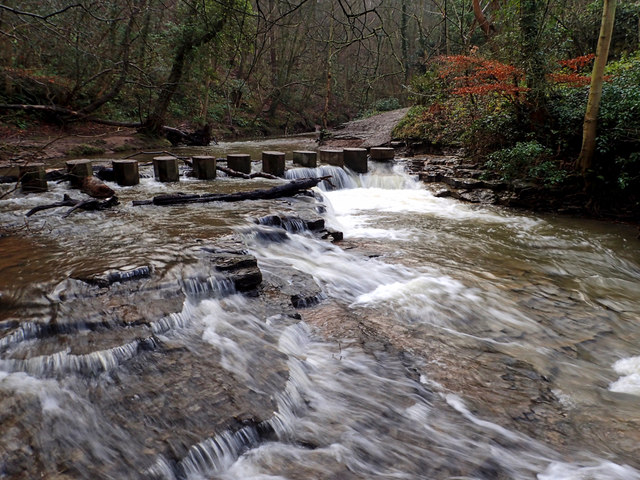
Stepping stones, Skelton Beck

Locally known as "Fairy Glen", the Saltburn Valley Woods run through Saltburn Beck; places include the Stepping Stones and the Saltburn Viaduct.

== Education ==
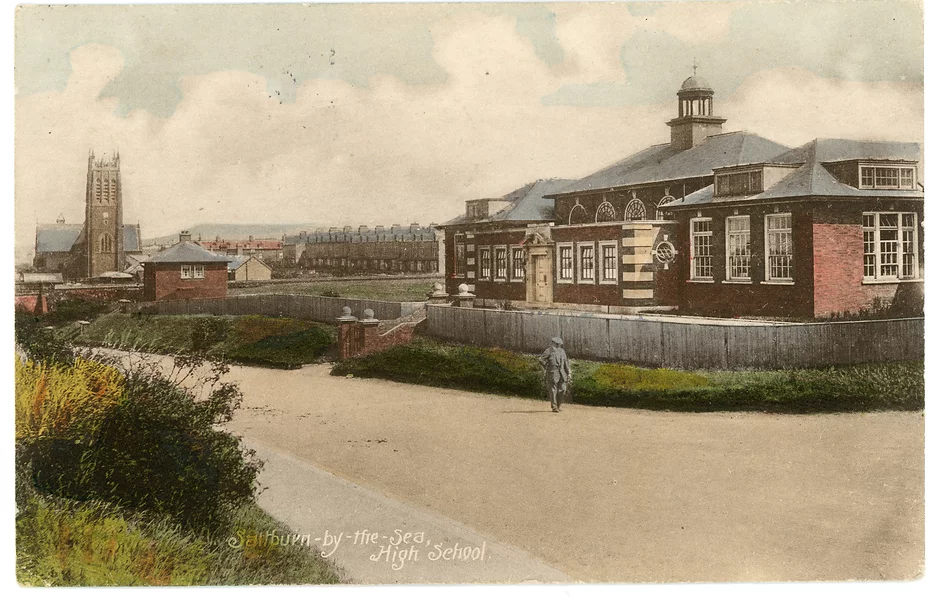
The former girls' grammar school; now the Earthbeat Centre

Saltburn's only secondary school is Huntcliff School, which was rebuilt during 2007–8. The redundant 50 year-old school buildings were then demolished to allow the town's junior and infant schools to relocate to the same site in 2009.

In the early 1900s, the building where the Earthbeat Centre is now located was a girls' grammar school, and later a primary school until 2009. "After many months of intensive renovation the former Saltburn School has now opened its doors to the public as the Earthbeat Centre." The site is now the home of the Earthbeat Centre, with a 50-year lease that began in 2015.

== Transport ==
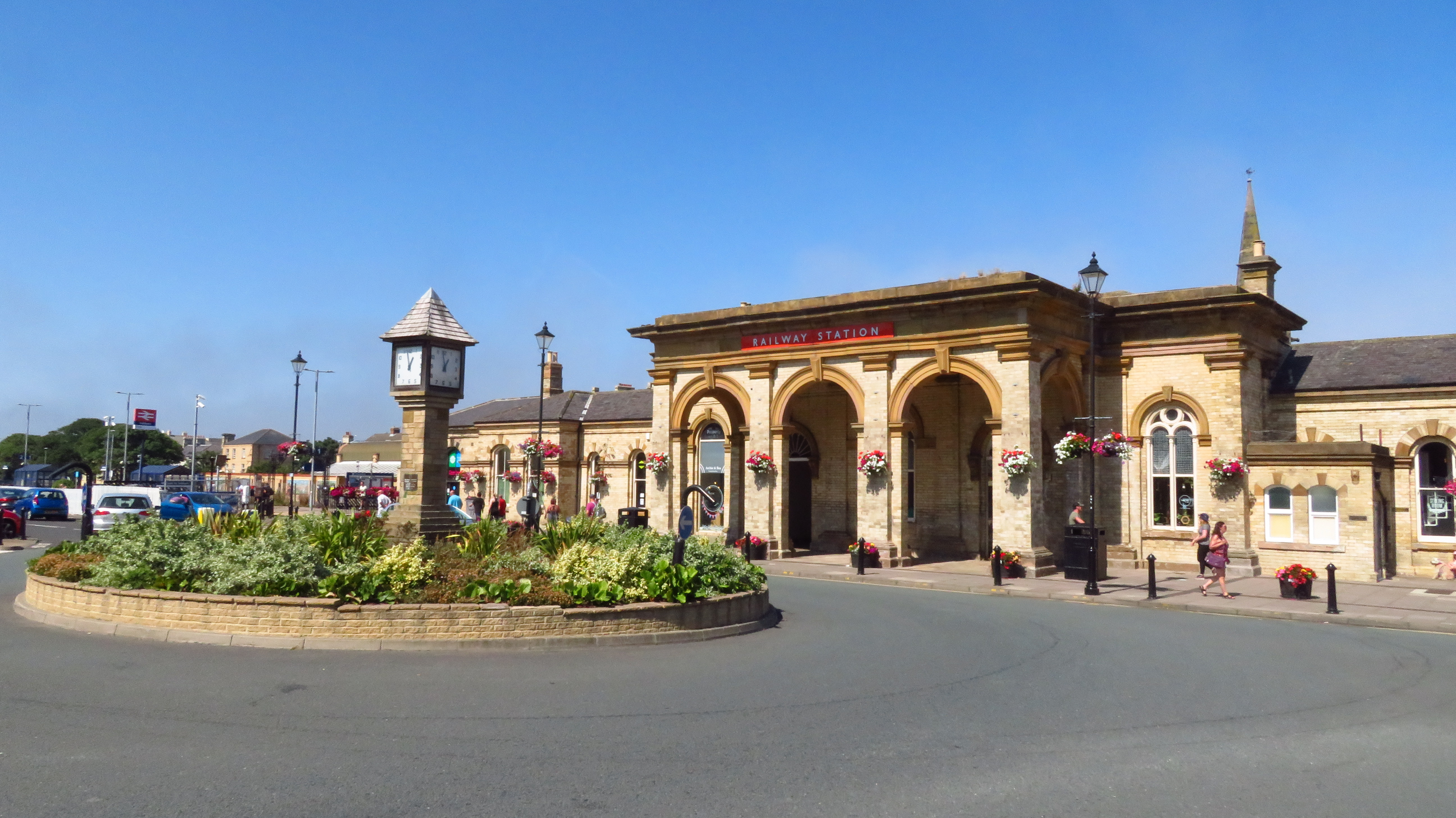
Saltburn railway station

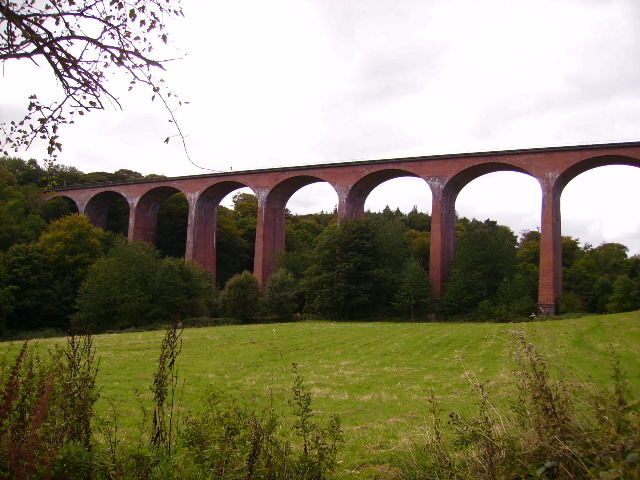
Saltburn Viaduct

Saltburn railway station is the eastern terminus of the Tees Valley Line. Northern Trains generally operates two trains per hour to Middlesbrough and Darlington, with hourly extensions to Bishop Auckland.

Beyond Saltburn, a mineral goods line continues across Saltburn Viaduct and the edge of Hunt Cliff to the potash mine at nearby Boulby.

Arriva North East and Stagecoach North East provide bus services in the area; routes connect the town with Ryelands Park, Redcar, Middlesbrough, Loftus and Whitby.

== Sport ==
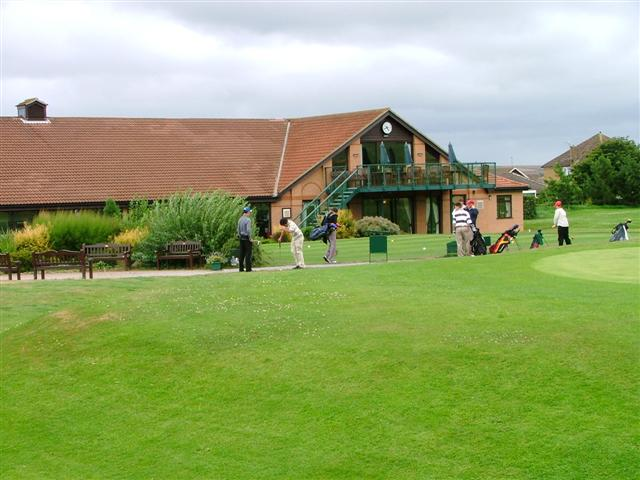
Saltburn Golf Club

Sports played in Saltburn include cricket and bowls; tennis also played at the club in Marske Mill Lane, which has existed for over a century and is nearly as old as the town itself. New facilities were provided in 2002, with financial help from the National Lottery.

The Saltburn Cricket Club play in the NYSD league. In July 2026, a fielding Saltburn player was suspended after allegedly clicking his fingers to emulate the sound of a ball clipping a bat to get the batter out in a second XI Division 2 match - in an incident viewed over 7.5 million times online.

The North Riding Duck Race is held each year on 1 August to celebrate Yorkshire Day. The winner receives the Colin Holt Cup, named in honour of the late chairman of the Yorkshire Ridings Society; a prize is given also for the duck with the most original name.

The coastline is known for national surfing events held during the autumn and winter months, attracting competitors from across Great Britain.

== Culture and events ==
Annual events include the Saltburn Custom Classic Car Show, a lower prom display of mostly American cars, and the Saltburn Festival of Folk Music, Dance and Song. A farmers' market is held on the second Saturday of each month.

== Notable people ==
- Grandson of the naturalist Charles Darwin, Erasmus Darwin IV lived in Albion Terrace (1911 census). He served in the First World War and was killed in 1915. He is commemorated on Saltburn War Memorial.
- Speed record breaker Sir Malcolm Campbell set his first speed record (138.08 mph, unofficial) while driving Blue Bird on Saltburn Sands on 17 June 1922.
- Deep Purple and Whitesnake lead vocalist David Coverdale grew up in the Red Lodge on Marine Parade, now known as Red Gables.
- Astronaut Nicholas Patrick was born in Saltburn.
- Professional footballers and managers George Hardwick, Tony Mowbray and Graeme Murty were all born in Saltburn.
- Astrophysicist Carole Ann Haswell, discoverer of several exoplanets, was born in Saltburn.

== See also ==
- Sandsend
- Scarborough, North Yorkshire
- Seaham
- Seaton Carew
- Staithes
