= Longbeck railway station =

Railway station in North Yorkshire, England

Longbeck
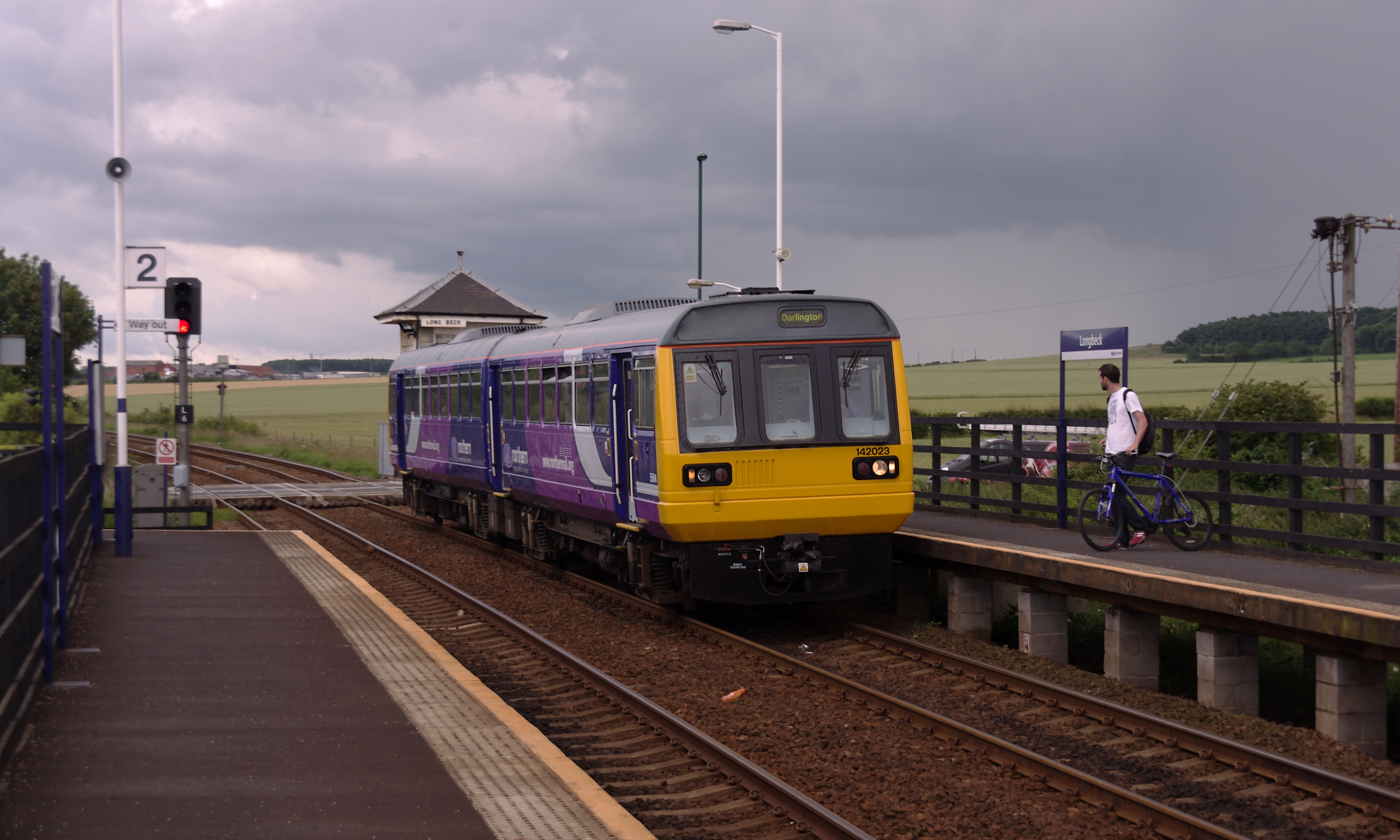

General information
- Location: Marske-by-the-Sea, Redcar and Cleveland; England
- Coordinates: 54°35′22″N 1°01′52″W
- Grid reference: NZ627220
- Owner: Network Rail
- Manager: Northern Trains
- Platforms: 2
- Tracks: 2

Other information
- Station code: LGK
- Classification: DfT category F2

History
- Original company: British Rail (Regional Railways)

Key dates
- 13 May 1985: Opened

Passengers
- 2021/22: ▲40,116
- 2022/23: ▲43,938
- 2023/24: ▲53,094
- 2024/25: ▲58,346
- 2025/26: ▲66,416
Location
- Location within North Yorkshire
Notes
- Passenger statistics from the Office of Rail and Road

Longbeck is a railway station on the Tees Valley Line, which runs between Bishop Auckland and Saltburn via Darlington. The station, situated 10 miles 28 chains (16.7 km) east of Middlesbrough, serves the village of Marske-by-the-Sea, Redcar and Cleveland in North Yorkshire, England. It is owned by Network Rail and managed by Northern Trains.

== History ==
The station was opened in May 1985 by British Rail. The small signal box here supervises the junction and station area at nearby Saltburn and the freight line to Boulby as well as the adjacent level crossing.

=== Tees Valley Metro ===
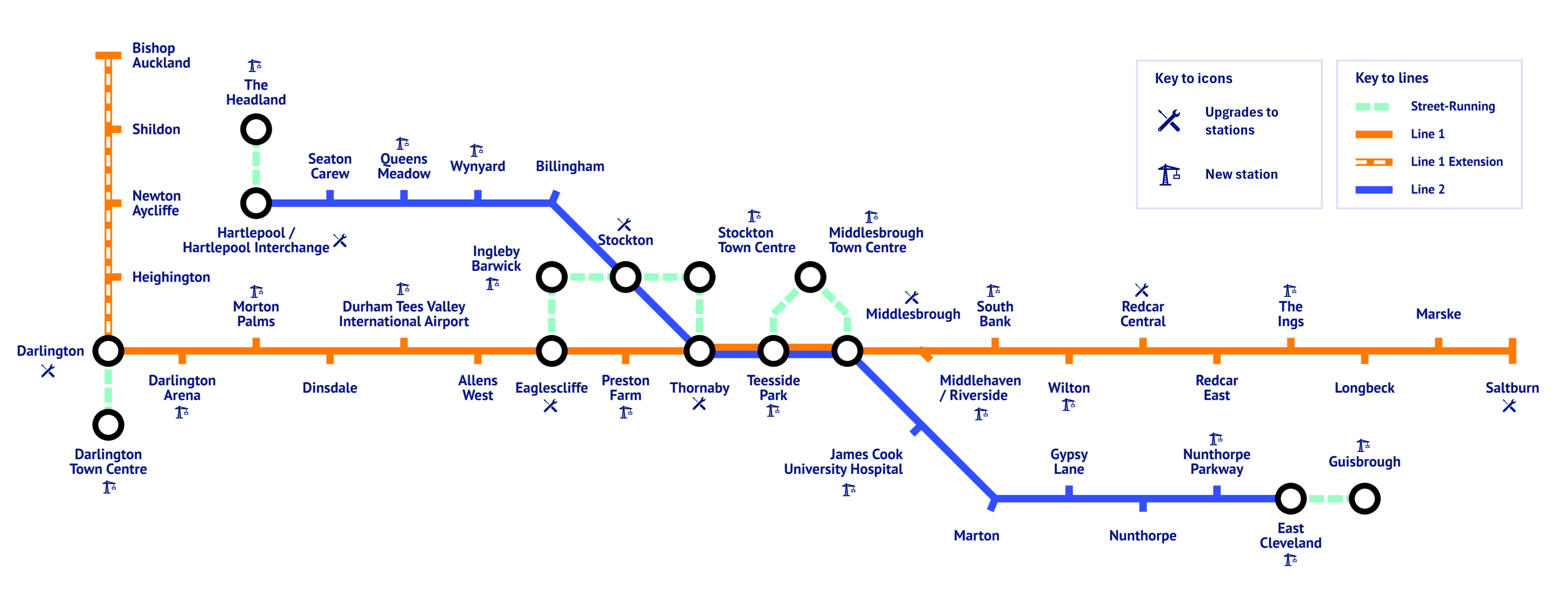
Transit diagram showcasing all discussed or mentioned ideas for the Tees Valley Metro.

Starting in 2006, Longbeck was mentioned within the Tees Valley Metro scheme. This was a plan to upgrade the Tees Valley Line and sections of the Esk Valley Line and Durham Coast Line to provide a faster and more frequent service across the North East of England. In the initial phases the services would have been heavy rail mostly along existing alignments with new additional infrastructure and rollingstock. The later phase would have introduced tram-trains to allow street running and further heavy rail extensions.

As part of the scheme, Longbeck station would have received improved service to Darlington (1–2 to 4 trains per hour) and new rollingstock.

However, due to a change in government in 2010 and the 2008 financial crisis, the project was ultimately shelved. Several stations eventually got their improvements and there is a possibility of improved rollingstock and services in the future which may affect Longbeck.

== Facilities ==
The station is unstaffed. A round of improvements made here in 2012 included new fully lit waiting shelters, renewed station signage and the installation of CCTV. Digital information screens have been installed, whilst the long-line Public Address system (PA) has been renewed and upgraded with pre-recorded train announcements; running information can also be obtained by telephone and timetable posters. Step-free access is available to both platforms.

== Services ==
As of the May 2021 timetable change, the station is served by two trains per hour between Saltburn and Darlington via Middlesbrough, with one train per hour extending to Bishop Auckland. An hourly service operates between Saltburn and Bishop Auckland on Sunday. All services are operated by Northern Trains.

Rolling stock used: Class 156 Super Sprinter and Class 158 Express Sprinter

Preceding station	National Rail	Following station
Marske	Northern Trains; Tees Valley Line	Redcar East
