= Saltburn Gill =

SSSI in Cleveland, England

- Location within North Yorkshire
- Location: Redcar and Cleveland, North Yorkshire, England
- Coordinates: 54°34′32″N 0°57′12″W
- Area: 19.11 ha (47.2 acres)
- Established: 1986
- Governing body: Natural England
- Website: Map of site

Saltburn Gill (grid reference NZ676205) is an 19.11 hectares (47.2 acres) biological Site of Special Scientific Interest in Redcar and Cleveland district, in the ceremonial county of North Yorkshire, England. The site was notified in 1986. The "gill" in the name is a dialectal word meaning "ravine, narrow valley".

In May 1999, the colour of the water in Saltburn Gill turned orange overnight. An investigation found the cause to be rising water levels in the abandoned Longacres Ironstone Mine in Skelton-in-Cleveland. A remediation programme was undertaken throughout the 2000s and 2010s, which resulted in clear water and fish returning to the gill in 2016.
