= Marske railway station =

Railway station in North Yorkshire, England

Marske
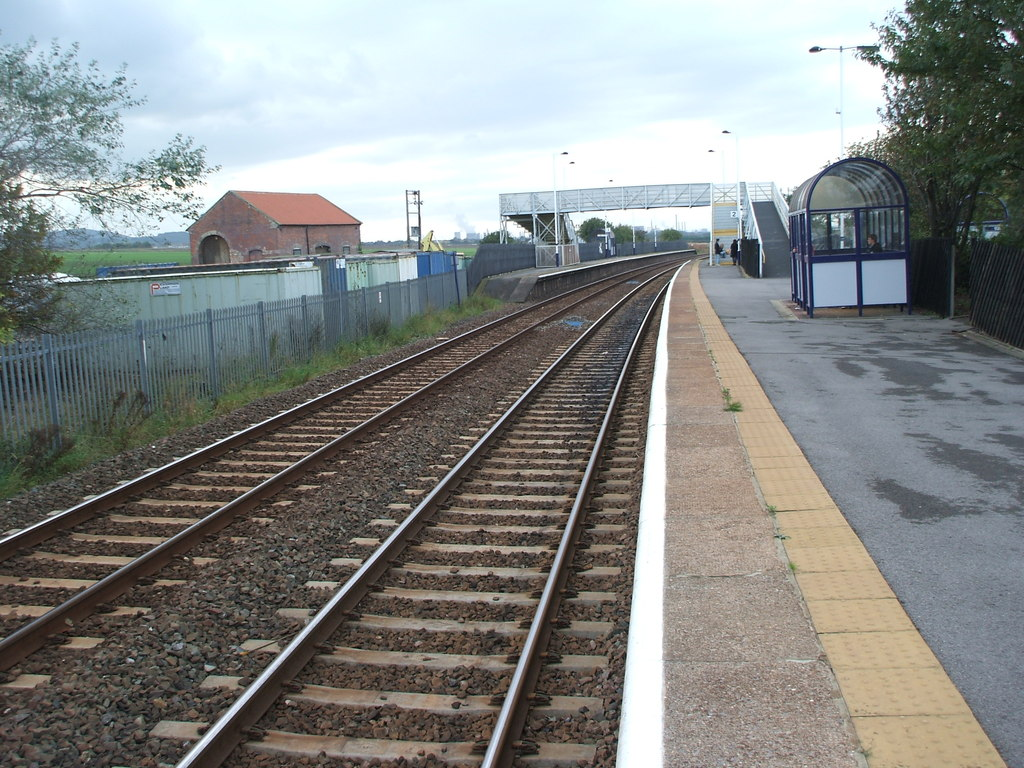

General information
- Location: Marske-by-the-Sea, Redcar and Cleveland; England
- Coordinates: 54°35′15″N 1°01′10″W
- Grid reference: NZ634218
- Owner: Network Rail
- Manager: Northern Trains
- Platforms: 2
- Tracks: 2

Other information
- Station code: MSK
- Classification: DfT category F2

History
- Original company: North Eastern Railway
- Pre-grouping: North Eastern Railway
- Post-grouping: London and North Eastern Railway; British Rail (North Eastern Region)

Key dates
- 19 August 1861: Opened

Passengers
- 2021/22: ▲44,406
- 2022/23: ▲50,050
- 2023/24: ▲56,524
- 2024/25: ▲62,908
- 2025/26: ▲68,926
Location
- Location within North Yorkshire
Notes
- Passenger statistics from the Office of Rail and Road

Marske is a railway station on the Tees Valley Line, which runs between Bishop Auckland and Saltburn via Darlington. The station, situated 10 miles 65 chains (17.4 km) east of Middlesbrough, serves the village of Marske-by-the-Sea, Redcar and Cleveland in North Yorkshire, England. It is owned by Network Rail and managed by Northern Trains.

== History ==
The railway station is the oldest in the village of Marske-by-the-Sea having opened with the line in 1861. The other station, Longbeck, was opened in 1985. The station was also mentioned in George Bradshaw's 1863 railway guide. the station is 25 miles (40 km) east of Darlington, 10 miles 65 chains (17.4 km) east of Middlesbrough, and just under 2 miles (3.2 km) west of Saltburn.

The station has slightly staggered platforms, and lost its goods facilities in April 1965, and became an unstaffed halt in February 1970.

=== Tees Valley Metro ===
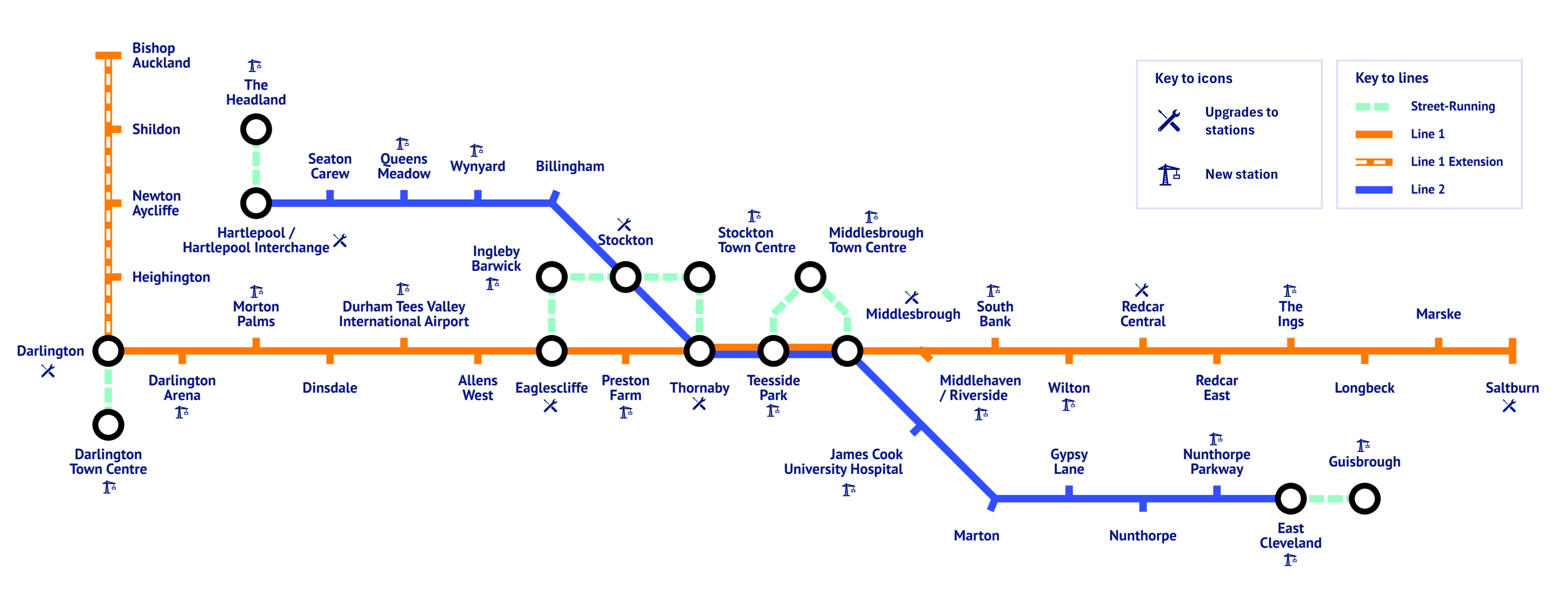
Transit diagram showcasing all discussed or mentioned ideas for the Tees Valley Metro.

Starting in 2006, Marske was mentioned within the Tees Valley Metro scheme. This was a plan to upgrade the Tees Valley Line and sections of the Esk Valley Line and Durham Coast Line to provide a faster and more frequent service across the North East of England. In the initial phases the services would have been heavy rail mostly along existing alignments with new additional infrastructure and rollingstock. The later phase would have introduced tram-trains to allow street running and further heavy rail extensions.

As part of the scheme, Markse station would have received improved service to Darlington and Saltburn (1–2 to 4 trains per hour) and new rollingstock.

However, due to a change in government in 2010 and the 2008 financial crisis, the project was ultimately shelved. Several stations eventually got their improvements and there is a possibility of improved rollingstock and services in the future which may affect Marske.

== Facilities ==
Station facilities here have been improved. The package for this station included new fully lit waiting shelters, renewed station signage and the installation of CCTV. The long-line Public Address system (PA) has been renewed and upgraded with pre-recorded train announcements.

== Services ==
As of the May 2021 timetable change, the station is served by two trains per hour between Saltburn and Darlington via Middlesbrough, with one train per hour extending to Bishop Auckland. An hourly service operates between Saltburn and Bishop Auckland on Sunday. All services are operated by Northern Trains.

Rolling stock used: Class 156 Super Sprinter and Class 158 Express Sprinter

Preceding station	National Rail	Following station
Saltburn	Northern Trains; Tees Valley Line	Longbeck
