= Huntcliff School, Saltburn-by-the-Sea =

Foundation school in Saltburn-by-the-Sea, Redcar and Cleveland, England

Huntcliff School

Location
- Marske Mill Lane – Saltburn-by-the-Sea, Redcar and Cleveland, TS12 1HJ; England
- Coordinates: 54.57924°N 0.98125°W

Information
- Type: Academy
- Local authority: Redcar and Cleveland
- Trust: Vision Academy Learning Trust
- Department for Education URN: 148335 Tables
- Ofsted: Reports
- Staff: 50
- Gender: Co-educational
- Age: 11 to 16
- Enrolment: 540 (2019)
- Website: https://www.saltburnlearningcampus.co.uk/huntcliff-school/

Huntcliff School is a co-educational secondary school located in Saltburn-by-the-Sea, a town in the north-east of England. At the Ofsted inspection of 2019, the school had a register of 540 pupils.

The first school on the site, opened in 1960, was called the County Modern School.

In 2007 work began on a new secondary school on the same site, to replace the current buildings, and re-opened in September 2008. This work resulted in the demolition of two school buildings which had been constructed only a few years earlier, as they could not be incorporated into the new campus.

In a second phase of construction, a replacement for Saltburn Primary School was planned. The scheme had a total budget of £15 million.

Huntcliff Secondary School is now based on Saltburn Learning Campus.

In September 2009, Saltburn Primary School (whose previous buildings were based in two separate locations in the town) joined Huntcliff School within a separate wing of Saltburn Learning Campus - this was officially opened by author Gervase Phinn. Saltburn Children's Centre is also based on the campus grounds.

Huntcliff School currently has 536 students on roll, consisting of those from Saltburn and its surrounding areas.

It offers a variety of curriculum subjects, including the core subjects of English, Maths and Science, as well as History, Geography, Art & Design, Technology, ICT, Performing Arts, Modern Foreign Languages, PE, Sport Science, Life Skills, Photography and Media Studies. Additional subjects were previously available to students, such as AS Level Politics and Further Maths.

Huntcliff School has a secure partnership with the No. 17 Middle School in Bao Ding, China, which has been established for at least 3 years. In 2010, Huntcliff students and staff visited their partner school for a 10-day-long visit. Every year since the partnership, students and staff from the partner school have visited Huntcliff School and met people from the local community.

Previously a foundation school administered by Redcar and Cleveland Borough Council, in January 2021 Huntcliff School converted to academy status. The school is now sponsored by the Vision Academy Learning Trust.
