= Hutton =

Hutton may refer to:

== Places ==
=== Antarctica ===
- Hutton Cliffs, Ross Island
- Hutton Mountains

=== Australia ===
- Hutton Sandstone Formation

=== Canada ===
- Hutton, Alberta, a locality
- Hutton, British Columbia, a railway point
- Hutton railway station, British Columbia

=== England ===
- Hutton, Cumbria, a civil parish
- Hutton, Essex, a former village, now a commuter suburb of Brentwood
- Hutton, Lancashire, a village and civil parish
- Hutton, Somerset, a village and civil parish
- Hutton Cranswick, East Riding of Yorkshire, formed by the merger of two villages still referred to by their separate names
- Hutton Henry, County Durham
- Hutton-le-Hole, North Yorkshire
- Hutton Roof (disambiguation), two places in Cumbria
- Hutton Village, a village near Guisborough in North Yorkshire
- Sand Hutton, North Yorkshire
- Sheriff Hutton, North Yorkshire

=== Scotland ===
- Hutton, Scottish Borders, a village
- Hutton Castle, Scottish Borders
- Hutton oilfield, North Sea

=== United States ===
- Hutton, Indiana, an unincorporated town
- Hutton, Maryland, an unincorporated community
- Hutton Township, Coles County, Illinois

== Outer space ==
- Hutton (lunar crater)
- Hutton (Martian crater)
- 6130 Hutton, an asteroid

== People ==
- Hutton (surname), a list of people
- Hutton Gibson (1918–2020), American writer, Jeopardy game show champion, and father of actor and director Mel Gibson
- Hutton Webster (1875–1955), American anthropologist, economist and sociologist

== Other uses ==
- Hutton Companies, a Southern California real estate developer
- Hutton Gate railway station, a railway station near Hutton Lowcross, North Yorkshire, England, closed 1964
- Hutton Grammar School, Lancashire, England
- Hutton Hall (Guisborough), a grade II listed building near Hutton Lowcross, North Yorkshire, England
- Hutton Honors College, the honors program of Indiana University
- Hutton Inquiry, a 2003 judicial inquiry in the UK
