= Ironstone mining in Cleveland and North Yorkshire =

Ironstone mines and quarries in Cleveland and North Yorkshire, England

Coordinates: 54.527°N 0.953°W

- Kilton Ironstone Mine spoil tip

Location
- County: Yorkshire, North Riding (Note: The last mine/working closed in 1964, ten years (1974) before North Yorkshire was created. North Yorkshire initially included the majority of Cleveland while a separate county, also called Cleveland, was operating. North Yorkshire was expanded to include all of historic Cleveland in 1996, when the separate county disbanded.)
- Country: England

Production
- Commodity: Ironstone
- Production: 6,750,000 tonnes (7,440,000 tons)
- Year: 1883

Ironstone mining in Cleveland and North Yorkshire occurred on a sizeable scale from the 1830s to the 1960s in present-day eastern parts of North Yorkshire but was recorded as far back as Roman times mostly on a small scale and intended for local use. Around the year 1850, large seams of ironstone were discovered in the Cleveland Hills, later also in and around Rosedale and Eskdale. Mining of these seams accelerated an industry around the River Tees's south eastern banks and around the River Tyne, where many new ironworks were built. Settlements around the Tees and Tyne, especially the Cleveland town of Middlesbrough (on the Tees) developed as iron- and steel-processing centres. They received large amounts of ironstone, first by ship and later by railway. The industry experienced a meteoric rise, in the space of twenty years (by 1870), and ironstone from the Cleveland part of Yorkshire was supplying 38% of the steel and iron requirements of Britain.

Ironstone workings in the area declined from the 1930s onwards because imported iron ore could be shipped in vast quantities to the quaysides at Middlesbrough and on the Tyne. The last commercially operated ironstone mine was near Skelton-in-Cleveland. The North Skelton Mine closed in January 1964. Restoration schemes have restored some mine sites and they have been opened to public access. Water draining out of mines has polluted some watercourses in the area.

== History ==
=== Table of output (1857–1880) ===
Combined output from the ironstone mines of the Cleveland Hills (1857–1880)

The list covers all the ironstone mines in the Cleveland Ironstone Formation and as such extends into parts of North Yorkshire that were not traditionally designated as being in Cleveland. (Note: Most British Geological Survey documents refer to the ironstone workings as a whole district; the Liassic Ironstones paper published in 1952, states that Cleveland refers to the tract of land south from the River Tees to the Vale of Pickering which includes the hills completely where ironstone may occur.) The list only covers areas of productive ironstone mining, and so does not include test areas (ie Goldsborough on the North Yorkshire coast where drilling was undertaken for three years from 1912). Ironstone production helped fuel the industrial revolution with smelters and ironworks in Middlesbrough accounting for 33% of iron and steel production in Britain in 1865. By 1870, Britain was supplying about half of all the iron and steel across the world; 38% of that, was made from iron mined in the Cleveland Hills and North Yorkshire. The table below shows the combined production of ironstone from the Cleveland Hills between 1857 and 1880.

Combined output from the ironstone mines of the Cleveland Hills (1857–1880)
Year	No. of mines	Production	Year	No. of mines	Production	Year	No. of mines	Production
1857	17	1,414,155 tonnes (1,558,839 tons)	1865	20	2,762,359 tonnes (3,044,980 tons)	1873	35	5,617,014 tonnes (6,191,698 tons)
1858	17	1,367,395 tonnes (1,507,295 tons)	1866	19	2,809,061 tonnes (3,096,460 tons)	1874	35	5,614,322 tonnes (6,188,731 tons)
1859	15	1,520,542 tonnes (1,676,111 tons)	1867	17	2,739,039 tonnes (3,019,274 tons)	1875	39	6,121,794 tonnes (6,748,123 tons)
1860	17	1,471,319 tonnes (1,621,852 tons)	1868	15	2,785,307 tonnes (3,070,275 tons)	1876	36	6,562,000 tonnes (7,233,000 tons)
1861	17	1,212,414 tonnes (1,336,458 tons)	1869	16	3,094,678 tonnes (3,411,299 tons)	1877	33	6,284,545 tonnes (6,927,525 tons)
1862	16	1,689,966 tonnes (1,862,869 tons)	1870	17	4,072,888 tonnes (4,489,591 tons)	1878	29	5,603,639 tonnes (6,176,955 tons)
1863	13	2,078,806 tonnes (2,291,491 tons)	1871	21	4,581,901 tonnes (5,050,681 tons)	1879	29	4,750,000 tonnes (5,240,000 tons)
1864	14	2,401,890 tonnes (2,647,630 tons)	1872	31	4,974,950 tonnes (5,483,940 tons)	1880	29	6,486,654 tonnes (7,150,312 tons)

=== Early history ===
Evidence of iron working in the area dates back as far as the Roman times, with an ironworks at Levisham working iron believed to have been sourced from Rosedale. The iron from the Cleveland seams is known to have been worked in Eskdale prior to 1750. A farm at Danby was marked on mapping as Furnace Farm and had evidence of scoria heaps (slag). Other slag heaps have been found in Glaisdale (that pre-date the Victorian ironworks) and Fryup Dale too. Other workings south of Goathland, known as the Killing Pits (Note: The name Killing Pits ("Holly Pits") may be derived from Cornish kelin or Welsh celyn, (Note: WiKtionary : Welsh < celyn > " holly ".)) also show evidence of having been worked in the post-Medieval period, but before the 19th century industrial extraction of ironstone in the area.

Nodules of ironstone were quarried from the beaches and cliffs between Staithes and Kettleness since the 1830s, but this was at the mercy of the weather and the tides as the ironstone was transported by sea. Most of the ironstone collected on the Yorkshire Coast was shipped to ironworks in, and around, the Newcastle area, using sea and river transport for a large part of its journey. When large-scale mining was introduced, most of the mining areas were connected to the railway network either by their own lines or via a narrow gauge railway which connected to main railway network. A small number used direct sea transportation, but in the end, they closed down or converted to railway operation. The growth of the railway system in North Yorkshire actually led to the discovery of ironstone in the area, when the Whitby and Pickering Railway reached Grosmont in 1835, with shipping of ironstone from Grosmont, via the railway, then ship from Whitby harbour, in 1836.

Quarrying and mining on the Yorkshire coast for alum were commonplace but were dying out in the latter half of the 19th century when it was discovered that alum could be sourced from colliery waste. The boom in the ironstone industry meant that some communities had a new occupational lifeline. The discovery of the Eston ironstone by Henry Bolckow and John Vaughan in 1850 accelerated the industrialisation of the area since the ironstone outcropped quite close to the surface and could be recovered more easily than on the coast, which was dependent on the tides, and from the mines further south, which had to go to greater depths to recover the stone. In August 1850, the find of stone was proved, and by December of the same year the first shipment of ironstone, 136 tonnes (150 tons), was taken over a newly built tramway from Eston into Middlesbrough. The Rosedale mines developed in the 1860s and were connected via a railway that ran across the moors and down a steep incline near Ingleby Greenhow, which then joined the main railway network at what would become Battersby railway station. The ore at Rosedale was roasted with coal (calcined) to remove impurities and lessen the overall weight of the ore so that the transport costs were cheaper, as the companies had to pay the landowners per tonne of ore transported over the railway.

=== Peak production ===
Iron ore usage on South Teesside 1913 – 1936, expressed in tonnes

Production across the region as whole peaked in 1883, when 6,750,000 tonnes (7,440,000 tons) of ore were processed. After that, tonnages declined steadily. In 1936, the contribution to UK steel production from the north east was 27.3%, but by this time much of the ore was being imported. Apart from a dip in 1922, the smelters on Teesside first started using a greater proportion of imported ore over that mined locally in 1936.

Iron ore use in iron and steelworks on South Teesside
Year	Cleveland ore	Imported ore	Total	Percentage ratio
1913	5,940,963	2,257,576	8,198,539	72.46 / 27.54
1918	4,544,135	1,507,795	6,051,930	75.09 / 24.91
1922	1,169,700	1,537,144	2,706,844	43.21 / 66.79
1925	2,284,186	1,468,560	3,752,746	60.87 / 39.13
1928	2,272,124	1,362,273	3,634,397	62.52 / 37.48
1931	1,493,916	765,205	2,259,121	66.13 / 33.87
1933	1,012,700	817,956	1,830,656	55.32 / 44.68
1934	1,641,921	1,504,111	3,146,032	52.19 / 47.81
1935	1,640,090	1,517,951	3,158,041	51.93 / 48.07
1936	1,800,000	2,034,305	3,834,305	46.94 / 53.06

Production of ironstone in the area declined as opencast and quarried ironstone from other UK locations became prevalent owing to it being cheaper to quarry than mining. For example, the ironstone workings in Northamptonshire were all surface operations, therefore could be mechanised more easily without the need for timber props nor the time and labour required to install the timbers. This meant that by the interwar years, Northamptonshire iron ore was five shillings per tonne cheaper to transport than Cleveland ore. In addition the global recession in the early 1920s led to a drop in the price of iron. Closures were further exacerbated by imported iron ore. The last industrial operation of mining ore in the area was at North Skelton, which ended in January 1964.

== Occurrence ==
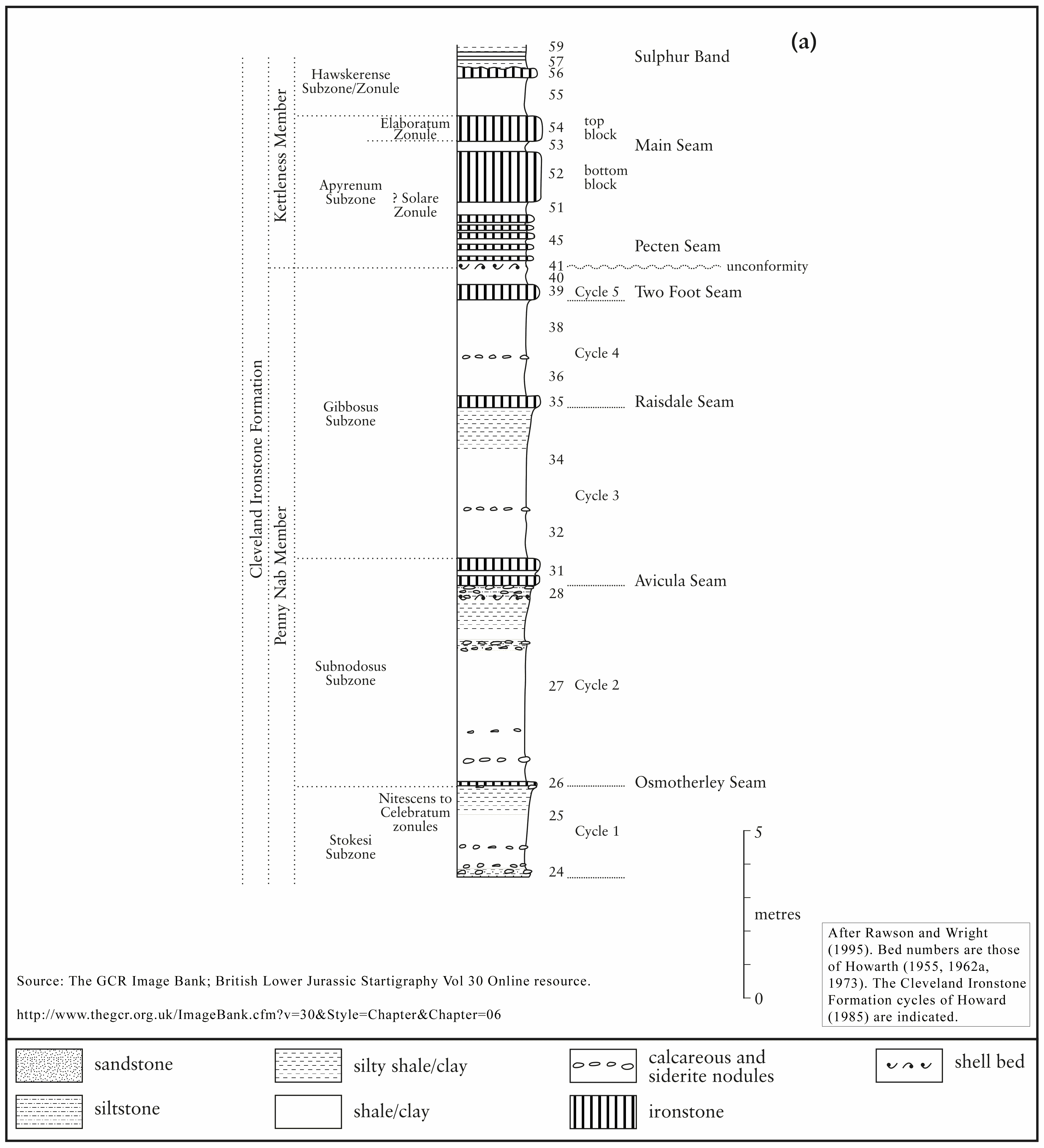
Section through the Cleveland Ironstone

Apportioning strict geography to the area is different according to various sources; most agree, however, that the Cleveland Hills (or the Cleveland District) are tied in with the occurrence of the ironstone in whatever seam and thus it extends from the Tees at Middlesbrough in the north to the Vale of Pickering in the south. The North Sea coast provides the eastern limit, whilst the Scugdale Valley down through Felixkirk to Thirsk is seen as the western border.

Mining of ironstone can be grouped into three distinct localities: Cleveland mines which worked the main Cleveland seam, the Rosedale mines, which worked the Dogger seam and those grouped around Grosmont and the Esk Valley which worked the Avicula and Pecten seams. The exceptions to this rule are those on the coast south of Boulby (particularly Port Mulgrave) which worked the Dogger seam, and several localities that worked the Two-Foot Seam. Those mining concerns in the eastern part of Cleveland, centered around Brotton and Loftus, worked the ironstone band where it dipped in a depression, and so were the ones most likely to need shaft and deep mining experience. North Skelton was the deepest at 720 feet (220 m), followed by Kilton at 680 feet (210 m), and Lingdale at 620 feet (190 m).

Both the Avicula and Pecten seams were named after particular fossils which were abundant in those layers, Avicula cygnipes (now known as Oxytoma cygnipes) and Pecten (now formally known as Pseudopecten aequivalvis). However some stone was quarried/mined even further south than the Murk Esk valley: at Kirby Knowle, near Thirsk, workings in the Dogger Seam were explored in the 19th century, where the ironstone is known to be 6–7 inches (150–180 mm) thick. It was estimated that the occurrence of ironstone underneath Cleveland and North Yorkshire extended for 500 square miles (1,300 km^{2}). The various seams had different names in places, sometimes on account of their geology, others owing to a confusion of which seam was being mined; the Avicula seam was also known as the Low Seam owing to its position and the Pecten seam was sometimes called the Shelly Seam owing to the abundance of shells within it.

Methods of recovering ironstone varied with location: most of the early mines centred around Grosmont used a system known as the double-stall and others used the longwall method, whereas most mines and drifts winning stone from the Main Seam used the pillar and bord way of mining.

== Mines ==
Ironstone mines in Cleveland and North Yorkshire
Mine	Location	Dates	Type (Note: C-coastal, D-drift, M-mine, S-surface.)	Seam (Note: AS-Avivcula, DS-Dogger, MS-Main Seam, PS-Pecten, TS-Two-foot Seam.)	Grid ref	Notes	Ref
Ailesbury Mine	Whorlton	1872–1887	M	MS	NZ494008	Most productive return was in 1874, when almost 95,000 tonnes (105,000 tons) was produced, with a value of £28,500.	
Aysdalegate Mine	Lockwood	1863–1880	M	MS	NZ652149	Later became part of the Spawood Mine as ventilation shafts.	
Ayton Banks Mine	Great Ayton	1909–1929	M	MS	NZ581109		
Ayton Mines	Great Ayton	1908–1931	M	MS	NZ581109	Also known as Monument Mine, due to its proximity to the Captain Cook Monument on the hill. A steep incline provided for onwards transportation via the Great Ayton Branch line.	
Beck Hole	Grosmont	1858–1864	D	DS	NZ822018	Historically known as Beckhole.	
Belmont Mine	Guisborough	1853–1933	D, S	MS	NZ616145	Also known as the Belman Bank Mines.	
Blakey Pit	Farndale	1876–1895	D, S	DS	SE680979	Also known as Farndale.	
Boosbeck	Boosbeck	1872–1887	M	MS	NZ658168	The mine was quite productive (480,000 tonnes (530,000 tons) in 1881), but was beset by problems. It caused subsidence to the village and 700 were made homeless. An inrush of water in 1887 closed the workings.	
Boulby	Boulby	1854–1860; 1903–1934	D	MS	NZ760181	Worked in two stages; the 19th century venture failed owing to lack of good transport. The 20th-century workings used the railway to transport the iron ore to Skinningrove Iron Works. The site now forms part of the Boulby Mine complex.	
Brotton	Brotton	1865–1921	M	MS, TS	NZ685201		
Carlin How	Carlin How	1869–1946	M	MS, TS	NZ710192		
Chaloner Mine	Guisborough	1869–1939	D, M, S	MS	NZ605173		
Cliff	Brotton	1857–1887	M	MS	NZ689216	Before the arrival of the railway in 1865, the ironstone is thought to have been dumped over the cliff and collected from the seashore. Closed in 1877, it was reopened in 1880 and connected underground with Huntcliff Mine.	
Coate Moor Mine	Kildale	1872–1876	D	MS, PS, TS	NZ511604	Short-lived venture; the mine and buildings were repossessed in 1875 because of non-payment of rents	
Codhill (Note: Also known as Hutton Lowcrop, or Hutton Lowcross/Low Cross.)	Hutton Lowcross	1853–1886	D	MS	NZ600137	The building of the Middlesbrough & Guisborough railway allowed for the exploitation of the ironstone in this district.	
Commondale Mine	Commondale	1863–1867	M	MS	NZ664103		
Court Green	Eston	c. 1883–c. 1893	S	MS	NZ590180		
Crags Hall Mine	Brotton	1867–1893	M	MS	NZ701196	Sometimes spelt as Craggs Hall.	
Eskdale Mine	Grosmont	1848–1878; 1906–1915	D	AS	NZ837059	North east of Grosmont with railway sidings direct onto the Whitby & Pickering Railway with the ore being taken to Chester-le-Street, then in the second incarnation, used locally at Grosmont Ironworks.	
Eskdale (Bolton Crag)	Grosmont	1848–1852	D	AS	NZ852063	Workings developed by Losh, Wilson and Bell, but abandoned in favour of a seam discovered near Skinningrove	
Esk Valley Mine (Note: Also known as Holme House Mine owing to being located at Holm(e) House in the hamlet of Esk Valley.)	Grosmont	1859–1877	M	AS	NZ822044	Located on the original Whitby to Pickering Railway Beck Hole section	
Eston Mine (complex)	Eston	1850–1949	S, D, M	MS	NZ563183	In 1850, the ironstone was extracted from the surface, but as the workings progressed southwards into the hill, drifting became necessary and later still deep mining was required. At least three pit heads were established at the Eston complex for drawing the ironstone to the surface; Old Bank Drift, New bank Drift, and Trustee Level Drift.	
Glaisdale		1862–1876	M	AS, PS	NZ779054		
Grinkle Mine	Grinkle Park	1875–1934	D	MS	NZ762178	Ironstone forwarded originally to Port Mulgrave for sea transport	
Grosmont Haggs (Grosmont West)	Grosmont	1864–1890	M	AS, PS	NZ823058	This worling was north west of Grosmont, and described as having "shallow shafts".	
Grosmont, Hollins	Grosmont	1836–1860; 1863–1866	D, M	AS, PS	NZ831057	The seam was discovered when construction was underway for the Whitby and Pickering Railway. Before the North Yorkshire and Cleveland Railway reached Grosmont railway station from the west, iron ore was transported via rail to Whitby and thence to Tyneside by ship.	
Hob Hill	Saltburn	1865–1874; 1899–1920	D, S	MS, PS	NZ656205	Ironstone may have been won after 1920, as records indicate the mine was merged with Upleatham around this time. Mapping from the 1910s, shows Hob Hill and Upleatham connected by an aerial ropeway.	
Huntcliff (Note: Also known as Huntcliffe and Hunt Cliff.)	Brotton	1872–1906	D	MS	NZ697214	Mining commenced between 1870 and 1872. It was later connected underground with the Cliff Mine.	
Hummersea Bank Mine	Loftus		C		NZ734200		
Hutton Mine	Hutton Lowcross	1855–1858	D, S	MS	NZ603134	Sub-surface workings of the mine were incorporated within the Roseberry Mine workings in the early 20th century. The distance between the two was only 1.2 miles (2 km).	
Ingleby Manor Mines (Ingleby Moor)	Ingleby Greenhow	1858–1865	D	MS	NZ607023	Reached by a small spur from the Rosedale railway line.	
Kettleness	Goldsborough	1838–1842; 1854–1857	C	MS	NZ831160	Ironstone sourced from the cliffs and beach, loaded onto ships for the Tyneside smelters of Losh, Wilson & Bell	
Kettleness Mine	Goldsborough	1910–1915	C	DS	NZ822152	North Eastern Railway records show that the Kettleness railway station handled 2,595 tonnes (2,860 tons) of iron ore in 1911.	
Kilton		1870–1876; 1894–1963	M	MS	NZ695169	The conical shaped-heap of waste ironstone material is notable locally. The site is now a nature reserve.	
Kirkleatham	Dunsdale	1872–1886	D	MS	NZ608186		
Levisham		1863–1874	M	See note	SE824929	Mine worked the Cornbrash (Ferrugious Sandstone) to the north west of Levisham village.	
Lingdale Mine	Lingdale	1870–1962	M	MS	NZ677165	Lay dormant between 1926 and 1940. Work restarted after four kilns were moved from the island of Raasay.	
Liverton Mine	Loftus	1871–1923	M	MS	NZ710180		
Loftus Mines	Loftus	1830–1958	C, D	MS	NZ711192		
Longacres Mine	Skelton	1865–1954 (1916)	M	MS	NZ668194	Operated by Bolckow, Vaughan until 1929, Dorman Long thereafter. Output from 1916 was taken by a 1-mile (1.6 km) incline into North Skelton Mine	
Lonsdale	Kildale	1865–1868	M	MS	NZ605105		
Lumpsey Mine	Brotton	1880–1954	M	MS	NZ686187	Official closure was in 1954, but ironstone from Lumpsey was mined and brought to the surface at North Skelton Mine until closure of North Skelton in 1964.	
Mirkside West	Grosmont	1857–1869	S	AS	NZ819035	Also known as Murkside and Murk Side, due to being near the River Murk Esk	
Normanby Mine	Normanby	1859–1899	D, S	MS	NZ553169		
North Skelton	North Skelton	1872–1964	M	MS	NZ675183	Last mine to close in Cleveland	
Ormesby	Ormesby	1865–1892	D, S	MS	NZ541166	The seam occurs quite near to the surface, and roof falls at the site of the mine have been commonplace	
Port Mulgrave (Note: Port Mulgrave was originally named Rosedale (Rosedale Wyke), which was the name of the area. When the ironstone industry flourished in the valley of Rosedale Abbey to the west, this site was renamed Port Mulgrave after the local castle and family. The sheer output from the new Rosedale, outweighed the amount of ironstone that Port Mulgrave was producing, so a decision was taken to rename the site to avoid confusion.)	Port Mulgrave	1857–1881	C, D, S	MS	NZ545167	Entire output from Port Mulgrave was transported via ship. When Port Mulgrave was exhausted, a railway was cut through the cliff to Grinkle Mine, with Port Mulgrave continuing as an export facility.	
Raithwaite Mine	Sandsend	1855–1860	C, D	DS	NZ870119	A drift mine cut into the coast which has been destroyed by coastal erosion. The ironstone was loaded directly onto boats	
Roseberry Mine	Great Ayton	1881–1883; 1907–1924	D	MS, TS	NZ580124	The site was initially closed in 1883, reopening 24 years later in 1907; in 1917, it was one of the most productive sites in Cleveland	
Rosedale East	Rosedale	1866–1926	D	DS	SE707989		
Rosedale West	Rosedale	1853–1885	D	DS	SE723946		
Sherriff's Pit	Rosedale West	1874–1911	M	DS	SE698962	Was connected to the Rosedale Railway. The mine was named after Alexander Sherriff - one of the owners	
Skelton Mine	Skelton	1861–1938	M	TS	NZ637169		
Skelton Park Pit	Skelton	1872–1938	M	MS, TS	NZ644180	The mine produced over 18,555,000 tonnes (20,453,000 tons) during its lifetime	
Slapewath Mines	Slapewath	1864–1884; 1886–1906	D, M	MS	NZ646148	Stone from Slapewath was progressively taken out via Spawood mine from 1890 onwards until closure of the shafts at Slapewath (apart from ventilation) from 1906.	
Sleights Bridge	Sleights	1856–1859	M	AS, PS	NZ865082	Worked by the Eskdale Ironstone Company. The stone was between 30 and 50% iron.	
South Skelton Mine	Boosbeck	1872–1959	M	MS	NZ654164		
Spa	Guisborough	1864–1904	D, S	MS	NZ639158		
Spawood Mine	Slapewath	1864–1930	M	MS, TS	NZ636157		
Stanghow Mine	Stanghow	1873–1925	M	MS	NZ654156		
Upleatham	Upleatham	1854–1923	D, S	MS	NZ625204		
Upsall	Eston	1853–1945	M	MS	NZ573173	Also known as Upsal. Iron quarried from here was first sent to an ironworks on Tyneside in 1811, with the response stating that the stone was "good for nothing".	
Warren Moor Mine	Kildale	1865–1874	D	DS, MS	NZ625088	The chimney still stands at this location – the only Victorian ironstone mine chimney left in the United Kingdom	
Waterfall	Guisborough	1880–1901	M	MS	NZ626172		
Whitecliffe	Loftus	1871–1884	M	MS	NZ711189		
Wintergill		1878–1881	D	See note	NZ760018	This short-lived mine worked the Ellerbeck Seam and exported its stone through Egton railway station being delivered there by horse and cart. A railway connection was proposed, but never built.	

== Iron and steelworks ==
Some of the mines roasted their iron ore, which enriched the final product before leaving the mine area, this being most notable at Rosedale where the former kilns are part of the heritage of the area and are listed as a scheduled monument. An ironworks was built at Skinningrove, which produced pig iron from ore mined at Loftus, just across Kilton Beck. Whilst Loftus Mine closed in 1958, the plant is still operational, producing steel profiles with raw steel railed in from primary smelters located in Lincolnshire.

Many of the companies that were working the ironstone, also had limestone and coal ventures in other parts of the north-east region, this allowed for the iron and steelworks to proliferate on the south bank of the River Tees. This, combined with the ability to ship pig iron from the docks at a cheap rate led to the ironstone and pig iron industry on south Teesside being the most prolific in output for England and Scotland. Other major iron and steel centres in Northamptonshire, Shropshire and Staffordshire had overland transport costs.

== Aftermath ==
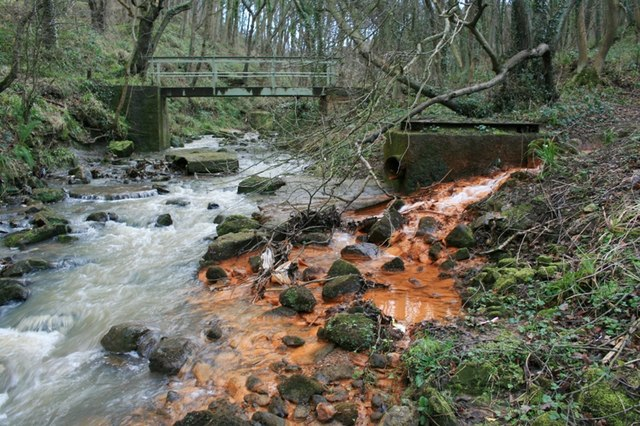
Waytail Beck, Whitecliff Wood; the iron in the water is from the former Liverton Mine operation

Several becks on the coast have been affected by pollution. As the mines closed down, so the pumps were turned off and this stopped the contaminated water being pumped away. Kilton Beck has been badly affected by this, with tales of how locals could fish in the beck, but it spent a good part of the second half of the 20th century heavily poisoned and was described as being ochre in colour. It has since been remediated by a system of oxidating the ferrous content in the water. In the North York Moors National Park, remediation ponds have been created at Six Howe and Clitherbeck, which have helped to reduce the iron pollution in local watercourses.

Progressive closure of the mines also led to mass unemployment; Skinningrove was a very small fishing village, fairly isolated from the rest of Cleveland when the ironstone boom arrived. After closure of the mines, unemployment levels surged. The miners' livelihoods were also affected by the slump in the early 1930s; one author noted that those who took part in the Jarrow March, were struck by an unemployment rate of 70%, in the East Cleveland ironstone communities, this was nearer 90%.

The closure of the ironstone mines also left a legacy of subsidence, which unlike the coal industry, had no official framework for compensation or remediation. The spoil tip at Kilton remains, and in 1990, was the subject of a public inquiry into whether the tip should be reclaimed. However, the inspector found that it "...was now a uniquely recognisable industrial archaeological relic in East Cleveland...[and] its retention far outweighed the benefits of its removal."

In 2017, a four-year project was started to preserve the remains and provide better access to the historic sites at Rosedale and Warren Moor. The project was allocated £3.8 million, and would also involve the protection of wildlife habitats on previous ironstone workings. Bridges on the original section of the Whitby to Pickering Railway between Beck Hole and Grosmont, were renovated in 2020, with new boards by the site of Esk Valley Mine. This was done as part of the Land of Iron project.

In 1983, the Cleveland Ironstone Mining Museum was opened near to the Skinningrove Steelworks in a former ironstone drift mine. The museum also offers the opportunity for people to tour the drift part of the mine.

A monument to those who worked in the ironstone industry was unveiled in Skelton in April 2019. The sculpture is of three miners and is titled "The Spirit of East Cleveland".

== Listed buildings ==
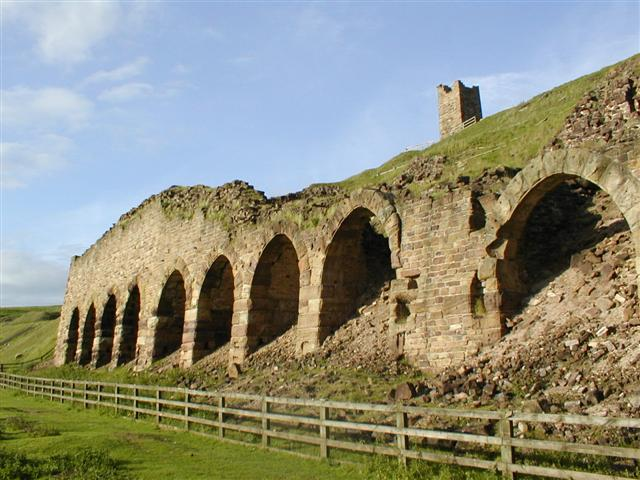
Calcining Kilns, Rosedale East

The mine buildings on the surface of Skelton Park pit are the most numerous of those which are listed with Historic England. These include the fanhouse, the main engine house, the powerhouse, the provender house, the secondary winding engine and the workshops. Other listed structures at other locations include:

- Rosedale East Mines calcining kilns and iron mines – scheduled ancient monument
- Skelton Shaft Mine explosives magazine – grade II listed
- Skelton Shaft Mine Guibal fanhouse – grade II listed
- Trustee Drift Level Mine – Powder Magazine and Adjoining Blast Walls – grade II listed
- Warren Moor Mine chimney – grade II listed

== See also ==
- Bolckow, Vaughan
- Cleveland Ironstone Formation
- Grosmont ironworks
- Losh, Wilson and Bell
- Rosedale Railway
- Ironstone mining in Rosedale

== Gallery ==
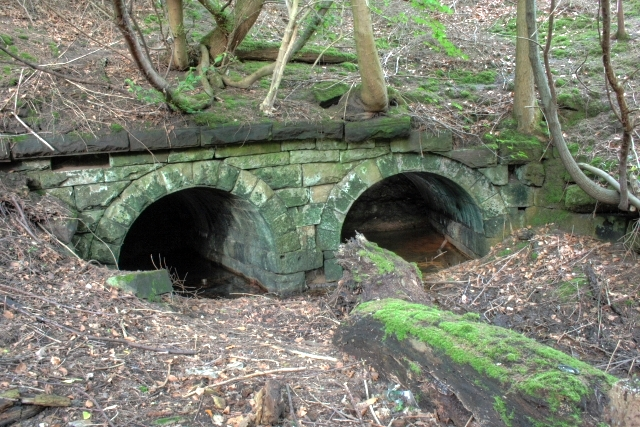
Ailesbury Ironstone Mine

Former Mine Buildings, Aysdalegate Ironstone Mine

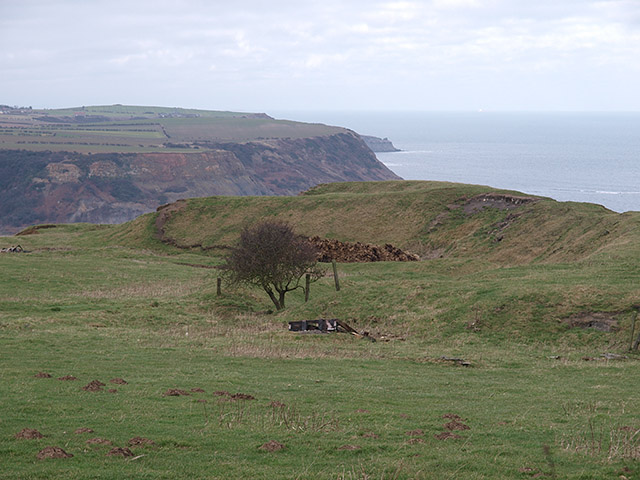
Site of Kettleness ironstone mine

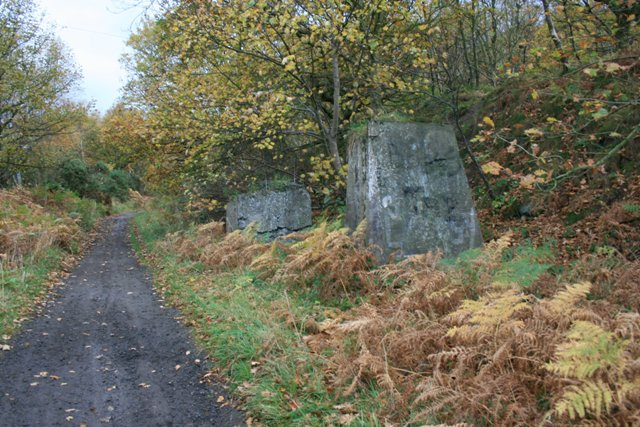
Concrete Foundations, Eston Ironstone Mine

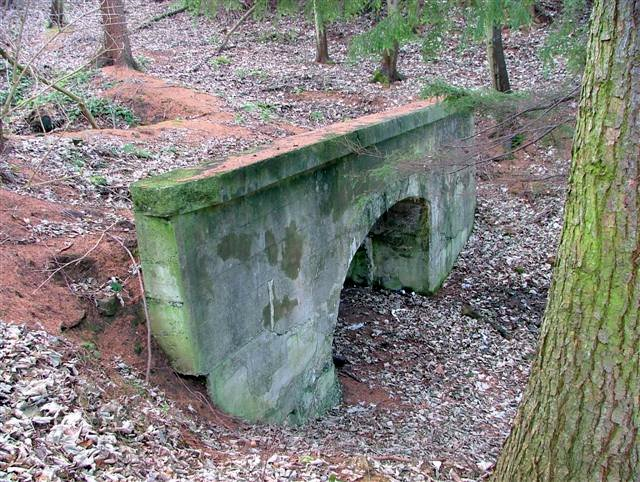
Belmont Ironstone Mine

Ventilation Shaft, Tocketts Ironstone Mine
