= Hutton Village =

Village in North Yorkshire, England

Coordinates: 54.516°N 1.072°W

Hutton Village: Hutton Lowcross
- Village
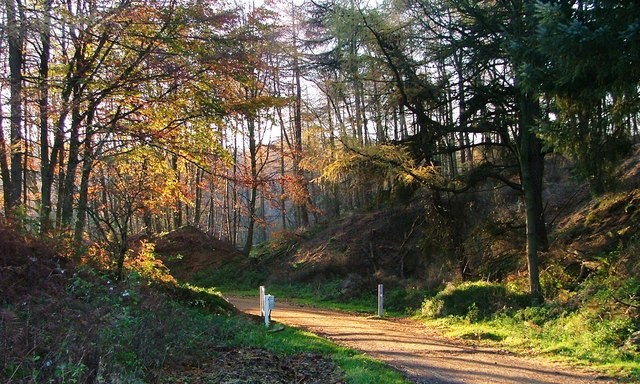
- Forest Track and Gate, Hutton Lowcross

- Location within North Yorkshire
- OS grid reference: NZ601138
- Civil parish: Guisborough
- Unitary authority: Redcar and Cleveland
- Ceremonial county: North Yorkshire
- Region: North East
- Country: England
- Sovereign state: United Kingdom
- Post town: GUISBOROUGH
- Postcode district: TS14
- Police: Cleveland
- Fire: Cleveland
- Ambulance: North East
- UK Parliament: Middlesbrough South and East Cleveland

Hutton Village is a settlement in the Hutton Lowcross area of Guisborough in North Yorkshire, England. Whilst the area itself is mentioned in the Domesday Book, the village was built largely due to the development of the ironstone industry in the Cleveland Hills. The name Hutton Lowcross referred to the township in the area, whereas the settlement is now known as Hutton Village. The village is set in a narrow dale that carries Hutton Beck northwards towards Guisborough.

== Demographics ==
In 1851 the Hutton Lowcross township had a population of 49, but by 1861 had risen to 271.

== History ==
The settlement of Hutton Lowcross is mentioned in the Domesday Book as belonging to Robert of Mortain, and having ten villagers and one priest. The name derives from the Old English Hō-tūn Loucros, meaning a spur of a hill and Loucros was a local name for an area of Guisborough, similar in name to Lowthorpe (another Yorkshire settlement) where the Low part is a personal name of someone from that area (Logi). The name of the settlement has been recorded with various spellings and spaces, with Hutton Low Cross being quite prominent in the late 19th century. Modern day Ordnance Survey mapping shows the settlement as Hutton Village (with a capital V), and the area that it is located in as Hutton Lowcross. In the 12th century, the village was known as Hoton, and later, when mining was a key industry, the village was also occasionally called Codhill, the same name as the ironstone mine in the area. Hutton Village is 2 miles (3.2 km) south-west of Guisborough, set in a narrow dale that carries the Hutton Beck northwards towards Guisborough and Skelton Beck.

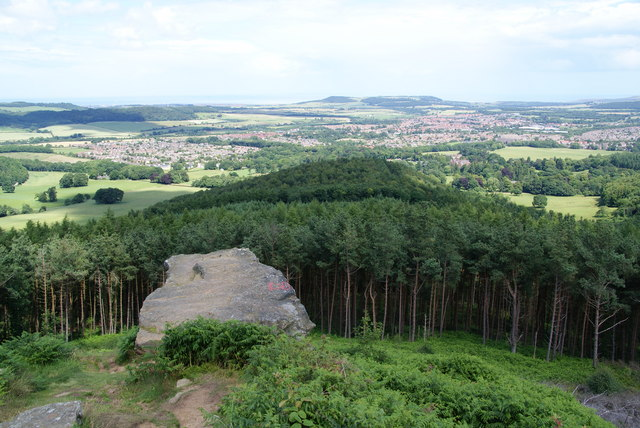
The Hanging Stone

A nunnery was founded at Hutton Lowcross in the middle of the 12th century; however, the nuns soon moved on to another site in Nunthorpe, further west. The area also had a leper hospital, the exact location of which is unknown, and it was lost before the Dissolution. In the woods behind the village is a large outcrop of sandstone known as the Hanging Stone. The name is thought to derive from its precarious position, rather than anyone being hanged there.

From the 1850s onwards, the area was part of the ironstone mining industry of Cleveland. A mine was situated to the south of the village, for which an inclined branch railway was built connecting with the Middlesbrough and Guisborough Railway between Hutton Gate and Pinchinthorpe stations. The inclined railway ran right through the middle of Hutton Village. Besides a seam of ironstone in the area, jet was also found to be in abundance to the south of the village. The jet found in and around Hutton Lowcross was considered to be of the highest quality, and examples can still be found in the waters of Hutton Beck.

In 1855, houses were built in what is now known as Hutton Village. These were mostly terraced houses, however, more housing was built in the early part of the 20th century just to the north of the village. The rise in population was due to the ironstone workings in the area, and this is reflected in the housing and population statistics which show that in 1851, 49 people lived in the Hutton Lowcross township, but by 1861, this had risen to 271. Similarly, the number of houses in 1851 was nine, but ten years later, the number of dwellings was 53. In 1864, Sir Joseph Pease employed Alfred Waterhouse to design Hutton Hall, a large country house to the north of the village. Hutton Gate railway station was built near the village in the 1850s. Originally it was a private station for the Pease family, but in 1904, it became a public station until its closure in 1964. The station site is now overgrown, with one platform still left over, and the railway trackbed is now a footpath.

Historically, the village was in the parish of Guisborough and the Wapentake of Langbaurgh. It is now in the civil parish of Guisborough, part of the Redcar and Cleveland unitary authority in North Yorkshire. The village comes under the Middlesbrough South and East Cleveland constituency at Westminster. The Hutton Lowcross area was awarded conservation area status in 2004, though this was awarded by the North York Moors National Park Authority, as the village and Hutton Hall lie just within the national park boundary. However, the village itself is not included due to the houses having "little architectural or historic value".

== Notable people ==
- Nigel Fossard, owned land at Hutton Lowcross
- Sir Joseph Pease, 1st Baronet, bought the estate at Hutton Lowcross (Hutton Hall) in 1867

== See also ==
- Pease baronets, designated as the Pease baronets, of Hutton Lowcross and Pinchinthorpe
