= Hutton (surname) =

This is a list of people with the surname Hutton.

== In arts and entertainment ==
- Barbara Hutton, American heiress and actress
- Betty Hutton, American actress
- Brian G. Hutton, American actor and director
- Caroline Amy Hutton (1861–1931), British archaeologist
- Danny Hutton (born 1942), Irish-American singer
- Deborah Hutton (Australian editor) (born 1961), Australian television personality
- Dorothy Hutton, British artist
- Edward Hutton (writer), British writer
- Ina Ray Hutton, American jazz age dancer and orchestra leader
- Jim Hutton, American actor
- June Hutton, American singer
- Lauren Hutton, American actress and model
- Laurence Hutton (1843–1904) American essayist and critic (actors)
- Lee Hutton (born 1987), English singer-songwriter, also member of band Industry
- Leona Hutton (1892–1949), American actress
- Marion Hutton, American actress and singer, sister of Betty Hutton
- Nedenia Marjorie Hutton, birth name of American actress Dina Merrill, daughter of Edward Francis Hutton
- Pascale Hutton, Canadian actress
- Peter Matthew Hutton, international sports executive
- Robert Hutton, actor
- Timothy Hutton, American actor, son of Jim Hutton
- Will Hutton (born 1950), British writer and commentator
- John Hutton, British artist

== In government, military, and politics ==
=== Britain/UK ===
- Brian Hutton, Baron Hutton (1932–2020), former British Law Lord, author of the Hutton Report
- Clayton Hutton, British intelligence officer
- Edward Hutton (army) (1848–1923), commander of Canadian and Australian military forces
- Fitzroy Hutton, British admiral
- Frederick Hutton (naval officer) (1801–1866), British naval officer
- John Hutton (politician), British Labour Party politician
- Sir Richard Hutton, the younger, 17th-century MP for Knaresborough and landowner
- Thomas Jacomb Hutton, British general

=== United States ===
- Bobby Hutton, Black Panther Party member
- Mark Hutton (politician) (born 1954), American politician
- May Hutton, American suffragist
- Wallace E. Hutton (born 1929), American politician from Maryland

=== Other countries ===
- Don Hutton, Yukon politician
- Drew Hutton, Australian politician
- Fred Hutton, Canadian politician
- George Hutton, Canadian politician
- Gilbert Hutton, Canadian politician
- Nigel Hutton, Australian politician
- Pierre Hutton (1928–2014), Australian diplomat

== In science and academia ==
- Charles Hutton, British mathematician
- Frederick Hutton (scientist) (1835–1905), New Zealand biologist and geologist
- James Hutton (1726–1797), Scottish geologist
- Jane Hutton, British statistician
- John Henry Hutton, anthropologist and Census Commissioner of the British Raj era
- Paul Andrew Hutton, American historian
- Richard Holt Hutton, English writer and theologian
- Ronald Hutton, British historian
- Rosemary Hutton, Scottish geophysicist
- Todd M. Hutton, American medical academic and psychiatrist

== In sport ==
=== Cricket ===
- Ben Hutton, English cricketer
- George Hutton, Scottish cricketer
- Len Hutton, English cricketer
- Maurice Hutton (1903–1940), Australian cricketer
- Percy Hutton, Australian cricketer
- Richard Anthony Hutton, English cricketer

=== Football ===
- Alan Hutton, Scottish footballer
- David Hutton (Scottish footballer) (born 1985), Scottish football goalkeeper for Clyde
- David Hutton (Irish footballer) (born 1989), English football midfielder for Cheltenham Town
- Claire Hutton, American soccer player

=== Other sports ===
- Alfred Hutton, English fencer
- Jack Hutton, American football player
- Ben Hutton, ice hockey defenceman for the Vegas Golden Knights
- Bouse Hutton, Canadian hockey player
- Carter Hutton, former ice hockey goaltender
- Mark Hutton, Australian baseball player
- Bill Hutton, Canadian hockey player

== In other fields ==
- Edward Francis Hutton, American financier
- Frederick Remsen Hutton, American engineer
- Matthew Hutton (archbishop of York), 16th/17th-century
- Matthew Hutton (archbishop of Canterbury), 18th-century
- Sir Richard Hutton, 17th-century English lawyer and landowner

== See also ==
- Hutton (disambiguation)
- Hatton (disambiguation)
