= Tim Canova =

American law professor (born 1960)

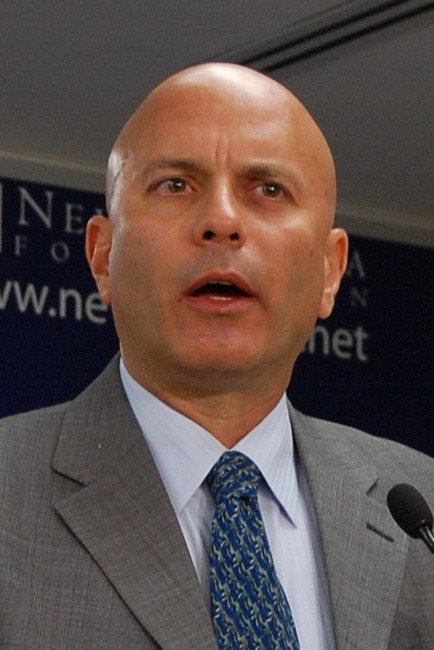
- Born: Merrick, New York, U.S.
- Education: Franklin & Marshall College (BA); Georgetown University (JD); Stockholm University (MA)
- Political party: Republican (2024–present)
- Other political affiliations: Democratic (before 2018); Independent (2018–2024)

Timothy A. Canova is an American politician and law professor specializing in banking and finance. Canova was a candidate for Florida's 23rd congressional district, unsuccessfully challenging Debbie Wasserman Schultz in the 2016 Democratic primary, and again in the 2018 general election, where he ran as an independent candidate. He later supported President Donald Trump in the 2020 presidential election.

== Early life and education ==
Canova was born and raised in Merrick, New York on Long Island. He earned a Bachelor of Arts degree from Franklin & Marshall College, Juris Doctor from the Georgetown University Law Center, and also spent time as a visiting scholar at Stockholm University.

== Career ==
=== Academics ===
Canova is a professor of Law and Public Finance at Nova Southeastern University's Shepard Broad College of Law. He previously held an endowed professorship as the inaugural Betty Hutton Williams Professor of International Economic Law at the Chapman University School of Law. He taught as a visiting law professor at the University of Miami School of Law, and the St. Thomas University School of Law. Before becoming a Florida resident, he was granted accelerated tenure as a law professor at the University of New Mexico School of Law. Prior to that he was a visiting law professor at the University of Arizona College of Law.

He has published articles in Dissent and The American Prospect criticizing the US Federal Reserve.

Canova has practiced law in New York City with the international law firms of Gibson, Dunn & Crutcher and Mudge Rose Guthrie Alexander & Ferdon.

=== Politics ===
In the 1980s, Canova served as an aide to U.S. Senator Paul Tsongas. In 1995, he became the executive director of the National Jobs for All Coalition. During the 1990s, he criticized the policies of the Federal Reserve Bank under Alan Greenspan, warning that "corporate earnings could fall too far to sustain the current stock prices" and lead to an economic bubble-burst.

In October 2011, he was appointed by U.S. Senator Bernie Sanders to an advisory committee on Federal Reserve reform. The committee's work focused on potential paths to restructuring the Fed and tightening rules on conflicts of interest. Canova vocally supported the efforts to pass the amendment to the 2009 Dodd-Frank bill authored by former Congressman Ron Paul, (R-TX) and Representative Alan Grayson, (D-FL) that would have mandated auditing of emergency spending by the Federal Reserve.

In a 2016 interview with Glenn Greenwald, Canova said, "When I was a professor at the University of New Mexico, I threw myself into a grassroots campaign to get rid of felony disenfranchisement, and it was one of the great grassroots movements I’ve ever been involved in." The resulting legislation was passed within two months by the New Mexico Legislature and signed into law by then-governor Gary Johnson.

After Canova lost the Democratic primary in 2016, he formed "Progress for All" to organize support for numerous issues, including the fight against the Sabal Trail Transmission Pipeline.

==== 2016 Congressional campaign ====
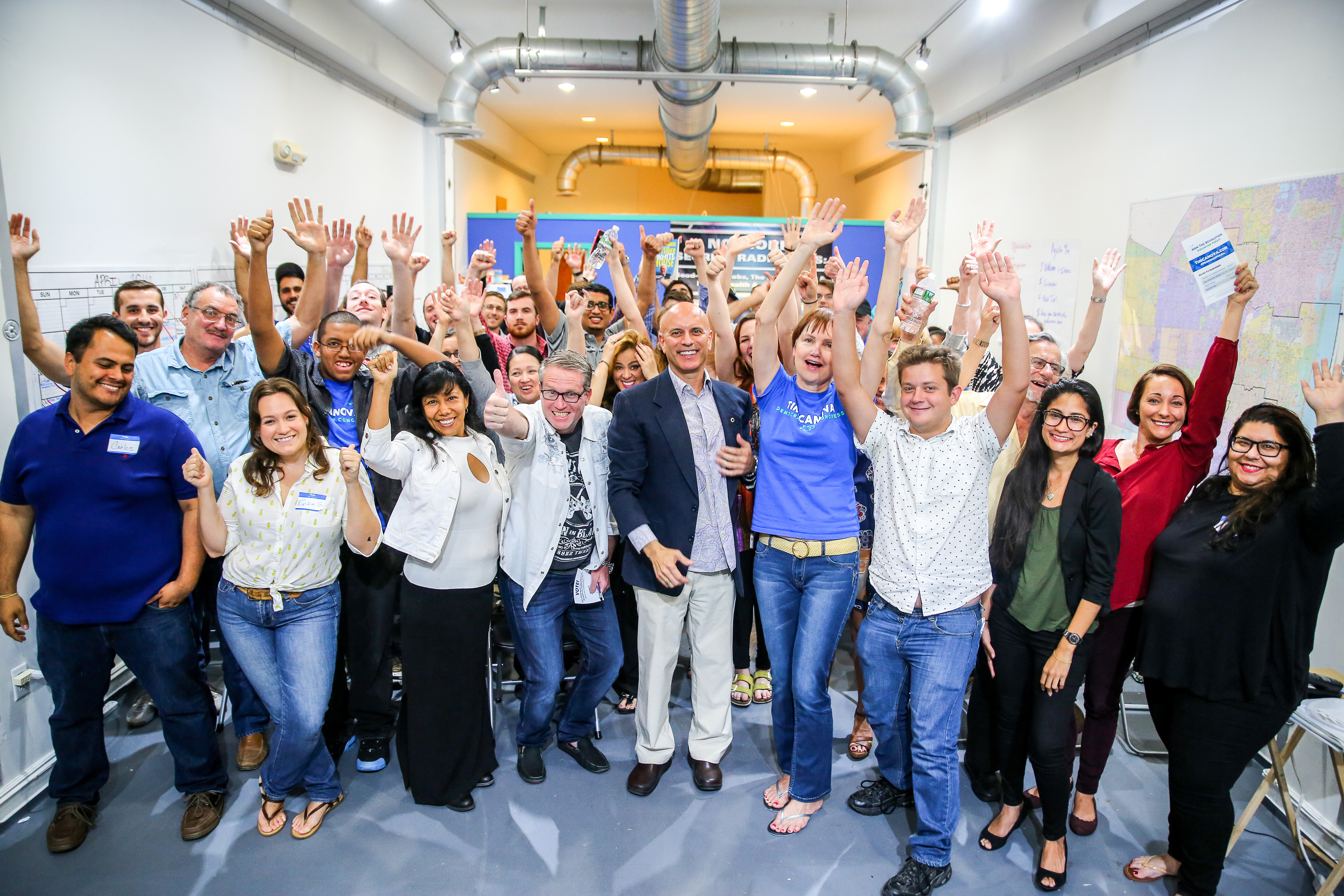
Canova with supporters

Canova decided to run against incumbent former Democratic National Committee chair, Representative Debbie Wasserman Schultz in the 2016 Florida Democratic Party's primary election after getting what he considered a "brush off" from her staff in 2015.

Canova's challenge to Wasserman Schultz focused on her legislative record. According to FloridaPolitics.com, he criticized Wasserman Schultz for "voting to give the president trade promotion authority, a move Canova said will destroy U.S. jobs by sending them overseas; supporting a bill that would block tougher regulations of short-term, high-interest-rate 'payday' loans, which he said prey on the poor; and opposing Florida's 2014 medical marijuana ballot initiative, a measure that nearly won the required 60 percent approval to become law."

On issues of Florida specifically, Canova rejected Wasserman Schultz's opposition to a medical marijuana ballot measure that, according to polls, had the support of 58 percent of Florida voters.

The Florida Democratic party initially refused access to its voter database to the Canova campaign. Following complaints by the Florida Progressive Democratic Caucus and the Canova campaign, the Florida Democratic party leadership, in March 2016, reversed its position. However, Florida Democratic Party executive director Scott Arceneaux specified that the exception would only apply to the contest between Canova and Wasserman Schultz, because of "the truly unique factors." Canova commented, "I hate to be critical at a moment when I am thankful, but I think that is bad policy."

On May 21, 2016, Vermont Senator Bernie Sanders endorsed Canova, telling CNN's Jake Tapper "Clearly, I favor [Wasserman Schultz's] opponent."

Canova accused Wasserman Schultz of taking corporate money, citing his large base of small-dollar donors. In a fundraising email the Wasserman-Schultz campaign argued that, despite Canova's many donors, "90% of his cash is flowing in from donors outside of Florida." Of the 10% of his donations that come from within Florida, Canova was unable to disclose what fraction came from within the 23rd District.

On August 30, Canova lost the Congressional primary election with 43.2% of the vote to Wasserman Schultz's 56.8%. This outcome was similar to that predicted by pre-election polling.

==== 2016 DNC leaks and the Canova campaign ====
After WikiLeaks released leaked Democratic National Committee emails in July 2016, Canova stated that he had searched their database and found his name mentioned in about 70 emails. On August 8, 2016, Canova's campaign announced that they were filing a complaint with the Federal Election Commission, accusing Wasserman Schultz of "us[ing] her position with the DNC and the resources of the DNC to improperly benefit her congressional campaign."

==== 2018 campaign ====
On June 15, 2017, Canova announced that he was entering the primary for the 2018 Democratic nomination in Florida's 23rd congressional district.

At the June 15 press conference announcing Canova's candidacy, reporters questioned him about a video he had posted on his Facebook page in January 2017, in which he said that Seth Rich "may have been the WikiLeaks source of the leaked DNC emails. He was gunned down, assassinated under suspicious circumstances just days after publication of those leaked emails." When the reporters asked Canova whether he suspected the DNC was involved in Rich's death, he answered, "I have no idea. I wondered what the DNC under Wasserman Schultz was capable of, but I don't know." He removed the Facebook post later that day.

On April 2, 2018, Canova announced that he would be withdrawing from the contest for the Democratic nomination and would instead be challenging Wasserman Schultz in the general election as an independent candidate. Canova received 4.9 percent of the vote in his second attempt to oust Wasserman Schultz.

Canova told reporters, however, that he had in fact received more votes than Wasserman Schultz both in 2016 and in 2018, based on reports he heard from his own campaign workers. He requested that the 2018 election be set aside in favor of a new election in which all ballots would be counted by hand.

==== 2020 presidential election commentary ====
In a September 24, 2020 interview with The Floridian, Canova stated that "There is no way I can vote for Joe Biden," praising President Donald Trump's foreign policy and his apparent push to end the independence of the Federal Reserve. Canova added that he would be willing to work with the Trump Administration in the future.
