= Roseberry Mine =

Former ironstone mine in North Yorkshire, England

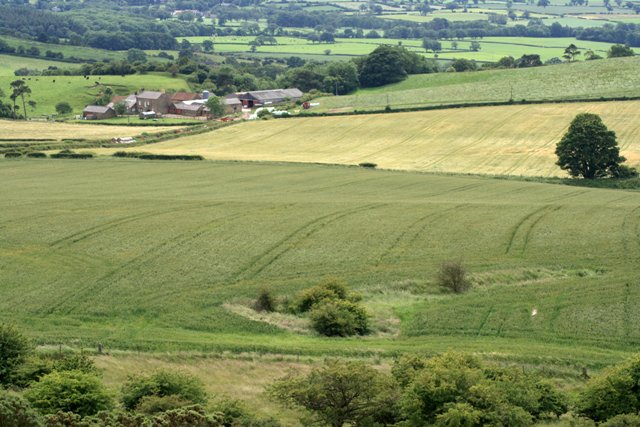
- Mining Subsidence, Roseberry Mine

- Location within North Yorkshire
- Location: Great Ayton, North Yorkshire, England; 54.502°N 1.100°W
- Products: Ironstone
- Production: 204,000 tonnes (225,000 tons)
- Financial year: 1917
- Type: Drift
- Opened: 1870
- Active: 1874–1883; 1907–1924
- Closed: 1924
- Company: See list

Roseberry Mine was an ironstone mine in the North Riding of Yorkshire, England, which operated between 1883 and 1924, with a break of 24 years. Both periods of mining used a form of tramway to transport the ironstone out, which connected with the railway line north of Great Ayton railway station. The mine was located on the south side of Roseberry Topping digging into the hillside. Of the three ironstone mines in the Great Ayton area, Roseberry was the largest.

In 1912, the northern slope of Roseberry Topping collapsed and slipped down the hill which has left it with a distinctive shape (it was conically shaped before the landslide). Originally, the ironstone mining was blamed, but modern investigations had concluded that extreme weather events were the cause.

== History ==
Roseberry Ironstone Mine was on the south side of Roseberry Topping, some 8 miles (13 km) south east of Middlesbrough, 1.6 miles (2.5 km) north east of Great Ayton and 0.93 miles (1.5 km) south of Newton-under Roseberry. The Norton Iron Company developed the mine from 1870, but the proceedings were very slow, so much so that the royalty owner took the company to court as they should have been producing over 500 tonnes (550 tons) a day. The company was fined £689 for loss of earnings to the royalty owner. Part of the reason for the poor returns, was the lack of transportation for the mined ore. It had been recognised that the proximity of the mine to the Great Ayton railway branch line, should have made it easy to export the ironstone, however, the tramway connection was not finished until early 1880. The engine used on the tramway was an 0-4-0ST named Roseberry, and built by Black, Hawthorn & Co. in Gateshead in 1880. It was used for ten years before being sold and used on reservoir construction in County Durham.

Like the Warren Moor Mine across the valley near Kildale, the iron content at Roseberry was only 26–28%, in a seam that was 5 feet 5 inches (1.65 m) thick. However, as the mine was driven into the hillside, and the miners were effectively digging upwards, the mine was self-draining for its water ingress and tubs carrying the mined ore could be moved to the surface under their own gravity. This also meant that the surface operations covered a smaller area.

In 1910, productivity at the mine was good and the output of ironstone amounted to three trainloads per day. In May 1912, the northern slope of Roseberry Topping slipped and caused a landfall event. This was blamed on the ironstone mining that had resumed underneath the hill, as well exploratory workings on the northern slope and old jet workings. Modern geological investigations believe that the softer sandstones underneath the hill would have failed anyway, bringer the harder sandstone cap rumbling down, but the mining has probably had some effect.

In 1911, an influx of workers from Cornwall and Norfolk appeared in the census. This was put down to the closure of tin mines in the south west and the loss of agricultural jobs in East Anglia. Besides ironstone, the area around Great Ayton was noted for its whinstone quarrying. In 1917, the mine achieved its best output of 204,000 tonnes (225,000 tons) and employed over 380 workers, making it the largest of the three mines in the Great Ayton area (the other two mines being Ayton Banks and Monument). Between 1907 and closure in 1924, the output of the mine (and that of Ayton Banks), was used in the Lackenby smelters of the Tees Furnace Company. During the First World War, Roseberry was dispatching three trainloads of ore a day to Teesside.

Mining ceased in 1924, but a small team was retained at the site to undertake "routine maintenance". The Gribdale Mining Co. took over the site in 1925, but no mining took place and closure plans were announced in 1929. The machinery was cleared from the site in 1931.

=== Owners ===
During its 41-year history, the mine was operated by six different owners;

- 1871–1875 Norton Iron Company
- 1875–1882 Roseberry Ironstone Company
- 1882–1887 Stevenson, Jacques and Company
- 1906–1921 Tees Furnace Company
- 1922–1925 Burton and Sons
- 1925–1926 Gribdale Mining Company
