= Hutton Junction railway station =

Disused railway station in Guisborough, North Yorkshire

Hutton Junction

General information
- Location: Guisborough, North Riding of Yorkshire; England
- Coordinates: 54.5293°N 1.0574°W
- Grid reference: NZ611153
- Platforms: 1

Other information
- Status: Disused

History
- Original company: North Eastern Railway
- Pre-grouping: North Eastern Railway

Key dates
- 1 November 1878: Opened
- April 1891: Closed
Location

Hutton Junction railway station served the town of Guisborough, in the historical county of North Riding of Yorkshire, England, from 1878 to 1891 on the Middlesbrough and Guisborough Railway.

== History ==
The station was opened on 1 November 1878 by the North Eastern Railway. It was reduced to one train a day in July 1885. Trains had to reverse from here to get to Guisborough. The station closed in April 1891.

Preceding station	Disused railways	Following station
Hutton Gate; Line and station closed	North Eastern Railway; Middlesbrough and Guisborough Railway	Guisborough; Line and station closed
