= North Skelton =

Village in Redcar and Cleveland, England

Coordinates: 54.557°N 0.985°W

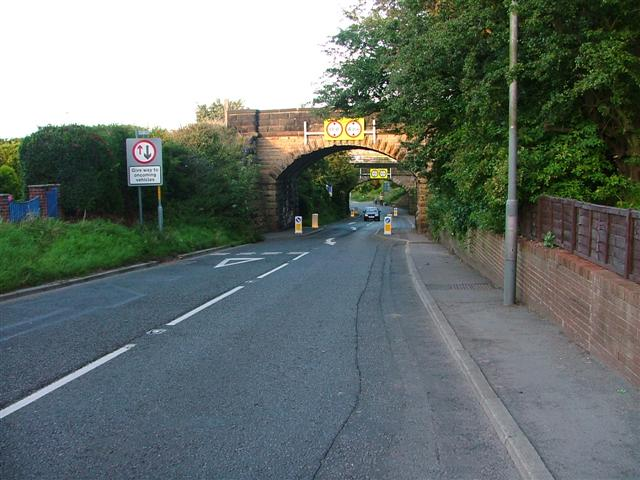
- Double Bridge, the first bridge is disused, the second carries the freight line from Boulby Mine

- Location within North Yorkshire
- OS grid reference: NZ674185
- Civil parish: Skelton and Brotton
- Unitary authority: Redcar and Cleveland
- Ceremonial county: North Yorkshire
- Region: North East
- Country: England
- Sovereign state: United Kingdom

North Skelton is a village in Redcar and Cleveland, North Yorkshire, England.

The village is 1 mile (2 km) south of Skelton-in-Cleveland, and just south of the A174 road between Thornaby and Whitby. North Skelton experienced a boom in the 1870s when North Skelton Mine opened. The mine was the deepest of all of the Cleveland Ironstone workings and its shaft extended to over 720 feet (220 m) in depth. The mine produced over 25,000,000 tonnes (28,000,000 tons) of iron ore between its opening in 1872 and its closure in 1964.

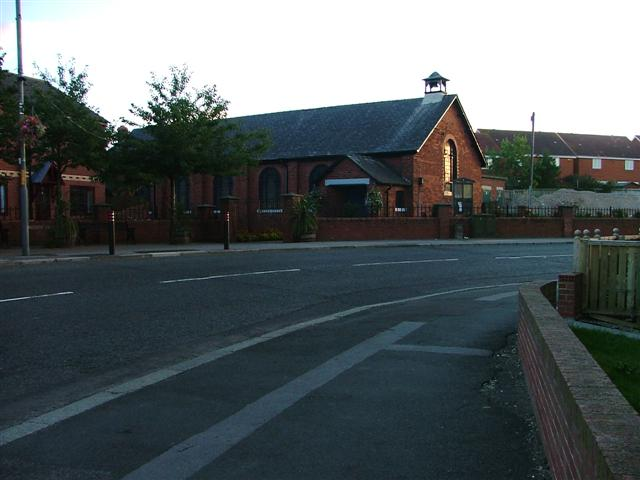
St Peter's Church

North Skelton railway station was on the line between Teesside and Whitby West Cliff. It opened in 1902 and closed in 1951. The line is still open to carry freight from Skinningrove Steelworks and Boulby Mine.

North Skelton lends its name to an English Long Sword Dance performed in the area.
