= Hutton Gate railway station =

Disused railway station in North Yorkshire, England

Hutton Gate
- Hutton Gate railway station, March 1963, viewed from near the level crossing. Hutton Hall lies to the right, and The Avenue (which connects to the Guisborough-Pinchinthorpe road) to the left.

General information
- Location: Guisborough, Redcar and Cleveland; England
- Coordinates: 54.5248°N 1.0765°W
- Grid reference: NZ598147
- Platforms: 2

Other information
- Status: Disused

History
- Original company: Middlesbrough and Guisborough Railway
- Pre-grouping: North Eastern Railway
- Post-grouping: London and North Eastern Railway

Key dates
- 25 February 1854: Station opened
- May 1864: Closed
- July 1881: Reopened
- 1 October 1903: Closed
- 1 January 1904: Reopened
- 2 March 1964: Closed
Location

Hutton Gate was a railway station on the Middlesbrough and Guisborough Railway. It was opened on 25 February 1854 and closed along with the entire Nunthorpe-Guisborough branch on 2 March 1964. The station stands on Hutton Lane, just east of its junction with The Avenue.

Originally, the station was exclusively for the use of the Pease family at the nearby Hutton Hall; the family owned the major iron ore mines in the region at the time and the railway line was designed to service these mines. Although a private station, excursion traffic was allowed to detrain at Hutton Gate, such as Liberal Association specials from Thornaby in the 1890s. These were run for a speaking event held in a marquee on the lawn outside Hutton Hall.

The station was closed between May 1864 and July 1881, and then again from October 1903 to January 1904. It was purchased from the Pease family by the North Eastern Railway (NER) in 1904, and opened for public use. It served Hutton Village and, later, the Guisborough suburb of Hutton Lowcross. The station had its staffing withdrawn in 1961, and was listed for closure in March 1963. Full closure to all traffic came in March 1964.

Following the branch's closure, the track was removed but the station remains intact and is now a private house. The modern road Pease Court begins where the station's level crossing once gave access to Hutton Hall.

== Accident ==
On 15 February 1900, a train ran into a snow drift to the east of the station, and whilst its crew were trying to release it, another train travelling in the same direction crashed into the rear of it. The guard of the first train, who was trying to release the carriages from the engine, was fatally injured, and some passengers on board both trains were injured. The inquiry found that the bad weather and lack of visibility was largely to blame, however, the train crew were also criticised for not having protected their train properly when it became stuck.

| Preceding station | Disused railways | Following station |
|---|---|---|
| Pinchinthorpe; Line and station closed | North Eastern Railway; Middlesbrough & Guisborough Railway | Hutton Junction; Line and station closed |
