= Pinchinthorpe railway station =

Disused railway station in North Yorkshire, England

Pinchinthorpe
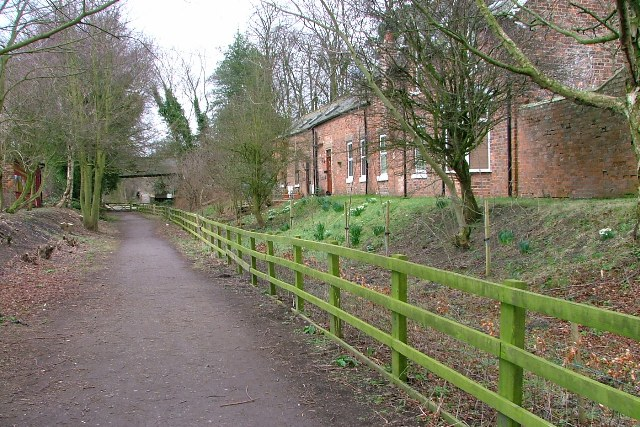
- Former Pinchinthorpe railway station (used 1877–1951)

General information
- Location: Pinchinthorpe, Redcar and Cleveland; England
- Coordinates: 54.528900°N 1.100700°W
- Grid reference: NZ582152
- Platforms: 1 (first station); 2 (second station)

Other information
- Status: Disused

History
- Original company: Middlesbrough and Guisborough Railway
- Pre-grouping: North Eastern Railway
- Post-grouping: London and North Eastern Railway

Key dates
- 1854: Opened (first station)
- 1877: Opened (second station)
- 1951: Station closed
- 1964: Branch line closed
Location

Pinchinthorpe railway station was a railway station on the Middlesbrough and Guisborough Railway (M&GR). It was opened on 25 February 1854 and closed in 1951, thirteen years before the rest of the Nunthorpe–Guisborough branch. It served the village of Pinchinthorpe in North Yorkshire, England, a few miles west of Guisborough railway station.

== History ==
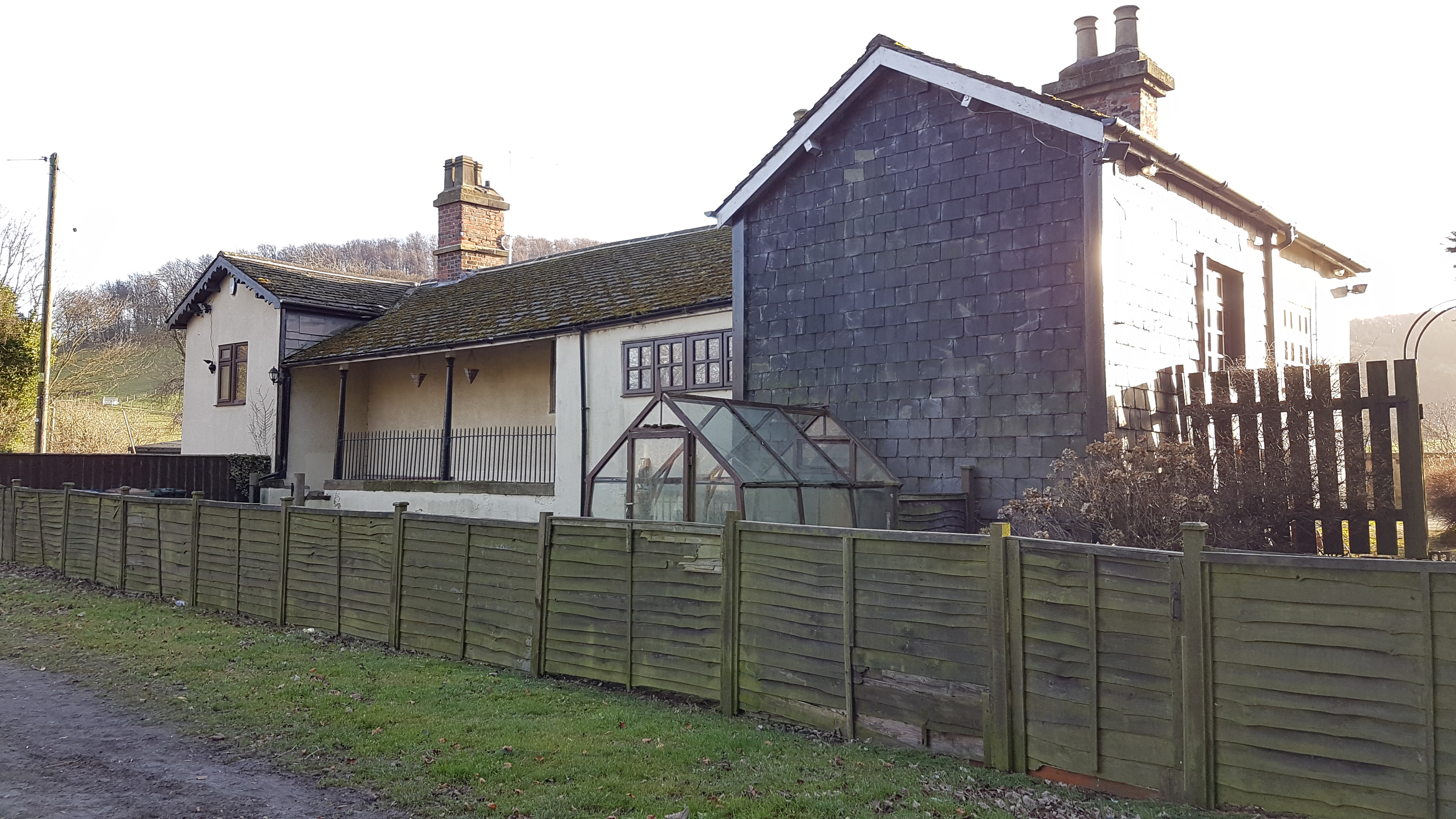
The original Pinchinthorpe railway station, used between 1854 and 1877

Two station buildings were constructed on either side of the bridge that still carries the Guisborough–Great Ayton road over the former railway line. The first station, on the east side of the bridge, was built in 1854 by the M&GR; it has been since converted into cottages.

After the North Eastern Railway (NER) purchased the M&GR in 1863–65, it substantially increased the amount of traffic on the line and doubled the track to Guisborough. To accommodate the increased traffic, the present bridge was constructed in 1876 to replace an earlier level crossing. The NER also built a new and much larger station in 1877 on the west side of the new bridge.

Designed by William Peachey, the company's resident architect, the station consisted of a stationmaster's house, porter's lodge, ticket office, toilets, and two waiting rooms. It had two side platforms, replacing the single platform of the original station. Although built inexpensively and without much refinement, it was an improvement on the NER directors' original vision of leaving the stationmaster to continue living in the old station as an economy measure. A similar design to Pinchinthorpe station was used by Peachey at Evenwood railway station in County Durham, which also survives (albeit likewise long closed).

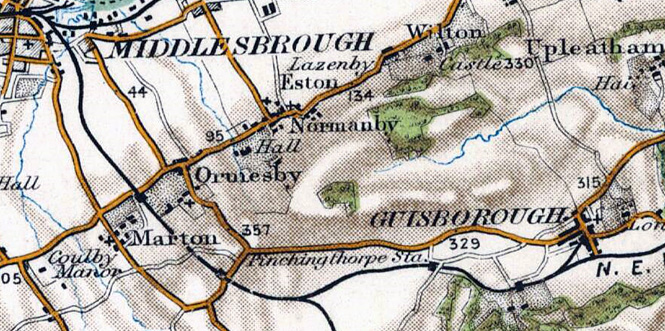
1902 map of the route of the Middlesbrough and Guisborough Railway, showing Pinchinthorpe Station

Passenger services on what was originally primarily a mineral railway serving the local mines were initially minimal, consisting of only one train between Guisborough and Middlesbrough a day, but by the 1930s up to eleven trains ran daily. In 1920, the station was renamed from Pinchingthorpe, by then a deprecated spelling, to Pinchinthorpe. The passenger and goods services were withdrawn on 21 October 1951 and the station was closed. It was subsequently converted and remains in use as private accommodation. The Guisborough line closed in 1964 under the Beeching Axe and the track was pulled up, though the trackbed continued to be owned by British Rail until 1989.

In 1984, the then Cleveland County Council obtained a licence from BR to reopen three miles (5 km) of the trackbed as a walkway and bridleway. It purchased the trackbed five years later and resurfaced it, also building a number of ponds and wetlands near the first Pinchinthorpe station. The trackbed continues in use as a public trail and nature reserve. A small café and visitor centre was built in 1986 near the original station on the site of the old coal yard, evidence of which can still be seen in the adjoining car park.

Preceding station	Disused railways	Following station
Nunthorpe	Middlesbrough & Guisborough Railway	Hutton Gate
