= George Hutton (cricketer) =

Scottish cricketer

Personal information
- Full name: George Hutton
- Born: 20 August 1942 (age 84); Paisley, Renfrewshire, Scotland
- Batting: Right-handed
- Bowling: Right-arm fast-medium

Domestic team information
- Years: Team
- 1966–1967: Scotland

Career statistics
Competition	First-class
Matches	2
Runs scored	0
Batting average	0.00
100s/50s	–/–
Top score	0*
Balls bowled	126
Wickets	2
Bowling average	28.00
5 wickets in innings	–
10 wickets in match	–
Best bowling	2/16
Catches/stumpings	1/–
- Source: Cricinfo, 3 November 2022

George Hutton (born 20 August 1942) is a Scottish former first-class cricketer.

Hutton was born at Paisley in August 1942, where he was educated at the John Neilson Institution. A club cricketer for Kelburne, he made two appearances in first-class cricket for Scotland against Cambridge University at Fenner's on Scotland's 1966 tour of England, and Lancashire at Old Trafford on their 1967 tour of England. He took 2 wickets in these matches, but failed to score any runs. In addition to playing at first-class level, he scored in a first-class match between Scotland and Warwickshire in 1967. Outside of cricket, Hutton was a police officer.
