= Pinchinthorpe =

Hamlet in North Yorkshire, England

Coordinates: 54.5289°N 1.1000°W

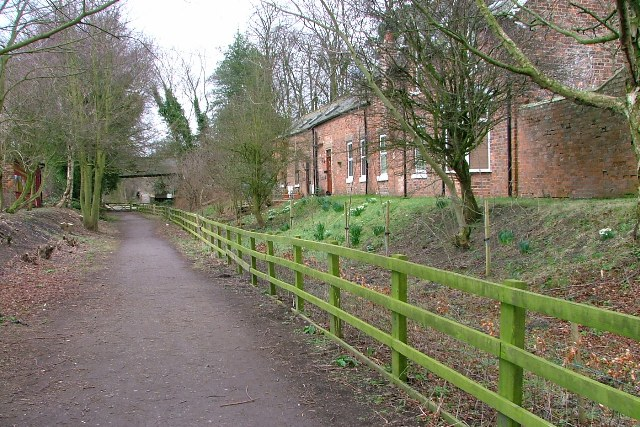
- Former station buildings at Pinchinthorpe, now a private residence, the station closed in 1951 and the railway line was removed as a result of the "Beeching Axe"

- Location within North Yorkshire
- OS grid reference: NZ582152
- Civil parish: Guisborough
- Unitary authority: Redcar and Cleveland
- Ceremonial county: North Yorkshire
- Region: North East
- Country: England
- Sovereign state: United Kingdom
- Post town: Guisborough
- Postcode district: TS14
- Police: Cleveland
- Fire: Cleveland
- Ambulance: North East

Pinchinthorpe is a small hamlet in the civil parish of Guisborough, in the Redcar and Cleveland district of North Yorkshire, England. It is a linear settlement spread along the A173. The postcode is TS14 8HE.

Until 1951, Pinchinthorpe had a working railway station, on the line from Middlesbrough to Guisborough. The village has four bus stops, two of which are not near any housing.

Pinchinthorpe is the starting point for the Guisborough Forest Walkway.

Pinchinthorpe Hall was the home of a microbrewery; "The North Yorkshire Brewery" and bottling plant for mineral water.

There is a spring supply for mains water from the nearby hills, meaning that there is no water rate payable by the residents.

Pinchingthorpe was formerly a township in the parish of Guisbrough, in 1866 Pinchinthorpe became a separate civil parish, in 1894 it became part of Guisborough Rural District, in 1932 it became part of Guisborough Urban District. On 1 April 1974 the parish was abolished became part of Guisborough successor parish. In 1951 the parish had a population of 54. Until 1974 it was in the North Riding of Yorkshire. From 1974 to 1996 it was in the county of Cleveland.
