= Warren Moor Mine =

Former ironstone mine in North Yorkshire, England

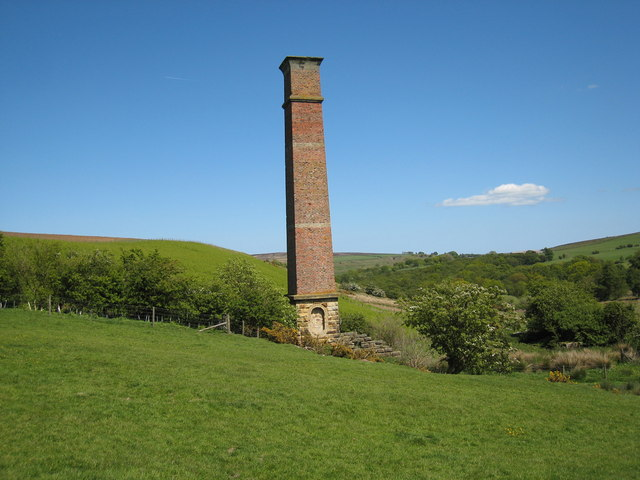
- Chimney at Warren Moor Mine

- Location within North Yorkshire
- Location: Kildale, North Yorkshire, England; 54.471°N 1.037°W
- Opened: 1866
- Closed: 1874

The Warren Moor Mine, was a short-lived mining concern south of Kildale, North Yorkshire, England. Activity at the site was limited to drift mining, and although shafts were sunk to mine the underground schemes, these ventures failed. The site of the workings have been stabilised, and the old chimney is the only Victorian ironstone mining chimney left in the United Kingdom.

The site was made safe in the 2010s to allow public access.

== History ==
Warren Moor is 0.93 miles (1.5 km) south east of Kildale, near the head of the River Leven and 700 feet (210 m) above sea level. The mine was developed despite the poor quality of the ironstone; the actual content of iron in the stone was 26%, relatively low compared with nearby Rosedale which averaged nearly 50% iron content. Having been surveyed in 1857 with several boreholes drilled, the proposers, the Bell Brothers, declined to open the site, however, a railway to export the ironstone was built that connected to what is now the Esk Valley Line. Between 1864 and 1874, two companies tried to exploit the iron and both ventures failed. John Watson and partners took out a 42-year lease in 1866, but poor returns meant by 1867, the venture was in trouble and by June 1868, the Kildale Estate had re-acquired the land.

In 1872, a second concern, the Leven Vale Company, took over running the site and installed the miners' housing. A letter to the Kildale Estate showed the company had an intent to build more housing on the site, but a slump in iron prices in 1873, resulted in the company going into liquidation in August 1874. The cottages were demolished in 1927, with the stone being used in the rebuilding of Kildale village hall. A further 19 boreholes were drilled in 1913, which confirmed iron content at 26% and a bed of ironstone that was 5 feet 1 inch (1.55 m) thick, split in the middle by a band of shale that was 1 foot 8 inches (0.51 m) wide.

The former mine workings are known to have polluted the River Leven, which flows near to the site.

=== Warren Moor Chimney ===
The 64-foot (20 m) high chimney was built between 1856 and 1857, but was never used, and has been described as "standing as a monument to the failed venture". The chimney is the only one left in the United Kingdom that was associated with ironstone mining in the Victorian era. The structure is constructed of bricks and is grade II listed. The base of the chimney, which is 17 feet 6 inches (5.33 m) high, is constructed of sandstone blocks, with an oval opening in all sides faced with white firebricks. The rest of the chimney is constructed of red bricks with thin courses of firebricks and a sandstone top.

== Access ==
The site was remediated and made safe throughout the 2010s. One of the reasons that the site was easy to preserve was that it was abandoned early in the ventures and just left rather than being demolished after use. Besides the chimney, the site has the remains of mineshaft, boiler and pump houses and the trackbed leading eastwards.
