= North Skelton Mine =

Disused ironstone mine in Cleveland, England

- Location within Redcar and Cleveland
- Location: North Skelton, North Yorkshire, England; 54.5546°N 0.9589°W
- Products: Ironstone
- Production: 6,000,000 tonnes (6,600,000 tons)
- Financial year: 1920
- Type: Mine
- Greatest depth: 720 feet (220 m)
- Discovered: 1865
- Opened: 1872
- Closed: 1964
- Company: Bolckow, Vaughan & Co (1872–1929); Dorman, Long & Co (1929–1964)

North Skelton Mine was an ironstone mine in the village of North Skelton in North Yorkshire, England. (Note: The site was located in the historic county of the North Riding of Yorkshire. The site is now in the Borough of Redcar and Cleveland.) The mine was the deepest of the ironstone mines in Cleveland and was also the last to close, which came in January 1964. Some buildings still exist on the surface as well as spoil heaps.

Due to the mine being developed further north, the name of North Skelton Mine stuck, even when it was moved south east of Skelton village.

== History ==
During the rush to extract iron for the smelters of Middlesbrough, North Skelton was developed in 1865. Land was leased from Squire Wharton, the owner of Skelton Castle. The location of the ironstone seam at Skelton was 390 feet (120 m) below sea level, and so a great deal or preparation work was undertaken to ready the site before mining could begin. Originally the site was developed nearer to the settlement of Marske, but as a greater density of ironstone was found elsewhere, the shaft was sunk further south, but the original name of North Skelton stuck, which is why the mine site lies to the south east of the village of Skelton. The mine was commissioned in 1872, after some difficulty and expense in sinking the shafts to over 700-foot (210 m). Additionally, the means to transport the ironstone out of the mine rested upon the North Eastern Railway providing a rail link to the mine site. This involved the spanning of Skelton Beck near Marske, which was achieved by the building of Saltburn Viaduct, which was 783 feet (239 m) long and 150 feet (46 m) high.

As the site of the mineshaft was remote from the nearest villages, a new settlement was created (North Skelton). The company (Bolckow, Vaughan & Co), built 236 houses at a cost of £80 each in 1871. The main shaft of the mine went down as far as 720 feet (220 m), (Note: Accounts vary as to the depth of the main shaft. Most sources state 720 feet (220 m), but some sources state 740 feet (230 m).) which was 400 feet (120 m) below sea level. The amount of water increased with the depth, so much so that at 384-foot (117 m) down, the pumps were having to deal with over 3,000 imperial gallons (14,000 L; 3,600 US gal) per minute. To combat this water and because of possible flooding, the mine was equipped with three turbines capable of moving 1,000 imperial gallons (4,500 L; 1,200 US gal) per minute.

In 1880, production at the mine reached 247,735 tonnes (273,081 tons), but later in the decade, the ironstone mines across Cleveland suffered a drop in productivity which was connected with a downturn in the iron and steel markets. At North Skelton, some miners left Cleveland to go and work in mines in America.

From 1954, iron was also sourced underground from the remnants of the Lumpsey Mine, but was brought to the surface at North Skelton.

The mine was most productive between 1875 and 1920, when the average mined in a year was 6,000,000 tonnes (6,600,000 tons). Records show that in 1910, North Skelton was forwarding four full freight trains per day to the smelters on south Teesside. In 1929, the assets of Bolckow, Vaughan and Co, were acquired by Dorman, Long & Co. The second owners held the mine until January 1964, when it was closed. After closure, the site was used for various above-ground industrial concerns.

Between 1876 and 1949, 36 men died in the mine through various accidents such as crushing injuries, roof falls, explosions and limbs being removed by passing trains. There were even recorded instances of boys dying after they had trespassed on the site.
