= Hutton Roof =

Hutton Roof may refer to:

- Hutton Roof, Mungrisdale, a hamlet and former civil parish in Cumbria, England
- Hutton Roof, Kirkby Lonsdale, a village and civil parish near Kirkby Lonsdale, Cumbria, England
