= Hutton Companies =

American real estate developer

- Type: Private
- Industry: Real Estate Development
- Founded: Santa Ana, CA, U.S. (1977; 49 years ago)
- Founder: Harold and Betty Hutton|Betty Hutton
- Headquarters: Anaheim, California, United States
- Area served: Southern California
- Products: Mixed-Use Development, multi-family residential, Government, Office, Retail Centers
- Services: Development, Construction, Property Management
- Divisions: Hutton Development Company; Hutton Construction; Hutton Management Services
- Website: huttoncompanies.com

Hutton Companies is a Southern California real estate developer, based in Anaheim, California, United States. Founded in 1977, the Hutton Companies build mixed-use, government, multi-family residential, office, retail and light industrial properties. Hutton Companies and its affiliates have owned, developed and managed a portfolio of more than 3,800,000 square feet (350,000 m^{2}) of commercial real estate and 2,400 units of multi-family residential in Southern California.

Collectively, Hutton Development Company, Hutton Management Services, and Hutton Construction make up the Hutton Companies, representing the three H's in the companies' corporate logo.

As of May 2009, Hutton Development Company ranked as the 8th largest commercial developer in California by the California Real Estate Journal's list of "California's 2009 Leading Commercial Developers" (ranked by total square footage of properties under development as of Jan.1, 2009). At the time of publish, Hutton had 500,000 square feet (46,000 m^{2}) of the companies' mixed-use master-planned community (Upland, California) under construction, totaling $152,000,000 in market value.

== History ==
The Hutton Companies were founded by the late Mrs. Betty Hutton after the death of her husband, legendary entrepreneur and chemist, Harold Hutton in 1977. In 1939, the Huttons founded Refining Associates, a chemical engineering firm making special lubricants and fuels. Together, the Huttons developed oil fields throughout South East Asia after the Second World War and worked closely with Pertamina, the national oil company of Indonesia. After Harold's unexpected death in 1975 in Indonesia, Mrs. Hutton liquidated her international oil interests and returned home to Villa Park, CA, in Orange County, California.

During the late 1970s, Hutton was primarily a venture capitalist and private equity partner in numerous real estate developments throughout the state of California. By the end of the 1970s, Hutton had evolved into a full service real estate development company and land owner.

In 1985, Mrs. Hutton retired from Hutton Companies to pursue her philanthropic work with her non-profit foundation. Today, the Hutton Foundation has approximately $100,000,000 in endowment and donates millions annually to the arts, health care, education, and civic causes.

=== Philanthropy ===
Mrs. Hutton was a generous benefactor of education and children causes. Chapman University has recognized Hutton's generosity by naming several of its facilities after Hutton, including the Harold Hutton Sports Center and the Betty Hutton Williams Colonnade. The Betty Hutton Williams Medal, established in 1994, is the highest academic honor given to a Chapman University business or economics student. Additionally, author Lan Cao is currently Betty Hutton Williams Professor of International Economic Law at Chapman University.

"Betty the Panther"- The statue – depicting a panther leaping up to try to capture an eagle — is named in honor of the late philanthropist and longtime Chapman supporter Betty Hutton Williams. The particularly athletic leap of the university mascot is emblematic of Williams’ indomitable support and enthusiasm for Chapman, President Jim Doti said during the dedication.

The California-based Hutton Parker Foundation owns and operates 16 nonprofit office buildings (15 in Santa Barbara County) - with nearly 100 nonprofit tenants. The rents are below-market, but the cash flow brings liquidity to the foundation, helping to fund a total of more than $50 million in grants. Hutton Parker makes most of these grants for operating expenses - not new programs. The $100 Million Secret (Kele Books) is a blueprint of a unique way of investing in local real estate for nonprofit use that produced more than twice the amount of income of traditional Wall Street investments. Hutton Parker Foundation funds Capital and Multi-Year Grants on a very limited basis. Applications for Capital Grant Funds and/or Multi-Year Grant funds are by invitation only. Capital and Multi-Year funding is limited to organizations located in Santa Barbara County, California. If awarded, grants range from $50,000 – $500,000.

The Hutton Parker Foundation is headquartered at 15 East Carrillo Street, Santa Barbara, CA 93101

== Operations ==
As a long-term investment company, as well as a developer, Hutton acquires land, develops plans, secures entitlements, arranges financing and manages the construction of projects, primarily for its account and at times in conjunction with select partners or institutions. In addition to master-planned business communities and luxury apartments, Hutton is known for providing turnkey facilities for public agencies including development, property management and the ability to arrange entire financing packages.

Its clients were companies or public agencies requiring build-to-suit commercial or industrial property, prospective investors, and individual residential or commercial tenants.

== Flagship Projects ==
- College Park, Upland/Claremont, CA

40-acre (160,000 m^{2}) master planned mixed-use community. Featuring approximately 100 single-family homes, 448 luxury apartment homes and an integrated neighborhood retail center adjacent to the Claremont Colleges.

- Hutton Centre, Santa Ana, CA

46-acre (190,000 m^{2}) master planned mixed-use community near Orange County's John Wayne Airport. With nearly 20,000,000 square feet (1,900,000 m^{2}) of professional office space with supporting retail and restaurants.

=== Public / Private Ventures ===
- Hutton Imperial Center, Norwalk, CA

30 acres (120,000 m^{2}), Headquarters facility for Los Angeles County Recorder and Registrar of Voters totaling 260,000 square feet (24,000 m^{2}).

- Hutton Civic Center, Santa Ana, CA

Orange County Sheriff's Headquarters, Forensic Science Center, Environmental Management Agency, 380,000 square feet (35,000 m^{2}).
