= Middlesbrough and Guisborough Railway =

Railway line in North Yorkshire, England

The Middlesbrough & Guisborough Railway (M&G) was a railway line serving the towns of Middlesbrough and Guisborough as well as areas of the Eston Hills in North Yorkshire from 1853 to 1964 when the Guisborough terminus closed. More than half the line's original length is still in use as part of the Esk Valley Line from Middlesbrough to Whitby.

== History ==
=== Beginning ===
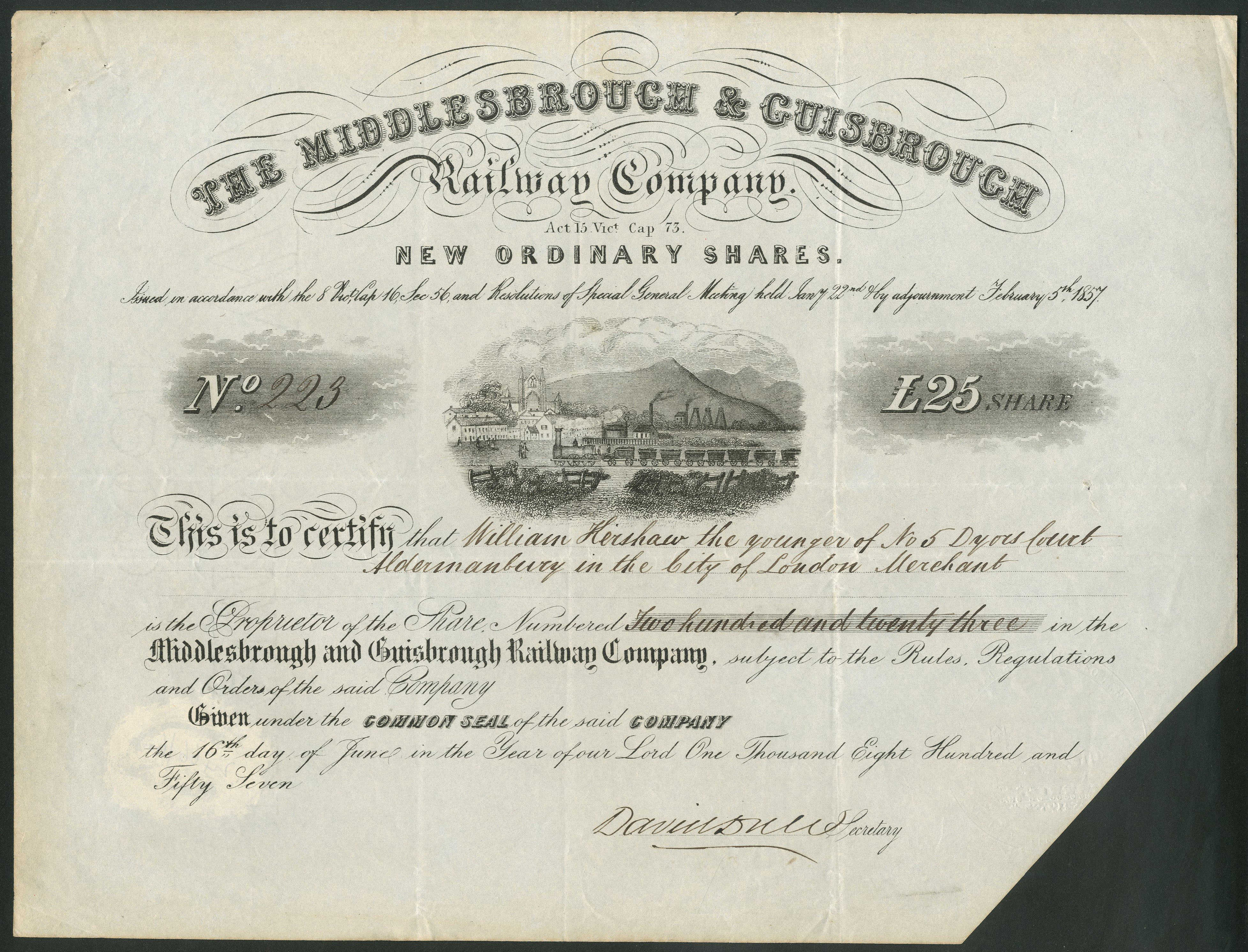
Share of the Middlesbrough and Guisborough Railway Company, issued 16 June 1857

The M&G was backed by Joseph Pease and his family, one of the major local iron ore mine owners. It was one of two railway schemes (along with the Cleveland Railway) competing for the mining business in the area. The scheme was promoted by the Stockton & Darlington Railway (S&DR), which worked the line and absorbed it in 1858.

The line was opened in 1853 to an iron ore mine at Codhill, and passenger services started a year later, stopping in the villages of Ormesby, Nunthorpe and Pinchinthorpe, before terminating at Guisborough. A private station also existed for the sole use of the Pease family at Hutton Gate for the nearby Hutton Hall.

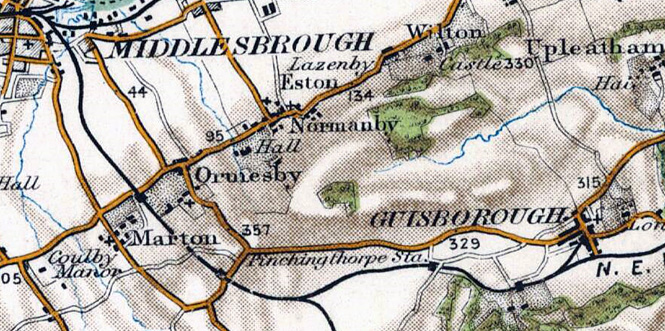
Map of the route of the Middlesbrough and Guisborough Railway as of 1902

The Cleveland Railway's original Act was for a line east of Guisborough, but it also developed a rival line across private land branching from further along the S&DR than the M&G, and after permission from the government, its line extended to Guisborough, meaning the town was served by two railway lines.

Despite the line's close proximity to the Picton-Battersby Line, it was not until 1865 that the Nunthorpe-Battersby Link was built to connect the two lines.

=== Part of NER ===
During 1863-5 both M&G and the Cleveland Railway were absorbed by NER and the old Cleveland line was abandoned south of Ormesby. NER then connected the line east of Guisborough to the M&G line before Guisborough, meaning trains had to reverse out of the terminal before continuing along the line to Loftus. It remained this way until its closure in 1960.

A new station was built at Pinchinthorpe and in 1904 Hutton Gate was purchased for public use. The remaining stretch of the Cleveland line was connected to the Middlesbrough-Redcar line and was run as a goods service until 1966.

Pinchinthorpe station closed in 1951, with Hutton Gate and Guisborough closing when the branch line service from Middlesbrough ended in 1964.

=== Present day ===
The line from Nunthorpe Junction to Guisborough closed in 1964 leaving the section from Middlesbrough open to Battersby. This still remains in use as part of the Esk Valley Line, represented by the non-faded part of the diagram.

Ormesby station was renamed to Marton to take advantage of the James Cook connection, and Gypsy Lane was opened.

In January 2019, Campaign for Better Transport released a report identifying the line which was listed as Priority 2 for reopening. Priority 2 is for those lines which require further development or a change in circumstances (such as housing developments).

== Gallery ==
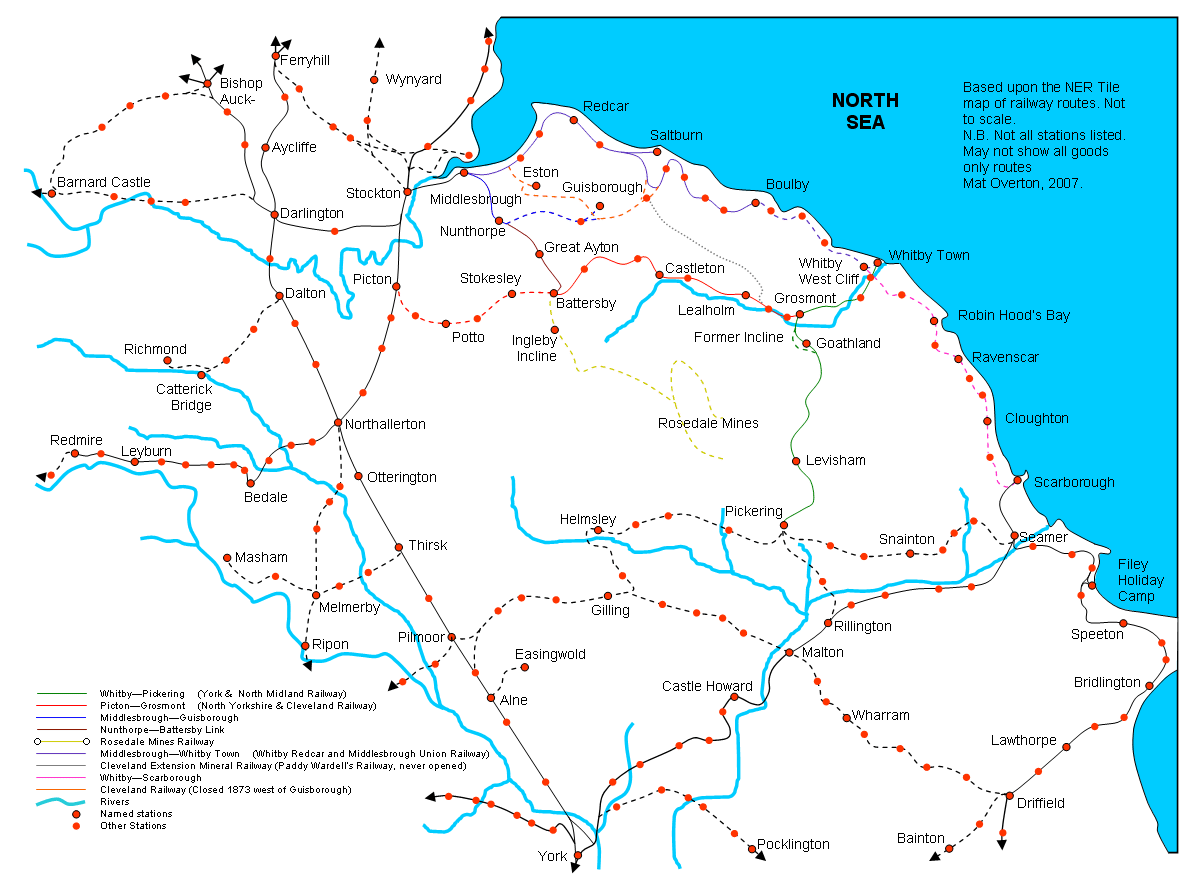
Map of route and surrounding railways
