= Hutton Hall, Guisborough =

Country house in North Yorkshire, England

Coordinates: 54.5222°N 1.0757°W

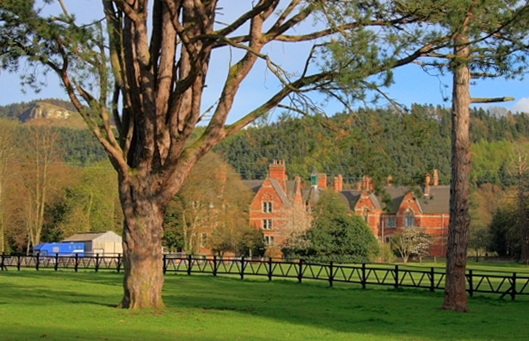
Hutton Hall

Hutton Hall is a grade II listed country house in the Hutton Lowcross area to the south west of Guisborough, North Yorkshire, England.

== History ==
The Victorian Gothic house was built in 1866 by Alfred Waterhouse for the Quaker industrialist and member of parliament, Joseph Pease. Pease was involved in local ironstone mining and had bought the estate in 1851. The house and stable block were set in 113 hectares (280 acres) of parkland; laid out by James Pulham the estate included a kitchen garden, an exotic fernery, shrubbery, waterfalls, streams and bridges.

Hutton Gate railway station was built in about 1867 to serve Hutton Hall, becoming a public station only in 1904.

In 1902, a banking crash forced Joseph Pease to sell the house. James Warley Pickering bought it in 1905, and passed to his son. During the 1930s much of the woodland was felled. It was sold again in 1935 to Alfred Pease. During the Spanish Civil War, Ruth Pennyman of Ormesby Hall contacted Alfred Pease to request the use of Hutton Hall to house Spanish nuns and Basque refugees; the first 20 children arrived on 1 July 1937. During World War II it was requisitioned by the military. In 1948, the hall, and the 13.5 acres (5.5 ha) which remained of the estate, were sold to John Mathison.

== Architecture ==
The two-storey red brick building has stone dressings and slate roofs. The seven-bay south front has a slate canopy. On the east side is a conservatory which has an internal arcade of arches on flute columns below a parapet.
