= Kildale =

Village and civil parish in North Yorkshire, England

Coordinates: 54°28′35″N 1°03′49″W

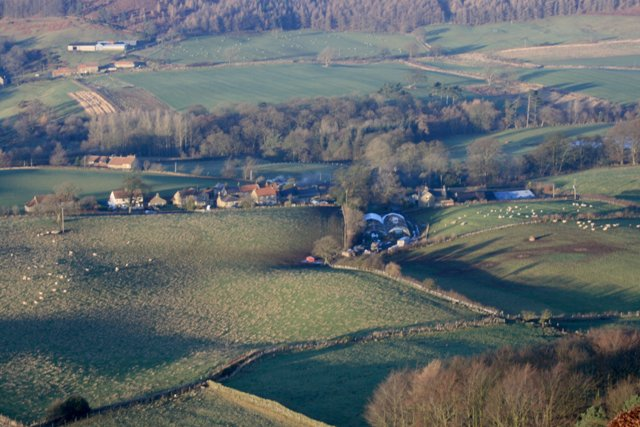
- Looking down on Kildale from Park Nab, Christmas Day, 2007

- Location within North Yorkshire
- Population: 147 (2011 census)
- OS grid reference: NZ6284209682
- Civil parish: Kildale
- Unitary authority: North Yorkshire
- Ceremonial county: North Yorkshire
- Region: Yorkshire and the Humber
- Country: England
- Sovereign state: United Kingdom
- Post town: Whitby
- Postcode district: YO21
- Police: North Yorkshire
- Fire: North Yorkshire
- Ambulance: Yorkshire
- UK Parliament: Richmond and Northallerton

Kildale is a village and civil parish in the county of North Yorkshire, England. It lies approximately 3 miles (4.8 km) south-east from Great Ayton, within the North York Moors National Park and on the Cleveland Way National Trail. The parish occupies 5,730 acres (23.2 km^{2}), with 3,416 acres (13.82 km^{2}) being taken up by moorland.

A church at Kildale was referred to in the Domesday Book. Viking relics (bones, swords, daggers and a battle axe) were discovered on the spot where a later church, St Cuthbert's, was erected.

From 1974 to 2023 it was part of the Hambleton District. It is now administered by the unitary North Yorkshire Council. Kildale railway station is on the Esk Valley Line.

== History ==
=== Origins ===
The name of the village, Kildale has derived from Norman times where it was scribed as Childale. The transition from 'Chil' to 'Kil' is uncertain, but the change could have occurred in Saxon times because of the Norse Kyll stream, or after the name of a Saxon proprietor patronymic.

In 900 years, the lands of Kildale have been owned by three families. Kildale was in the hands of the Percy family from an early date. Around 1662 John Turner purchased Kildale, then after the death of the last Turner in 1806, Kildale was then bought by Robert Bell Livesey of Thirsk, who then passed the parish of Kildale down to his daughter who married into the Turton family. It is still owned by the Turton family today.

Stone built walls were built as boundaries to enclose Kildale's fields and many are still standing today, over 300 years later. Farms and the majority of houses are tennants owned by the landlords of the estate.

=== Population change ===
The highest peak in Kildale's population is shown to have been in 1880 this may have been due to the expansion of the mineral trade within Kildale. The greatest change in population is present between 1881 and 1885, this may be due to high infant mortality rates and low occupational structure. From the late 19th century onwards, population figures within Kildale began to increase again, most likely due to improved medical facilities meaning a lower death toll amongst infants and people living longer contributing to the age structure of Kildale's population.

=== Occupational structure ===
The occupational data gathered from the 1881 census shows that the women of Kildale were more involved in domestic services, for example cooking and sewing, whereas within the male population the most predominant type of work was in agriculture (mostly farming) and working in the mines of Kildale in which they extracted jet and iron ore. In contrast, the 2001 census shows that the most popular occupation for males and females in Kildale is working in the service industry sector. These industries include retail, transport and distribution food services to name a few. The 2011 Census revealed a further change, with education becoming the dominant industry among women in Kildale and construction becoming the main industry for local men.

Comparing these census reports, one can see how Kildale's occupational structure has changed over time, going from a more hands on labour approach to working in service industries. The occupational structure has changed most likely due to the expansion of technological development and modernisation. The mines are no longer active, and although farming practices are still carried out, fewer people work in the agricultural sector as with today's advanced technology many machines can do the same job with one person rather than the workload farming included in the 1880s.

== Literature ==
Many books containing descriptions of journeys made around Britain between the twelfth and the nineteenth centuries were written. The historian William Camden made one reference to Kildale in his piece of travel writing 'Yorkshire: East and North Ridings’. Along with Kildale being mentioned in a piece of travel writing, a gazetteer entry was also made by John Bartholomew, 1887 commenting on Kildale's geographical situation and population.

== Landmarks and events ==
=== St Cuthbert's Church ===
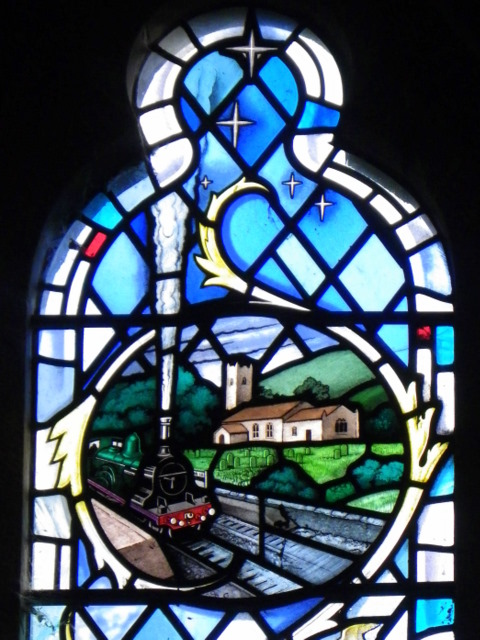
Stained glass window at St Cuthbert's Church, April 2011

The parish church was built in 1868 and dedicated to St Cuthbert. It replaced an earlier church of Norman origin and is approached across an iron railway bridge at the western end of Kildale station. The church is in the Early English style and is enhanced by its detailed stained-glass millennium window showing (amongst other panes marking Kildale's community and its beautiful surroundings) a steam train passing through Kildale, created by Goddard & Gibbs in c. 1992–96. The church has a framed list of the names of all the people living in Kildale marking the millennium. it includes most of the people who farmed in the parish between 1806 and 2006, the period during which Kildale has been owned by the Turton/Sutcliffe family.

During the construction of St Cuthbert's Church Viking relics were found, indicating that the church grounds have been of great importance for centuries.

=== Captain Cook's Monument ===
Captain Cook's Monument was built in 1827 in memory of the circumnavigator Captain James Cook. The monument is about one and a half miles from Kildale and commemorates the man who grew up on a farm under the hill on which it stands.

=== Kildale Barn ===
Kildale Barn at Park Farm is a listed building. The former barn and wheelhouse reopened in 1992 as an 18-place camping barn. It was funded by the Youth Hostel Association and the Long Distance Walkers Association, Kildale Barn is situated in the North York Moors National Park.

=== Kildale Show ===
Kildale's country show takes place on the first Saturday in September each year.

== Sport ==
Kildale Cricket Club was established in 1902 and the club ground is situated a kilometre west of the village before you reach the River Leven. The club has two senior teams: a Saturday 1st XI, which competes in the Langbaurgh Cricket League, and a Midweek Senior XI in the Esk Valley Evening League.
