= SFM =

SFM may refer to:

== Entertainment ==
- SFM Holiday Network, a defunct "occasional" U.S. television network
- "Sing for Me" (Christina Aguilera song), also released by Ginny Blackmore with the title "SFM"
- Source Filmmaker, a tool for animating, editing, and rendering 3D animated videos using assets from different games which use the Source engine

== Organizations ==
- SFM Entertainment, a television distribution company
- Scuderia Ferrari, the racing division of the Ferrari automobile company, formerly known as Scuderia Ferrari Marlboro
- Seaside FM, a radio station in East Yorkshire, UK
- Serveis Ferroviaris de Mallorca, a railway operating on the Spanish island of Majorca
- Società per le Strade Ferrate Meridionali, an Italian railway company of the 19th century

== Places ==
- Sanford Seacoast Regional Airport (IATA code), in Sanford, Maine
- Science Fiction Museum and Hall of Fame, formerly part of what is now the EMP Museum in Seattle, Washington

== Science and technology ==
- Sales force management (likewise Sales drive management), information systems used for automating and managing sales, often as a part of a larger CRM system; see also SFM system (likewise Sales Force Automation)
- SFMBT1 or "scm-like with four MBT domains 1", a gene whose proteins show elevated levels in some cancers.
- Scanning force microscopy or atomic force microscopy, a very high-resolution type of scanning probe microscopy
- Shoulder-fired missile
- Spectral flatness measurement, used in digital audio signal processing
- Structure from motion, a process used in computer vision
- Surface feet per minute, a unit of velocity used in machining to identify the machinability ratings of a material
- Sustainable forest management, the management of forests according to the principles of sustainable development

== Other uses ==
- SFM Junak, a brand of Polish motorcycles
- ŠK Senec, formerly known as ŠK SFM Senec, a Slovak soccer club
- SFM is the ticker symbol for the cryptocurrency SafeMoon.

== See also ==
- SFMA (disambiguation)
