= Withernsea Pier =

Demolished pier in Withernsea, East Riding of Yorkshire, England

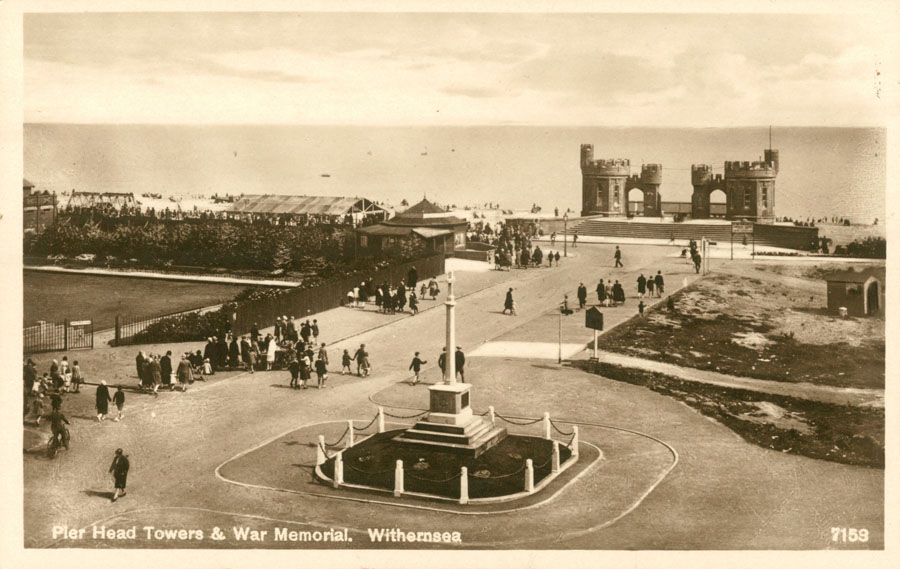
- Pier head towers on the promenade in 1920
- Type: Victorian pleasure pier
- Spans: North Sea
- Location: Withernsea, East Riding of Yorkshire, England
- Coordinates: 53.731°N 0.0364°E

Characteristics
- Total length: 1,196 feet (365 m)
- Width: 14 feet (4.3 m)
- Vertical clearance: 16 feet (4.9 m) (above high tide)

History
- Designer: Thomas Cargill
- Opening date: 1877 (partial); 1877 (full)
- Closure date: 1893
- Demolition date: 1903

Withernsea Pier was a pier in the town of Withernsea, East Riding of Yorkshire, England. The pier was constructed between 1875 and 1877 to attract daytrippers, but was beset by accidents from the outset. Storms and ship-caused damage led to the pier being closed by 1893, and it was completely dismantled by 1903, leaving only the distinctive castellated pier towers on the seafront, which are still there to this day.

In the 21st century, a proposal was floated with the idea of rebuilding the pier to a length of 500 feet (150 m), less than half the distance of the old pier.

== History ==
In 1871, a local entrepreneur, Anthony Bannister, formed the Withernsea Pier, Promenade, Gas & General Improvement Company (WPPG&GIC) after the railway had opened to Withernsea from Hull. Bannister realised that improvements to the town would encourage daytrippers. The intention was to create a pier that would extend into the sea to a distance of 1,200 feet (370 m) on iron piles which would be rooted to a depth of 380 feet (120 m) below the low water mark. Mapping from the 1870s indicates that the pier was originally intended to be built further north, but the eventual build was opposite the railway station. Besides being used as a tourist attraction, it was hoped that the pier could be used as an embarkation/disembarkation point for shipping, and also somewhere to land fish.

Construction of the pier started in February 1875, under the engineer Thomas Cargill and the building firm of J Gardiner, with an estimated cost of £10,000. The length was determined to be 1,230 feet (370 m) and the width was 21 feet 6 inches (6.55 m). The pier and pier towers were in a direct line from the railway station across Pier Road. The pier was opened as an interim measure in August 1875, but full completion opening came without public ceremony on Friday 18 August 1877, with the final cost being £14,000. In the end, the length was 1,196 feet (365 m), the width was 14 feet (4.3 m), and the pier stood 16 feet (4.9 m) above the high-tide mark. The two castellated towers at the landward end of the pier were noted for being modelled on Conwy Castle. The construction period was beset with problems, on at least two occasions, weather-related incidents wrecked the staging being used to build the pier, and high tides destroyed three piles at the very seaward end of the pier.

When the pier was open in the 1870s, visitors to the pier were charged a penny to "stroll outover the sea". However, by 1888 when it was under a new proprietor, the shortened pier was free to "..schoolchildren, orphans and blind people".

A gash in the middle of the pier caused by a coal barge (see incidents section), was left unrepaired for almost a year before a report in June 1881 in the local paper prompted the WPPG&GIC to repair the gap with plain wood. By now the company was having financial problems and they filed for bankruptcy in December 1881. Further damage was caused by other gales and shipping over the years, and at an inquest into the death of the captain of a fishing vessel (Genesta), the coroner recommended that a lighthouse be built in Withernsea to help shipping. The lighthouse opened in March 1894, but unfortunately a year too late for Withernsea Pier which, in March 1893, was destroyed by the Henry Parr. The action of the ship colliding with the iron supports covered spectators in a "shower of sparks". This left just 50 feet (15 m) of pier, and when the seafront was remodelled in 1903, what remained was removed. The yellow-brick castellated towers on the landward side were left in place, and are noted landmarks on the seafront in the town.

== Incidents ==
The pier suffered from several incidents during its existence, with ship strikes finally closing the pier after only 26 years.

- March 1875 – during the construction phase, a crane collapsed crushing and killing a 17-year old boy beneath it.
- 28 February 1877 – a storm loosened some of the staging around the new pier construction. This all then came away and slipped into the sea demolishing one strut and bending girders. The damage was estimated at £200, and delayed the opening of the pier.
- 28 October 1880 – a fierce storm in the North Sea drove two ships into the pier; Jabez hit the end of the pier and sunk with all hands, whilst a coal barge named Saffron struck the middle of the pier gouging out a 150–180-foot (46–55 m) gap. The same storm washed away nearby Hornsea Pier, and drove a ship into Redcar Pier.
- 6 March 1883 – another storm washed away the pier head. Over half of the seaward end of the pier from where the Saffron struck it, was washed away in a gale.
- 20 October 1890 – the wreck of the fishing smack Genesta crashed into the pier reducing its length by a further 300 feet (91 m).
- 22 March 1893 – the vessel Henry Parr crashed into the pier on a stormy night. This cut the pier and left only 50 feet (15 m) extending from the pier towers.

== New pier ==
Withernsea New Pier
Characteristics
- Total length: 500 feet (150 m) (projected)

In January 2021, the first stage of the new pier was given the go-ahead, with funding from the East Coast Communities Fund, local fundraising and funding from the National Lottery. The new pier is intended to be 500-foot (150 m) long, only half of the original pier, but wider. The project is being promoted by the Withernsea Pier and Promenade Association, who plan to build the pier in stages. In January 2020, the cost of the project was estimated at £8 million.

The first stage of the new build is a viewing platform extending from the pier towers. This was costed at £70,000 in 2016, which had risen to £235,000 by the time of the approval had been granted in January 2021. In April 2021, building work was halted after "East Riding Council... raised a number of additional questions on the plans submitted some months ago." In May 2023, the project was formally abandoned, with a spokesperson from the group describing the new structure as "no longer viable."
