= Numismatics =

Study of currencies, coins and paper money

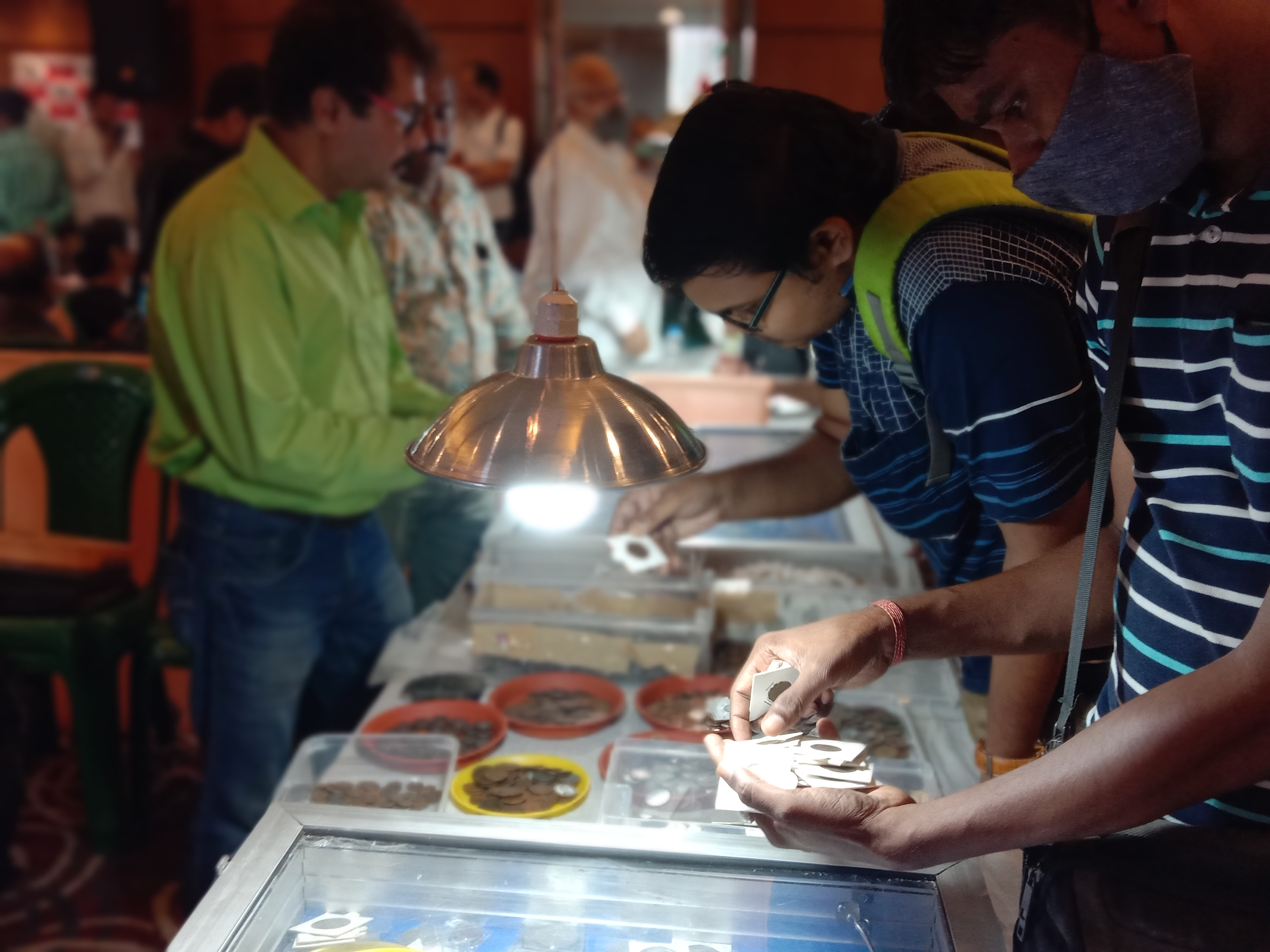
Coin collectors and enthusiasts at an exhibition organized by the Numismatic Society of Calcutta, Kolkata, West Bengal, in 2022

Numismatics is the study or collection of currency, including coins, tokens, paper money, medals, and related objects. Experts of this study, known as numismatists, are often characterized as students or collectors of coins, but the discipline also includes the broader study of money and other means of payment used to resolve debts and exchange goods.

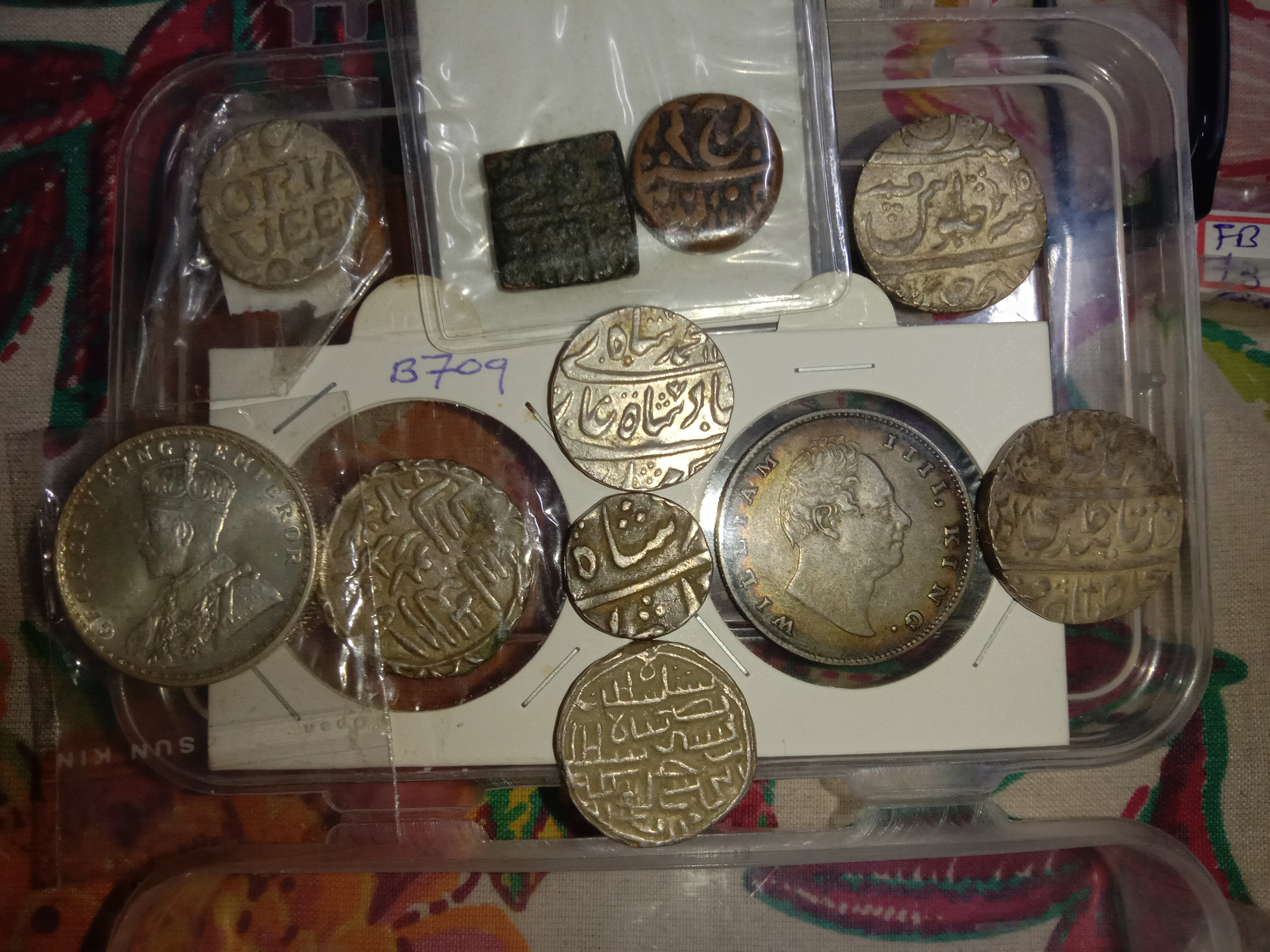
Numismatic specimens from Ancient, medieval and British India, made of silver.

The earliest forms of money used by people are categorised by collectors as "odd and curious", but the use of other goods in barter exchange is excluded, even where used as a circulating currency (e.g., cigarettes or instant noodles in prison). As an example, the Kyrgyz people used horses as the principal currency unit, and gave small change in lambskins; the lambskins may be suitable for numismatic study, but the horses are not. Many objects have been used for centuries, such as cowry shells, precious metals, cocoa beans, large stones, and gems.

== Etymology ==
First attested in English in 1829, the word numismatics comes from the adjective numismatic, meaning 'of coins'. It was borrowed in 1792 from French numismatique, itself a derivation from Late Latin numismatis, genitive of numisma, a variant of nomisma meaning 'coin'. Nomisma is a latinisation of the Greek νόμισμα (nomisma) which means 'current coin/custom', which derives from νομίζειν (nomizein) 'to hold or own as a custom or usage, to use customarily', in turn from νόμος (nomos) 'usage, custom', ultimately from νέμειν (nemein) 'to dispense, divide, assign, keep, hold'.

== History of money ==
Throughout its history, money itself has been made to be a scarce good. Many materials have been used to form money, from naturally scarce precious metals and cowry shells through cigarettes to entirely artificial money, called fiat money, such as banknotes. Many complementary currencies use time as a unit of measure, using mutual credit accounting that keeps the balance of money intact.

Modern money (along with most ancient money) is essentially a token – an abstraction. Paper currency is perhaps the most common type of contemporary physical money. However, goods such as gold or silver retain many of the essential properties of money, such as price fluctuation and limited supply, although these goods are not controlled by one single authority.

== History ==
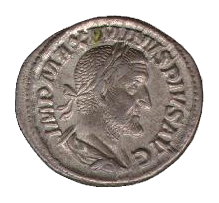
A Roman denarius, a standardized silver coin, which depicts emperor Maximinus Thrax

Coin collecting may have possibly existed in ancient times. Augustus gave "coins of every device, including old pieces of the kings and foreign money" as Saturnalia gifts.

Petrarch, who wrote in a letter that he was often approached by vine diggers with old coins asking him to buy or to identify the ruler, is credited as the first Renaissance collector. Petrarch presented a collection of Roman coins to Emperor Charles IV in 1355.

The first book on coins was De Asse et Partibus (1514) by Guillaume Budé. During the early Renaissance ancient coins were collected by European royalty and nobility. Collectors of coins were Pope Boniface VIII, Emperor Maximilian of the Holy Roman Empire, Louis XIV of France, Ferdinand I, Elector Joachim II of Brandenburg who started the Berlin coin cabinet and Henry IV of France to name a few. Numismatics is called the "Hobby of Kings", due to its most esteemed founders.

Professional societies organised in the 19th century. The Royal Numismatic Society was founded in 1836 and immediately began publishing the journal that became the Numismatic Chronicle. The American Numismatic Society was founded in 1858 and began publishing the American Journal of Numismatics in 1866.

In 1931 the British Academy launched the Sylloge Nummorum Graecorum publishing collections of Ancient Greek coinage. The first volume of Sylloge of Coins of the British Isles was published in 1958.

In the 20th century, coins gained recognition as archaeological objects, and scholars such as Guido Bruck of the Kunsthistorisches Museum in Vienna realized their value in providing a temporal context and the difficulty that curators faced when identifying worn coins using classical literature. After World War II in Germany, a project, Fundmünzen der Antike (Coin finds of the Classical Period) was launched to register every coin found within Germany. This idea found successors in many countries.

In the United States, the US Mint established a coin cabinet in 1838 when chief coiner Adam Eckfeldt donated his personal collection. William E. Du Bois' Pledges of History... (1846) describes the cabinet.

C. Wyllys Betts' American colonial history illustrated by contemporary medals (1894) set the groundwork for the study of American historical medals.

Helen Wang's "A short history of Chinese numismatics in European languages" (2012–2013) gives an outline history of Western countries' understanding of Chinese numismatics. Lyce Jankowski's Les amis des monnaies is an in-depth study of Chinese numismatics in China in the 19th century.

== Professional organizations ==
The IAPN is an international organization of professional coin dealers and numismatic firms. It was founded in 1951 in Geneva and aims to promote high ethical standards in the numismatic trade, support research projects, and provide expertise on issues such as counterfeiting. Membership requires sponsorship and several years of professional activity in the numismatic field.

The American Numismatic Association (ANA) is a United States-based nonprofit organization founded in 1891 that supports the study and collection of coins, paper money, and medals. It offers educational programs, publishes numismatic research, hosts conventions and exhibitions, and maintains a library and museum. Membership is open to the public.

=== Modern ===
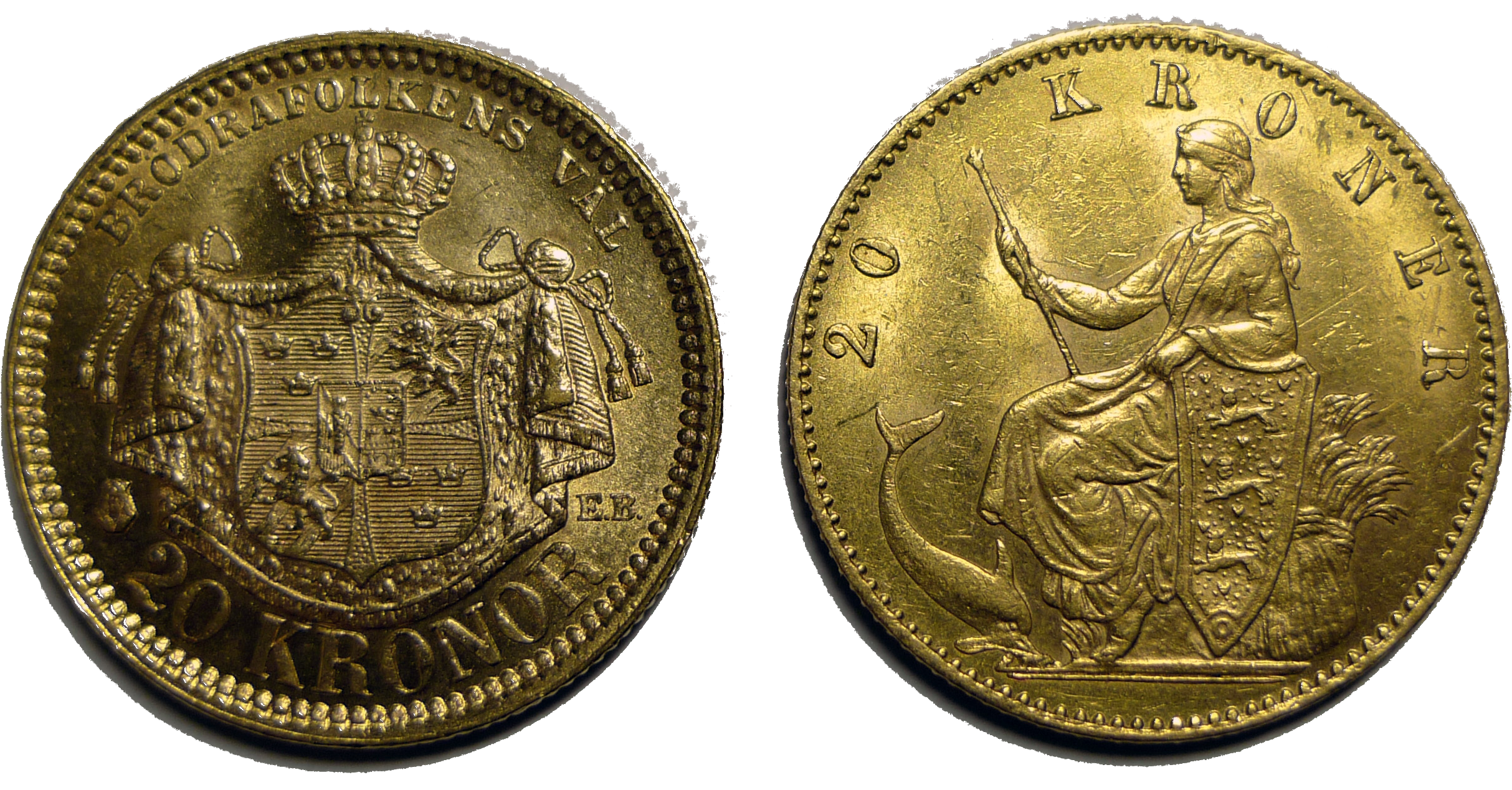
Two 20 kr gold coins from the Scandinavian Monetary Union

Modern numismatics is the study of the coins of the mid-17th century onward, the period of machine-struck coins. Their study serves more the need of collectors than historians, and it is more often successfully pursued by amateur aficionados than by professional scholars. The focus of modern numismatics frequently lies in the research of production and use of money in historical contexts using mint or other records in order to determine the relative rarity of the coins they study. Varieties, mint-made errors, the results of progressive die wear, mintage figures, and even the sociopolitical context of coin mintings are also matters of interest.

=== Subfields ===
Exonumia (UK English: Paranumismatica) is the study of coin-like objects such as token coins and medals, and other items used in place of legal currency or for commemoration. This includes elongated coins, encased coins, souvenir medallions, tags, badges, counter-stamped coins, wooden nickels, credit cards, and other similar items. It is related to numismatics proper (concerned with coins which have been legal tender), and many coin collectors are also exonumists.

Notaphily is the study of paper money or banknotes. It is believed that people have been collecting paper money for as long as it has been in use. However, people only started collecting paper money systematically in Germany in the 1920s, particularly the Serienscheine (Series notes) Notgeld. The turning point occurred in the 1970s when notaphily was established as a separate area by collectors. At the same time, some developed countries such as the United States, Germany, and France began publishing their respective national catalogs of paper money, which represented major points of reference literature.

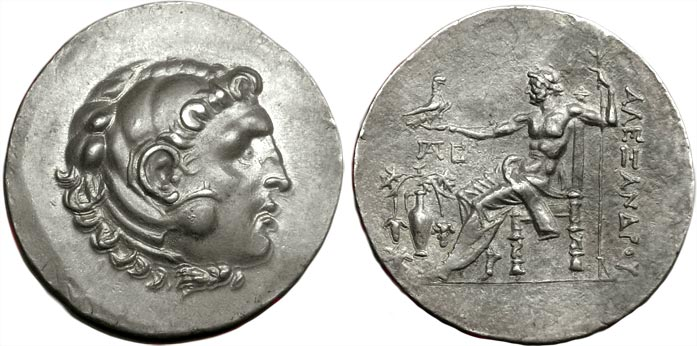
Alexander the Great memorial tetradrachm from the Temnos mint, struck in c. 188–170 BC

Scripophily is the study and collection of companies' shares and bonds certificates. It is an area of collecting due to both the inherent beauty of some historical documents as well as the interesting historical context of each document. Some stock certificates are excellent examples of engraving. Occasionally, an old stock document will be found that still has value as stock in a successor company.

== See also ==
- Awards for numismatics
- Glossary of numismatics
- List of numismatic collections
- List of numismatic journals
- List of numismatists
- Numismatic associations
