= Stainsacre =

Village in North Yorkshire, England

Coordinates: 54.464077°N 0.590773°W

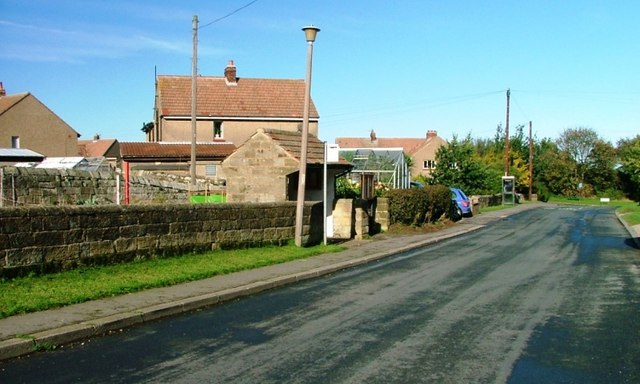
- Road in the village

- Location within North Yorkshire
- OS grid reference: NZ915085
- Civil parish: Hawsker-cum-Stainsacre
- Unitary authority: North Yorkshire
- Ceremonial county: North Yorkshire
- Region: Yorkshire and the Humber
- Country: England
- Sovereign state: United Kingdom
- Post town: WHITBY
- Postcode district: YO22
- Police: North Yorkshire
- Fire: North Yorkshire
- Ambulance: Yorkshire
- UK Parliament: Scarborough and Whitby

Stainsacre is a village in the civil parish of Hawsker-cum-Stainsacre, in the English county of North Yorkshire and situated on the edge of the North York Moors National Park. It lies approximately 2 miles (3.2 km) south-east of Whitby, close to the A171 road. From 1974 until 2023 the village formed part of the Borough of Scarborough; it is now administered by North Yorkshire Council, assisted by the parish council of Hawsker-cum-Stainsacre.

The population of Stainsacre was recorded as 144 in 1809. In the early 19th century it was the seat of Jonathan Sanders, a merchant. By 1884, Stainsacre Hall was occupied by W. H. Attley. The hall was later acquired by Middlesbrough Borough Council and operated as an educational and outdoor activity centre until 2010, when it was sold due to rising costs and declining attendance.

The Scarborough and Whitby railway line ran through Stainsacre, although the nearest stop was at Hawsker station, approximately 1 kilometre (0.62 mi) to the south-west. Both the line and the station closed in 1965. The former railway trackbed is now used by the Cinder Track, a multi-use trail connecting Scarborough and Whitby, which is accessible from several points within the village and is used by walkers, cyclists, and horse riders.

Stainsacre lies within the Church of England ecclesiastical parish of All Saints' Church in nearby Hawsker. The village has one public house, the Windmill.

== See also ==
- Listed buildings in Hawsker-cum-Stainsacre
