= Listed buildings in Withernsea =

Withernsea is a civil parish in the county of the East Riding of Yorkshire, England. It contains six listed buildings that are recorded in the National Heritage List for England. Of these, one is listed at Grade II*, the middle of the three grades, and the others are at Grade II, the lowest grade. The parish contains the seaside town of Withernsea and the surrounding area. All the listed buildings are in the town, and consist of two churches, a lighthouse and associated structures, a commemorative lamp standard, and a war memorial.

== Key ==
Grade	Criteria
II*	Particularly important buildings of more than special interest
II	Buildings of national importance and special interest

== Buildings ==
Name and location	Photograph	Date	Notes	Grade
St Nicholas' Church; 53.72812°N 0.03343°E		Mid-15th century	The church, which was largely rebuilt in 1858–59 by Cuthbert Brodrick, is built in cobbles and stone, with limestone to the chancel, and a Welsh slate roof. The church consists of a nave with a clerestory, north and south aisles, a south porch, a chancel with a north vestry, and a west tower. The tower has two stages, diagonal and clasping buttresses, and a pointed three-light west window with a hood mould, above which is a small square window and a moulded string course. The two-light pointed bell openings contain Y-tracery, and there are clock faces, above which is a moulded string course, and a coped embattled stone parapet with cobbled trefoil panels. The chancel also has embattled parapets and crocketed pinnacles.	II*
Withernsea Lighthouse and keepers' houses 53.73094°N 0.02876°E		1892–93	The lighthouse is in whitewashed stuccoed brick and consists of a tapered tower on a chamfered plinth, with six stages and a height of about 38 metres (125 ft). It contains recessed two-light windows with quoined surrounds, and a painted panel in relief with a coat of arms. At the top is a coved cornice carrying a platform with railings, a tall faceted lantern, and a domed cupola with a handrail, surmounted by a cylindrical ventilator with a domed cap and a weathervane. From the base of the tower, a passage leads to two houses with two storeys and four bays, and Welsh slate roofs.	II
Outbuildings, wall and gateway, Withernsea Lighthouse; 53.73064°N 0.02893°E	—	1892–93	The outbuildings are in whitewashed stuccoed brick with Welsh slate roofs. They have a single storey, and consist of a two-bay store-house, a single-bay outhouse, and a three-bay lighthouse keeper's flat. The garden wall is in coped red brick, and contains a gateway with square coped piers and a wooden gate, and there is a smaller entrance to the right with similar piers.	II
Commemorative lamp standard 53.72841°N 0.03576°E		1897	The lamp standard commemorates the Diamond Jubilee of Queen Victoria. It is in cast iron on a concrete base, and has a splayed pedestal, on which is tapering fluted shaft rising to a moulded architrave under a folate frieze, with two ladder rests, on a cornice, on which is a 20th-century lantern. The pedestal is decorated and contains an inscribed plaque. The lamp standard is enclosed by a concrete surround with stylised cast iron dolphins and a spiked chain.	II
Withernsea Old War Memorial; 53.72859°N 0.03632°E	—	1921	The war memorial, in the Italian Gardens, is in limestone on a base of Bramley Fall stone. It consists of a Latin cross with emblems in relief, on a tapering octagonal shaft, on a square moulded plinth, on a base of three steps. On the plinth are bronze plaques in hardwood frames, with inscriptions to those who served in the First World War, and the names of those lost. On the top two steps is a plaque with an inscription and the names of those lost in the Second World War.	II
St Matthew's Church; 53.73076°N 0.02781°E		1934–35	The church is in red brick with a tile roof, and it has Arts and Crafts influences. It consists of a three-bay nave with narrow side aisles, a two-bay chancel, a north porch and a south vestry and organ chamber, and above the vestry and organ chamber is a short bellcote. At the west end is an entrance with a lean-to roof, above which are three lancet windows, and along the sides are five-light mullioned windows with hood moulds.	II
