= Seaside FM =

- Withernsea; England
- Broadcast area: Holderness
- Frequencies: 105.3 MHz; 103.5 MHz; and Internet
- Branding: Seaside FM

Programming
- Format: Contemporary music and community based speech

Ownership
- Owner: Seaside Radio Ltd.

History
- First air date: 5 October 2007

Technical information
- Power: 30 watts
- Transmitter coordinates: 53.7313°N 0.0337°E

Links
- Website: http://www.seasideradio.co.uk

Seaside FM (originally known as Seaside Radio) is an Independent Community Radio station based in Withernsea, East Riding of Yorkshire, England.

== Location ==
Seaside FM is based within the South Holderness Resource Centre (also known as the SHoRes Centre) on Seaside Road in the south Holderness town of Withernsea. This follows a move from rented premises at 27 Seaside Road, between AJ's Cafe and the South Holderness Resource Centre.

== History and background ==
"Seaside Radio Ltd" was originally set up by former Holderness Gazette editor Lyz Turner in 2003, along with volunteers such as Carl Slaughter and Luke Cullen. As a community-based communication and entertainment radio project, it received a limited license to broadcast part-time.

However, Seaside FM actually dates back to Easter 2001 when a temporary broadcast was set up in Keyingham in a property next to the old Junior School. Several youngsters had regular slots including Sean Hunter, Tom Fisher, Darren Spencer, and Ben Fisher. Known then as Seaside Radio, the signal was also picked up in Withernsea and along the borders of Kingston upon Hull. After the broadcast, it was thought that Seaside Radio could be developed further.

More small broadcasts took place in various places around the East Coast including Bridlington and Filey.

In November 2005, Ofcom awarded the station a full-time licence on the frequency of 105.3 MHz.

On 7 December 2006, Seaside FM passed an Ofcom inspection and was given the green light to start broadcasting.

After four years building Seaside FM from scratch and gaining charity status for the social enterprise, Turner stood down as Station Manager in September 2007, after obtaining all licences. In early 2007 the transmitter tower was erected before the arrival of the new manager.

Irishman Justin Macartney then took over on 3 September 2007. Following a second Ofcom inspection visit, Seaside FM launched on 105.3 MHz on 5 October 2007. Macartney stayed in charge of Seaside FM for the first five-year licence term. The SHoRes Centre then took over responsibility for the licence and a second five-year OFCOM licence was offered and accepted. A third five-year licence has now been offered by OFCOM.

In November 2021, Ofcom awarded the station a licence to extend its coverage to Hornsea using the frequency of 103.5 MHz.
