= Withernsea High School =

Community school in the East Riding of Yorkshire, England

Coordinates: 53.7320°N 0.0240°E

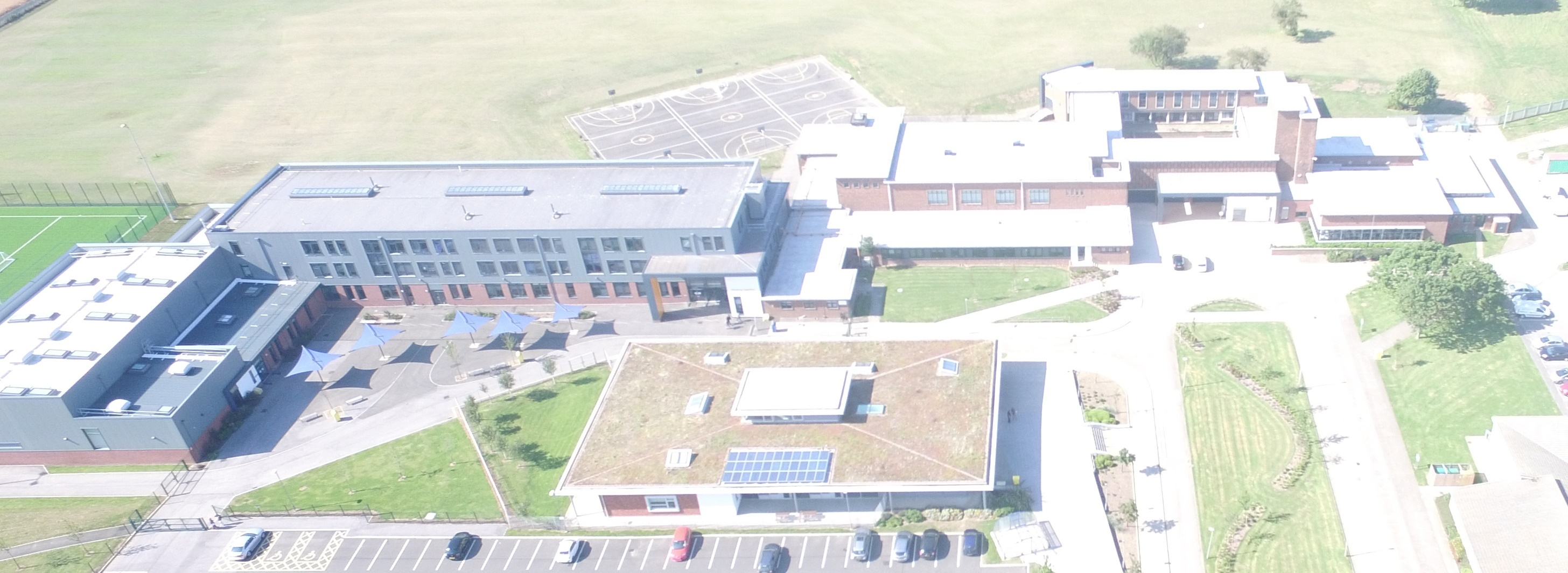

Location
- Hull Road; Withernsea; East Riding of Yorkshire, HU19 2EQ; England

Information
- Type: Comprehensive; Community school
- Established: 28 April 1955
- Local authority: East Riding of Yorkshire Council
- Department for Education URN: 118075 Tables
- Ofsted: Reports
- Headteacher: Mark Crofts
- Gender: Coeducational
- Age: 11 to 16
- Enrolment: 737 as of May 2022
- Website: Withernsea High School

Withernsea High School is a coeducational secondary school located in Withernsea in the East Riding of Yorkshire, England.

The school was officially opened on Thursday 28 April 1955 by Edward Wood, 1st Earl of Halifax. In December 2014 works began on a rebuild and refurbishment of the school buildings, with the works completed in summer 2016.

Today it is a community school administered by East Riding of Yorkshire Council.

Withernsea High School offers GCSEs and Cambridge Nationals as programmes of study for pupils.
