= SFMA =

SFMA may refer to:

- American Home Furnishings Alliance, formerly named Southern Furniture Manufacturers Association, a U.S. trade group
- Miami metropolitan area, formerly known as the South Florida metropolitan area
- Studien zu Fundmünzen der Antike, a German monograph series on archaeological numismatics
