= St Mary's Island (Tyne and Wear) =

Tidal island in North Tyneside, Tyne and Wear, England

Coordinates: 55°04′18″N 01°26′59″W

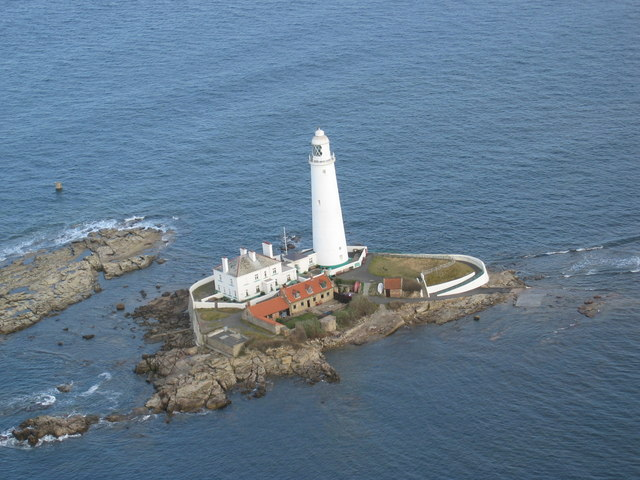
Aerial view of St Mary's Island

St Mary's Island, sometimes referred to as Bait Island is a small sandstone island near the seaside resort of Whitley Bay, Tyne and Wear, England. It is a Local Nature Reserve.

St Mary's Island was originally called Bates Island, Hartley Bates or Bates Hill as it was originally owned by the Bates family who were prominent locally, and the area of coastal mainland lying between the Brierdene Burn and Seaton Burn formed the township of Hartley. It is sometimes known as Bait Island, probably due to a misunderstanding of the meaning of the name. The island is opposite Curry's Point on the mainland and is connected to the coast at low tide by a rocky causeway for about 16 hours a day. The main feature of the island is St Mary's Lighthouse which was built in 1898.

In medieval times there was a chapel on the island dedicated to St Helen. Within the chapel was the Lady Light, also known as St Katherine's Light. The light was later, wrongly, ascribed to St Mary and, as a result, the island became known as St Mary's Island. It is debatable whether the light was used as a warning to shipping or was purely religious. Next to the chapel was a burial ground where monks and local people were interred. Traces of St. Helen's Chapel were destroyed when the lighthouse was built in 1898.

During the 19th century there was an inn, known as the 'Square and Compass', on the island, run by a Mr George Ewen. In 1895, after complaints about rowdy customers trespassing on nearby land, the landlord, Lord Hastings, had Mr Ewen and his family evicted from the island.

The lighthouse continued to function until 1984, when it was taken out of service. The lighthouse is now open to visitors who can climb the steps to the lantern room, if they wish, or see the Visitors' Centre.
