= Listed buildings in Hawsker-cum-Stainsacre =

Hawsker-cum-Stainsacre is a civil parish in the county of North Yorkshire, England. It contains fourteen listed buildings that are recorded in the National Heritage List for England. All the listed buildings are designated at Grade II, the lowest of the three grades, which is applied to "buildings of national importance and special interest". The parish contains the villages of Hawsker and Stainsacre and the surrounding countryside. Most of the listed buildings are houses, farmhouses and farm buildings, and the others include a wellhead, a pair of boundary stones, a lighthouse and keepers' cottages, and a church. Two of the listed buildings are in the lands common to Fylingdales and Hawsker-cum-Stainsacre, and are instead included in the article Listed buildings in Fylingdales.

== Buildings ==
Name and location	Photograph	Date	Notes
Hawsker Hall; 54.45483°N 0.57942°W	—	Early 18th century	The house was later extended and divided into two. The earlier part is in whitewashed sandstone, the later part is in red brick, partly rendered, and the house has an M-shaped pantile roof with coped gables and shaped kneelers. There are two storeys, and the earlier front has four bays and a lower two-bay range on the right. It contains a doorway with a fanlight and sash windows. The later front has six bays, and contains a doorway with a fanlight and a bracketed hood. The windows are sashes with painted wedge lintels, and above is a parapet and raking dormers.
Long Lease Farmhouse and outbuildings 54.46066°N 0.57945°W	—	Early 18th century or earlier	The farmhouse and outbuildings are in sandstone with some brick, quoins, and a pantile roof with coped gables and shaped kneelers. There are two storeys, a main range of three bays, and a single-storey single-bay extension. On the front are two small-pane windows with chamfered surrounds, most of the other windows are later replacements, and there are gabled half-dormers with bargeboards. Inside the house is an inglenook fireplace.
Dale Farmhouse and outbuildings 54.45899°N 0.59253°W	—	Mid 18th century	The farmhouse and outbuilding are in sandstone and have pantile roofs with copd gables and coped gables and shaped kneelers. The house has two storeys, a main range of three bays, a two-bay extension and an outshut. On the front is a Doric porch with an open pediment, and a doorway with a fluted surround and paterae. The windows are sashes, those in the ground floor are tripartite with keystones. At the rear is a round-arched stair window with imposts and a keystone.
T'awd Abba Well; 54.44881°N 0.55679°W		18th century (probable)	The wellhead is in red brick with a stone slab roof. It has a rectangular plan, a single storey, and the gable end faces the road. On the gable end is an inscribed plaque.
Red Barn; 54.46645°N 0.57873°W		Mid to late 18th century	The barn and byre with a loft is in red brick on a sandstone plinth, and has a pantile roof with coped gables and shaped kneelers. There is one storey and a loft, and two bays. The barn contains two doorways with segmental arches and slit vents, and in the left gable end is a window.
High Cote; 54.45418°N 0.56899°W	—	Late 18th to early 19th century	The house is in sandstone, and has a pantile roof with coped gables. There are two storeys and two bays. In the centre is a timber gabled porch and a doorway, and to the left is another doorway. To the right of the porch is a tripartite small-pane window, and the other windows are sashes.
Barn and horse engine house southeast of Long Lease Farmhouse; 54.46030°N 0.57859°W	—	Early 19th century	The barn and horse engine house have been converted into a house. They are in sandstone and have a pantile roof with a sandstone ridge, coping and plain kneelers. The horse engine house has a hexagonal plan with brick piers. Many of the original openings have been altered, and the vents have been blocked.
Farm buildings west of Long Lease Farmhouse; 54.46067°N 0.57982°W	—	Early 19th century	The range of farm buildings is in sandstone, and has a pantile roof with coped gables and plain kneelers. There is one storey and three bays. The range contains three stable doors and two horizontally-sliding sash windows.
Summerfield Farmhouse, walls, railings and gate piers 54.46382°N 0.57809°W	—	Early 19th century	The farmhouse is in sandstone, rendered at the rear, and has a Roman tile roof with coped gables and shaped kneelers. There are two storeys, three bays, and a half-outshut. The central doorway has fluted pilaster jambs, a fanlight and an open pediment. The windows are sashes with painted wedge lintels. The garden wall has sloped coping, and horizontal railings, ramped up at the ends, and the gate piers are square with pyramidal caps.
Robin Hood and Little John stones 54.47278°N 0.58577°W		19th century (probable)	A pair of field boundary stones in gritstone about 0.6 metres (2 ft 0 in) high. Each is a cylindrical stone with a circular flat cap and an inscription round the rim of the cap.
Whitby High Light; 54.47781°N 0.56828°W		1857–58	A lighthouse and keepers' cottages in painted rendered red brick on a chamfered plinth. The lighthouse has an octagonal tower with a gallery and a corrugated iron lantern surmounted by a conical cap finial and a weathervane. It is flanked by linking bays to single-storey two-bay cottages with sash windows and pyramidal roofs.
All Saints' Church; 54.46239°N 0.57881°W		1876–77	The church is in sandstone and has slate roofs with red ridge tiles. It consists of a nave, a south porch, a central tower, and a chancel with a north organ chamber and vestry. The tower has buttresses, a gabled staircase turret, lancet bell openings, and a steeply hipped roof with finials and a cross. The porch is gabled and timber framed, and the doorway has an ogee-arched head and a tympanum containing the date.
