= Hawsker =

Villages in North Yorkshire, England

Coordinates: 54°27′21″N 0°34′26″W

Hawsker: High and Low Hawsker
- Platform at Hawsker Station with former railway carriages.

- Location within North Yorkshire
- Population: 790
- OS grid reference: NZ925076
- Civil parish: Hawsker-cum-Stainsacre
- Unitary authority: North Yorkshire
- Ceremonial county: North Yorkshire
- Region: Yorkshire and the Humber
- Country: England
- Sovereign state: United Kingdom
- Post town: Whitby
- Postcode district: YO22
- Police: North Yorkshire
- Fire: North Yorkshire
- Ambulance: Yorkshire
- UK Parliament: Scarborough and Whitby

Hawsker is the name for the combined villages of High and Low Hawsker that straddle the A171 road 2.5 miles (4 km) southeast of Whitby, in North Yorkshire, England.

== History ==
The name Hawsker derives from Old Norse and means Haukr's enclosure. The settlement was listed in the Domesday Book as belonging to Earl Hugh in Nortreding.

Hawsker was originally in the parish of Whitby, but in 1878 it was split off into its own parish (Hawsker-cum-Stainsacre) along with neighbouring hamlet of Stainsacre where the parish church, All Saints' Church, Hawsker, is located. the population of the parish is 790 and includes the hamlet of Stainsacre and the wider parish which amounts to over 4,000 acres (1,600 ha) in area.

The two settlements of High and Low Hawsker are divided by the A171 road between Whitby and Scarborough; Low Hawsker lies to the west of the road and High Hawsker lies to the east. Low Hawsker used to have a working windmill; this was built in 1861 by George Burnett and was known to be in use up until 1915. The upper storeys were removed in 1960, but the lower portion is still in the village.

There is a caravan park on the southern boundary of the settlement, York House, and 2 caravan parks on the eastern boundary, Northcliffe and Seaview.

Between July 1885 and March 1965, Hawsker had a station on the Scarborough & Whitby Railway line. The track was left in situ for potash traffic that never was realised, however, a new potash mine at Sneatonthorpe (to the west) is due to open for mining in 2021. The trackbed is now the Cinder Track, a long-distance path and cycleway, with the old station now housing a cycle hire business.

There is a primary school in the village that caters to students from the Hawsker-cum-Stainsacre parish and was rated as being 'Good' by Ofsted in 2013. Caedmon College and Eskdale School, both in Whitby, provide secondary education for students from Hawsker and Stainsacre.

An hourly bus service connects the village with Whitby, Robin Hood's Bay, and Scarborough. This is increased to half-hourly through the summer daytime.

== See also ==
- Listed buildings in Hawsker-cum-Stainsacre
