= St Mary's Lighthouse =

Lighthouse at North Tyneside, Tyne and Wear, England

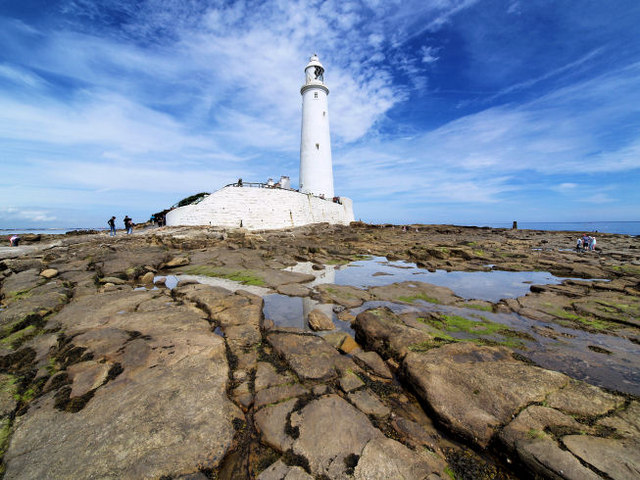
- The lighthouse in 2007
- Location: St Mary's Island; Tyne and Wear; England
- OS grid: NZ3525075397
- Coordinates: 55.071656°N 1.449444°W

Tower
- Constructed: 1898
- Construction: brick tower
- Automated: 1982
- Height: 46 metres (151 ft)
- Shape: tapered cylindrical tower with balcony and lantern
- Markings: white tower and lantern
- Operator: North Tyneside Borough Council
- Heritage: Grade II listed

Light
- Deactivated: 1984
- Range: 17 nmi (31 km; 20 mi)
- Characteristic: Fl(2) W 20s.

St Mary's Lighthouse is on the tiny St Mary's (or Bait) Island, just north of Whitley Bay on the coast of North East England. The small rocky tidal island is linked to the mainland by a short concrete causeway which is submerged at high tide.

== History ==
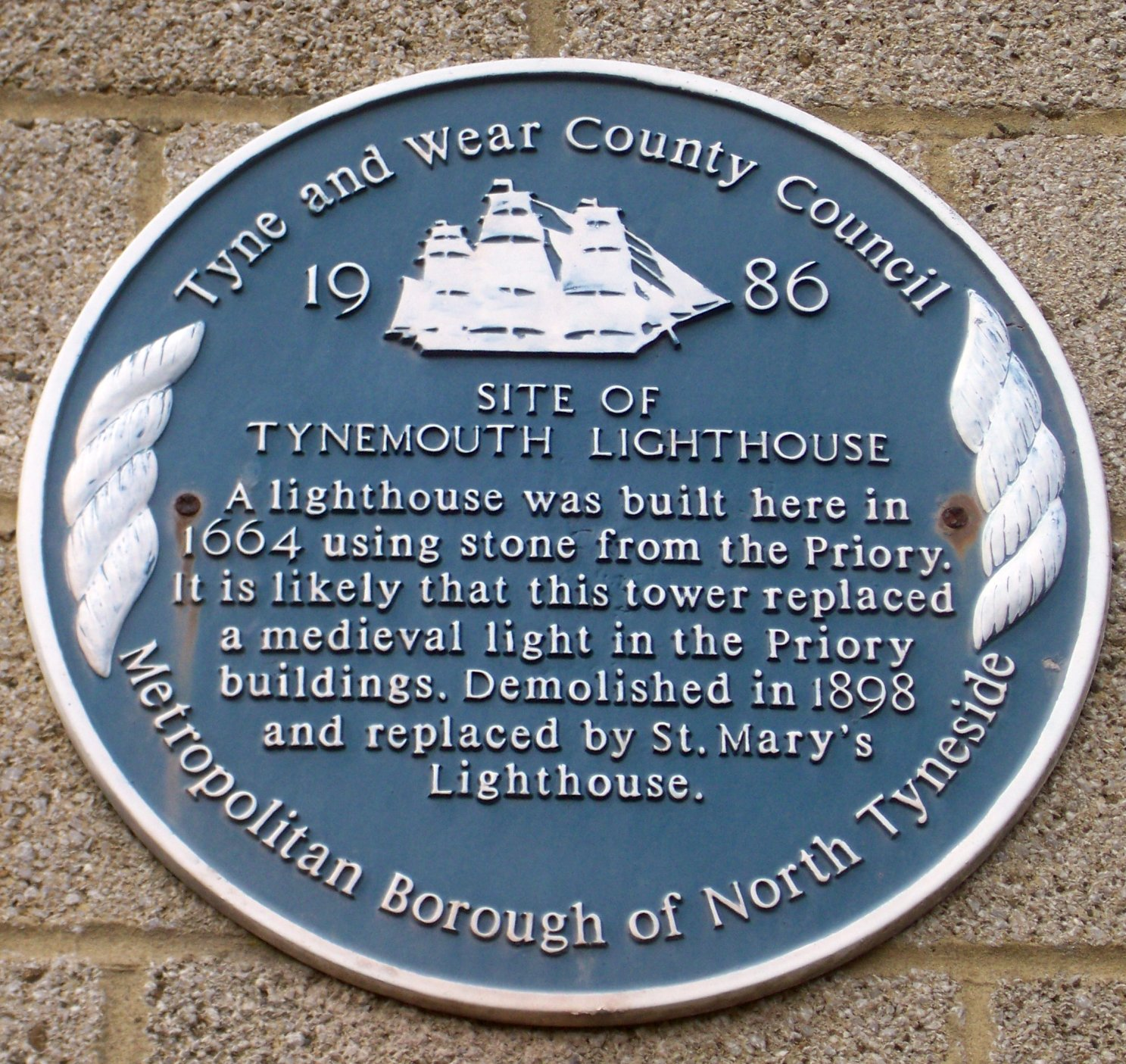
The light before St. Mary's Lighthouse

The first light in the area was in Tynemouth Priory - an 11th-century monastic chapel, whose monks maintained a lantern on the tower to warn passing ships of the danger of the rocks. A lighthouse was built on the site of the current Tynemouth Coastguard station in 1664 using stone from the priory. This lighthouse was demolished when the new lighthouse and adjacent keepers' cottages were built in 1898 on St Mary's Island by the John Miller company of Tynemouth, using 645 blocks of stone and 750,000 bricks. A first-order 'bi-valve' rotating optic was installed by Barbier & Bénard of Paris, very similar to the one they had provided the previous year for Lundy North Lighthouse; it displayed a group-flashing characteristic, flashing twice every 20 seconds. The lamp was powered by paraffin, and was not electrified until 1977; St Mary's was by then the last Trinity House lighthouse lit by oil.

As part of the electrification process the fine first-order fresnel lens was removed by Trinity House (it was later put on display in their National Lighthouse Museum in Penzance). Its place in the tower was taken by a four-tier revolving sealed beam lamp array, manufactured by Pharos Marine; it was powered by two 12-volt batteries, charged from the mains electricity supply.

== Decommissioning ==
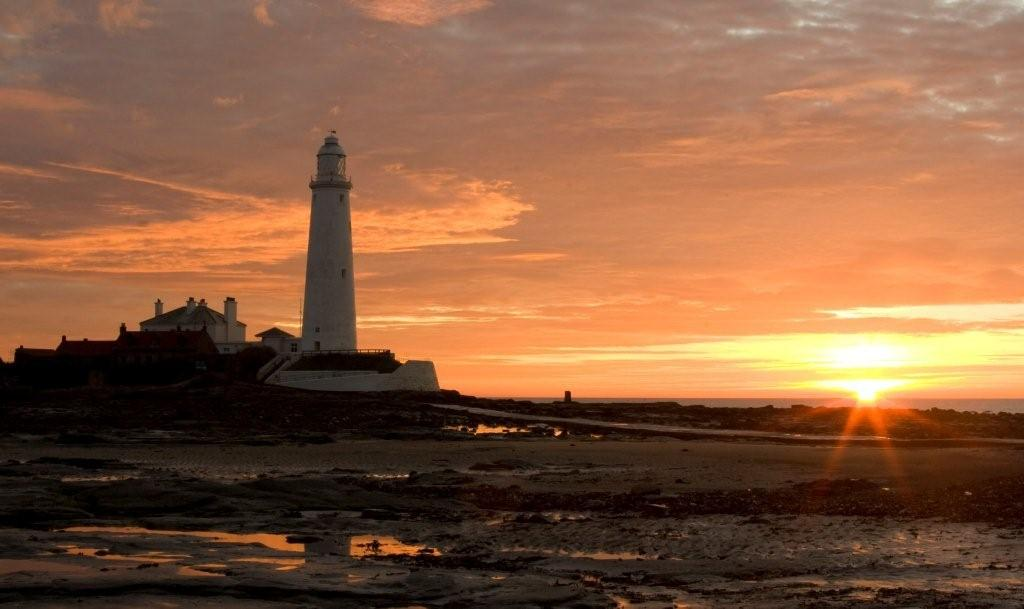
Lighthouse at Sunrise

The lighthouse was decommissioned in 1984 (two years after its conversion to automatic operation). The revolving sealed beam array was reused two years later (in reduced form) on the Inner Dowsing light platform in the North Sea, as part of its conversion to become 'the first major lighthouse to be run using solar power'. In 1986 a blue plaque was created to record its early history.

A few years later, St Mary's was opened as a visitor attraction by the local council. In place of the original optic, Trinity House offered a smaller one from their decommissioned lighthouse at Withernsea, and this can still be seen at the top of the tower.

Following closure of the Penzance lighthouse museum, the original lens was returned to St Mary's in 2011 to be put on display.

== The lighthouse today ==
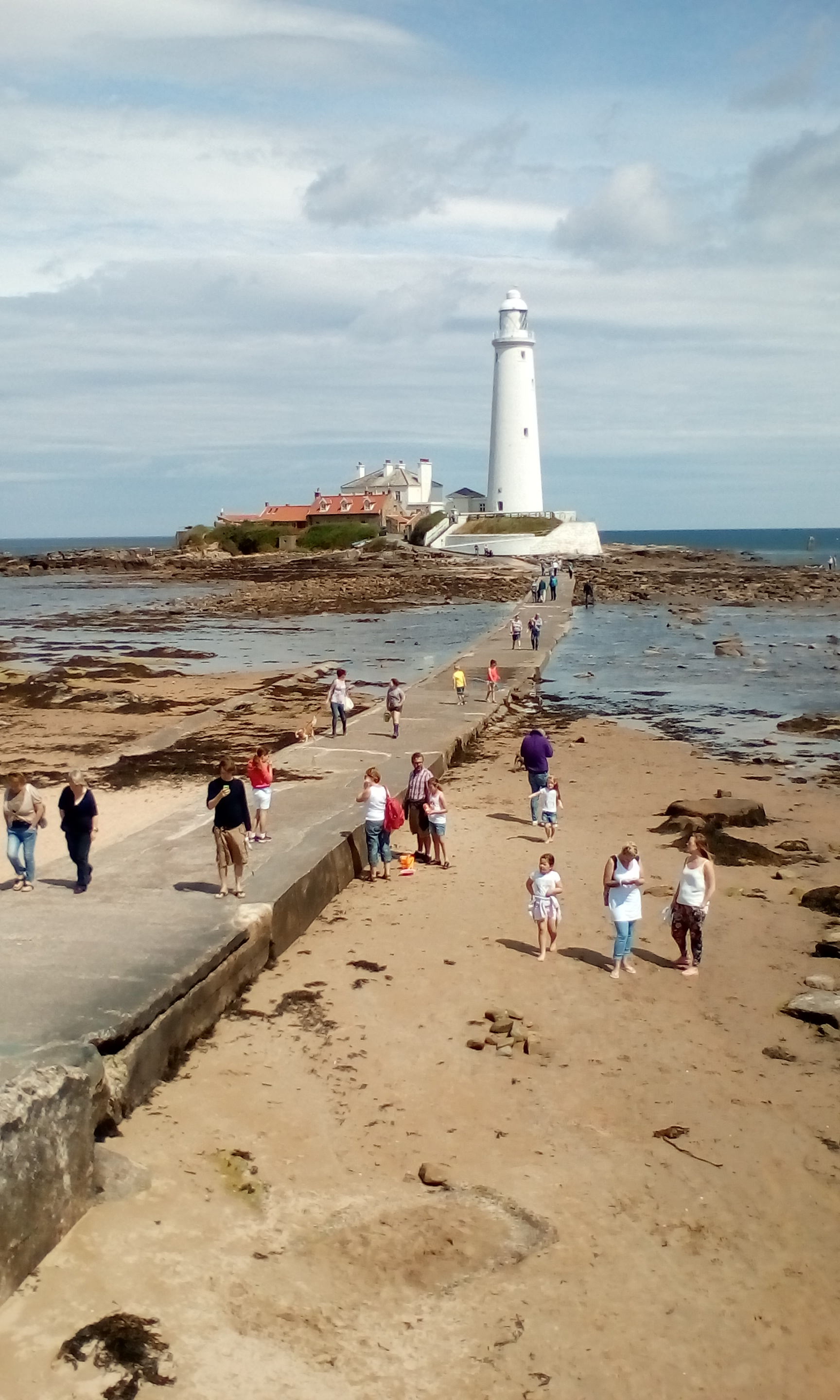
The lighthouse at low tide.

Since 2012 St Mary's lighthouse has been grade II listed. While it no longer functions as a working lighthouse, it is easily accessible (when the tide is out) and regularly open to visitors; in addition to the lighthouse itself there is a small museum, a visitor's centre, and a café. The cottage was upgraded with a wood pellet boiler in 2014.

In 2017 a renovation plan for the site (including roof-top viewing platforms and various glass-covered extensions) was rejected by the local planning authority due to environmental concerns. A new refurbishment proposal (to include rebuilding the original optic) was presented in 2018; however the Heritage Lottery Fund later turned down North Tyneside Council's £2.1m funding application. In 2024 the lighthouse and keepers' cottages were repainted and general repairs were carried out.

=== Other nearby lighthouses ===
Another Victorian lighthouse may be found a few miles to the south of the River Tyne: Souter Lighthouse is also now decommissioned, and open to visitors (it can be seen with the naked eye from the top of St Mary's Lighthouse). Pierhead lighthouses at Tynemouth and South Shields mark the entrance to the River Tyne. To the north, Trinity House maintains two operational lighthouses on the Farne Islands.

== See also ==
- List of lighthouses in England
