= Withernsea Lighthouse =

Lighthouse in the East Riding of Yorkshire, England

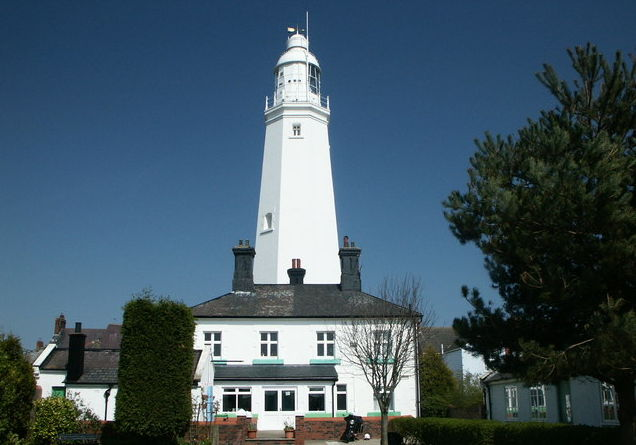
- Location: Withernsea; East Riding of Yorkshire; England
- OS grid: TA3393327967
- Coordinates: 53.730953°N 0.028751°E

Tower
- Constructed: 1894
- Construction: brick tower
- Height: 128 feet (39 m)
- Shape: tapered octagonal prism with balcony and lantern
- Markings: white tower and lantern
- Operator: Withernsea Lighthouse Museum
- Heritage: Grade II listed building

Light
- Deactivated: 1976

Withernsea Lighthouse is an inland lighthouse that stands in the middle of the town of Withernsea in the East Riding of Yorkshire, England. The lighthouse stands 127 feet (38 m) high and took 18 months to build between 1892 and 1894. Formerly owned and run by Trinity House of London, it ceased operation on 1 July 1976 and is now used as a museum.

== History ==
The lighthouse is distanced nearly 1/4 mile or 400 metres from the sea front. At the time it was built, there was nothing between it and the sea but sand dunes, and fear of coastal erosion led to it being positioned well back. The lantern atop the tower and the Fresnel lens optic within it both came 'second-hand' from the old North Lighthouse at High Whitby, which had been decommissioned shortly before the building work at Withernsea began.

Initially, the light was provided by an eight-wick paraffin lamp, which was set within the fixed first-order catadioptric optic (which had been designed and manufactured by Chance Brothers in 1858). It was an occulting light, the lamp being eclipsed three times in quick succession every minute; the occulting mechanism was clockwork. A petroleum vapour lamp was introduced in the early 20th century; the triple-occulting arrangement remained in place until 1936.

In 1936 the light was electrified: it was given a 100 volt, 1500 watt bulb set within an eight-sided revolving third order Fresnel lens array, which displayed a white flash every three seconds with a range of 17 nautical miles (31 km; 20 mi). Withernsea was the first lighthouse in the North of England to be converted from oil to electricity. It ran off mains electricity, but if the main lamp failed an automatic lamp changer brought a battery-powered lamp into action. This arrangement, provided by the Chloride Electrical Storage Company, was said to be 'the first electrical emergency lighting system to be adopted by Trinity House for a lighthouse'. A similar system was installed at Lowestoft two years later, and subsequently it was widely adopted across the service.

The lens weighed two tons and floated in a mercury bath; it was turned by clockwork. The lighting system, lens and clockwork mechanism remained in use into the 1970s. Before decommissioning in 1976, the lighthouse was operated as a 'man-and-wife station', run by a couple who were accommodated in the adjacent cottage.

== Lighthouse today ==
The base of the lighthouse features RNLI and HM Coastguard exhibits, with models and old photographs. These record the history of ship-wrecks in the area and detail the Withernsea lifeboats and crews who saved 87 lives between 1862 and 1913. It also depicts the history of the nearby Spurn lifeboats.

The local history room has Victorian and Edwardian photos of the town including the pier and railway. There is a Kay Kendall memorial to the 1950s film star, who was born in the town.

The lighthouse has antennae attached used to provide local mobile phone coverage.

Views from the lamp room in the Withernsea Lighthouse are available to visitors after climbing the 144 steps. There is no lamp, as this was removed after closure and sent to St Mary's Lighthouse in Tyne and Wear where it can still be seen to this day.

The lighthouse and adjoining lighthouse keepers' houses are Grade II listed buildings.

== Tolkien Two Towers inspiration theory ==
During the First World War J. R. R. Tolkien was stationed for a time at Thirtle Bridge only a mile or so from Withernsea. It is well documented that he found inspiration, created languages and wrote stories while in the area. A book detailing the Tolkien Triangle in East Yorkshire contains many such references. One of the most well documented inspirations relates to when Tolkien watched his wife Edith sing and dance in the woods adjacent to Roos church near where she stayed while Tolkien was stationed in East Yorkshire which gave him the inspiration for the Elven princess Lúthien Tinúviel. A number of articles have been written based on the information in the book including 'Dreaming shires: how East Yorkshire shaped Tolkiens Middle-earth fantasy' and 'How East Yorkshire inspired the worlds of The Hobbit and Lord of the Rings'.

From Thirtle Bridge the lighthouse at Withernsea stands tall on the horizon less than 2 miles away. The Black Mill at Waxholme, while not as tall, but sited halfway between the two has a strong influence on the view from Thirtle Bridge standing as it does on high ground. These two 'towers' have been put forward as possible inspiration for Tolkiens The Two Towers by Michael Flowers of the Tolkien Society. Author of 'Tolkien in Holderness', Phil Mathison also suggests the Lighthouse and Mill as possible inspirations for the Towers themselves.

The mill is referenced as possible inspiration for the Two Towers themselves by local Tolkien author Phil Mathison in his book 'Tolkien in Holderness', an excerpt of which discussing the mill and lighthouse was published in the Holderness Gazette. Michael Flowers of the Tolkien Society notes that in Tolkiens drawings of the Two Towers, the White Tower is always depicted looking remarkably lighthouse like, this can be seen most compellingly in the original cover Tolkien created for the Two Towers book, a cover which was rejected by the publishers but which HarperCollins resurrected in 1998 for their 3 volume print. As can be seen in the gallery below, the comparisons between the cover, the lighthouse and the mill are striking. Aside from the obvious identical colouring and the lighthouse like white tower, the windows in the illustration which appear to have a similar distribution to the windows in each of the buildings, even a similarity between the raised doorway to the Black Tower with steps leading up replicating the entranceway to the Black Mill.

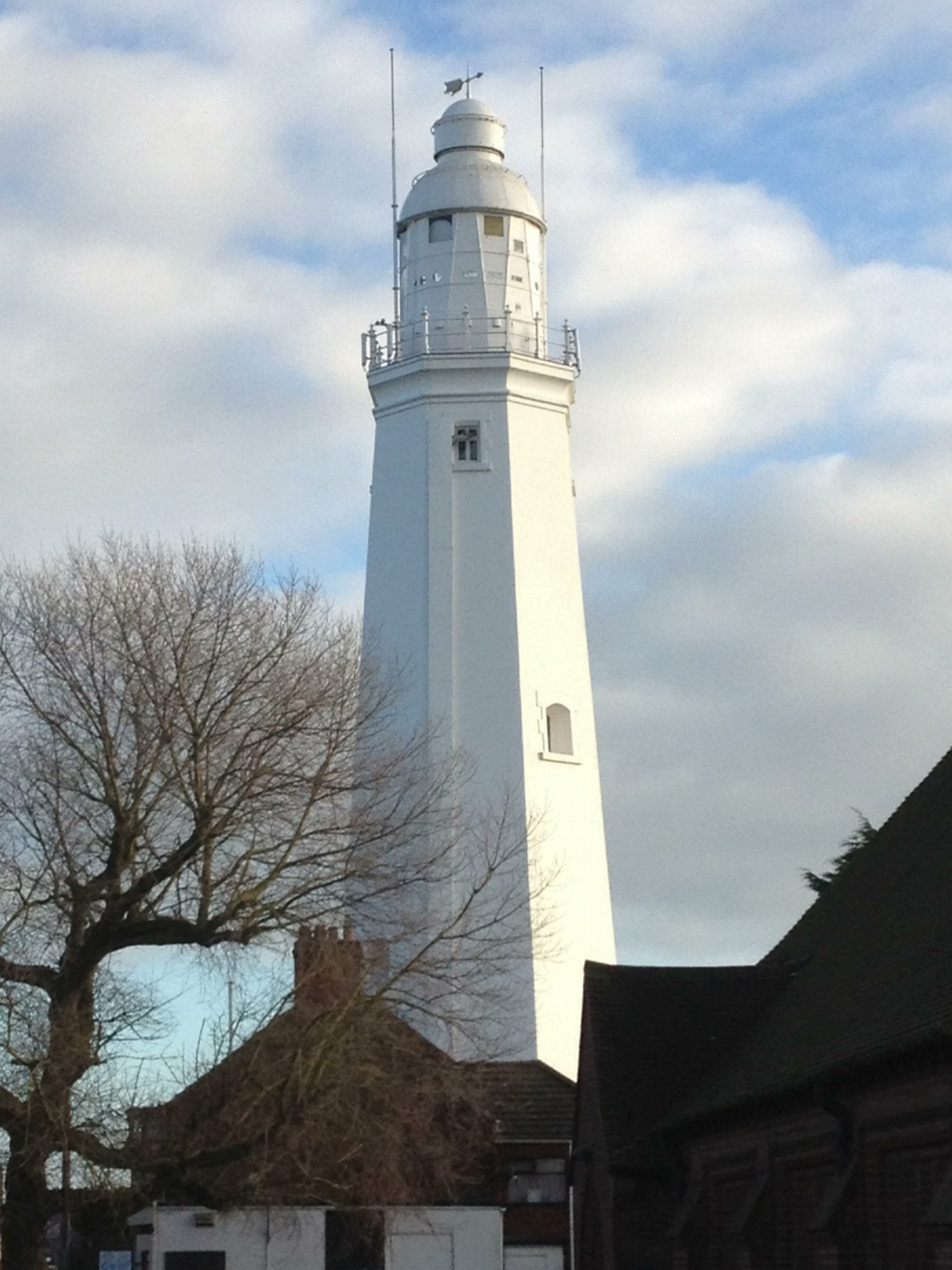
Withernsea Lighthouse taken from Hull Road in 2012

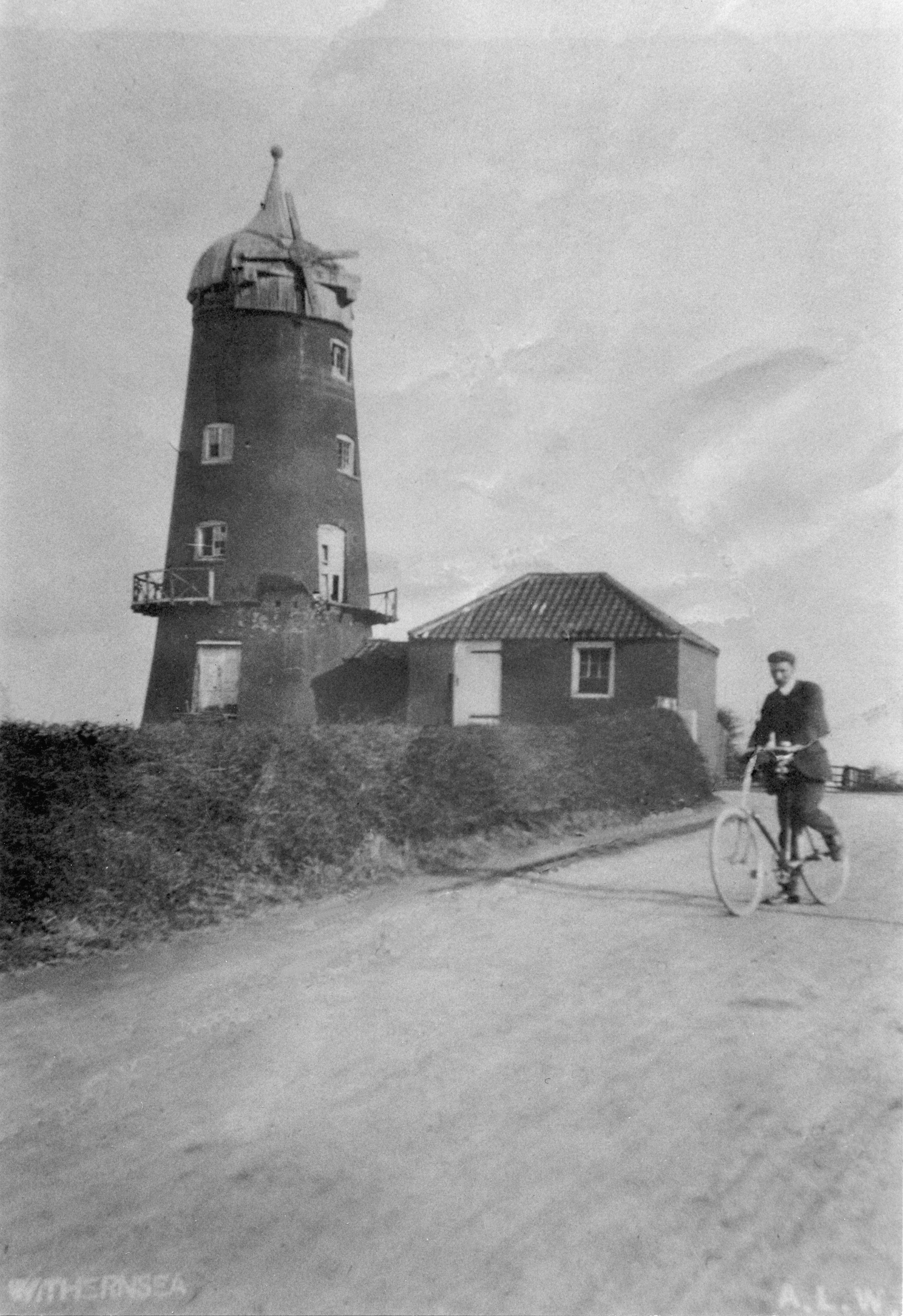
Black Mill, Waxholme taken in 1905 after the sails had been removed but before the top was removed by the army in the First World War.

There are other possibilities in the Midlands that have been put forward but these are the only two towers with distinct colouring similar to the descriptions in the book.

== Gallery ==
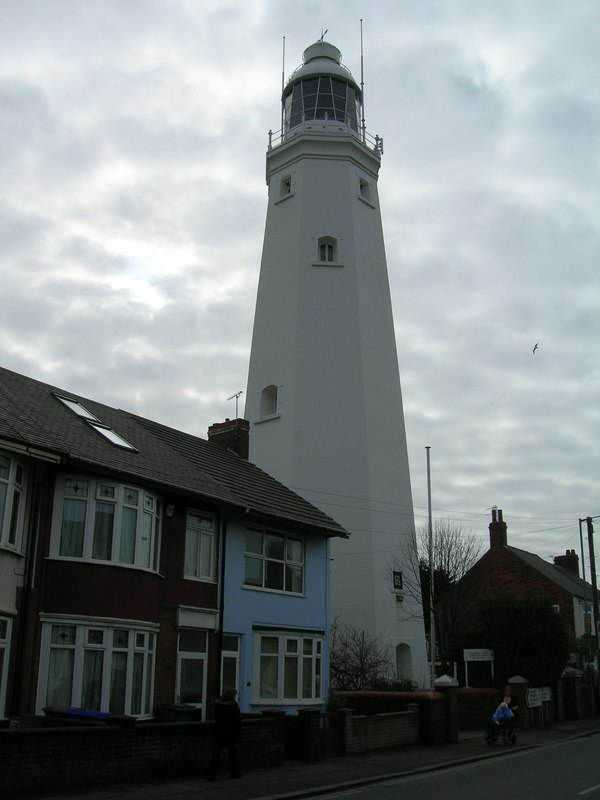
As seen from the street

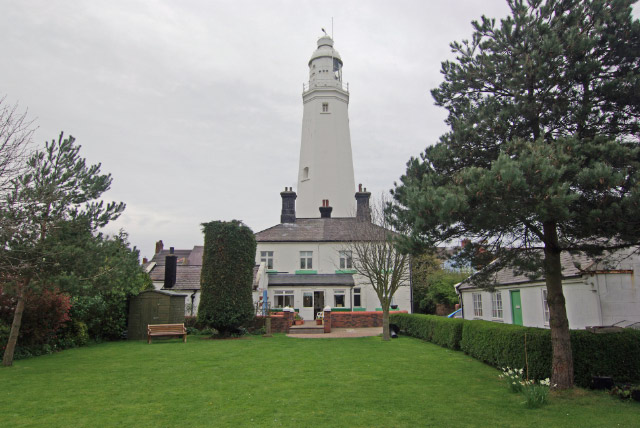
Garden view of the lighthouse and keepers' cottage

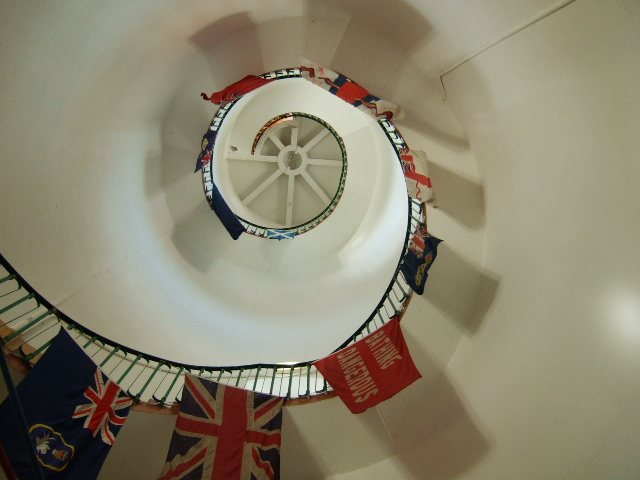
Steps inside the lighthouse

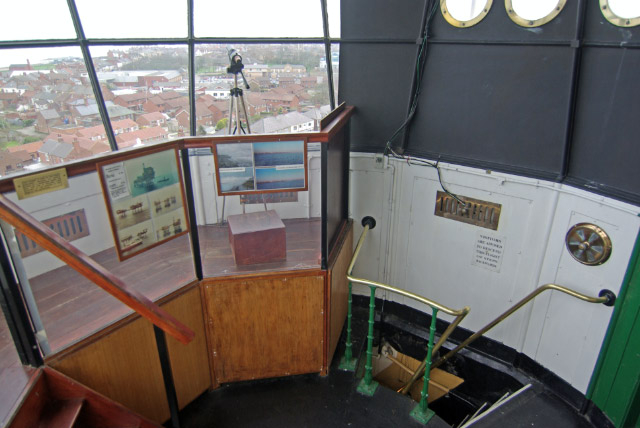
The view from the top

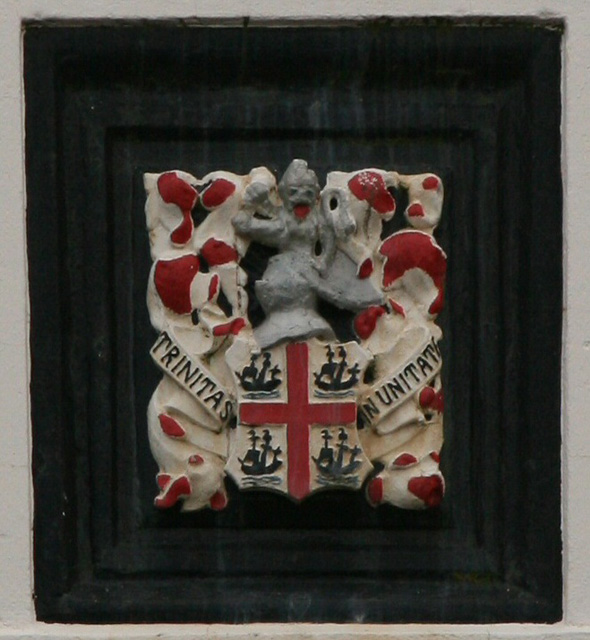
Trinity House plaque on the tower

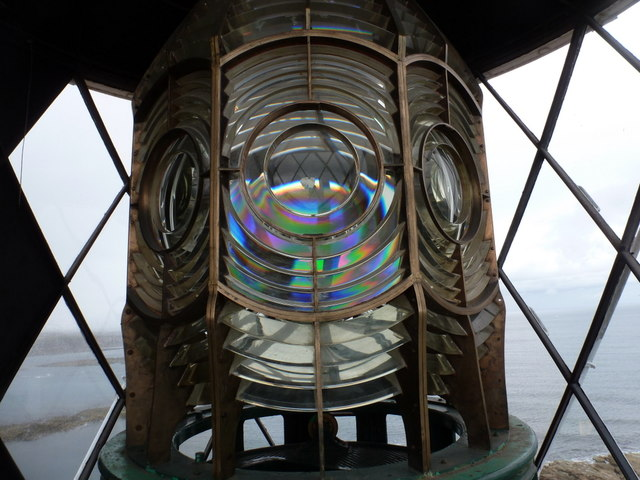
The old Withernsea optic (now in St Mary's Lighthouse, Whitley Bay)

== See also ==
- List of lighthouses in England
- Listed buildings in Withernsea
