= Holderness Gazette =

The Holderness Gazette (established 1910) is a weekly newspaper distributed to the communities of Holderness in the East Riding of Yorkshire, England.

The Holderness Gazette publishes weekly on Thursdays with two editions representing the area: The Holderness and Hornsea, and Withernsea edition.

2021 - Editor Sam Hawcroft.

The gazette prints poetry by local poet, Dean Wilson.

The paper's office is situated in Withernsea.
