= Withernsea railway station =

Disused railway station in the East Riding of Yorkshire, England

Withernsea
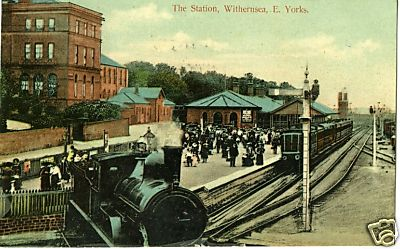

General information
- Location: Withernsea, East Riding of Yorkshire; England
- Coordinates: 53.7288°N 0.0350°E
- Grid reference: TA 342 277
- Platforms: 3

Other information
- Status: Disused

History
- Original company: Hull and Holderness Railway
- Pre-grouping: North Eastern Railway
- Post-grouping: London and North Eastern Railway

Key dates
- 1854: Opened
- 1964: Closed to passengers
- 1965: closed completely
Location

Withernsea railway station is a disused railway station that was the terminus of the North Eastern Railway's Hull and Holderness Railway in Withernsea, East Riding of Yorkshire, England. It was opened by the Hull and Holderness Railway on 27 June 1854.

The station was closed to passengers on 19 October 1964 and to goods traffic on 3 May 1965.

Preceding station	Disused railways	Following station
Hollym Gate	North Eastern Railway; Hull and Holderness Railway	Terminus
