= All Saints' Church, Hawsker =

Church in Hawsker, North Yorkshire, England

Coordinates: 54°27′44″N 0°34′44″W

The church, in 2012

All Saints' Church is the parish church of Hawsker, a village in North Yorkshire, in England.

The first chapel in Hawsker was built in the Anglo-Saxon period, from which a cross-shaft survives. A new chapel, dedicated to All Saints, was built by Aschetin de Hawsker in the 1140s. It survived into the 16th century, but no trace of it now remains. The current church was built between 1876 and 1877, to a design by E. H. Smales. Originally in the parish of St Mary's Church, Whitby, it was given its own parish in 1878. The church was grade II listed in 1989.

The church is in sandstone and has slate roofs with red ridge tiles. It consists of a nave, a south porch, a central tower, and a chancel with a north organ chamber and vestry. The tower has buttresses, a gabled staircase turret, lancet bell openings, and a steeply hipped roof with finials and a cross. The porch is gabled and timber framed, and the doorway has an ogee-arched head and a tympanum containing the date. Inside, there are several stained glass windows, various wall monuments, two original brass candelabra.

== See also ==
- Listed buildings in Hawsker-cum-Stainsacre
