= SFMBT1 =

Protein-coding gene in humans

Identifiers
- Aliases: SFMBT1, RU1, SFMBT, hSFMBT, Scm-like with four mbt domains 1, Scm like with four mbt domains 1
- External IDs: OMIM: 607319; MGI: 1859609; GeneCards: SFMBT1

Gene location (Human)
Chr.	Chromosome 3 (human)
Band	3p21.1	Start	52,903,572 bp
Band	3p21.1	End	53,046,750 bp

Gene location (Mouse)
Chr.	Chromosome 14 (mouse)
Band	14 B|14 18.99 cM	Start	30,436,806 bp
Band	14 B|14 18.99 cM	End	30,544,678 bp
RNA expression pattern
Bgee	Human / Mouse (ortholog); Top expressed in: sperm; sural nerve; oocyte; left testis; secondary oocyte; right testis; testicle; gonad; gastrocnemius muscle; islet of Langerhans / Top expressed in: zygote; secondary oocyte; primary oocyte; spermatid; spermatocyte; supraoptic nucleus; yolk sac; renal corpuscle; ascending aorta; aortic valve; More reference expression data
BioGPS	n/a
Gene ontology
Molecular function	protein binding; transcription corepressor activity; histone binding
Cellular component	nucleus; nucleoplasm
Biological process	negative regulation of muscle organ development; cell differentiation; negative regulation of transcription, DNA-templated; regulation of transcription, DNA-templated; transcription, DNA-templated; spermatogenesis; chromatin organization
Sources:Amigo / QuickGO
Orthologs
Databases	NCBI: entry; OMA: entry
Species	Human	Mouse
Entrez	51460	54650
Ensembl	ENSG00000163935	ENSMUSG00000006527
UniProt	Q9UHJ3	Q9JMD1
RefSeq (mRNA)	NM_001005158; NM_001005159; NM_016329	NM_001166531; NM_001166532; NM_019460; NM_175254
RefSeq (protein)	NP_057413	NP_001160003; NP_001160004; NP_062333
Location (UCSC)	Chr 3: 52.9 – 53.05 Mb	Chr 14: 30.44 – 30.54 Mb
PubMed search
- Wikidata
View/Edit Human	View/Edit Mouse

Scm-like with four mbt domains 1 is a protein that in humans is encoded by the SFMBT1 gene.

== Function ==
This gene shares high similarity with the Drosophila Scm (sex comb on midleg) gene. It encodes a protein which contains four malignant brain tumor repeat (mbt) domains and may be involved in antigen recognition. [provided by RefSeq, Jun 2012]. It encodes a transcriptional repressor protein. The SFMBT1 protein's interaction with cancers is unclear, but elevated levels have been recorded in some renal cancers.
