= Withernsea =

Town and civil parish in Yorkshire, England

Coordinates: 53.7285°N 0.0382°E

- Seaside town and civil parish
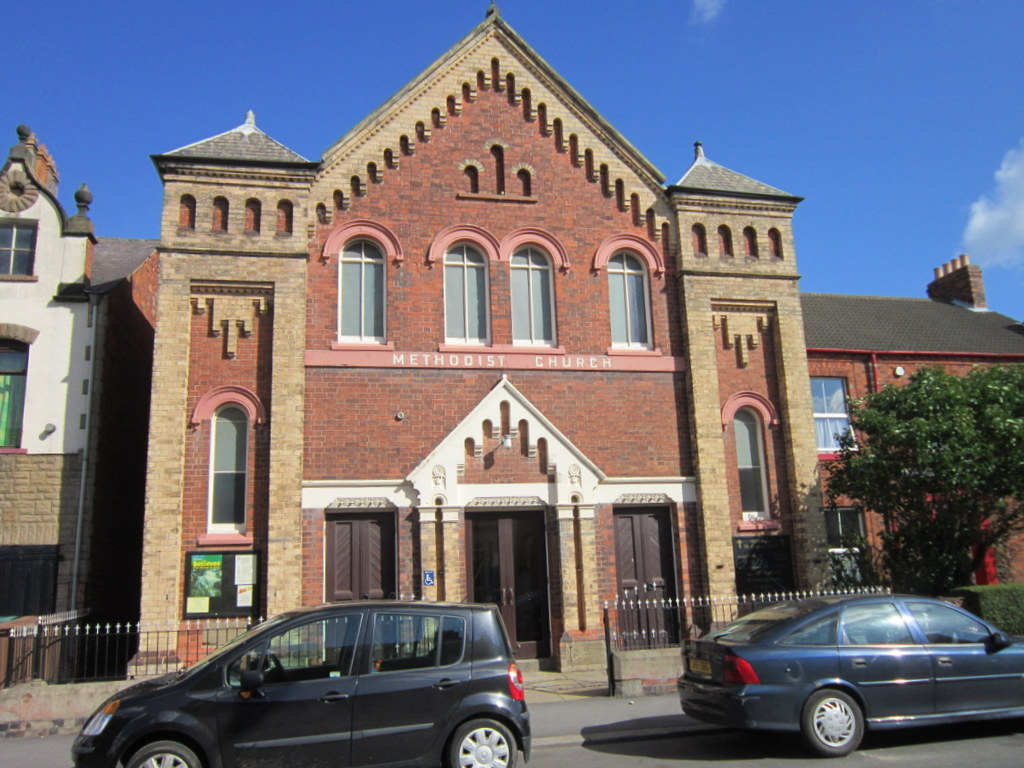
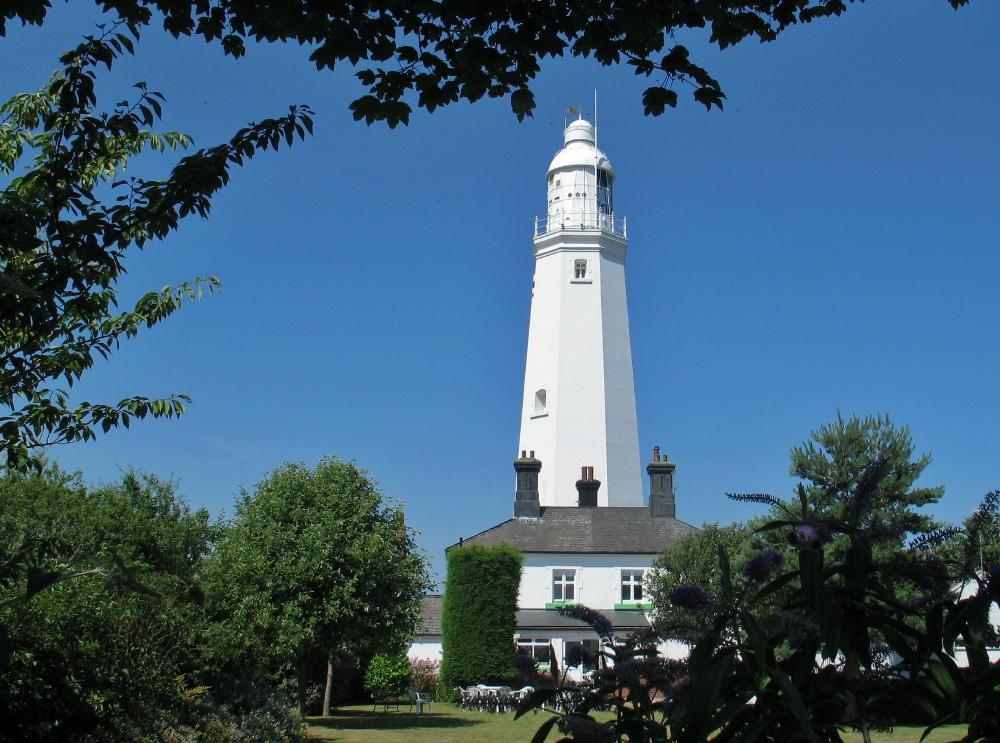
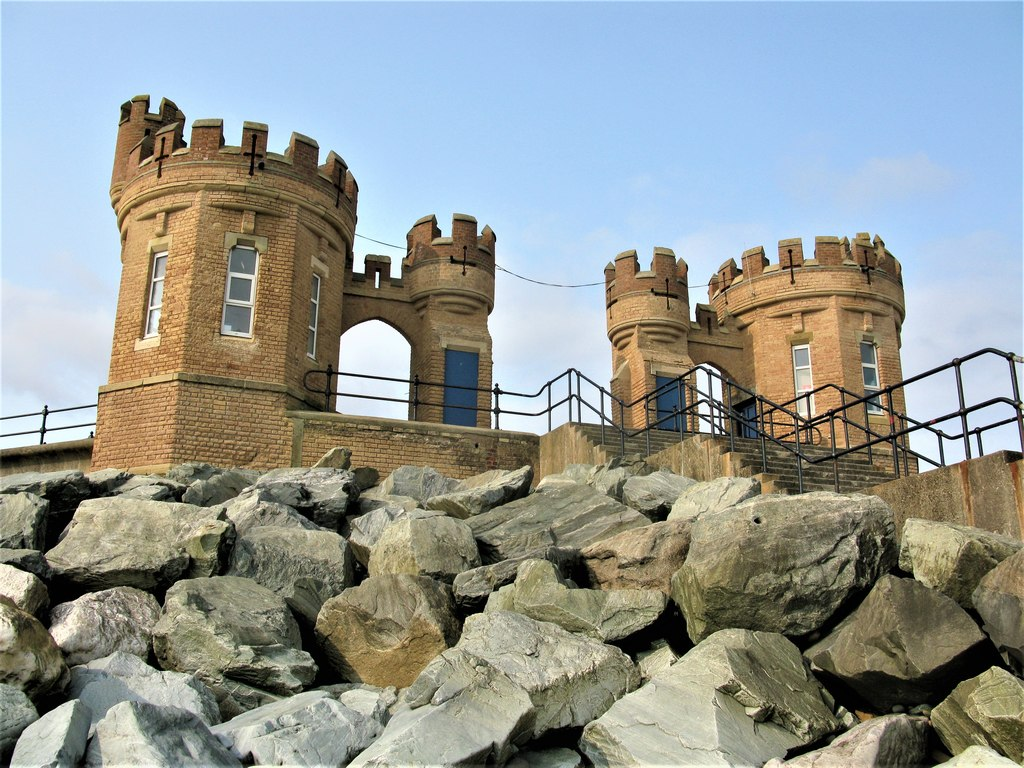
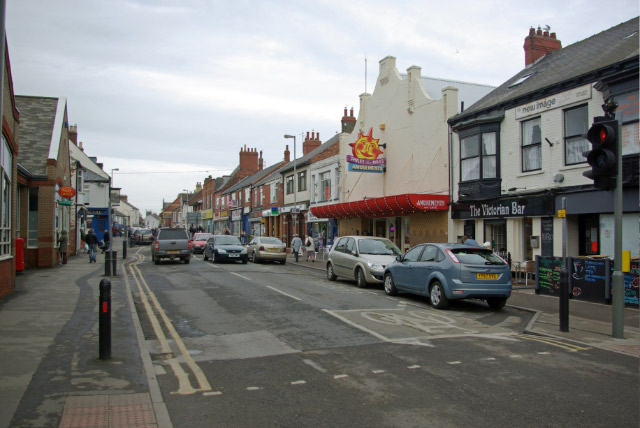
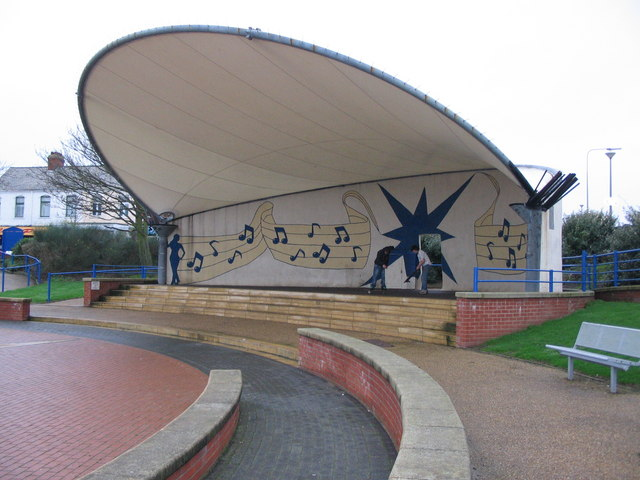
- Methodist Church The Lighthouse Pier Towers Queen Street Valley Gardens

- Location within the East Riding of Yorkshire
- Population: 6,030 (2021 Census)
- OS grid reference: TA344277
  - London: 150 mi (240 km) S
- Civil parish: Withernsea
- Unitary authority: East Riding of Yorkshire
- Ceremonial county: East Riding of Yorkshire
- Region: Yorkshire and the Humber
- Country: England
- Sovereign state: United Kingdom
- Post town: WITHERNSEA
- Postcode district: HU19
- Dialling code: 01964
- Police: Humberside
- Fire: Humberside
- Ambulance: Yorkshire
- UK Parliament: Beverley and Holderness

Withernsea /ˈwɪðərnsi/ is a seaside resort town and civil parish in Holderness, East Riding of Yorkshire, England. Its white inland lighthouse, rising around 127 feet (39 m) above Hull Road, now houses a museum to 1950s actress Kay Kendall, who was born in the town.

The Prime Meridian crosses the coast north-west of Withernsea.

At the 2021 Census, Withernsea had a population of 6,030, a decrease on the 2011 UK census figure of 6,159.

== History ==
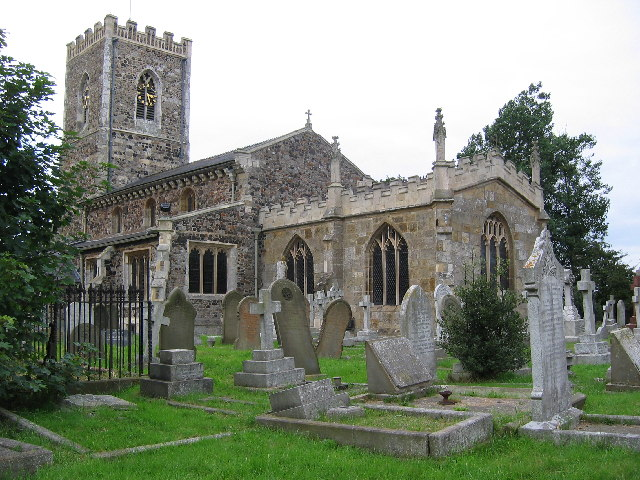
St Nicholas' Church

The name Withernsea probably derives from the Old English wiðþornsǣ meaning 'the lake near the thorn tree'.

Like many seaside resorts, Withernsea has a wide promenade which reaches north and south from Pier Towers, the historic entrance to the pier, built in 1877 at a cost of £12,000. The pier itself was originally 399 yards (365 m) long, costing £14,000 in 1878, but was gradually reduced in length through several impacts by local ships, starting with the Saffron in 1880 before the collision by an unnamed ship in 1888, again by a Grimsby fishing boat and again by the Henry Parr in 1893, leaving the pier with a mere 50 feet (15 m) of damaged wood and steel, which was removed in 1903. The Pier Towers have been refurbished.

During the mid-19th century the Hull and Holderness Railway was constructed, connecting the nearby city of Hull with Withernsea (via Keyingham and Patrington) and making possible cheap and convenient holidays for Victorian workers and their families, as well as boosting Withernsea's economy. It closed in 1964 and all that remains of it is an overgrown footpath where the track used to be.

Withernsea, like many British resorts, has suffered from a decline in the number of visiting holidaymakers.

In 1916 a flying field (Owthorne), 35 acres (14 ha) in size was established by The Admiralty on the site now occupied by Withernsea High School. From June 1918 No. 506 Special Duty Flight (No. 251 Squadron) operated from Owthorne. Another 5 acres (2 ha) of land was requisitioned and Bessonneau hangars were constructed, and the site then became classified as an aerodrome. Activities ceased in June 1919 and Flight 506 was disbanded shortly thereafter.

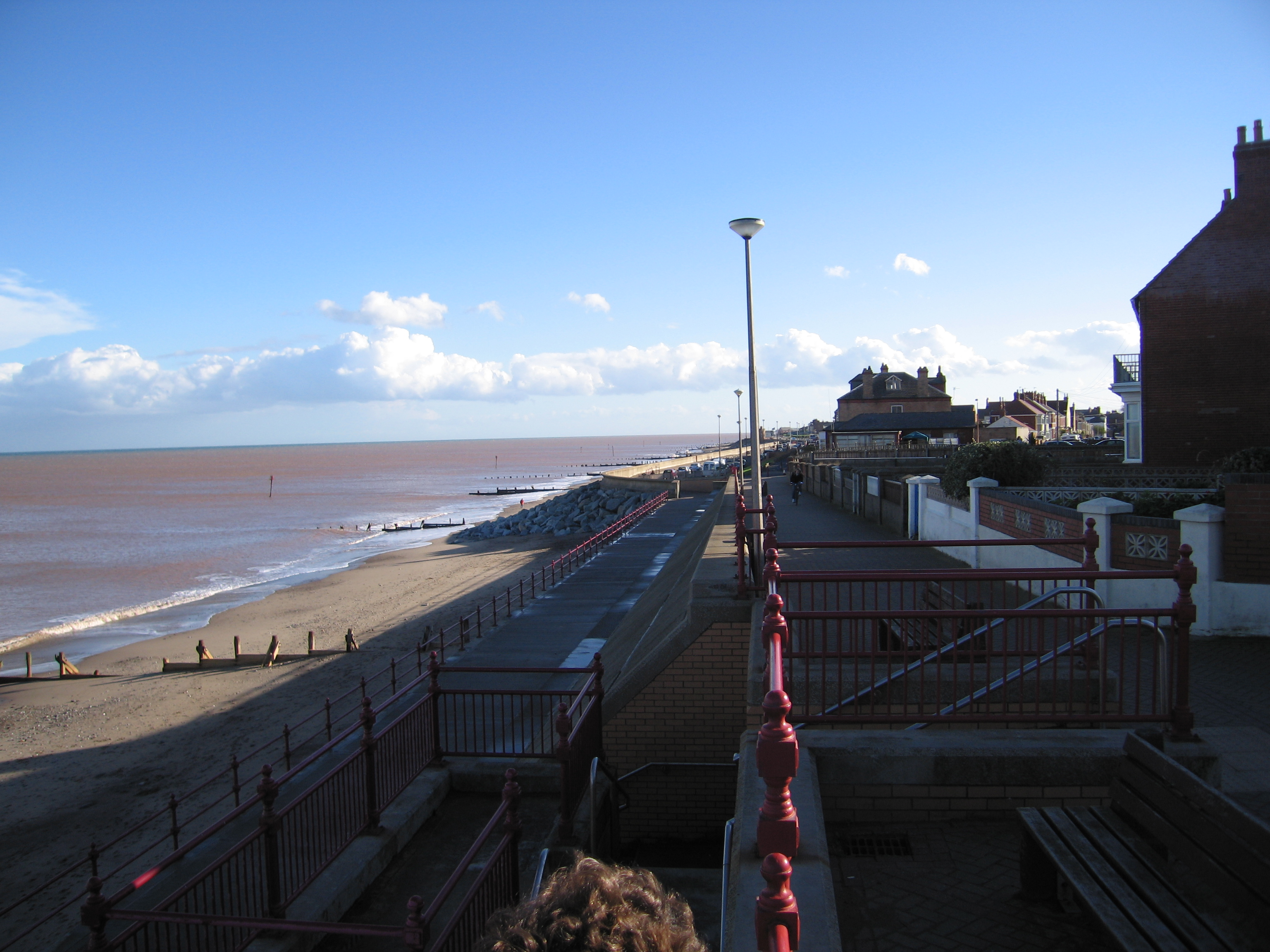
Withernsea sea front

== Economy ==
Following an unsuccessful attempt to purchase the Proudfoot Supermarket, Tesco opened a competing store which originally struggled to attract sales. Tesco resorted to a campaign of price flexing, offering customers £8 off for every £20 spent in their Withernsea branch. This led to an investigation by the Competition Commission. After their market share increased, Tesco prices returned to a level closer to the national average. Subsequently, Aldi took over the former Proudfoot supermarket, and are now offering very competitive opposition to Tesco. In the 21st century, Withernsea Town Council has bought a former pub and nightclub, centrally located opposite Aldi, and has renamed it the Meridian Centre. A lottery bid for over £400,000 – Reaching Communities building fund – was successful, and the building was refurbished to provide a community centre, including a cinema and performing arts venue by 2013.

There is a 9-hole golf course and leisure centre complex (with a gym and indoor pool) and a variety of pubs and restaurants are situated around the centre of the town.

== Landmarks ==
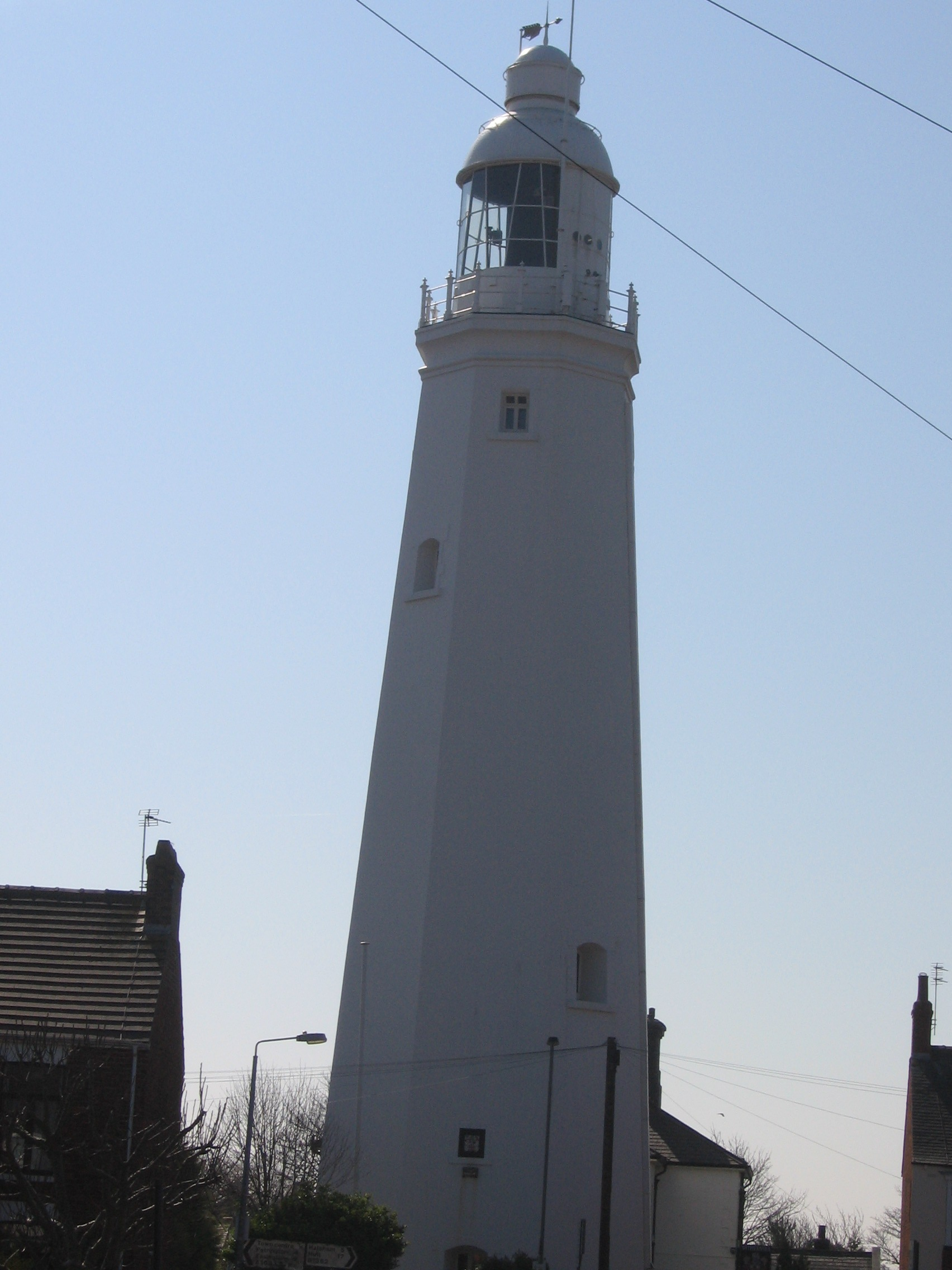
Withernsea Lighthouse

Some of the town's better-known tourist attractions and landmarks include:

- The lighthouse situated on Hull Road with a museum dedicated to the actress Kay Kendall.
- The Pier Towers leading onto a Blue Flag beach.
- Valley Gardens with a large square and outside stage for local events and celebrations.
- Various amusement arcades (informally known as 'muggies') that line the road opposite the Valley Gardens.
- An RNLI lifeboat museum.
- The parish church of St Nicholas, a Grade II* listed building.
- The Greenwich Meridian; Just outside the town.

== Media ==
Local news and television programmes are provided by BBC Yorkshire and Lincolnshire and ITV Yorkshire. Television signals are received from the Belmont TV transmitter. The area is served by BBC Radio Humberside, Hits Radio East Yorkshire & North Lincolnshire, Seaside FM, Capital Yorkshire and Greatest Hits East Yorkshire. Ofcom awarded Seaside FM a community radio licence to broadcast to the town on 105.3 MHz and the station launched on 5 October 2007 from studios at 27 Seaside Road. It ceased broadcasting in October 2022. Weekly newspaper The Holderness Gazette also has offices on Seaside Road.

== Education ==
There are a number of primary schools in Withernsea which serve the surrounding area. Withernsea High School is the main secondary provider and has a technology college. The high school was refurbished in 2015.

== Public services ==
Withernsea has its own hospital owned by the NHS which was subject to services cuts and lost its Accident and Emergency Department facility, it is now a community hospital. Withernsea has five emergency service stations located within the town, Yorkshire Ambulance Service; Humberside Fire and Rescue Service; Humberside Police; Her Majesty's Coastguard and lifeboat station.

== Notable people ==
- Birthplace of jazz musician Kenny Baker (1921–1999).
- Dick Davis, English poet, teacher, and award-winning translator of Persian poetry, grew up in Withernsea during the 1950s.
- Birthplace of footballer Stuart Gray.
- Charles Hotham was vicar of Withernsea from 1640 to 1644.
- Actress Kay Kendall was born in Withernsea in 1927.
- The Ruby Red Performers, a group of dancers who appeared on the 9th series of Britain's Got Talent in 2015, are from Withernsea.

== Gallery ==
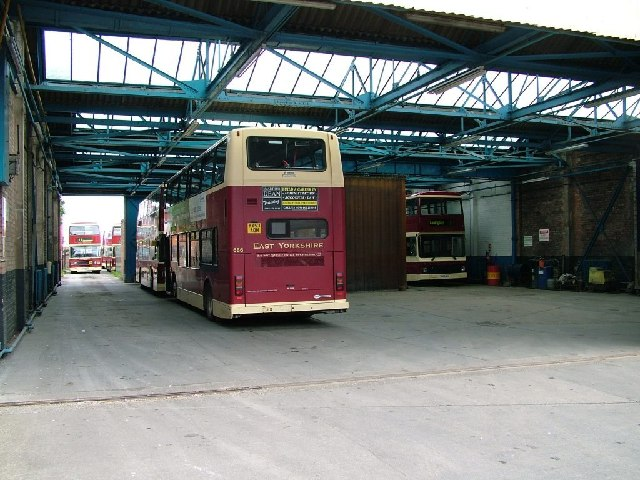
Withernsea Bus Depot

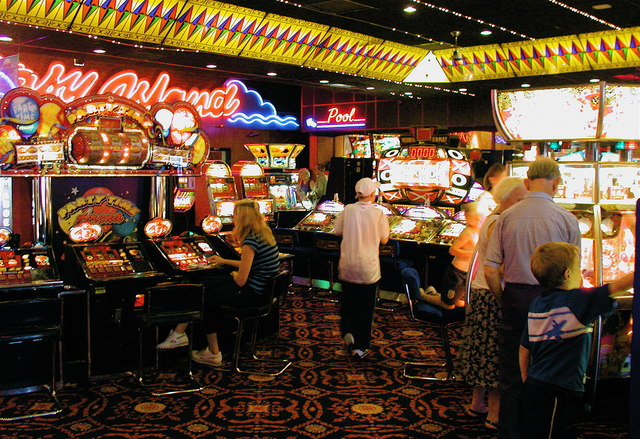
Teddy's Amusements

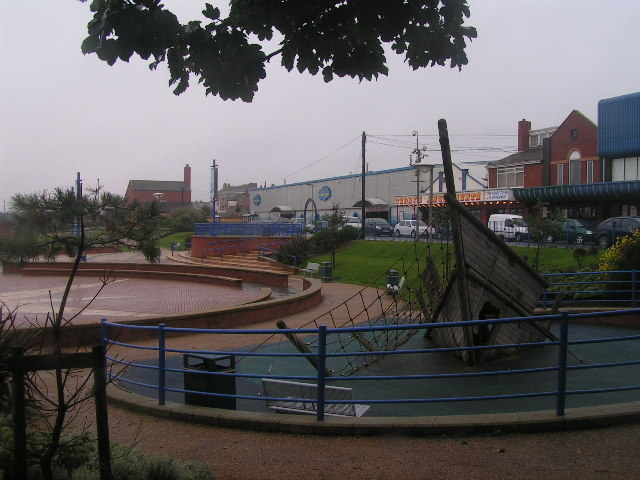
Valley Gardens

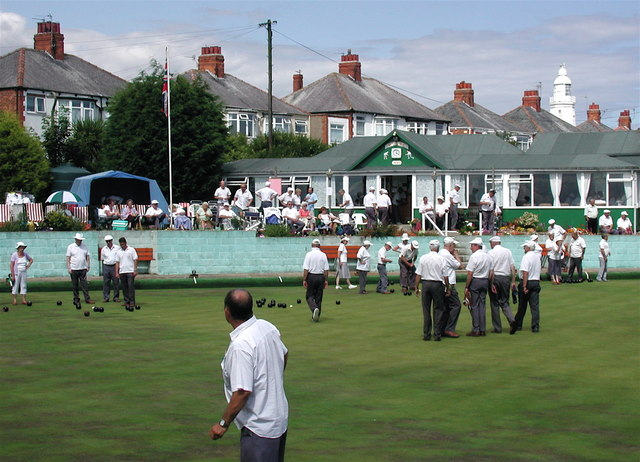
Withernsea Bowling Club

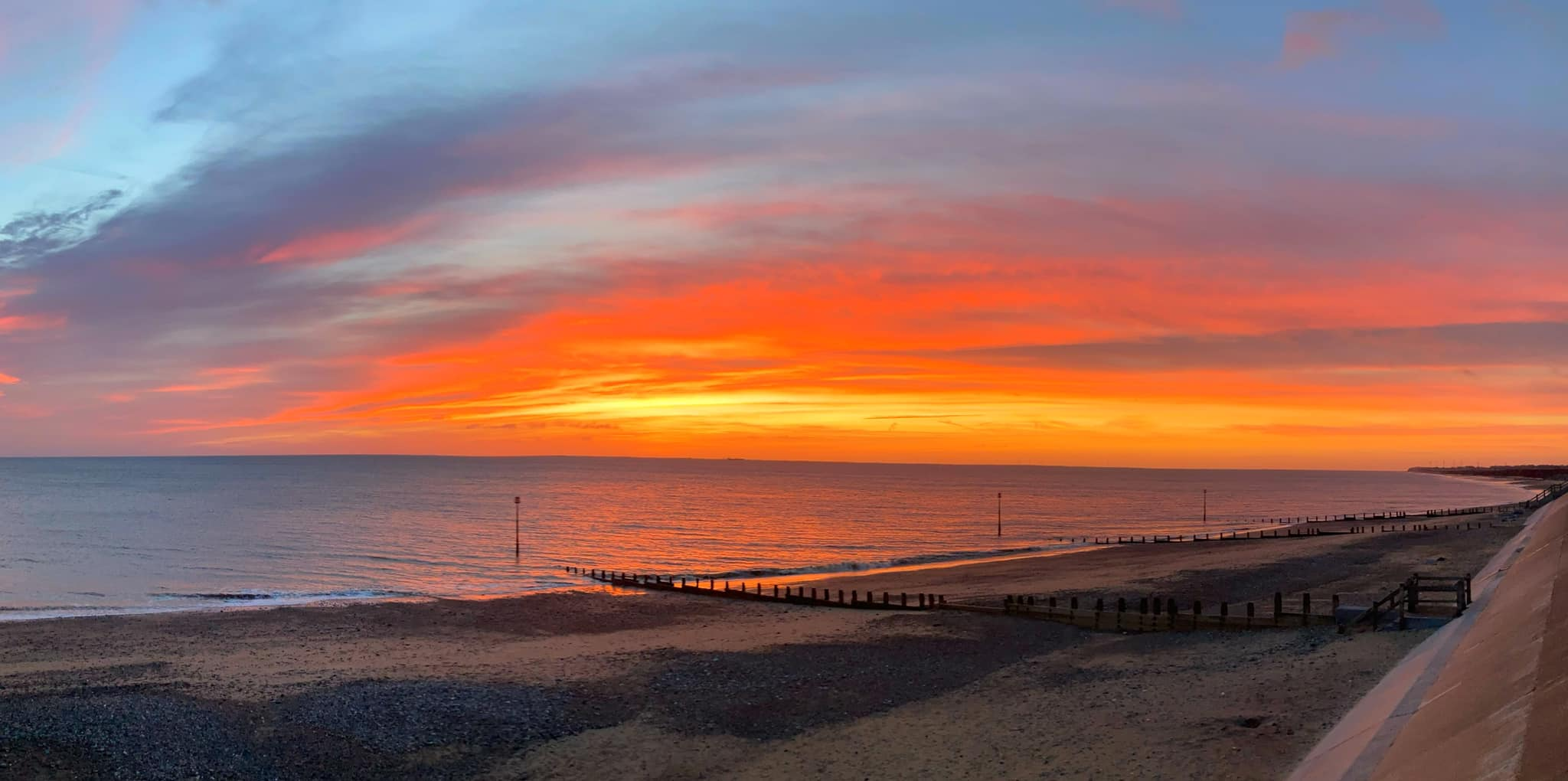
Withernsea beach, south promenade.

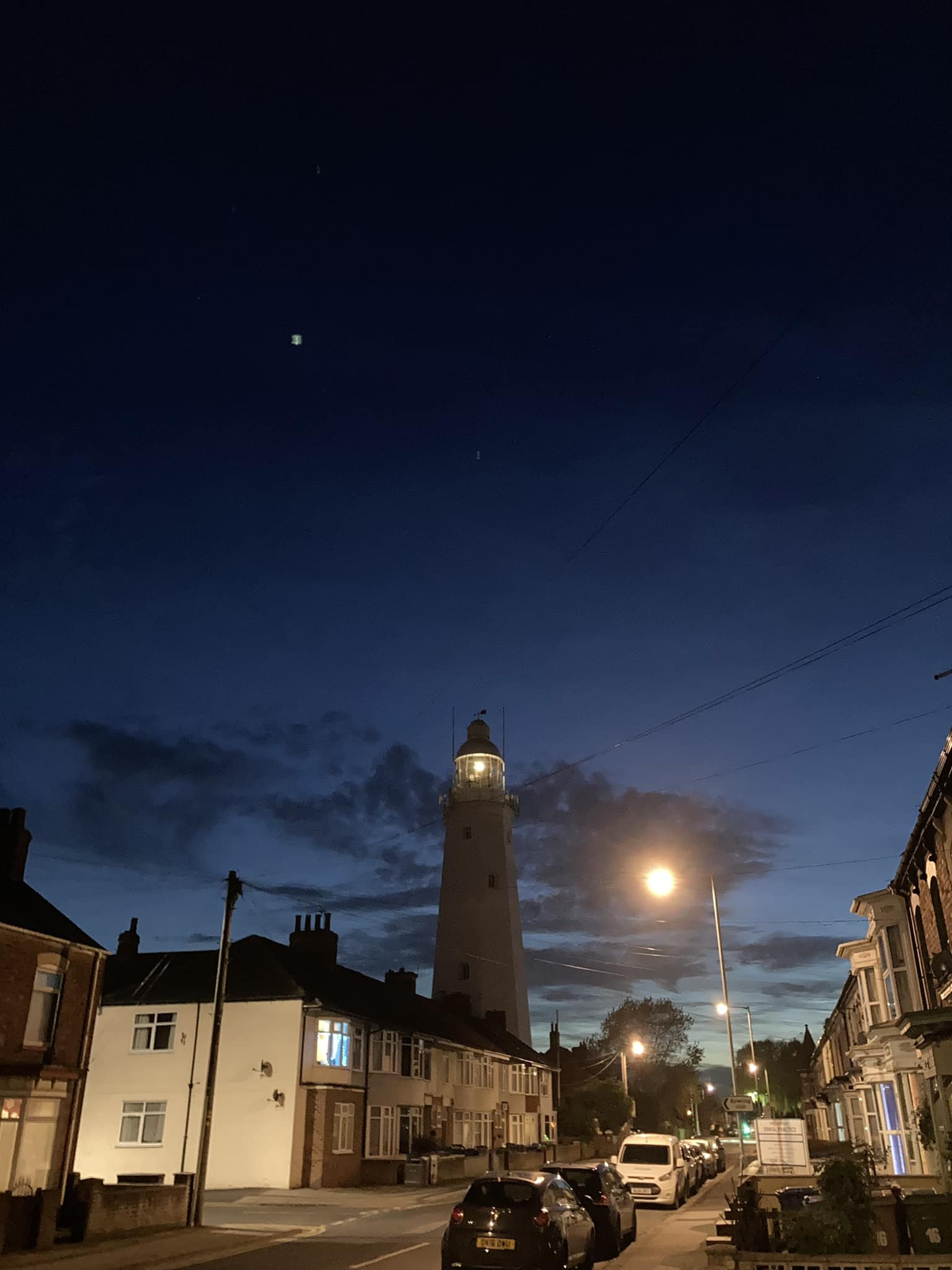
Withernsea lighthouse at night.

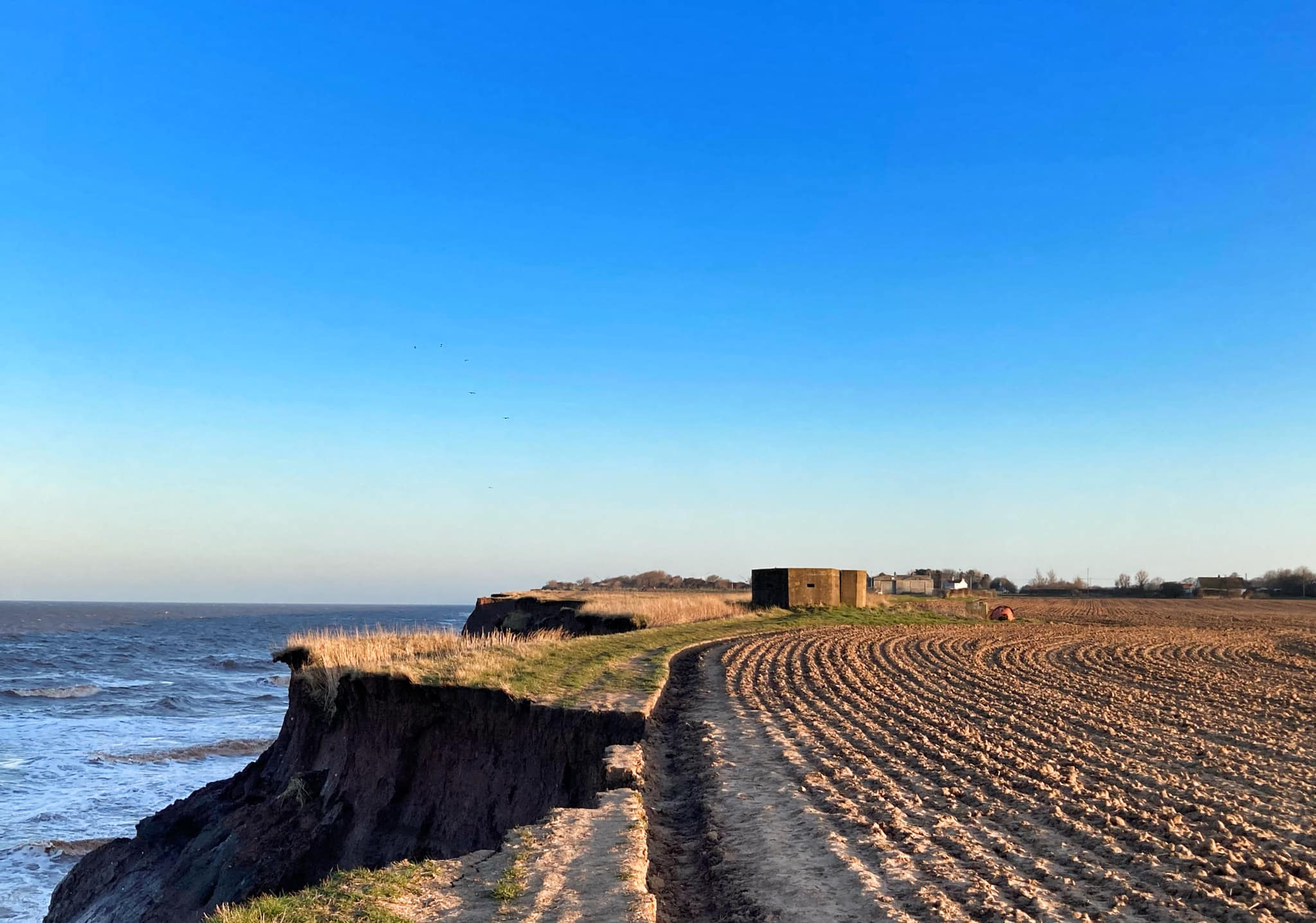
Coastal erosion to the south of Withernsea.

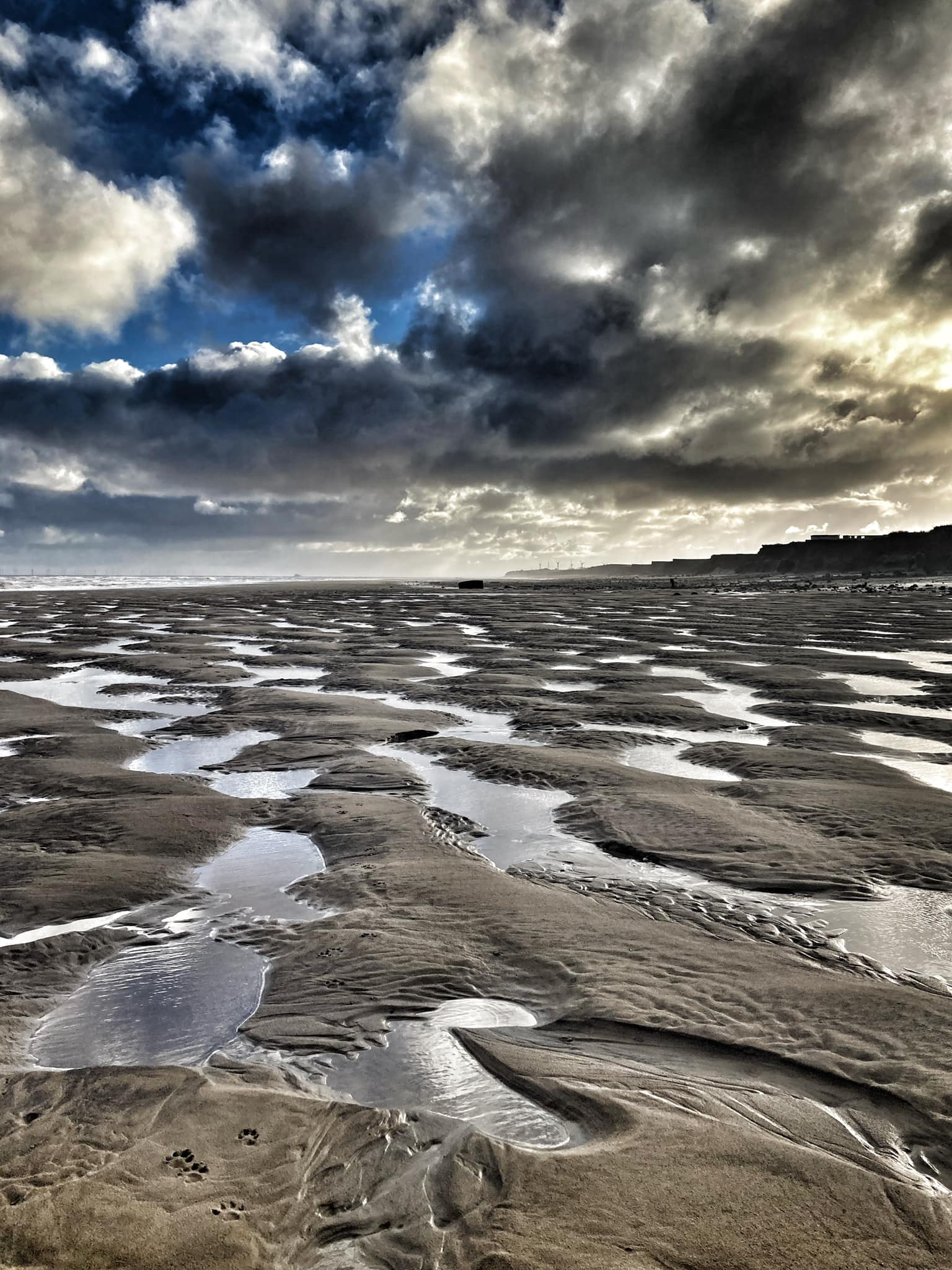
South of Withernsea at low tide.
