= Guido Bruck =

Guido Bruck (11 November 1920, Vienna – 13 March 1966, Melk) was an Austrian Numismatist

In 1948, he obtained his Doctorate in Philosophy. In the same year, he was appointed to the Kunsthistorisches Museum in Vienna where he worked as a curator until his early death.

He is noted for his groundbreaking work "Die spätrömische Kupferprägung", Late Roman Copper Coinage, which provides a key to coins of the late Roman period through its analysis of the iconography present on the Obverse and reverse, allowing an identification even in the case of worn mintmarks. This work has served as a basis for other studies and is frequently cited as a resource for the identification of worn late Roman coins. It was re-edited and translated into English in 2014, under the title "Late Roman Bronze Coinage – An attribution guide for poorly preserved coins".

== Publications ==
- Münzkundliche Untersuchungen zur Geschichte der Kaiser Marcus Claudius Tacitus und Marcus Annius Florianus, Dissertation, University of Vienna 1948
- Die Verwendung christlicher Symbole auf Münzen von Constantin I. bis Magnentius. Numismatische Zeitschrift 76 (1955) : 26- 32.
- Die spätrömische Kupferprägung : ein Bestimmungsbuch für schlecht erhaltene Münzen, Graz 1961
- Late Roman Bronze Coinage – An attribution guide for poorly preserved coins, 2014 (Translated by Alisdair Menzies)
