= Studien zu Fundmünzen der Antike =

Series of monographs published on Germany

Studien zu Fundmünzen der Antike is a monograph series covering the analysis of ancient coin finds in an archaeological context. Monographs or individual contributions to monographs are published in English, French, Italian, or German. The series was established in 1979. From 1979 to 2000 it was published by Gebr. Mann Verlag (Berlin). Since 2000, the series is published by Philipp von Zabern Verlag (Mainz). The series editors are Hans-Markus von Kaenel and Maria R.-Alföldi (Johann Wolfgang Goethe University Frankfurt am Main). The series is produced under the auspices of the Fundmünzen der Antike project (Akademie der Wissenschaften und der Literatur). The project is also responsible for another monograph series, Fundmünzen der römischen Zeit in Deutschland, which catalogs coin finds from excavations, surveys, coin hoards, and local collections in the area of modern Germany.
