= Hawsker-cum-Stainsacre =

Civil parish in North Yorkshire, England

Coordinates: 54.4506°N 0.5850°W

- Civil parish
- Hawsker-cum-Stainsacre parish highlighted in red and land common to Fylingdales and Hawsker-cum-Stainsacre parishes highlighted in pink.
- Population: 710 (2021 Census)
- OS grid reference: NZ918070
- Civil parish: Hawsker-cum-Stainsacre
- Unitary authority: North Yorkshire
- Ceremonial county: North Yorkshire
- Region: Yorkshire and the Humber
- Country: England
- Sovereign state: United Kingdom
- Post town: Whitby
- Postcode district: YO22
- Police: North Yorkshire
- Fire: North Yorkshire
- Ambulance: Yorkshire
- UK Parliament: Scarborough and Whitby

Hawsker-cum-Stainsacre is a civil parish in the county of North Yorkshire, England. The population of the parish was listed as being 710 at the 2021 Census.

== History ==
Historically the area was in the wapentake of Whitby Strand, and within the parish of Whitby. However, in 1878, it was made into a separate parish, and then later the parish of Helredale was created from lands in the north of the old parish boundary. In 1859, the parish totalled an area of 4,396 acres (1,779 ha), but at the 2011 census, this amounted to 10,080 acres (4,079 hectares).

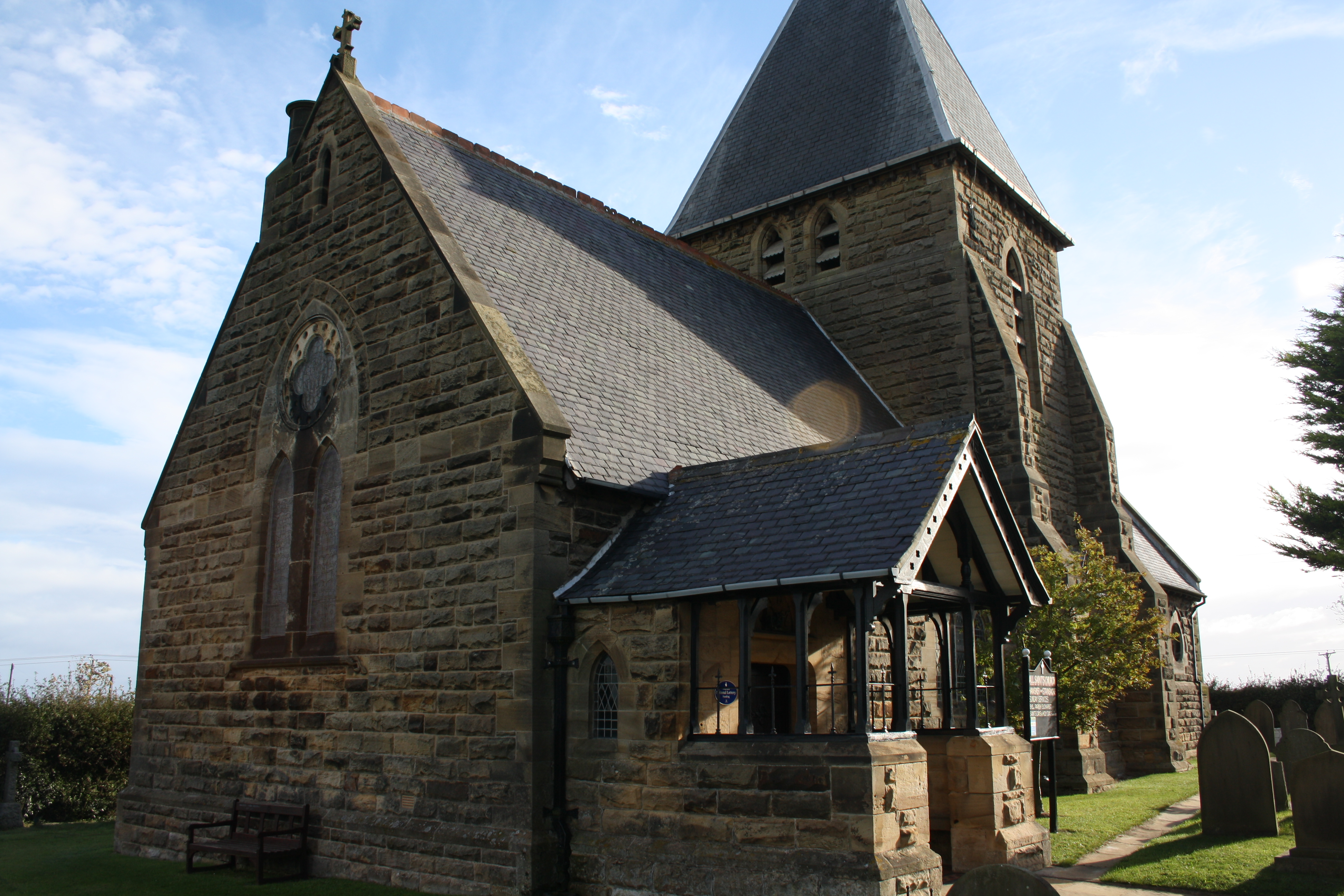
All Saints Church

According to the 2011 UK census, Hawsker-cum-Stainsacre parish had a population of 790, up from the 2001 UK census figure of 763. A population estimation by North Yorkshire County Council in 2015, listed the parish as having 850 inhabitants, and this had dropped to 710 by the 2021 Census.

From 1974 to 2023 it was part of the Borough of Scarborough, it is now administered by the unitary North Yorkshire Council.

There is a small church, built between 1876 and 1877 that is dedicated to All Saints, and is a Grade II listed building. previously, the Chapel of All Saints was in the parish, but this had fallen into disrepair by the 1820s, with only a 6.5-foot (2 m) cross to mark the site. Besides the church, there are eleven other listed buildings in the parish, all are grade II listed.

Electoral reform in 1832, and in 1885, saw many townships in the area, including Hawsker-cum-Stainsacre, being represented at Westminster by one Member of Parliament. The area is now represented as part of the Scarborough and Whitby Constituency.

In the west of the parish, Rigg Mill Beck and Stainsacre Beck both combine and run north-westwards into the River Esk above Ruswarp. Rigg Mill Beck used to have a water-powered corn mill working on it. The parish contains the two settlements of Hawsker (High and Low), and Stainsacre, and consists of moorland in the south-west, arable land around the settlements, and a long coastal strip fronting onto the North Sea.

Population of Hawsker-cum-Stainsacre 1801–2021
| 1801 | 1811 | 1821 | 1831 | 1841 | 1851 | 1861 | 1871 | 1881 | 1891 | 1901 | 1911 | 1921 | 1931 | 1951 | 1961 | 1971 | 2001 | 2011 | 2015 | 2021 |
|---|---|---|---|---|---|---|---|---|---|---|---|---|---|---|---|---|---|---|---|---|
| 549 | 519 | 634 | 654 | 724 | 786 | 914 | 972 | 962 | 1,062 | 886 | 507 | 614 | 659 | 473 | 494 | 669 | 763 | 790 | 850 (Note: Estimated population.) | 710 |

== See also ==
- Listed buildings in Hawsker-cum-Stainsacre
