= List of shipwrecks in October 1880 =

The list of shipwrecks in October 1880 includes ships sunk, foundered, grounded, or otherwise lost during October 1880.

== 1 October ==
List of shipwrecks: 1 October 1880
Ship	State	Description
Allemagne	France	The brig collided with the steamship Clymene (United Kingdom) and sank in the Bristol Channel with the loss of two of her six crew. Allemagne was on a voyage from Newport, Monmouthshire, United Kingdom to L'Orient, Morbihan.
Catherine	Netherlands	The schooner ran aground on Saltholm, Denmark. She was on a voyage from Nyland, Sweden to Delfzijl, Groningen. She was refloated and taken in to Copenhagen, Denmark.
Elwy	United Kingdom	The ship collided with the steamship Jules Chagot (France) off St. Agnes, Cornwall and was severely damaged. She was towed in to Penarth, Glamorgan by the steamship Oleaveaga (Flag unknown).
Enchantress	United Kingdom	The full-rigged ship was damaged by fire at Galveston, Texas, United States. She was on a voyage from Galveston to Bremen, Germany.
Glenmore	United Kingdom	The schooner was driven ashore and wrecked at Eckerö, Åland, Grand Duchy of Finland. She was on a voyage from Örnsköldsvik, Sweden to London.
Hylton Castle	United Kingdom	The steamship ran aground on a reef off Vancouver Island, British Columbia, Canada.
J. M. Scott	United Kingdom	The steam trawler was run ashore 3 nautical miles (5.6 km) south of Scarborough, Yorkshire.
Laurel	United Kingdom	The steamship collided with the steamship Portia (Germany) and sank off the coast of Essex. Her crew were rescued by Portia. Laurel was on a voyage from Seaham, County Durham to London.
Lima, and Oakdale	United States; United Kingdom	The barque Lima ran into the steamship Oakdale off Start Point, Devon. Both vessels were severely damaged. Lima was on a voyage from New Orleans, Louisiana to Rouen, Seine-Inférieure, France. She put in to Plymouth, Devon. Oakdale was on a voyage from Dartmouth, Devon to Demerara, British Honduras. Her passengers were taken off by a fishing boat or were evacuated via the lifeboats. She put in to Plymouth for repairs.
Matilde	Norway	The brig ran aground off the Russian Baltic coast Her crew were rescued.
Nessen	United Kingdom	The ship was driven ashore at Teignmouth, Devon. She was on a voyage from Sundsvall, Sweden to Teignmouth.
Pliny	United Kingdom	The steamship arrived at Madeira on fire. The fire was extinguished.
Zelica	United Kingdom	The ship departed from Pensacola, Florida, United States for Greenock, Renfrewshire. No further trace, reported missing.

== 2 October ==
List of shipwrecks: 2 October 1880
Ship	State	Description
Anna Otilie	Flag unknown	The ship was abandoned in the Baltic Sea 40 nautical miles (74 km) east of Gotland, Sweden. She was on a voyage from Saint Petersburg, Russia to Nyköping, Sweden.
Benella, Robinia and Stag	United Kingdom	The steamship Robinia was driven into the steamship Benella in a hurricane at São Miguel Island, Azores. Benella sank. She was on a voyage from Port Eads, Louisiana, United States to Bayonne, Loire-Inférieure, France<. Robinia then collided with the steamship Stag and sank. She was on a voyage from Port Eads to Havre de Grâce, Seine-Inférieure, France. Stag ran onto the wreck on Benella and sank. She was on a voyage from Port Eads to Marseille, Bouches-du-Rhône, France. The crews of all three vessels were rescued.
Berwick	United Kingdom	The steamship put in to Algiers, Algeria on fire. She was on a voyage from Sfax, Beylik of Tunis to Leith, Lothian. The fire was extinguished. She was consequently condemned.
Curlew	United Kingdom	The schooner was run down by the full-rigged ship Taunton and sank in the North Sea off Great Yarmouth, Norfolk with the loss of five of her eight crew. Survivors were rescued by Taunton. Curlew was on a voyage from Aberdeen to London.
Dronning Sophie	Norway	The steamship was driven ashore at New Romney, Kent, United Kingdom. She was refloated and resumed her voyage.
Fife Packet	United Kingdom	The ship founderef off Pladda. She was on a voyage from Larne, County Antrim to Ayr.
Florence	United Kingdom	The steamship was damaged by fire at Sunderland, County Durham.
J. F. Mann	Germany	The barque was driven ashore in the Tonalá River. She was on a voyage from Goole, Yorkshire, United Kingdom to the Tonalá River.
La Naiade	United Kingdom	The smack was lost off Lismore, County Waterford.
Mary Johnston	United Kingdom	The brig ran aground at Arbroath, Forfarshire. She was on a voyage from Sunderland, County Durham to Arbroath.
Mercutio	Sweden	The steamship ran aground near Pori, Grand Duchy of Finland. She was refloated and towed in to Stockholm by the steamship Hermes (Sweden).
St. Paul	United Kingdom	The fishing boat sank off Whitby, Yorkshire. Her three crew were rescued by the fishing boat 32 (United Kingdom).
Success	Norway	The galiot collided with the steamship Benin (United Kingdom) and was abandoned .
Thor	Norway	The ship departed from New York, United States for Amsterdam, North Holland, Netherlands. No further trace, reported missing.
Valiant	United Kingdom	The barge ran aground in the River Severn at Sharpness, Gloucestershire. She was on a voyage from Gloucester to Cardiff, Glamorgan.
Unnamed	Flag unknown	The schooner foundered in the Atlantic Ocean.

== 3 October ==
List of shipwrecks: 3 October 1880
Ship	State	Description
Batavia	Netherlands	The barque was wrecked on Hogland, Russia. Her crew were rescued. She was on a voyage from Vyborg, Grand Duchy of Finland to Amsterdam, North Holland.
Island Home	United Kingdom	The brig foundered in the Sea of Åland 1 nautical mile (1.9 km) west of Söderarm, Sweden with the loss of all hands.
Jessie McLeod	United Kingdom	The ship departed from the Larne Lough for Catania, Sicily, Italy. No further trace, reported hopelessly ovedue.
Nerissa	United Kingdom	The steamship collided with a derelict vessel in the Atlantic Ocean (50°57′N 20°30′W) and was damaged. She was on a voyage from Philadelphia, Pennsylvania, United States to Rotterdam, South Holland, Netherlands. She put in to Falmouth, Cornwall on 3 November.
Norfolk	United Kingdom	The ship ran aground in the Suez Canal. She was on a voyage from China to New York. She was refloated the next day and taken in to Port Said, Egypt, resuming her voyage on 6 October.
Senator Weber	United States	The ship was driven ashore at Liverpool, Lancashire, United Kingdom. She was on a voyage from Saint John, New Brunswick, Canada. She was refloated with assistance from the tug Great Emperor (United Kingdom).
Stern Chase	United Kingdom	The ship sprang a leak and was abandoned in the Atlantic Ocean (44°54′N 10°12′W). Her crew were rescued by the barque Maria Casabona (Italy). Stern Chase was on a voyage from "Mazerelli" to Bremen, Germany.
Unnamed	Flag unknown	The polacca was driven ashore and caught fire at Hangman Point, Devon, United Kingdom.

== 4 October ==
List of shipwrecks: 4 October 1880
Ship	State	Description
Blomman	(Russian Empire) Grand Duchy of Finland	The galeas ran aground at "Ryssaro".
Caroline	United Kingdom	The Thames barge was driven ashore and wrecked at Lowestoft, Suffolk. Her crew were rescued. She was on a voyage from London to Great Yarmouth, Norfolk.
Ebenezer	United Kingdom	The fishing lugger was driven ashore and wrecked at Great Yarmouth. Her twelve crew were rescued.
Elizabeth Hoggan	United Kingdom	The ship sprang a leak and foundered 5 nautical miles (9.3 km) north of Ailsa Craig. Her three crew survived. She was on a voyage from Troon, Ayrshire to Londonderry.
Eric the Red	United States	The full-rigged ship was wrecked off Cape Otway, Victoria. She was on a voyage from New York to Melbourne, Victoria.
Fly	United Kingdom	The schooner was driven ashore and wrecked 4 nautical miles (7.4 km) south of Scarborough, Yorkshire. Her crew survived. She was on a voyage from Seaham, County Durham to London.
Warkworth Castle	United Kingdom	The brig ran aground and was wrecked at Cimbritshamn, Sweden. She was on a voyage from Kronstadt, Russia to Gloucester. She was refloated and resumed her voyage.
Zuiderzee, or Zuyder Zee	Netherlands	The brig sprang a leak and was abandoned in the North Sea. All on board, at least nine people, were rescued by Margaret (United Kingdom) and she was set afire. Zuiderzee was on a voyage from Arkhangelsk, Russia to Harlingen, Friesland.

== 5 October ==
List of shipwrecks: 5 October 1880
Ship	State	Description
Alma	Norway	The barque foundered in the Atlantic Ocean off Cape Finisterre, Spain with the loss of ten of her eleven crew. The survivor was rescued from a raft on 9 October by the steamship Clymene (United Kingdom). Alma was on a voyage from Cardiff, Glamorgan, United Kingdom to Barcelona, Spain.
Ardent	United States	The schooner was wrecked in Green Bay, Lake Michigan. Her crew survived. She was on a voyage from Ellison Bay to Milwaukee, Wisconsin. She was declared a total loss.
Druid	United Kingdom	The ship departed from Irvine, Ayrshire for Lisbon, Portugal. No further trace, presumed foundered.
Elizabeth Catherine	United Kingdom	The ship was driven ashore at Bull Bay, Anglesey.
Emma Trechmann	United Kingdom	The steamship ran aground at Middlesbrough, Yorkshire.
Framnaes	Norway	The brig was driven ashore at Middleton, County Durham, United Kingdom. Her seven crew were rescued by the Hartlepool Lifeboat John Clay Barlow ( Royal National Lifeboat Institution). Fremnaes was on a voyage from Brevig to Hartlepool, County Durham.
Helena	United Kingdom	The trow was driven ashore and wrecked at Penarth, Glamorgan. Her crew were rescued.
Helen Douglas	United Kingdom	The brig ran aground on Mackinney's Bank, in the River Foyle. She was refloated the next day.
Iris	Norway	The ship was driven ashore at Lynetten, Denmark. She was on a voyage from Egersund to Copenhagen. She was later refloated and assisted in to Copenhagen.
Johanna	Russia	The ship was driven ashore and sank near Kuressaare.
May Hawthorne	United Kingdom	The Thames barge ran aground on the Longnose Rocks, Margate, Kent.
Nelly	United Kingdom	The barque ran aground at Seaham, County Durham. She was refloated and taken in to Seaham in a severely leaky condition.
Pandora	United Kingdom	The steam yacht ran aground at Argostoli, Cephalonia, Greece. She was on a voyage from Corfu to Cephalonia. She was later refloated with assistance from the frigate (Victor Emmanuel (Regia Marina).
Pet	United Kingdom	The schooner collided with the steamship Levant and sank off Kastrup, Denmark. Pet was on a voyage from Stettin, Germany to Wick, Caithness.
Reinholdt	Germany	The ship collided with Gottfried (Germany) at Copenhagen and was severely damaged.
Robert Stephenson	United Kingdom	The paddle steamer foundered in the North Sea 6 nautical miles (11 km) east south east of Sunderland, County Durham. Her five crew were rescued by the brig Cherokee (United Kingdom).
Seaflower	United Kingdom	The yacht was driven ashore and wrecked at Seaview, Isle of Wight.
Shahpore	United Kingdom	The ship departed from the River Mersey for Calcutta, India. No further trace, presumed foundered with the loss of all 33 crew.
Surprise	United Kingdom	The brigantine ran aground on the Pennington Spit, in the Solent. She was on a voyage from Cardiff, Glamorgan to Portsmouth, Hampshire. She was refloated and taken in to Yarmouth, Isle of Wight.
Svante	Sweden	The brig sprang a leak and sank in the Gulf of Bothnia. Her crew were rescued by Ralfsoln (Flag unknown). Svante was on a voyage from Skellefteå to Flensburg, Germany.
Thomas S. Stowe	United Kingdom	The ship ran aground on the South Bull. She was on a voyage from Dublin to Barrow-in-Furness, Lancashire. She was refloated and put back to Dublin.
Triton	Norway	The ship was driven ashore and sank at Copenhagen. She was on a voyage from Hudiksvall, Sweden to Calais, France.
Ybarra No. 2	Spain	The steamship suffered a boiler explosion at Bilbao which killed two of her crew and injured several others. She was on a voyage from Cardiff to Bilbao.
Ziroon	United Kingdom	The brig capsized in the River Thames at Charlton, Kent. She was on a voyage from Halifax Island to Charlton.

== 6 October ==
List of shipwrecks: 6 October 1880
Ship	State	Description
Alpha	United Kingdom	The schooner was driven ashore and damaged at Penzance, Cornwall.
Amelie	France	The brig was driven ashore on Nexø, Denmark. She was on a voyage from Örnsköldsvik, Sweden to Saint-Malo, Ille-et-Vilaine.
Ancient Promise	United Kingdom	The brig was abandoned in the Atlantic Ocean. Her crew were rescued by the schooner Florence (United Kingdom). Ancient Promise was on a voyage from Blyth, Northumberland to Agrigento, Sicily, Italy. She was subsequently towed in to Gibraltar.
Aurora	United Kingdom	The schooner was driven ashore and damaged at Penzance.
Boaz	United Kingdom	The schooner was driven ashore and damaged at Penzance.
Crower	United Kingdom	The schooner was driven ashore and damaged at Penzance.
Estepona	United Kingdom	The steamship departed from Cardiff, Glamorgan for Marseille, Bouches-du-Rhône, France. No further trace, reported missing, feared to have foundered in the Bay of Biscay with the loss of all hands.
Fairy	United Kingdom	The barque was driven ashore at New Ross, County Wexford. She was refloated and taken in to New Ross.
Feronia	United Kingdom	The ship ran aground and sank at "Simpnashkabh". She was on a voyage from Plymouth, Devon to Sundsvall, Sweden.
Jane	United Kingdom	The fishing lugger was swamped by heavy seas, off Penzance, Cornwall. She foundered with the loss of all seven crew.
John	United Kingdom	The schooner was driven ashore and damaged at Penzance.
Lafrowda	United Kingdom	The schooner was driven ashore and damaged at Penzance.
Livonia	United Kingdom	The ship ran aground at Sunderland, County Durham. She was on a voyage from Kotka, Grand Duchy of Finland to Sunderland. She was refloated.
Mercur	Germany	The steamship ran aground on the Kirkegrund. She was on a voyage from Stockholm, Sweden to Hamburg.
Pius IX	United Kingdom	The brig was driven ashore and damaged at Penzance.
Reidolf	Norway	The schooner ran aground on the Trompelond Bank, in the Gironde.
Resolute	Norway	The barque was wrecked at Quilimane, Portuguese East Africa.
Rio Grande	Norway	The ship sank at Bodø. She was on a voyage from Bergen to Tromsø.
Santos	Germany	The steamship ran aground at Cuxhaven.
Scottish Maid	United Kingdom	The schooner was driven ashore on the Potato Garth, in the River Wear.
Telltale	United Kingdom	The schooner was driven ashore and damaged at Penzance.
Triumph	United Kingdom	The schooner was driven ashore and damaged at Penzance.
Wesley	(United Kingdom of Great Britain and Ireland) Jersey	The ketch was driven against the quayside at Penzance and was severely damaged.
Wild Rose	United Kingdom	The ship was sighted whilst on a voyage from Moulmein, Burma to a British port. No further trace, reported missing.
19 unnamed vessels	United Kingdom	The fishing boats were destroyed, or damaged, in Mount's Bay.
Two unnamed vessels	United Kingdom	The fishing boats sank at Newlyn, Cornwall.
Eight unnamed vessels	United Kingdom	The fishing boats sank at Mousehole, Cornwall.

== 7 October ==
List of shipwrecks: 7 October 1880
Ship	State	Description
Åland	Sweden	The ship was driven ashore at Skillinge.
Betty Storrer	United States	The ship was abandoned at sea. Her crew were rescued by Casilda (United States). Betty Storrer was on a voyage from Antwerp, Belgium to New York.
Dagö	Sweden	The ship was driven ashore at Skillinge.
Glory of the Seas	United States	The ship ran aground at Dublin, United Kingdom. She was on a voyage from San Francisco, California to Dublin. She was refloated the next day.
Henry Benness	United Kingdom	The brig sprang a leak and sank off the Longships, Cornwall. Her crew were rescued by the steamship Progress (United Kingdom). Henry Benness was on a voyage from Runcorn, Cheshire to Newcastle upon Tyne, Northumberland.
Lintrathen	United Kingdom	The ship ran aground at Fleetwood, Lancashire and was beached. She was on a voyage from Fleetwood to Valparaíso, Chile. She was refloated and towed in to Birkenhead, Cheshire by the tug Toiler (United Kingdom).
Newnham	United Kingdom	The steamship ran aground on the Banjaard Sand, in the North Sea off the coast of Zeeland, Netherlands. She was on a voyage from Newcastle upon Tyne, Northumberland to Antwerp, Belgium. She was refloated and resumed her voyage.
Rapid	United Kingdom	The ship was driven ashore at Skillinge.
Soderlinge	Sweden	The ship was driven ashore at Skillinge.
Sofia	Flag unknown	The ship ran aground on Hufondskar. She was on a voyage from Copenhagen, Denmark to Sundsvall, Sweden.
Somorrostro	United Kingdom	The steamship was believed to have foundered in the Bay of Biscay with the loss of all on board. Her lights were observed to disappear by the steamship Rochefort (France). Somorrostro was on a voyage from Bilbao, Spain to Cardiff, Glamorgan.
T. D. Marshall	United Kingdom	The paddle tug ran aground in the River Usk and was severely damaged.
Wattson	United Kingdom	The ship was driven ashore at Skillinge.
Aberystwyth Lifeboat	Royal National Lifeboat Institution	The lifeboat capsized whilst going to the assistance of Julia (United Kingdom) in Cardigan Bay. Two of her crew were injured.

== 8 October ==
List of shipwrecks: 8 October 1880
Ship	State	Description
Aldebaran	Italy	The barque was abandoned in the Atlantic Ocean (50°00′N 9°40′W). Her crew were rescued by Umgeni (United Kingdom). Aldebaran was on a voyage from Genoa to Liverpool, Lancashire, United Kingdom.
Ann and Jane	United Kingdom	The schooner was abandoned in the Atlantic Ocean. Her crew were rescued by a barque. She was on a voyage from Swansea, Glamorgan to Lisbon, Portugal.
Ann Lucy	United Kingdom	The schooner ran aground on the Whiting Sand, in the North Sea off the coast of Essex. Her crew were rescued by Ripple (United Kingdom). Ann Lucy was on a voyage from Boulogne, Pas-de-Calais, France to Newcastle upon Tyne, Northumberland. She was refloated and assisted in to Harwich, Essex. She was beached there, being in a severely leaky condition.
Bassano	United Kingdom	The steamship was driven ashore at Boston, Massachusetts, United States. She was on a voyage from Boston to Hull, Yorkshire. Bassano was refloated and put back to Boston for repairs.
Cathay	United Kingdom	The steamship was severely damaged by fire at Greenock, Renfrewshire.
Clan Gordon	United Kingdom	The steamship was driven ashore at Jeddah, Hejaz Vilayet.
Duncairn	United Kingdom	The ship ran aground in the Thanlwin. She was refloated and taken in to Moulmein, Burma in a severely leaky condition.
Hannah	United Kingdom	The schooner was run down and sunk in the Irish Sea, 2.5 nautical miles (4.6 km) off Holyhead, by the passenger steamship Shamrock (United Kingdom) and with the loss of three of Hannah's four crew. Hannah was on a voyage from Runcorn, Cheshire to Yarmouth, Norfolk, with salt.
Louvain	Belgium	The steamship was driven ashore at Middelkerke, West Flanders. She was on a voyage from London, United Kingdom to Bruges, West Flanders. She was refloated with the assistance of tugs.
Maja	Denmark	The schooner ran aground off Amager. She was on a voyage from Hull, Yorkshire, United Kingdom to Trelleborg, Sweden. She was refloated and assisted in to Copenhagen.
Marie	Denmark	The brig was abandoned in the Atlantic Ocean (47°48′N 8°09′W). Her crew were rescued by the steamship Whitehall (United Kingdom). Marie was on a voyage from Hamburg to Buenos Aires, Argentina. She was later discovered by the steamship Neera (United Kingdom) and set afire.
Orvarodd	Norway	The ship was abandoned in the North Sea. Her crew were rescued. She was taken in to Hull in a derelict condition by British and Dutch smacks.
Peggy	United Kingdom	The schooner was beached at Longhope, Orkney Islands.
Rokeby	United Kingdom	The steamship was driven ashore at Port Said, Egypt. She was on a voyage from Cardiff, Glamorgan to Port Said.
Valencia	United Kingdom	The steamship was driven ashore at Europa Point, Gibraltar. She was on a voyage from Newcastle upon Tyne to Alexandria, Egypt. She was refloated on 10 October and resumed her voyage.
Yanikale	United Kingdom	The barque was abandoned in the Bristol Channel west of Lundy Island, Devon. Her crew were rescued by St. Devenick ( (United Kingdom of Great Britain and Ireland) Guernsey). Yanikale was on a voyage from Gävle, Sweden to Gloucester.
1, and 2	United Kingdom	The barges were abandoned in the Irish Sea 10 nautical miles (19 km) off the South Stack, Anglesey. They were towed in to Holyhead by the tug Brilliant Star (United Kingdom).
Two unnamed vessels	Russia	The lighters sprang a leak and sank at Kronstadt.

== 9 October ==
List of shipwrecks: 9 October 1880
Ship	State	Description
Burgermeister Schwing	Germany	The barque was abandoned in the Atlantic Ocean. Her ten crew were rescued by the barque Balder (Sweden). Burgermeister Schwing was on a voyage from Miramichi, New Brunswick, Canada to Deal, Kent, United Kingdom.
Charles Marie	France	The brigantine was abandoned 70 nautical miles (130 km) south of the Old Head of Kinsale, County Cork, United Kingdom. Her crew were rescued by Nimrod (United Kingdom). Charles Marie was on a voyage from Bilbao, Spain to Newport, Monmouthshire, United Kingdom.
City of Cork	United Kingdom	The steamship was driven against the pier at Cowes, Isle of Wight and was severely damaged.
Cyane do Vouga	Portugal	The brigantine sprang a leak and foundered in the Atlantic Ocean. Her crew were rescued by the brig Star (United Kingdom). Cyane do Vouga was on a voyage from the Rio Grande to Porto.
Edouard Konig	Flag unknown	The ship was driven ashore on Ven, Sweden. She was refloated and taken in to Copenhagen.
Fernando	Spain	The brig was abandoned in the Atlantic Ocean. Her crew were rescued by the barque San Francisco (United Kingdom). Fernando was on a voyage from Liverpool, Lancashire, United Kingdom to Puerto Rico.
Frolic	United Kingdom	The fishing boat sank at Whitby, Yorkshire. She was refloated.
Hope	United Kingdom	The schooner sank in the North Sea off Great Yarmouth, Norfolk. Her crew were rescued by the tug Reaper (United Kingdom) and/or the Corton Lifeboat. Hope was on a voyage from Sunderland, County Durham to Portsmouth, Hampshire.
Livadia	Imperial Russian Navy	The steam yacht was damaged in a storm in the Bay of Biscay. She put in to Ferrol, Spain for repairs.
Reaper	United Kingdom	The fishing boat was driven ashore at Whitby. She was refloated on 3 November.
Splendid	United Kingdom	The schooner foundered. Her five crew were rescued by Adirondack (United States). Splendid was on a voyage from Limerick to the Bristol Channel.
Strathnisle	United Kingdom	The schooner sprang a leak and was abandoned. She was on a voyage from Newport, Monmouthshire to Plymouth, Devon. She was towed in to the Isles of Scilly by a pilot boat.
Topsy	United Kingdom	The Humber keel sank in the Humber with the loss of both crew.
Velocity	United Kingdom	The schooner ran aground and was wrecked off Ballykisane, County Kerry.
Wells	United Kingdom	The schooner was driven ashore at Cowes, Isle of Wight. She was on a voyage from Newhaven, Sussex to Cowes. She was refloated with assistance from the tug Admiral (United Kingdom) and taken in to Cowes.

== 10 October ==
List of shipwrecks: 10 October 1880
Ship	State	Description
Constantia	Sweden	The barque was wrecked at the mouth of the Tonalá River.
Ganger	Norway	The barque was wrecked at the mouth of the Tonalá River.
Gerda	Sweden	The brig ran aground off the Barfleur Lightship (France). She was on a voyage from Sundsvall to Honfleur, Manche, France. She was refloated and towed in to a port.
Killeena	United Kingdom	The barque was abandoned in the Atlantic Ocean off the Irish coast. All nineteen people on board were rescued by the barque Freeman Dennis (United Kingdom). Killeena was on a voyage from New York, United States to Liverpool, Lancashire. She was subsequently discovered by the barque Beatrice ( Canada and taken in tow.
Lady Louise	United Kingdom	The smack foundered off Lundy Island, Devon. Both crew were rescued by Empress (United Kingdom).
Saga	Sweden	The barque ran aground on the Leman Sand, in the North Sea. All fourteen people on board took to a boat; they were rescued by the brig Eighteen Sisters (Denmark). Saga was on a voyage from Fredrikstadt to the Cape of Good Hope, Cape Colony. She subsequently floated off and ran aground on the Haisborough Sands. She was refloated and towed to Great Yarmouth, Norfolk, United Kingdom and was beached in a waterlogged condition.

== 11 October ==
List of shipwrecks: 11 October 1880
Ship	State	Description
Alswold	United Kingdom	The brig was wrecked on the East Burro Sands, in the North Sea off the coast of Essex. Her crew were rescued by the tug Alarm (United Kingdom).
Felicity	United Kingdom	The ship ran aground on the Finngrund, in the Baltic Sea. She was on a voyage from Söderhamn, Sweden to West Hartlepool, County Durham. She was refloated and taken in to Gävle, Sweden.
Maria	Norway	The brig sank in the Dogger Bank. Her crew were rescued. She was on a voyage from Portsmouth, Hampshire, United Kingdom to Arendal.
Sophie	Germany	The ship departed from Kronstadt, Russia for Ystad, Sweden. No further trace, reported missing.

== 12 October ==
List of shipwrecks: 12 October 1880
Ship	State	Description
Celeritas	Norway	The ship capsized at Shoreham-by-Sea, Sussex, United Kingdom.
Gebroeders Sikkens	Netherlands	The ship foundered in the North Sea. Her crew were rescued. She was on a voyage from Fraserburgh, Aberdeenshire, United Kingdom to Libava, Courland Governorate.
Lochnagar	United Kingdom	The ship ran ashore in Poverty Bay. She was on a voyage from Auckland, New Zealand to Poverty Bay.
Maria	United Kingdom	The brigantine sprang a leak and was abandoned in the Atlantic Ocean (43°05′N 12°55′W). Her crew were rescued by Pelikan (Flag unknown). Maria was on a voyage from the Rio Grande to Falmouth, Cornwall.
Minstrel	United Kingdom	The yacht capsized in the English Channel 1.5 nautical miles (2.8 km) off Hastings, Sussex with the loss of four of the five people on board. The survivor was rescued by a fishing smack.
Primrose	United Kingdom	The brig was abandoned in the Atlantic Ocean 350 nautical miles (650 km) off Bermuda. Her crew were rescued by the barque Jubenal (Norway). Primrose was on a voyage from Antwerp, Belgium to Trinidad.
Regulus	Austria-Hungary	The ship was wrecked in the Chaussé de Sein, off the Île de Sein, Finistère, France. She was on a voyage from Bordeaux, Gironde, France to Newport, Monmouthshire, United Kingdom.

== 13 October ==
List of shipwrecks: 13 October 1880
Ship	State	Description
Anna	Russia	The ship foundered in the North Sea. Her crew survived.
Baron Pahlen	Russia	The steamship sank at Dunkirk, Nord, France. She was on a voyage from Saint Petersburg to Dunkirk.
Emma	United Kingdom	The schooner departed from Barrow-in-Furness, Lancashire for Rotterdam, South Holland, Netherlands. No further trace, reported missing.
Laconia	United Kingdom	The steamship was driven ashore at Famagusta, Cyprus. She was refloated.
Langurthoe	United Kingdom	The schooner was driven ashore at Hampton-on-Sea, Kent. She was on a voyage from Dordrecht, South Holland, Netherlands to London.
Unnamed	Flag unknown	The schooner was driven ashore at Reculver, Kent.

== 14 October ==
List of shipwrecks: 14 October 1880
Ship	State	Description
Bristol City	United Kingdom	The steamship ran aground in the River Avon. She was on a voyage from Bristol, Gloucestershire to New York, United States. She was refloated and resumed her voyage.
Christian	Germany	The ship was driven ashore and capsized at Hiddensee with the loss of all but one of her crew.
County of Richmond	United Kingdom	The barque foundered in the Atlantic Ocean with the loss of all but two of her crew. Survivors clung to part of the wrecked vessel, which formed an impromptu raft. They were rescued a week later by the barque Leandro ( Principality of Montenegro). County of Richmond was on a voyage from New York, United States to Saint Thomas, Virgin Islands.
Giacomino	Italy	The barque foundered in the Atlantic Ocean. Her crew were rescued by the barque Nicola P. (Italy). Giacomino was on a voyage from Cardiff, Glamorgan, United Kingdom to Buenos Aires, Argentina.
Heinrich Sellschopp	Germany	The ship was wrecked on the Tabasco Coast near "Tuplico". Her crew were rescued.
Plantagenet	United Kingdom	The steamship struck a submerged object and foundered off Cape Palos, Spain. Her crew survived. She was on a voyage from Cardiff to Barcelona, Spain.

== 15 October ==
List of shipwrecks: 15 October 1880
Ship	State	Description
Actif	France	The lugger collided with the steamship Kestrel (United Kingdom) and sank off Rye, Sussex, United Kingdom with the loss of seven of her nine crew. Survivor were rescued by Kestrel
Alpena	United States	The paddle steamer sank in Lake Michigan with the loss of at least 80 lives. She was on a voyage from Grand Haven, Michigan to Chicago, Illinois.
Anne and Betsey	United Kingdom	The schooner sprang a leak and foundered in the Irish Sea. Both crew survived. She was on a voyage from Fishguard, Pembrokeshire to Swansea, Glamorgan.
Bertha Carrington	(United Kingdom of Great Britain and Ireland) Guernsey	The ship departed from Garston, Lancashire for Pernambuco, Brazil. No further trace, reported missing.
Cecelia	United Kingdom	The fishing trawler strucks rock off Prawle Point, Devon and foundered.
Elizabeth Catherine	Norway	The ship ran aground. She was on a voyage from Riga, Russia to Amsterdam, North Holland, Netherlands. She was refloated and towed in to the Nieuw Diep.
Hawarden Castle	United Kingdom	The ship caught fire at San Francisco, California, United States. The fire was extinguished.
Hylton Castle	United States	The steam barge foundered in Lake Michigan with the loss of all ten crew.
Ivy	United Kingdom	The yacht caught fire and sank in the Humber. Her crew were rescued.
James Walker	United Kingdom	The steamship was driven ashore at Camber, Sussex. She was on a voyage from Havre de Grâce, Seine-Inférieure to Hartlepool, County Durham. She was refloated and resumed her voyage.
Lota	United Kingdom	The barque departed from Hong Kong for Keelung, China. No further trace.
Trocadero	United Kingdom	The steamship collided with a Norwegian barque at Gravesend, Kent and was severely damaged.
Unnamed	Liberia	The schooner capsized off Grand Bassa with the loss of 34 of the 38 people on board. Survivors were rescued by Corsico (Flag unknown).

== 16 October ==
List of shipwrecks: 16 October 1880
Ship	State	Description
Antonio	Italy	The schooner was driven ashore and wrecked at Barletta. Her crew were rescued.
Eustace	United Kingdom	The steamship ran aground at Jeddah, Hejaz Vilayet. She was on a voyage from Busrah, Persia to Jeddah. She was refloated on 19 October and taken in to Jeddah.
Henrietta	Canada	The ship departed from New York, United States for Antwerp, Belgium. No further trace, reported missing.
Maria Antoinetta	Italy	The brigantine was driven ashore and wrecked at Barletta. Her crew were rescued.
Mula	Flag unknown	The steamship ran aground on the Abbo Fararnez Reef, in the Red Sea. She was on a voyage from Yembo to Jeddah, Hejaz Vilayet. She was refloated on 19 October and completed her voyage.
Rollo	United Kingdom	The steamship collided with HMS Lively (Royal Navy) near Hull, Yorkshire and was damaged. Rollo was on a voyage from Hull to Gothenburg, Sweden. She put back to Hull for repairs.
Smales	United Kingdom	The brig ran aground on the Scroby Sands, Norfolk. She was refloated and resumed her voyage, but was consequently towed in to Lowestoft, Suffolk in a leaky condition.
West Cumberland	United Kingdom	The steamship ran aground at Riga, Russia. She was refloated and taken in to Riga.
Unnamed	Liberia	The schooner capsized off the coast of Grand Bassa with the loss of 34 of the 38 people on board. Survivors were rescued the next day by Corisco (United Kingdom).

== 17 October ==
List of shipwrecks: 17 October 1880
Ship	State	Description
Blanche	United Kingdom	The schooner sank 35 nautical miles (65 km) off The Lizard, Cornwall. Her crew were rescued by Lizzie Trenberth (United Kingdom). Blanche was on a voyage from "Villa Suztch" to London.
Mathilde	France	The schooner was abandoned in the Atlantic Ocean. Her crew and 80 passengers were rescued by Inchmaree (United Kingdom). Mathilde was on a voyage from Saint-Pierre, Saint Pierre and Miquelon to Granville, Manche.
Trinity	United States	The barque was beached on Heard Island. Her 35 crew went ashore. She floated off, drifted out to sea and was not seen again. Thirty-three survivors were rescued on 15 February 1882 by USS Marion (United States Navy.

== 18 October ==
List of shipwrecks: 18 October 1880
Ship	State	Description
Asia	Germany	The steamship was wrecked on Socotra, Aden Settlement. Her crew were rescued by Prinds Hendrik (Germany). The wreck was plundered by the local inhabitants.
Bedford	United Kingdom	The steamship was damaged by fire at Charleston, South Carolina, United States.
Berryer	United Kingdom	The barque ran aground at Arkhangelsk, Russia and became waterlogged.
Borrodale	United Kingdom	The steamship caught fire at Charleston and was scuttled. She was severely damaged.
Forward	United Kingdom	The ship departed from London for Stockton-on-Tees, County Durham. No further trace, reported overdue, feared to have foundered.
George O'Neill	Sweden	The brig ran aground at St. Ubes, Portugal. She was refloated and put back to St. Ubes.
Giuseppe Capurro	Italy	The ship departed from New York, United States. for Bordeaux, Gironde, France. No further trace, reported missing.
Norma	Germany	The ship ran aground at New York She was on a voyage from Hamburg to New York. She was refloated and taken in to New York.
Paradox	United Kingdom	The steamship ran aground on Whitgift Ness.
Prim	Norway	The barque was towed in to Riga, Russia in a waterlogged condition.
Queen of the Isles	United Kingdom	The ship was driven ashore on Trondra, Shetland Islands.
Travancore	United Kingdom	The steamship was severely damaged by fire at Charleston.
Unnamed	United States	The tug was wrecked in Lake Michigan with the loss of all ten crew.

== 19 October ==
List of shipwrecks: 19 October 1880
Ship	State	Description
Casualita	Italy	The barque was run into by the schooner Edward Seymour (United Kingdom) at Gibraltar and was severely damaged.
Denia	United Kingdom	The steamship sank at Sunderland, County Durham. She was refloated on 21 October.
Gezina Jantina	Netherlands	The ship was driven ashore at Egmond aan Zee, North Holland. Her crew were rescued. She was on a voyage from Rotterdam, South Holland to Westervik, Sweden.
Holbeach	United Kingdom	The ship was driven ashore and wrecked near Saltfleethaven, Lincolnshire.
Mary Atkinson	United Kingdom	The ship departed from Newport, Monmouthshire for Newry, County Antrim. No further trace, reported missing.
William Henry	United Kingdom	The schooner struck a sunken wreck in the Clyde. She was on a voyage from Caernarfon to a Clyde port. She was taken in to Bowling, Dunbartonshire, where she sank.

== 20 October ==
List of shipwrecks: 20 October 1880
Ship	State	Description
Alida	Netherlands	The ship collided with the steamship Christian IX (Denmark) and sank in the Kattegat. Her crew were rescued. Alida was on a voyage from Libava, Courland Governorate to Schiedam, South Holland.
Alpha	Germany	The steamship was driven ashore and sank at "Möroone", Denmark. She was on a voyage from Newcastle upon Tyne, Northumberland, United Kingdom to Lübeck. She was later refloated and towed in to Kiel in a leaky condition by the steamship Bertha (Flag unknown). She was placed under repair.
Alto	Russia	The ship was driven ashore at Prøvestenen, Denmark. She was on a voyage from Saint Petersburg to Copenhagen.
Artushof	Germany	The steamship ran aground at Falsterbo, Sweden. She was on a voyage from Kronstadt, Russia to Liverpool, Lancashire, United Kingdom. She was refloated and taken in to Copenhagen in a leaky condition.
Cotherall	Denmark	The ship was driven ashore at Dragør. She was on a voyage from Königsberg, Germany to Stavanger, Norway.
Elizabeth	Netherlands	The ship was driven ashore at Copenhagen. She was on a voyage from Riga, Russia to Harlingen, Friesland.
Elizabeth	Netherlands	The schooner was driven ashore at Copenhagen.
Eunomia	Denmark	The barque ran aground. She was on a voyage from Sundsvall, Sweden to Copenhagen. She was refloated and towed in to Copenhagen in a leaky condition.
Faraday	United Kingdom	The steamship collided with the steamship Garry (United Kingdom) and sank at Copenhagen. Her crew were rescued. Faraday was on a voyage from Newcastle upon Tyne, Northumberland to Copenhagen. She was refloated on 26 October and taken in to Copenhagen.
Kiwas	Russia	The brig was driven ashore at Narva.
Lizzie Ann	United Kingdom	The smack was driven ashore and sank at Goodwick, Pembrokeshire.
Margaretha Gezina	Netherlands	The ship was wrecked on the Borcum Reef, in the Baltic Sea. Her crew were rescued by Dunbeath Castle (United Kingdom).
Neptun	Germany	The steamship was driven ashore at Kastrup, Denmark. She was on a voyage from Riga to Rotterdam, South Holland.
Pandora	Denmark	The ketch was driven ashore at Copenhagen. She was on a voyage from Sweden to Hull.
Riwas	Russia	The barque was driven ashore at Narva.
Rudolph	United Kingdom	The ship was sighted off Rügen, Germany whilst on a voyage from Sunderland, County Durham to Stettin, Germanhy. No further trace, reported missing.
Sophie	Norway	The ship was driven ashore at Dragør. She was on a voyage from Porvoo, Grand Duchy of Finland to Copenhagen.
Triton	Norway	The barque was driven ashore and sank at Copenhagen.
Victoria Nancy	France	The ship was wrecked on the Tiperand Rocks. She was on a voyage from an English port to Vannes, Morbihan.
Weselina	Germany	The schooner ran aground on the Domesnes Reef, in the Baltic Sea, and sank. She was on a voyage from Hamburg to Riga.

== 21 October ==
List of shipwrecks: 21 October 1880
Ship	State	Description
Bessie Wilkingson	United Kingdom	The ketch ran aground on the Blackrock, off Mevagissey, Cornwall. She was on a voyage from Newport, Monmouthshire to Mevagissey.
Groes	Sweden	The ship was driven ashore on Stege, Denmark.
Hugo	Sweden	The schooner was driven ashore as Sandhamn.
J. B. Brown	United States	The schooner was driven ashore in Broad Bay. She was on a voyage from Christiania, Norway to Greenock, Renfrewshire, United Kingdom. She was refloated on 2 November and taken in to Stornoway, Isle of Lewis, Outer Hebrides.
Loch Tyne	United Kingdom	The fishing smack was driven ashore at Spurn Point, Yorkshire. She was refloated with assistance from the Spurn Lifeboat.
Marquis	United Kingdom	The brig was driven ashore and wrecked at Falmouth, Cornwall with the loss of three of her crew.
Pacific	United Kingdom	The steamship ran aground in the Haff. She was on a voyage from Stettin, Germany to Hull, Yorkshire.
Percy	United Kingdom	The schooner foundered off The Smalls, Pembrokeshire. Her crew took to a boat; they were rescued by the schooner Spray ( (United Kingdom of Great Britain and Ireland) Jersey). Percy was on a voyage from Par, Cornwall to Liverpool, Lancashire and Glasgow, Renfrewshire.
Perle	Germany	The schooner struck a rock at Banana Island Lagos Colony and sprang a leak. She was on a voyage from Hamburg to Sherbro Island, Sierra Leone.
Sunbeam	United Kingdom	The steamship ran aground at Malta. She was on a voyage from London to Odesa, Russia. She was refloated and resumed her voyage.
Unnamed	Germany	The schooner foundered in the Baltic Sea off the coast of the Courland Governorate with the loss of all hands.
Unnamed	Flag Unknown	The ship foundered in the Baltic Sea off the coast of the Courland Governorate with the loss of all hands.

== 22 October ==
List of shipwrecks: 22 October 1880
Ship	State	Description
Affigo	United Kingdom	The ship ran aground on the Pakefield Gat, in the North Sea off the coast of Suffolk. She was on a voyage from London to Goole. She was refloated and taken in to Great Yarmouth, Norfolk in a severely leaky condition.
Anna and Gustaf	Germany	The ship foundered in the Baltic Sea 8 nautical miles (15 km) off Rixhöft with the loss of all but her captain. He was rescued by Bella (United Kingdom). Anna and Gustaf was on a voyage from Riga, Russia to Middlesbrough, Yorkshire, United Kingdom.
Bessie	United Kingdom	The ship was driven ashore at Barry, Glamorgan.
Carl	Sweden	The schooner was driven ashore at Grönhöhen, Öland.
Catharina	Norway	The brig was driven ashore and wrecked at Östergarn, Gotland, Sweden. She was on a voyage from Kronstadt, Russia to Dieppe, Seine-Inférieure, France.
Charles Quint	France	The steamship was driven ashore at Djidjelli, Algeria. Her passengers were taken off. She was refloated on 5 November and sailed for Marseille, Bouches-du-Rhône.
Clydesdale	United Kingdom	The ship was wrecked at Parrsborough, Nova Scotia, Canada.
Friends	United Kingdom	The ship was sighted off Harwich, Essex whilst on a voyage from London to Goole, Yorkshire. No further trace, reported missing.
George	United Kingdom	The brig ran aground on the Hook Sands, off Poole, Dorset. She was on a voyage from Trouville-sur-Mer, Calvados, France to South Shields, County Durham.
Gertrude	Germany	The brig collided with three ships and ran aground at Stettin. She was on a voyage from Montrose, Forfarshire, United Kingdom to Stettin.
Margaret West	United Kingdom	The schooner ran aground on the Black Rock Ledge, off the Isle of Wight. She was on a voyage from Runcorn, Cheshire to Zierikzee, Zeeland, Netherlands. She was refloated and taken in to Cowes.
Mary	United Kingdom	The ship was sighted whilst on a voyage from Newport, Monmouthshire to Newry, County Antrim. No further trace, reported overdue.
Marys	United Kingdom	The brig dragged her anchor and hit the Black Rock at the entrance to Falmouth Harbour, Cornwall. She drifted leeward and sank between the rock and shore with the loss of three of her six crew.
May Olsen	Norway	The barque was towed into Swinemünde, Germany in a waterlogged condition. She was on a voyage from Kotka, Grand Duchy of Finland to Leith, Lothian, United Kingdom.
Olympe	Germany	The brig ran aground on the Herd Sand, in the North Sea off the coast of County Durham. She was on a voyage from Boulogne, Pas-de-Calais, France to South Shields. She was refloated the next day with the assistance of two tugs and taken in to South Shields in a severely leaky condition.
Rose	United Kingdom	The smack ran aground at St Margaret's Hope, Orkney Islands. She was on a voyage from East Wemyss, Fife to Kirkwall, Orkney Islands.
St. Clair	United Kingdom	The steamship struck the Roan Bogha Rock and sank off Tiree, Inner Hebrides. All on board survived. She was on a voyage from Arinagour, Coll to Scarnish, Tiree.
Wilhelmina	Norway	The brig was driven ashore at Falsterbo, Sweden. Her crew were rescued. She was on a voyage from Ljusne, Sweden to Dundee, Forfarshire, United Kingdom.
Unnamed	United Kingdom	The schooner ran aground on the Pennington Spit, off the Isle of Wight.

== 23 October ==
List of shipwrecks: 23 October 1880
Ship	State	Description
Argo	United Kingdom	The schooner sprang a leak and made for Old Grimsby, Tresco, Isles of Scilly. She stuck on rocks at Teän. Her crew were rescued the next day. She was on a voyage from Newport, Monmouthshire to Polruan, Cornwall.
Cattarina	Norway	The ship was driven ashore and wrecked at Östergarn, Gotland, Sweden. She was on a voyage from Kronstadt, Russia to Dieppe, Seine-Inférieure, France.
Enmore	United Kingdom	The steamship sprang a leak and foundered in the Atlantic Ocean 500 nautical miles (930 km) west of Ireland. Her crew were rescued by the barque Prinz Wilhelm (Germany). Enmore was on a voyage from Sydney, Nova Scotia, Canada to Hamburg, Germany.
Flossie	(United Kingdom of Great Britain and Ireland) Guernsey	The brig sprang a leak and was abandoned off the Isles of Scilly. Her crew were rescued by the steamship Castilian (United Kingdom). Flossie was on a voyage from Brest, Finistère, France to Swansea, Glamorgan.
George	United Kingdom	The ship ran aground on the Hook Sands, in the English Channel off Poole, Dorset. Her crew were rescued. She was on a voyage from Trouville-sur-Mer, Manche, France to South Shields, County Durham.
Lord Northbrook	United Kingdom	The barque put in to São Miguel Island, Azores on fire and was scuttled. She was on a voyage from Calcutta, India to London. She was a total loss.
Macedonia	United Kingdom	The barque capsized in the Atlantic Ocean with the loss of all but two of her eleven crew. Survivors were rescued by Hallgerda ( Canada). Macedonia was on a voyage from Pensacola, Florida, United States to Berwick upon Tweed, Northumberland.
Montague	United Kingdom	The ship ran aground on the Greysand, in Bideford Bay. She was on a voyage from Oak Bay, New Brunswick, Canada to Barnstaple, Devon.
Narcisse	France	The brigantine foundered off the Isles of Scilly. Her crew were rescued.
Nathalie	France	The steamship was driven ashore and wrecked at Torreira, Portugal with the loss of two lives. She was on a voyage from Havre de Grâce, Seine-Inférieure to Lisbon, Portugal.
Titania	United Kingdom	The steamship was holed off the coast of Nova Scotia, Canada by her spare propeller, which had broken loose. She became waterlogged.
Unnamed	France	The brig was abandoned in the Bay of Biscay. Her seven crew were rescbued by the brig John Twizell (United Kingdom).

== 24 October ==
List of shipwrecks: 24 October 1880
Ship	State	Description
Anna Gertrude	Netherlands	The ship was driven ashore at Falsterbo, Sweden. She was on a voyage from Riga, Russia to Delfzijl, Groningen.
Blanche	United Kingdom	The ketch sprang a leak and foundered 40 miles (64 km) west south-west of The Lizard, cornwall. Her captain was landed at Fowey, Cornwall by Lizzie Trembath (United Kingdom).
Charles Deering	United States	The barque was abandoned at sea. All on board were rescued by the barque August (Norway). Charles Deering was on a voyage from Akyab, Burma to the English Channel.
Eureka	United Kingdom	The abandoned schooner was discovered 25 nautical miles (46 km) south west by south of the Isles of Scilly by V. Troop, which put four crew aboard. They took her in to Plymouth, Devon.
Ferdinand and Annette	Flag unknown	The barque was driven ashore at "Erenoro", Denmark. Her crew were rescued. She was on a voyage from Kotka, Grand Duchy of Finland to Dunkirk, Nord, France.
Fervent	France	The steamship ran aground at Honfleur, Manche and was then run into by the brig Felix (Norway). Fervent was on a voyage from Kronstadt, Russia to Honfleur. She was refloated.
Graf Wedel	Sweden	The ship was driven ashore and wrecked at East London, Cape Colony with the loss of four of her crew.
Natalie	France	The steamship was wrecked "on the coast of Jorreira" with the loss of all but one of her crew.
Paula	France	The schooner foundered in the English Channel. Her crew were rescued. She was on a voyage from Cardiff, Glamorgan, United Kingdom to Boulogne, Pas-de-Calais.
Ruby	United Kingdom	The schooner was sighted off Seaford, Sussex whilst on a voyage from Runcorn, Cheshire to Newcastle upon Tyne, Northumberland. No further trace, presumed foundered with the loss of all hands.
Salopian	United Kingdom	The barque was abandoned in the Atlantic Ocean. She was on a voyage from Lisbon, Portugal to Liverpool, Lancashire. Her crew were rescued by the barque Slavia ( Principality of Montenegro). Salopian was discovered later that day by the steamship Pembroke, which put four of her crew on board and took her in tow. The tow was lost the next day and Pembroke retrieved her crew. Salopian was presumed to have subsequently foundered.
Salve Regina	Spain	The ship departed from Bilbao for Ardrossan, Ayrshire, United Kingdom. No further trace, reported hopelessly overdue.
Stentor	United Kingdom	The ship was holed by the propeller of another vessel at South Shields, County Durham. She sprang a severe leak and ran aground.
Unnamed	Flag unknown	The burning ship foundered in the Atlantic Ocean, observed by City of Perth (United Kingdom).

== 25 October ==
List of shipwrecks: 25 October 1880
Ship	State	Description
Carl	Germany	The steamship struck a rock and foundered off "Setta Kroo", Liberia. Her nineteen crew were rescued.
Daphne	Denmark	The ship departed from Burntisland, Fife, United Kingdom for Skien. No further trace, reported missing.
Edgar Cecil	United Kingdom	The ship was abandoned in the Atlantic Ocean. Her crew were rescued by Carmela (United States). Edgar Cecil was on a voyage from Java, Netherlands East Indies to Quebec City, Canada.
Edith May	United Kingdom	The schooner ran aground on the Dogger Bank, off the coast of County Wexford. She was on a voyage from Dublin to Wexford. She was refloated the next day and taken in to Wexford.
Foam	United Kingdom	The schooner sprang a leak in the Sound of Islay and was beached. She was on a voyage from Carrickfergus, County Antrim to Fisherrow, East Lothian.
Four Sisters	United Kingdom	The brig sprang a severe leak and was beached at Harwich, Essex. She was on a voyage from Sunderland, County Durham to Littlehampton, Sussex.
Isaac Webb	United States	The ship was abandoned in the Atlantic Ocean (42°30′N 59°20′W). Her 24 crew were rescued by the steamship Illyrian (United Kingdom). Isaac Webb was on a voyage from Antwerp, Belgium to New York.
J. H. Nieman	Germany	The steamship ran ashore on Saltholm, Denmark. She was refloated and resumed her voyage.
Lady of the Lake	United Kingdom	The ship departed from London for Newburgh, Fife. No further trace, reported severely overdue, presumed foundered with the loss of all six crew.
Liberal	Norway	The schooner was driven ashore at Hanko, Grand Duchy of Finland and became severely leaky.
Lotus	United Kingdom	The ship departed from Waterford for Runcorn, Cheshire. No further trace, reported missing.
Neilly	United Kingdom	The barque ran aground on the Old Harry Ledge, off the coast of Dorset. She was on a voyage from Swansea, Glamorgan to Poole, Dorset. She was refloated.
Rex	Sweden	The steamship was driven ashore at "Husvalla", Öland. She was refloated with assistance from the steamship Poseidon (Sweden) and taken in to Stockholm.
Three Brothers	United Kingdom	The ship was sighted off Harwich, Essex whilst on a voyage from Honfleur, Manche, France to Sunderland, County Durham. No further trace, reported missing.
Touraine	France	The steamship ran aground on the Nash Sands, in the Bristol Channel off the coast of Glamorgan, United Kingdom. She floated off and sank 4 nautical miles (7.4 km) south south west of Nash Point with the loss of two of her fourteen crew. Three survivors were rescued by the ketch Hope (United Kingdom). Nine survivors took to a boat; they were reported missing. Touraine was on a voyage from Bilbao, Spain to Cardiff, Glamorgan.
Unnamed	Flag unknown	The steamship foundered off "Stetia Kroo". Her crew were presumed to have survived.

== 26 October ==
List of shipwrecks: 26 October 1880
Ship	State	Description
Clan Fraser	United Kingdom	The steamship was driven ashore at Cape Finisterre, Spain. She was refloated and resumed her voyage.
Daniel Draper	Italy	The barque was wrecked at Castellammare del Golfo, Sicily.
Elizabeth Hill	United Kingdom	The ship was sighted whilst on a voyage from London to Hull, Yorkshire. No further trace, reported missing.
Frank	United Kingdom	The barque put in to Helsingør, Denmark on fire. She was on a voyage from Sundsvall, Sweden to Inverness. The fire was extinguished.
Hetty Mary	United Kingdom	The ship departed from Quittah, Africa for Queenstown, County Cork or Falmouth, Cornwall. No further trace, reported missing.
Pride of the Taw	United Kingdom	The ship ran aground in Bideford Bay. She was on a voyage from London to Cardiff, Glamorgan.
Umberto Galatola, and Winton	Italy; United Kingdom	The steamship Winton collided with the barque Umberto Galatola at South Shields, County Durham. Both vessels were severely damaged.
Hickman	United Kingdom	The ship ran ashore on Skomer Island, Pembrokeshire. She was on a voyage from Milford Haven to Dublin. She was refloated and put back to Milford Haven. Being in a leaky condition, she was beached there.
Maria Teresa	United Kingdom	The schooner was driven ashore at Vigo, Spain. She was on a voyage from Demerara, British Guiana to Lisbon, Portugal.

== 27 October ==
List of shipwrecks: 27 October 1880
Ship	State	Description
Alberta	United Kingdom	The brigantine ran aground on the Dog's Head Sand, in the Boston Deeps. She was on a voyage from London to Middlesbrough, Yorkshire. She was refloated and taken in to Boston, Lincolnshire for repairs.
Billy the Prizeman	United Kingdom	The schooner was driven ashore at Scarborough, Yorkshire. All on board were rescued by the Scarborough Lifeboat. She was on a voyage from Plymouth, Devon to Sunderland, County Durham.
Corsair	United Kingdom	The steamship was driven ashore opposite Greenock, Renfrewshire.
Emily Eliza	United Kingdom	The ship was driven ashore near Ryhope, County Durham.
Endeavour	United Kingdom	The sloop foundered in the Lynn Roads. Her three crew reached the Bar Lightship ( Trinity House), from where they were rescued. Endeavour was on a voyage from King's Lynn, Norfolk to the Humber.
Etuna	Denmark	The schooner was driven ashore and wrecked at "Wiron", Grand Duchy of Finland. She was on a voyage from Saint Petersburg, Russia to an English port.
Flying Huntsman	United Kingdom	The tug capsized and sank at South Shields, County Durham with the loss of all six crew.
Furst	United Kingdom	The tug sank at North Shields.
George	(United Kingdom of Great Britain and Ireland) Isle of Man	The schooner was driven ashore and wrecked at Ramsey. Her crew were rescued by rocket apparatus. She was on a voyage from Whitehaven, Cumberland to Ramsey.
Houghton	United Kingdom	The tug capsized and sank at South Shields with the loss of all six crew.
I Tell Ye	United States	The boat was run down and sunk in Boston Bay.
Jeanette	United Kingdom	The fishing trawler was driven ashore and sank near Kingstown, County Dublin.
Johanna	Denmark	The schooner foundered off South Shields with the loss of all but one of her crew. The survivor was rescued by the South Shields Lifeboat Northumberland ( Royal National Lifeboat Institution). Johanna was on a voyage from Rochester, Kent, United Kingdom to South Shields.
Madeleine Esther	United Kingdom	The ship was driven ashore in Carmarthen Bay 8 nautical miles (15 km) from Ferryside, Carmarthenshire with the loss of her captain. Four survivors were rescued by the lifeboat City of Manchester ( Royal National Lifeboat Institution). Madeleine Esther was on a voyage from New Ross, County Wexford to Cardiff, Glamorgan.
Mars	United Kingdom	The lighter was run into by the steamship Rotterdam (United Kingdom) and capsized at Grangemouth, Stirlingshire.
Mercury	United Kingdom	The steam lighter sank at Greenock. Her crew were rescued. She was refloated on 1 November and placed under repair.
Ocean	United Kingdom	The ship departed from London for Seaham. Presumed subsequently foundered with the loss of all hands.
Ocean Queen	United Kingdom	The fishing smack was wrecked on the Haisborough Sands, in the North Sea off the coast of Norfolk. Her crew were rescued by a Dutch fishing boat.
Osprey	Canada	The ship was abandoned in the Atlantic Ocean. Her crew were rescued by Chiara Penco (Flag unknown).
Penrith	United Kingdom	The ship ran aground on the Courland Bank, off Queenstown, County Cork. She was refloated.
Phonix	Norway	The schooner was abandoned in the North Sea (58°15′N 1°50′E). Her crew were rescued by the schooner Westerlinden (Norway). Phonix was on a voyage from Newcastle upon Tyne, Northumberland, United Kingdom to Kristiansand.

== 28 October ==
List of shipwrecks: 28 October 1880
Ship	State	Description
Affinite	United Kingdom	The ship was abandoned in the North Sea. Her crew were rescued. She was on a voyage from Vyborg, Grand Duchy of Finland to Stockton-on-Tees, County Durham.
Agnes	United Kingdom	The schooner ran aground in the Prince's Channel. She was refloated and taken in to Gravesend, Kent in a leaky condition.
Aguia	United Kingdom	The brig was driven ashore and wrecked in the Humber 1 nautical mile (1.9 km) from Stallingborough, Lincolnshire.
Alarm, or Alarum	United Kingdom	The ship was driven ashore at Hawsker, Yorkshire with the loss of all hands.
Albion	United Kingdom	The schooner was driven ashore at Holkham, Norfolk. Her crew were rescued.
Aldbro	United Kingdom	The schooner was driven ashore south of Grimsby, Lincolnshire. She was refloated on 1 November.
Alice	United Kingdom	The schooner was driven ashore and wrecked at Flamborough Head, Yorkshire.
Alice	Sweden	The brig was driven ashore and wrecked at Bamburgh, Northumberland, United Kingdom. Her nine crew were rescued by the North Sunderland Lifeboat. She was on a voyage from Sundsvall to the River Tyne.
Alice	United Kingdom	The ship was driven ashore in the River Ouse opposite Blacktoft, Lincolnshire. She was on a voyage from London to Goole, Yorkshire.
Amity	United Kingdom	The ship foundered in the North Sea.
Almuth Catherine	United Kingdom	The schooner was driven ashore and wrecked at Tetney Haven, Lincolnshire. She was on a voyage from London to Sunderland, County Durham.
Amelia	United Kingdom	The schooner was driven ashore and wrecked at South Shields, County Durham. Her five crew were rescued by rocket apparatus.
Amy	United Kingdom	The brig sank in Tara Bay, County Down. Her crew survived. She was refloated the next day.
Ann, and Daisy	United Kingdom	The schooner Ann was driven into the sloop Daisy off the coast of Northumberland. Ann was severely damaged.
Anna	United Kingdom	The ship was abandoned in the Atlantic Ocean. Her crew by the steamship Cairnsmuir (United Kingdom). Anna was on a voyage from Halifax, Nova Scotia, Canada to Rouen, Seine-Inférieure, France.
Annie Elizabeth	United Kingdom	The schooner was wrecked at Dalkey, County Durham with the loss of all hands.
Antipodes	United Kingdom	The ship was abandoned in the North Sea. Her crew were rescued.
Ariel	United Kingdom	The schooner was driven ashore south of Grimsby. She had been refloated by 6 November and taken in to Grimsby.
Arno	United Kingdom	The ship was driven ashore near Grimsby. She was refloated on 1 November.
Astley	United Kingdom	The brig was driven ashore and wrecked at Cullercoats, Northumberland. Her six crew were rescued. She was on a voyage from Glückstadt, Germany to West Hartlepool, County Durham.
Ax Öland	(Russian Empire) Grand Duchy of Finland	The schooner was driven ashore 6 nautical miles (11 km) north of Scarborough, Yorkshire. Her crew were rescued by rocket apparatus. She was on a voyage from Helsinki to Grimsby.
Bee	United Kingdom	The ship was driven ashore at Withernsea, Yorkshire.
Bellenden	United Kingdom	The brig was driven ashore and wrecked at Granton, Lothian.
Bellewood	United Kingdom	The ship ran aground at Belfast, County Antrim. She was on a voyage from Ayr to Belfast.
Benjamin Franklin	United Kingdom	The schooner was severely damaged at Dublin.
Berengaria	United Kingdom	The ship was driven ashore south of Grimsby. She was refloated on 1 November.
Bessy Jane	United Kingdom	The schooner was driven ashore at Abersoch, Caernarfonshire. She was on a voyage from Charleston, South Carolina, United States to Runcorn, Cheshire.
Betsy	United Kingdom	The ship was driven ashore south of Grimsby.
Black-eyed Susan	United Kingdom	The ship was driven ashore at Scarborough. Her seven crew were rescued by the Scarborough Lifeboat Lady Leigh ( Royal National Lifeboat Institution). Black-eyed Susan was on a voyage from Runcorn to Newcastle upon Tyne, Northumberland.
Blue Jacket	United Kingdom	The schooner was driven ashore south of Grimsby. She was refloated on 1 November.
Bosphorus	United Kingdom	The schooner was driven ashore at Scarborough. Her crew were rescued. She was on a voyage from Portsmouth, Hampshire to the River Tyne.
Brasberg	Norway	The barque was abandoned in the North Sea. Her crew survived.
Bride	United Kingdom	The steamship was driven ashore south of Grimsby.
British Engsign	United Kingdom	The brigantine was driven ashore at Seaham, County Durham with the loss of one of her seven crew. Survivors were rescued by rocket apparatus. She subsequently became a wreck.
Braemar Castle	United Kingdom	The steamship was run down and sunk by the steamship Breconshire (United Kingdom) at Penang, Straits Settlements. All on board were rescued. Braemar Castle was on a voyage from London to Hiogo, Japan.
Camillus	United Kingdom	The barque was driven ashore and wrecked at Newton-by-the-Sea, Northumberland. Her seven crew were rescued by rocket apparatus.
Canada	Norway	The barque was abandoned in the North Sea. Her crew were rescued by the steam cutter Africa, and by Countess of Devon (both United Kingdom). She was discovered by the steamship Secunda (Germany) and towed in to Bremen, Germany, where she arrived on 5 November.
Cassandra	United Kingdom	The schooner was driven ashore 1 nautical mile (1.9 km) north of Warkworth, Northumberland. Her crew were rescued by rocket apparatus. She was on a voyage from London to South Shields.
Cassandra	United Kingdom	The ship was lost on the east coast of England. Her crew were rescued.
Charles Dickens	Norway	The barque was driven ashore at Merlimont, Pas-de-Calais, France. Twelve of her thirteen crew were reported missing. She was on a voyage from Philadelphia, Pennsylvania, United States to Amsterdam, North Holland, Netherlands.
City of Bangor	United Kingdom	The schooner was abandoned. Her four crew were rescued by the Porthdinllaen Lifeboat.
City of Rio de Janeiro	United States	The ship was driven ashore at New York. She was on a voyage from Rio de Janeiro, Brazil to New York. She was refloated and taken in to New York.
Clacton	United Kingdom	The schooner was driven ashore at Cleethorpes, Lincolnshire. She was refloated on 1 November.
Comet	Denmark	The schooner was driven ashore and wrecked in Saltwick Bay. Her crew were rescued by rocket apparatus. She was on a voyage from Rochester, Kent to Grangemouth, Stirlingshire, United Kingdom.
Comet	United Kingdom	The ship was driven ashore near North Walsham, Norfolk.
Contest	United Kingdom	The ship departed from Dragør, Denmark for the River Tyne. No further trace, reported missing.
Cuiraisser	United Kingdom	The steamship was driven ashore at Humberston, Lincolnshire. She was refloated on 1 November.
Dash	United Kingdom	The schooner was presumed to have foundered in the North Sea with the loss of all hands.
Dauntless	United Kingdom	The ship was lost in Cresswell Bay with the loss of all hands.
Diana	United Kingdom	The brig was driven ashore south of Grimsby.
Drafna	Norway	The barque was severely damaged and sprang a leak off the coast of County Durham. She was on a voyage from Fredrikshald to South Shields. She put in to Leith, Lothian, United Kingdom for repairs.
Drie Gebroeders	Netherlands	The galiot was wrecked at Hartley, Northumberland, United Kingdom with the loss of two lives. Survivors were rescued by rocket apparatus. She was on a voyage from Great Yarmouth, Norfolk to the River Tyne.
Duck	United Kingdom	The sloop sank at Savanna-la-Mar, Jamaica. She was refloated.
Earl of Derby	United Kingdom	The brig struck Hornsea Pier, Hornsea, Yorkshire, and was wrecked. Her nine crew were rescued by rocket apparatus or climbed onto the pier and made their way to shore.
Earl of Uxbridge	United Kingdom	The schooner was driven ashore at Clone Point, County Wicklow. Her crew were rescued. She was on a voyage from Swansea, Glamorgan to Ramsey, Isle of Man.
Earnest	United Kingdom	The schooner was driven ashore and wrecked 3 nautical miles (5.6 km) south of Amble, Northumberland. Her crew were rescued. She was on a voyage from Trouville-sur-Mer, France to Seaham.
Elemore	United Kingdom	The collier, a steamship, foundered in the North Sea off Huntcliff Foot, Yorkshire with the loss of all hands. She was on a voyage from the River Tyne to London. Wreckage and two bodies from the ship came ashore at Redcar, Yorkshire.
Elfin	United Kingdom	The steamship sank at Glenarm, County Antrim.
Eliza	United Kingdom	The ship was driven ashore between Seaham and Sunderland.
Eliza Benyon	United Kingdom	The ship was wrecked at Dublin. She was on a voyage from Bideford, Devon to Liverpool.
Elizabeth	United Kingdom	The fishing yawl was driven ashore at Whitby, Yorkshire.
Elizabeth and Emma	United Kingdom	The yawl was driven ashore in Robin Hoods Bay with the loss of a crew member.
Elizabeth Austen	United Kingdom	The schooner was abandoned off Whitby. Her five crew were rescued by the Whitby Lifeboat Robert Whitworth ( Royal National Lifeboat Institution). Elizabeth Austen was on a voyage from Rye, Sussex to Sunderland. She came ashore in Saltwick Bay and was wrecked.
Ellen	United Kingdom	The ship was driven ashore and wrecked at Cloughton Wyke, Yorkshire. Her crew were rescued by rocket apparatus. She was on a voyage from Ramsgate, Kent to Newcastle upon Tyne.
Emily	United Kingdom	The schooner was driven ashore south of Grimsby.
Emily and Annie	United Kingdom	The schooner was driven ashore south of Grimsby. She was refloated on 1 November.
Emma	United Kingdom	The fishing yawl was driven ashore at Whitby.
Emma	Sweden	The brig was abandoned in the North Sea with the loss of two of her eight crew. Survivors were rescued by the smack Empress (United Kingdom). Emma was on a voyage from a Swedish port to Hull, Yorkshire. She was subsequently driven ashore and wrecked at Hayburg Wyke, Yorkshire.
Emmanuel Boutcher	United Kingdom	The brig was driven ashore between Marske and Redcar, Yorkshire. Her eight crew were rescued by the Redcar Lifeboat. Emmanuel Boutcher was on a voyage from Rotterdam, South Holland, Netherlands to Whitby. She broke up on 2 November.
Emerald	United Kingdom	The ship foundered off the north east coast of Norfolk with the loss of all hands. Wreckage came ashore at Happisburgh.
Emilie	Russia	The barque was severely damaged at sea. She was towed in to Hull on 29 October by the schooner Celerity (United Kingdom).
Emily	United Kingdom	The ship was driven ashore between Seaham and Sunderland.
Empress	United Kingdom	The schooner capsized in the North Sea off the coast of County Durham with the loss of all hands. She subsequently came ashore a few miles north of Hartlepool.
Express	United Kingdom	The fishing smack was presumed to have foundered in the North Sea with the loss of all six crew.
Express	United Kingdom	The schooner capsized at sea with the loss of all hands. She came ashore at Blackhall Rocks, County Durham on 31 October and was wrecked.
Faderneslandet	Norway	The ship was driven ashore near Grimsby. She was refloated on 3 November and taken in to Hull for repairs.
Ferryside	United Kingdom	The schooner was abandoned in Carmarthen Bay. Her eight crew were rescued by the Ferryside Lideboat.
Five Brothers	United Kingdom	The galiot was driven ashore at Scarborough. Her crew were rescued by the Scarborough Lifeboat.
Flower Girl	United Kingdom	The full-rigged ship was driven ashore and wrecked in Robin Hood's Bay with the loss of her captain.
Flying Dutchman, and Sensation	United Kingdom	The brigantine Sensation was severely damaged at sea. She was on a voyage from Dover, Kent to Sunderland. She was towed in to Hartlepool on 31 October by the paddle tug Flying Dutchman, which was herself severely damaged at sea.
Folkestone	United Kingdom	The brigantine was driven ashore at Middleton, County Durham. Her seven crew were rescued by one of the Hartlepool Lifeboats, either Charles Ingleby or John Clay Barlow (both Royal National Lifeboat Institution). Folkestone was on a voyage from Folkestone, Kent to West Hartlepool.
Fortuna	United Kingdom	The schooner ran aground on rocks in Jenniecliffe Bay, Plymouth, Devon. Her three crew were taken off by the Plymouth Lifeboat Clemency ( Royal National Lifeboat Institution). Fortuna was on a voyage from Caernarfon to London.
Forward	United Kingdom	The ship foundered in the North Sea with the loss of all five crew.
Francis	United Kingdom	The ship was abandoned in the North Sea. Her crew were rescued. She was on a voyage from Riga, Russia to Middlesbrough, Yorkshire.
Fury	United Kingdom	The tug sank at South Shields.
Garibaldi	United Kingdom	The ship was driven ashore south of Tetney Haven.
Garnel	United Kingdom	The fishing trawler was wrecked at Dublin.
Gauntlet	United Kingdom	The smack was driven ashore at Filey, Yorkshire. Five of her crew were rescued.
George Peabody	United Kingdom	The yawl was driven ashore at Bridlington, Yorkshire. She was refloated on 30 October and taken in to Bridlington.
Georgina, Martha, and Topsy	United Kingdom	Martha was driven ashore at Withernsea. She was then run into by the brig Topsy, which was also driven ashore. Topsy was then run into by the brig Georgina, which also drove ashore. All seventeen crew from Georgina and Topsy were rescued by rocket apparatus. Topsy was on a voyage from Newhaven, Sussex to Sunderland.
General Lee	United Kingdom	The yawl was presumed to have foundered in the North Sea with the loss of all nine or ten crew.
Golden Light	United Kingdom	The schooner ran aground on the Potato Garth, off Sunderland. She was on a voyage from Runcorn to Sunderland. She was refloated with assistance on 31 October.
Good Intent	United Kingdom	The fishing boat was driven ashore and wrecked at Whitby. Her crew were either lost, or rescued by the Whitby Lifeboat Robert Whitworth ( Royal National Lifeboat Institution).
Gostoria	United Kingdom	The ship was driven ashore and wrecked at Hartlepool. Her crew were rescued.
Gretina	Germany	The ship was abandoned in the North Sea. Her crew were rescued. She was on a voyage from Bremerhaven to Gothenburg, Sweden.
Gustave	France	The chasse-marée put in to Lowestoft, Suffolk, United Kingdom in a leaky condition and sank.
Harry Clem	United Kingdom	The schooner was driven ashore at North Shields, Northumberland with the loss of two of her six crew. She was on a voyage from Whitstable, Kent to Seaham, County Durham.
Hazard	Norway	The brig was driven ashore and wrecked 2 nautical miles (3.7 km) south of Redcar.
Hebe	United Kingdom	The brig was driven ashore and wrecked at Easington, Yorkshire. Her crew were rescued.
Hebe	United Kingdom	The ship was driven ashore near Grimsby. She was refloated on 1 November.
Heinrich	Flag unknown	The schooner was driven ashore at Whitby.
Helen	United Kingdom	The schooner was driven ashore and wrecked near Blyth, Northumberland. Her crew were rescued.
Henry	Norway	The barque was abdondoned in the North Sea 25 nautical miles (46 km) east of the Lemon Sand. Her crew were rescued by the fishing smack Rival (United Kingdom). Henry was on a voyage from Brevig to Limerick, United Kingdom.
Henry and Elizabeth	United Kingdom	The schooner was driven ashore at Ryhope, County Durham. Her seven crew were rescued.
Henry Brown	United Kingdom	The schooner was driven onto the Baily Lighthouse, County Dublin with the loss of three of her crew.
Herbruder	Netherlands	The galiot was driven ashore at Scarborough with the loss of one of her four crew. Survivors were rescued by the Scarborough Lifeboat.
Herzog Bogislaw	Germany	The barque was abandoned in the North Sea. Her crew were rescued. She was towed in to Grimsby in a derelict condition on 1 November.
Hesper	United Kingdom	The barque was driven ashore south of Grimsby. She was refloated on 31 October and taken in to Grimsby.
Huntley	United Kingdom	The brigantine was driven ashore and wrecked at Hartlepool. Her crew were rescued by rocket apparatus. She was on a voyage from London to the River Tyne.
Ianthe, or Xanthe	United Kingdom	The brigantine was driven ashore and wrecked 2 nautical miles (3.7 km) north of Staithes with the loss of a crew member. She was on a voyage from Gravesend, Kent to South Shields.
Immanuel	Denmark	The schooner was driven ashore and severely damaged at Granton.
Industry	United Kingdom	The brig was driven ashore south of Grimsby.
Iris	United Kingdom	The schooner was driven ashore at South Shields. Her six crew were rescued. She was on a voyage from London to Seaham.
Isabella	United Kingdom	The schooner was driven ashore and wrecked at Flamborough Head. Her crew were rescued.
Isabella Leith	United Kingdom	The ship was driven ashore and wrecked south of West Hartlepool. She was refloated on 31 October.
Isabella Grainger	United Kingdom	The ship was driven ashore 8 nautical miles (15 km) south of Bridlington. Her crew were rescued.
Isis	United Kingdom	The schooner was driven ashore and wrecked at North Shields. Her six crew were rescued. She was on a voyage from London to Seaham.
Jabez, and Silvery Wave	United Kingdom	The sailing barge Jabez collided with the barque Sivery Wave off Withernsea. She drifted out to sea in a sinking condition. Silvery Wave came ashore at between Bridlington and Horsea. Her crew were rescued by rocket apparatus. She was on a voyage from Southampton, Hampshire to Sunderland.
Janet Duncan	United Kingdom	The brig was driven ashore and wrecked at Granton.
Jesse	United Kingdom	The schooner foundered in the North Sea off the mouth of the Humber with the loss of all ten people on board. She was on a voyage from Great Yarmouth to Stockton-on-Tees.
Jeune Adolph	France	The ship was driven ashore at Scarborough. Her nine crew were rescued by the Scarborough Lifeboat Lady Leigh ( Royal National Lifeboat Institution).
Johann	Denmark	The schooner was driven ashore and wrecked at South Shields with the loss of all but one of her crew.
John	United Kingdom	The brig was driven ashore at Plymouth with the loss of her captain.
John	United Kingdom	The ship was wrecked on the Callersea Rocks, off the coast of Yorkshire.
John and Mary	United Kingdom	The brig was driven ashore at Saltburn, Yorkshire. Her crew were rescued. She was consequently condemned.
John Black	United Kingdom	The schooner was driven ashore south of Grimsby. She was refloated on 1 November.
John Canant	United Kingdom	The ship was wrecked on the Cattersea Rocks with the loss of all hands.
John Cook	United Kingdom	The brig was driven ashore and wrecked at Hartlepool, County Durham. Her seven crew were rescued by the Coastguard using rocket apparatus. She was on a voyage from London to the River Tees.
John Mary	United Kingdom	The brig was driven ashore at Stockton-on-Tees, County Durham. Her eight crew survived.
John May	United Kingdom	The brig lost one of her anchors when sheltering from a storm off Plymouth. Setting sail for the Cattewater, John May drifted across the bows of the schooner Reddies (United Kingdom), taking away the schooners bowsprit, topsail-yard along with other damage. John May drifted onto the Mount Batten breakwater, breaking her back. Her captain was drowned; his wife and the rest of the crew were rescued. She was on a voyage from the Bull River to Falmouth, Cornwall and Fredrickstadt, Denmark.
John O. Scott, and an Unnamed vessel	United Kingdom	The steamship John O. Scott was run into by a schooner, which foundered with the loss of all hands. John O. Scott was holed at the bow. She was on a voyage from Havre de Grâce, Seine-Inférieure to Hull. She arrived on 29 October.
John Snell	United Kingdom	The brigantine was driven ashore at Whitby. Her crew were rescued by the Whitby Lifeboat Robert Whitworth ( Royal National Lifeboat Institution). John Snell was on a voyage from Great Yarmouth to Newcastle upon Tyne. She subsequently became a wreck.
John Soles	United Kingdom	The schooner was abandoned off Whitby. Her crew were rescued by the Whitby Lifeboat Robert Whitworth ( Royal National Lifeboat Institution).
Julia	United Kingdom	The brig was driven ashore and severely damaged at Granton.
Jupiter	United Kingdom	The ship was driven ashore south of Tetney Haven.
Knobe Faone	Denmark	The ship foundered off the mouth of the River Tyne with the loss of all hands.
Lady Young	United Kingdom	The barque ran ashore and was wrecked at Bantham, Devon with the loss of a crew member. She was on a voyage from Hamburg, Germany to Cardiff, Glamorgan.
Lavlead Duna, or Liolend	Russia	The schooner was driven ashore at Vestervik, Sweden. She was on a voyage from South Shields to Libava, Courland Governorate. She was declared a total loss.
Lily	(United Kingdom of Great Britain and Ireland) Guernsey	The brig was driven ashore 1 nautical mile (1.9 km) south of Scarborough. Her eighteen crew were rescued by rocket apparatus. She was on a voyage from London to South Shields. She broke up on 31 October.
Lima	United Kingdom	The fishing smack was presumed to have foundered in the North Sea with the loss of all six crew.
Louis	Norway	The brig was driven ashore at Holkham. Her crew were rescued by the Wells Lifeboat.
Louisa	United Kingdom	The ship was abandoned in the North Sea. Her crew were rescued.
Louise	United Kingdom	The ship was driven ashore south of Grimsby.
Luigia II	Italy	The barque was severely damaged off The Lizard, Cornwall United Kingdom. She was on a voyage from Buenos Aires, Argentina to Ostend, Belgium. She was towed in to Cowes, Isle of Wight, United Kingdom by the steamship Cosmopolitan (United Kingdom).
Luna	United Kingdom	The schooner was driven ashore and wrecked south of Coatham, Yorkshire. Her five crew were rescued by a lifeboat. She was on a voyage from Lymington, Hampshire to Sunderland.
Lydia	(United Kingdom of Great Britain and Ireland) Jersey	The ketch was driven ashore south of Grimsby. She had been refloated by 6 November and taken in to Grimsby.
Maal	United Kingdom	The ship was driven ashore at Withernsea.
Macbeth	United Kingdom	The barque was driven ashore and wrecked at Hornsea with the loss of her captain. Seventeen survivors were rescued by rocket apparatus. She was on a voyage from London to Melbourne, Victoria. She was refloated in late December with assistance from the tugs Champion and Victor (both United Kingdom) and towed in to Grimsby.
Magdalen Esther	United Kingdom	The ship was driven ashore and wrecked at Laugharne, Glamorgan with the loss of her captain. Survivors were rescued by the Llanelly Lifeboat.
Maid of Kent	United Kingdom	The schooner was driven ashore south of Grimsby. She was refloated on 1 November.
Maid of Whitby	United Kingdom	The ship was driven ashore at Middleton, County Durham. She was refloated and taken in the Hartlepool.
Margaret	United Kingdom	The barque ran aground on the North Gar, off the coast of County Durham and was wrecked. Her ten crew were rescued. She was on a voyage from Portsmouth to Sunderland.
Margaretha Gezina	Netherlands	The ship was wrecked on the Borcum Reef. Her crew were rescued by Dunbeath Castle (United Kingdom.
Margaret Jones	United Kingdom	The schooner was driven ashore at Middlesbrough. Her crew were rescued.
Maria Elizabeth	United Kingdom	The brig was driven ashore south of Grimsby.
Martha	United Kingdom	The barge was discovered in the Solent by the tug Admiral (United Kingdom). She was towed in to Cowes, Isle of Wight.
Mary	United Kingdom	The brig was driven ashore and severely damaged at Scarborough. Her seven crew were rescued by the Scarborough Lifeboat Lady Leigh ( Royal National Lifeboat Institution). Mary was on a voyage from Newhaven, Sussex to South Shields.
Mary Ann	United Kingdom	The ship was driven ashore and wrecked near Hartley, Northumberland. Her crew were rescued.
Mary Anna	United Kingdom	The schooner was driven ashore and wrecked 1 nautical mile (1.9 km) south of Cresswell, Northumberland. Her crew were rescued. She was on a voyage from Rye to Hartlepool.
Mary Elizabeth	Norway	The barque was driven ashore and wrecked at Dalkey, County Dublin, United Kingdom with the loss of all eleven crew.
Mathilde	Germany	The brig was driven ashore at Cap Gris Nez, Pas-de-Calais with the loss of eight of her ten crew. She was on a voyage from Lagos, Lagos Colony to Flensburg.
Matthew	Germany	The brig was driven ashore at Holmpton, Yorkshire. Her crew were rescued.
Mayfield	United Kingdom	The schooner was driven ashore at Tunstall, Yorkshire. Her crew were rescued by the Coastguard using rocket apparatus.
Mayville	United Kingdom	The schooner was driven ashore at Withernsea.
Mechanic	United Kingdom	The ship was driven ashore at Withernsea with the loss of one of her six crew. Survivors were rescued by rocket apparatus. She was on a voyage from London to Hull.
Messenger	United Kingdom	The brig was driven ashore on Skirt Island, Tresco, Isles of Scilly. Five of her eight crew were rescued by the St. Mary's Lifeboat Henry Dundas ( Royal National Lifeboat Institution); the others remained aboard. Messenger was on a voyage from Cardiff, Glamorgan to Portsmouth, Hampshire. She was refloated on 30 October and taken in to St. Mary's, but was consequently scrapped .
Minna	Germany	The barque was driven ashore and wrecked at Coatham. All on board were rescued. She was on a voyage from London to Newcastle upon Tyne.
Miss Hunt	United Kingdom	The schooner was driven into a number of vessels in Plymouth Sound and was damaged. She was on a voyage from Barrow-in-Furness, Lancashire to Le Tréport, Seine-Inférieure.
Mystery	United Kingdom	The fishing smack was presumed to have foundered in the North Sea with the loss of all six crew.
Nation's Hope	United Kingdom	The steam fishing trawler foundered off North Shields with the loss of all six crew.
Navigator	United Kingdom	The schooner was driven ashore between Humberston and Tetney Haven. She was refloated on 31 October and taken in to Grimsby.
New Fancy	United Kingdom	The schooner was abandoned in Robin Hoods Bay. Her seven crew were rescued by the steamship Adam Smith (United Kingdom. New Fancy was on a voyage from Liverpool, Lancashire to Newcastle upon Tyne. She subsequently came ashore at Scarborough and was wrecked.
Nugget	United Kingdom	The schooner was driven ashore south of Grimsby.
Ocean Queen	United Kingdom	The brig was driven ashore at Holkham. Her crew were rescued.
Olive Branch	United Kingdom	The brig was driven ashore south of Grimsby. She was refloated on 1 November.
Oriel	United Kingdom	The ship was driven ashore south of Tetney Haven.
Ornate	United Kingdom	The ship was driven ashore south of Grimsby. She was refloated on 1 November.
Osprey	United Kingdom	The schooner was driven ashore south of Grimsby.
Papa Olivari	Italy	The barque capsized at Swansea.
Peace	United Kingdom	The ship was driven ashore south of Tetney Haven.
Pinta	United Kingdom	The schooner was driven ashore at Cleethorpes, Lincolnshire. Her crew were rescued. She was later refloated.
Pioneer	United Kingdom	The steam lighter was driven ashore in Greenock Bay.
P. J. F. Burchard	Germany	The barque was driven ashore and wrecked at Burryport, Glamorgan. Her fourteen crew survived. She was on a voyage from Goole, Yorkshire to Newport, Monmouthshire, United Kingdom.
Plymouth	United Kingdom	The schooner was driven into L. C. A. (United Kingdom) at Plymouth and was severely damaged.
Princess Alexandra	United Kingdom	The ship was driven ashore south of Grimsby. She was refloated on 1 November.
Queen Adelaide	United Kingdom	The barquentine was driven ashore and wrecked at Donna Nook, Lincolnshire. Her crew were rescued. She was on a voyage from Portsmouth to Seaham.
Reaper	(United Kingdom of Great Britain and Ireland) Isle of Man	The schooner was driven ashore at Whitby with the loss of her captain, or all but her captain. The survivor(s) being rescued by the Whitby Lifeboat Robert Whitworth ( Royal National Lifeboat Institution).
Reclam	Germany	The kuff was driven ashore south of Grimsby.
Rescue	United Kingdom	The schooner was driven into by the gunboat SMS Möwe (Imperial German Navy) at Plymouth and was severely damaged.
Richard	United Kingdom	The fishing yawl foundered in the Dogger Bank with the loss of all ten crew.
Robert Browne	United Kingdom	The schooner was wrecked near the Baily Lighthouse, County Dublin with the loss of three of her five crew. Survivors were rescued by the Poolbeg Lifeboat. She was on a voyage from Neath, Glamorgan to Warrenpoint, County Antrim.
Robert Henry	United Kingdom	The fishing lugger was driven ashore and wrecked near North Walsham.
Royal Albert	United Kingdom	The schooner was driven ashore and wrecked at West Hartlepool. Her five crew were rescued by the West Hartlepool Lifeboat. She was on a voyage from Southend-on-Sea, Essex to West Hartlepool.
Royal Sovereign	United Kingdom	The brig was driven ashore south of Grimsby.
Royston	United Kingdom	The brig was driven ashore and wrecked at Granton.
Saffron	United Kingdom	The brig was driven through Withernsea Pier and then came ashore at Withernsea. Her crew survived.
Sarah	United Kingdom	The ship was driven ashore at Sandsend, Yorkshire. Her crew were rescued.
Sarah	United Kingdom	The schooner was driven ashore at Upgang, Yorkshire. Her crew were rescued.
Sarah and Mary	United Kingdom	The brigantine foundered in the North Sea off Whitby with the loss of all hands. She was on a voyage from Dieppe, Seine-Inférieure to Sunderland.
Sarah T. Cowley	United Kingdom	The yawl was presumed to have foundered in the North Sea with the loss of all nine crew.
Sceptre	United Kingdom	The ship was driven ashore south of Tetney Haven.
Scotsman	United Kingdom	The brigantine ran aground on the Colhona Bank. She was on a voyage from Troon, Ayrshire to Londonderry. She was refloated and towed in to Londonderry.
Sestos	France	The steamship ran aground in the Danube at "Aegani" and was damaged. She was on a voyage from Marseille, Bouches-du-Rhône to Sulina, United Principalities.
Sharon's Rose	United Kingdom	The brig was driven ashore at Holkham. Her seven crew were rescued by the Wells Lifeboat Eliza Adams ( Royal National Lifeboat Institution).
Sisters	United Kingdom	The sloop was wrecked on Inchcolm, Fife. Her three crew took to a boat; they landed at Queensferry.
Skirner	Denmark	The schooner struck a rock at "Jung Frau" and sank. She was on a voyage from Svendborg to Oskarshamn, Sweden.
Sophia	United Kingdom	The brig was driven ashore south of Grimsby. She had been refloated by 6 November and taken in to Grimsby.
Speculator	United Kingdom	The brig was driven ashore near Grimsby.
Speratus	United Kingdom	The fishing smack was driven ashore at Cleethorpes. She was refloated on 6 November and taken in to Grimsby.
Spray	United Kingdom	The yawl was driven ashore and wrecked at Bridlington.
Stanley	United Kingdom	The paddle tug sank at South Shields.
Start	United Kingdom	The fishing smack foundered in the Dogger Bank with the loss of all nine crew.
St. Joseph	France	The barque collided with the steamship Lykus (United Kingdom) and sank. Her crew were rescued. Joseph was on a voyage from Montevideo, Uruguay to Marseille, Bouches-du-Rhône.
Sultana	United Kingdom	The schooner put in to Hartlepool in a sinking condition.
Susan	United Kingdom	The ship was driven ashore at Bangor, County Down.
Susanne Goddefroy	United Kingdom	The ship sprang a leak and was beached near Newcastle upon Tyne. She was on a voyage from Newcastle upon Tyne to Japan. She subsequently broke up with the loss of six of her crew.
Svalen	United Kingdom	The ketch foundered in the North Sea off the mouth of the Humber with the loss of all ten people on board. She was on a voyage from Ipswich, Suffolk to Newcastle upon Tyne. She came ashore at Theddlethorpe, Lincolnshire in a capsized condition on 13 November.
Tar	United Kingdom	The brig was driven ashore south of Grimsby.
Tees	United Kingdom	The steamship was driven ashore at Coatham. Her twelve crew were rescued by rocket apparatus.
Teesdale	United Kingdom	The steamship was driven ashore at Middlesbrough. Her crew were rescued.
Thetis	United Kingdom	The schooner was driven ashore and wrecked at Plymouth. Her crew were rescued by the Coastguard using rocket apparatus. She was on a voyage from Glasgow, Renfrewshire to Faversham, Kent.
Thetis	United Kingdom	The schooner ran aground at Plymouth. Her crew were rescued by rocket apparatus. She was on a voyage from Dublin to London.
Thrift	United Kingdom	The ship was driven ashore south of Grimsby. She was refloated on 1 November.
Thrift	United Kingdom	The ship was driven ashore between Seaham and Sunderland.
Tiber	United Kingdom	The brig was driven ashore at Holmpton. Her crew were rescued.
Times	United Kingdom	The steamship ran aground in the Belfast Lough. She was on a voyage from London to Swansea and Belfast, County Antrim. She was refloated the next day and taken in to Belfast.
Timsah	United Kingdom	The steamship arrived at New Orleans, Louisiana, United States on fire. She was reported to be on a voyage from Galveston, Texas, United States to London. The fire was extinguished.
Tordenskjold	Norway	The brig was driven ashore at "Onrust", Netherlands. She was on a voyage from Larvik to Dieppe.
Triad	United Kingdom	The ship foundered in the North Sea with the loss of all hands.
Una	United Kingdom	The brig was driven ashore at Tunstall. Her crew were rescued by the Coastguard using rocket apparatus.
Unity	United Kingdom	The steamship put in to Hartlepool in a sinking condition.
U. S. C	United Kingdom	The ship foundered off Huntcliffe Foot with the loss of at least two lives.
Viaduct	United Kingdom	The brig was driven ashore at Holkham. Her six crew were rescued by lifebuoy.
Victoria	United Kingdom	The ship was driven ashore in Robin Hoods Bay. She was on a voyage from Ryde, Isle of Wight to Hartlepool.
Vidar	Sweden	The ship was driven ashore and wrecked at Sutton-on-Sea, Lincolnshire with the loss of all hands. She was on a voyage from Hull to Copenhagen, Denmark.
Waveney	United Kingdom	The brig was driven ashore at Donna Nook, Lincolnshire. Her crew were rescued. She was on a voyage from Great Yarmouth to South Shields.
Whitwell	United Kingdom	The barque was driven ashore near Grimsby.
William Thrift	United Kingdom	The ship was driven ashore near Grimsby. She was refloated on 31 October and taken in to Grimsby.
William	United Kingdom	The ship was driven ashore between Seaham and Sunderland.
Wonga	United Kingdom	The paddle tug-cum-steam trawler was struck by a heavy sea and capsized while making for her home port of North Shields with the loss of her six crew.
Woodlark	United Kingdom	The Yorkshire billyboy was driven ashore at Tetney, Lincolnshire.
W. T. C.	United Kingdom	The ship was wrecked on the Fleet Rocks, off the coast of Yorkshire.
Yarborough	United Kingdom	The fishing smack was presumed to have foundered in the North Sea with the loss of all six crew.
Zeno	United Kingdom	The barque foundered in the North Sea off the mouth of the River Tees with the loss of all ten crew. She was on a voyage from Bilbao, Spain to Aberdeen.
Zetland	United Kingdom	The ship was driven ashore at Cape Henlopen, Delaware, United States. She was on a voyage from Miragoâne, Haiti to the Delaware Breakwater. She was refloated on 30 October with the assistance of a steamship and resumed her voyage.
28	Russia	The lighter sank at Saint Petersburg.
1043	United Kingdom	The steam trawler foundered off Port Mulgrave, Yorkshire with the loss of all hands.
Two unnamed vessels	Flags unknown	The ships were driven ashore at Sandsend.
Three or four unnamed vessels	Flags unknown	The ships were driven ashore in Robin Hood's Bay.
Four unnamed vessels	Flags unknown	The ships were driven ashore at Hornsea.
Many unnamed vessels	Flags unknown	Nearly 30 ships were driven ashore at Donna Nook. Their crews were rescued. Also reported that about 60 vessels were driven ashore south of Grimsby, some of which are listed above. Also reported that 180 vessels were ashore between Grimsby and Mablethorpe, including the 60 south of Grimsby.
Unnamed	Flag unknown	The ship sank off Withernsea with the loss of all hands.
Unnamed	Flag unknown	The ship sank off Kilnsea, Yorkshire with the loss of all hands.
Unnamed	Flag unknown	The schooner was driven ashore and wrecked at "Peak", 7 or 8 nautical miles (13 or 15 km) south of Whitby. Her crew were rescued.
Unnamed	United Kingdom	The ship was wrecked at Dalkey, County Dublin with the loss of five lives.
Unnamed	United Kingdom	The fishing boat sank in the River Liffey at Dublin.
Unnamed	United Kingdom	The ship was driven ashore near Seaham. Her crew were rescued.
Unnamed	Flag unknown	The brig was driven ashore and wrecked in Saltwick Bay with the loss of all hands, about eight lives.
Unnamed	France	The ship was driven ashore and wrecked at Perros-Guirec, Finistère. Her crew were rescued by the Perros-Guirec Lifeboat.
Unnamed	France	The ship was driven ashore and wrecked at Douarnenez, Finistère. Her crew were rescued by the Douarnenez Lifeboat.
Three unnamed vessels	United Kingdom	The luggers were driven ahore at Great Yarmouth.
Unnamed	United Kingdom	The brigantine was abandoned off the Isle of Man. Her five crew were rescued by the Ramsey Lifeboat.
Unnamed	Flag unknown	The schooner foundered in the Irish Sea 12 nautical miles (22 km) north of the Bardsey Lighthouse, Caernarfonshire with the loss of all hands.

== 29 October ==
List of shipwrecks: 29 October 1880
Ship	State	Description
Anniversary	United Kingdom	The brig was driven ashore and wrecked north off Scalby Mills, Yorkshire. Her crew were rescued by rocket apparatus. She was on a voyage from Shoreham-by-Sea, Sussex to Blyth, Northumberland.
Aratus	United Kingdom	The coaster, a brigantine, was abandoned at sea. Her crew were rescued. Aratus was on a voyage from Tynemouth, Northumberland to Runcorn, Cheshire. She was subsequently towed in to Cork by the steamship Harold (United Kingdom).
Arun	United Kingdom	The schooner was driven ashore at Scarborough, North Riding of Yorkshire. Her crew were rescued. She was on a voyage from Littlehampton, Sussex to Sunderland, County Durham.
Arus	United Kingdom	The schooner was driven ashore between Humberston and Tetney Haven, Lincolnshire. She was refloated on 31 October and taken in to Grimsby, Lincolnshire.
August	Flag unknown	The ship was driven ashore near Rostock, Germany.
Bride	United Kingdom	The steamship was driven ashore at New Clee, Lincolnshire. She was on a voyage from Hull, Yorkshire to Sunderland. She was refloated in early November and towed in to Hull.
Carolina	Sweden	The ship was driven ashore south of Whitby, Yorkshire. She subsequently broke up.
Collier	United Kingdom	The steamship ran aground in the Swash, off the coast of Somerset. She was refloated and taken in to Bristol, Gloucestershire.
Comet	United Kingdom	The brigantine was abandoned 20 nautical miles (37 km) west of the Smalls Lighthouse, Cornwall. Her six crew were rescued by the full-rigged ship Minerva (Netherlands). Comet was on a voyage from Teignmouth, Devon to Glasgow, Renfrewshire. She was subsequently towed in to Passage East, County Waterford by the paddle steamer Vulture (United Kingdom).
Dauntless	United Kingdom	The brig was wrecked in Druridge Bay with the loss of all hands.
Deodata	Germany	The schooner ran aground at Dragør, Denmark.
Dido	United Kingdom	The smack was abandoned in the North Sea 70 nautical miles (130 km) off Great Yarmouth, Norfolk with the loss of a crew member. She was towed in to Great Yarmouth in a derelict condition in early November.
Diligencia, or Diligentia	Norway	The brig was driven ashore and wrecked at Aberdeen, United Kingdom with the loss of two of her nine crew. Survivors were rescued by local fishermen. She was on a voyage from Sundsvall, Sweden to Aberdeen.
Eliza Adams	Royal National Lifeboat Institution	Wells lifeboat disaster: The lifeboat capsized off the north Norfolk coast with the loss of eleven of her thirteen crew .
Elizabeth	United Kingdom	The schooner was driven ashore at Filey, Yorkshire. Three of her crew were rescued by rocket apparatus. She was on a voyage from Ipswich, Suffolk to Seaham.
Fedar	United Kingdom	The ship was driven ashore and wrecked at Sutton-on-Sea, Lincolnshire. She was on a voyage from Hull, Yorkshire to Copenhagen, Denmark.
Flying Huntsman	United Kingdom	The steam trawler was struck by a heavy sea and capsized while making for her home port of North Shields, Northumberland with the loss of all six crew.
George Fox	United Kingdom	The brig was drive ashore at Grimsby. She was on a voyage from Rouen, Seine-Inférieure, France to Newcastle upon Tyne, Northumberland.
Glantry	United Kingdom	The schooner was driven ashore at Scarborough. She was on a voyage from Fécamp, Seine-Inférieure to Newcastle upon Tyne, Northumberland.
Gleaner	United Kingdom	The fishing boat was driven ashore and capsized at Sheringham, Norfolk with the loss of one of her ten or eleven crew. Also reported that all ten crew drowned.
Heinrich	Flag unknown	The schooner was driven ashore at Donna Nook, Lincolnshire, United Kingdom.
Heiress	United Kingdom	The brig was driven ashore and wrecked at Maranhão, Brazil. Her crew were rescued. She was on a voyage from Liverpool, Lancashire to Maranhão.
India	Canada	The barque was abandoned in the Atlantic Ocean 400 nautical miles (740 km) off Cape Cear Island, County Cork. Her crew were rescued by the steamship Artisana (United Kingdom). India was on a voyage from Quebec City to Liverpool, Lancashire, United Kingdom.
Jeanne Eugénie	France	The ship was driven ashore on the Île de Ré, Charente-Inférieure. She was on a voyage from Lorient, Charente-Inférieure to Gloucester, United Kingdom.
John and Lillie	United Kingdom	The ship was driven ashore at Hunstanton, Norfolk. She was refloated and taken in to King's Lynn, Norfolk in a leaky condition.
J. Prizeman	United Kingdom	The schooner was driven ashore at Scarborough. Her crew were rescued by the Scarborough Lifeboat. She was on a voyage from Plymouth, Devon to Newcastle upon Tyne. She subsequently broke up.
Katherine	United Kingdom	The ship was driven ashore at Blakeney, Norfolk. Her crew were rescued by the Blakeney Lifeboat. She was on a voyage from Lyme Regis, Dorset to Sunderland.
Lyon	United Kingdom	The steamship struck the pier at Ostend, West Flanders, Belgium and was damaged. She was on a voyage from Sunderland to Ostend.
Margaret and Mary	United Kingdom	The schooner struck rocks off Inchcolm, Fife and was damaged. She was assisted in to Limekilns, Fife in a severely leaky condition.
Naiad	United Kingdom	The ship ran aground at Hartlepool, County Durham. She was on a voyage from London to Hartlepool. She was refloated and taken in to Hartlepool.
New Parliament	United Kingdom	The ship was abandoned in the Atlantic Ocean 180 nautical miles (330 km) west by north of the Isles of Scilly. Her crew were rescued by Ebenezer ( Canada). New Parliament was on a voyage from Great Yarmouth to Sligo.
Norton	United Kingdom	The barque was abandoned in the Atlantic Ocean. Her crew were rescued by the full-rigged ship Emblem (United Kingdom). Norton was on a voyage from Chatham, New Brunswick, Canada to Belfast. She was discovered on 30 October at 49°28′N 13°35′W by the barque Monte A. (Italy), which reported her position to the tug Challenger (United Kingdom). She was discovered by Challenger 220 nautical miles (410 km) west of the Fastnet Rock. Challenger put some of her crew aboard and took her in tow. On 1 November, Challenger discovered the disabled barque Minerva (Italy), on a voyage from New York to Hull, Yorkshire and took her in tow. Both vessels were taken in to Queenstown, County Cork.
Novena	United Kingdom	The brigantine was wrecked in Robin Hoods Bay with the loss of five of her seven crew. She was on a voyage from Teignmouth, Devon to Newcastle upon Tyne. Also reported as wrecked 28 nautical miles (52 km) south of Robin Hoods Bay.
Phœnix	Norway	The schooner was abandoned in the North Sea (56°15′N 1°40′E). Her crew were rescued by the schooner Westerlinden (Norway). Phœnix was on a voyage from Newcastle upon Tyne to Kristiansand.
Propontis	United Kingdom	The steamship ran aground 14 nautical miles (26 km) north of Zafarana Point, Egypt. She was on a voyage from Antwerp, Belgium to Manila, Spanish East Indies.
Rapid	United Kingdom	The ship foundered in the North Sea south of Seaham.
Scotia	United Kingdom	The barque was abandoned in the Atlantic Ocean. Her 27 crew were rescued by Aalang (Norway). Scotia was on a voyage from Quebec City, Canada to Liverpool. She was towed in to Queenstown, County Cork in a waterlogged condition by the tug Wrestler (United Kingdom) on 7 November.
Sensation	United Kingdom	The brigantine was severely damaged at anchor 4 nautical miles (7.4 km) south of Whitby. She was on a voyage from Dover, Kent to Sunderland. She was towed in to Hartlepool by a tug.
Seven Sisters	United Kingdom	The brigantine was driven ashore at Seaham. Her six crew were rescued by rocket apparatus.
St. Clair	United Kingdom	The steamship struck a rock and sank off Tiree, Outer Hebrides. Her crew were rescued. She was on a voyage from Glasgow, Renfrewshire to the Outer Hebrides.
Summerside	United Kingdom	The ship was driven ashore at Tetney, Lincolnshire. She was refloated on 6 November and taken in to Grimsby.
Svalen	Flag unknown	The schooner was driven ashore near Rostock.
Unity	United Kingdom	The ship foundered in the North Sea off Whitby with the loss of all hands.
Vengeance	United Kingdom	The brigantine was wrecked on Sully Island, Glamorgan. She was on a voyage from Morlaix, Finistère, France to Cardiff, Glamorgan.
Water Lily	United Kingdom	The ship was driven ashore south of Grimsby. She was refloated on 1 November.
Woodsturn	Norway	The brig was abandoned in the North Sea off the Dowsing Sandbank. Her nine crew were rescued by the barque Offspring (United Kingdom). Woodsturn was on a voyage from Fredrikshald to Antwerp, Belgium.
W. C. T.	United Kingdom	The ship was driven ashore and wrecked at Saltburn, Yorkshire with the loss of all hands.
Wilker	United Kingdom	The ship was driven ashore. She was on a voyage from Libava, Courland Governorate to Macduff, Aberderdeenshire. She was refloated and taken in to Gothenburg, Sweden.
Zosteria	United Kingdom	The steamship was driven ashore midway between Ryhope, and Seaham, County Durham with the loss of a crew member. She had been refloated by 8 November and taken in to Sunderland.
69	Russia	The lighter was sunk by ice at Saint Petersburg.
Unnamed	Netherlands	The ship was driven ashore at Scarborough. Her crew were rescued.
Several vessels	Flags unknown	Eleven or twelve ships were driven ashore at Scarborough. Their crews were rescued Two of the vessels were schooners.
Unnamed	Flag unknown	The brig was driven ashore at Marske-by-the-Sea, North Riding of Yorkshire. Her nine crew were rescued by the Redcar Lifeboat Burton-on-Trent ( Royal National Lifeboat Institution).

== 30 October ==
List of shipwrecks: 30 October 1880
Ship	State	Description
Aquia	United Kingdom	The ship was driven ashore and wrecked 1 nautical mile (1.9 km) south of Stallingborough, Lincolnshire with the loss of all hands. She was on a voyage from Poole, Dorset to Middlesbrough, Yorkshire.
Canada	Norway	The barque was abandoned in the North Sea. Her twelve crew were rescued by the steam cutter Africa (United Kingdom). Canada was towed in to Bremen, Germany by the steamship Secundo (Germany) on 5 November.
Carolina	Sweden	The schooner was driven ashore in Køge Bay. She was on a voyage from Sundsvall to West Hartlepool, County Durham, United Kingdom.
Dankbarheit	Flag unknown	The ship was abandoned in the Atlantic Ocean. Her crew were rescued. She was on a voyage from Doboy, Georgia, United States to Shoreham-by-Sea, Sussex, United Kingdom.
Dolores	United Kingdom	The schooner was wrecked at Aithsting, Shetland Islands. Her crew were rescued. She was on a voyage from the Shetland Islands to Glasgow, Renfrewshire.
Draupner	Norway	The brig was driven ashore and wrecked in Lofata Bay, near Gävle, Sweden. She was on a voyage from Gävle to Chatham, Kent, United Kingdom.
Eleanor	United Kingdom	The ship was abandoned in the Atlantic Ocean. Her crew were rescued by the barque Agostino D. (Italy). Eleanor was on a voyage from Quebec City, Canada to Belfast, County Antrim.
Esther	United Kingdom	The steamship collided with the steamship Marianne Briggs (United Kingdom) and sank in the Seine 3 nautical miles (5.6 km) downstream of Quillebeuf-sur-Seine, Seine-Inférieure, France. Her crew were rescued.
Express	United Kingdom	The ship was driven ashore and wrecked at Harwich, Essex. Her crew were rescued.
Fanny Rapson, and Robert Adamson	United Kingdom	The schooner Fanny Rapson collided with the schooner Robert Adamson (United Kingdom) in the North Sea and was severely damaged. She put in to Grimsby, Lincolnshire. Robert Adamson was beached at Cleethorpes, Lincolnshire. She was refloated on 31 October and taken in to Grimsby.
Felicité	France	The schooner was abandoned in the North Sea. She was subsequently towed in to the Nieuwe Diep. She was on a voyage from Stettin, Germany to Caen, Calvados.
Frise	Norway	The barque was driven ashore and wrecked at Östergarn, Sweden. She was on a voyage from Vyborg to Marseille, Bouches-du-Rhône, France.
George Lübeck	Germany	The steamship was driven ashore at "Hulgen".
Hazard	Norway	The brig was driven ashore and wrecked 2 nautical miles (3.7 km) south of Redcar, Yorkshire. She was on a voyage from Dover, Kent to Grimstad.
Humboldt, and Mary Hough	United Kingdom	The steamhips collided in the River Mersey and were severely damaged. Humboldt was on a voyage from Liverpool, Lancashire to Bahia, Brazil. Mary Hough was on a voyage from Liverpool to London. Both vessels put back to Liverpool.
Industry	United Kingdom	The sloop ran aground on the Whiting Sand. She was on a voyage from London to Goole, Yorkshire. She was refloated and assisted in to King's Lynn, Norfolk in a severely leaky condition.
Iris	United Kingdom	The Yorkshire Billyboy was driven ashore at Coatham, Yorkshire.
Keritai	Germany	The barque was driven ashore in Køge Bay. She was on a voyage from Hartlepool, County Durham to Swinemünde.
Laurel	United Kingdom	The sloop foundered 1 nautical mile (1.9 km) south of "Skittlehaven", Lincolnshire with the loss of all hands.
London	United Kingdom	The ship was driven ashore in the River Ouse opposite Blacktoft, Lincolnshire.
Maria	Sweden	The brig was abandoned in the North Sea 30 nautical miles (56 km) east of Yorkshire with the loss of a crew member. Survivors were rescued by the smack Empress (United Kingdom).
Nerissa	United Kingdom	The steamship collided with a derelict full-rigged ship in the Atlantic Ocean (50°57′N 20°30′W) and was damaged at the bow. She was on a voyage from Philadelphia, Pennsylvania, United States to Rotterdam, South Holland, Netherlands. She put in to Falmouth, Cornwall on 3 November sinking at the bow.
Odin	Norway	The barque was discovered abandoned and on fire in the North Sea (55°50′N 5°00′E) by the steamship Orlando (United Kingdom).
Otilla	Germany	The barque caught fire and was abandoned in the North Sea. She was discovered by the smack Francis Scott, which towed her in to Hull, Yorkshire.
Selkirkshire	United Kingdom	The barque collided with the Nab Lightship ( Trinity House) and was severely damaged at the bow. She was on a voyage from King's Lynn to Cardiff, Glamorgan. She was towed in to Cowes, Isle of Wight.
Unomia	Norway	The barque was driven ashore. She was on a voyage from Ahlafors, Sweden to Plymouth, Devon, United Kingdom. She was refloated and take in to Copenhagen, Denmark.
Wilhelm Tersmeden	Norway	The brig was drive ashore in Køge Bay. She was on a voyage from Hudiksvall, Sweden to Rochester, Kent.
William and Catherine	United Kingdom	The drifter was driven ashore and wrecked on Skokholm. Her crew survived.
Unnamed	Flag unknown	The brigantine ran aground in The Wash.
Unnamed	Flag unknown	The barque caught fire off Ouessant, Finistère, France.

== 31 October ==
List of shipwrecks: 31 October 1879
Ship	State	Description
Amanda	Sweden	The brig was abandoned 20 nautical miles (37 km) off "Egen". Her crew were rescued by the smacks Active and Lahloo (both United Kingdom). Amanda was on a voyage from Skellefteå to Antwerp, Belgium. She was towed in to Ijmuiden, North Holland, Netherlands in a waterlogged condition on 2 November.
Canada	Norway	The barque was abandoned in the Atlantic Ocean (48°00′N 15°40′W). Her crew were rescued by Countess of Devon (United Kingdom). Canada was on a voyage from Quebec City, Canada to London, United Kingdom.
Deveron	United Kingdom	The schooner was driven ashore at St Margaret's Hope, Orkney Islands.
Ernest Blanche	France	The brig was driven ashore on Amager, Denmark.
Faerder	Norway	The ship sprang a leak and put in to Leith, Lothian, United Kingdom. She was on a voyage from Grangemouth, Stirlingshire, United Kingdom to Christiania.
Fanny	United Kingdom	The brig struck the breakwater, capsized and sank at Ayr. She was on a voyage from Belfast, County Antrim to Ayr.
Fortuna	Norway	The brig was driven ashore on Amager.
Horden	United States	The steamship caught fire whilst on a voyage from Port Royal, South Carolina to Liverpool, Lancashire. She put in to Tybee Island, Georgia, United States.
Ivo Bei	Austria-Hungary	The barque foundered off "Pizano". She was on a voyage from Trieste to Bordeaux, Gironde, France.
Lessing	Germany	The barque was driven ashore and wrecked on Læsø, Denmark.
Lightning	United Kingdom	The sloop was driven ashore at St Margaret's Hope.
Silver Cloud	United Kingdom	The schooner was towed in to Hull, Yorkshire in a derelict condition by two smacks. She was on a voyage from Runcorn, Cheshire to Newcastle upon Tyne.
Speed	United Kingdom	The schooner was driven ashore at Snogebæk, Denmark. She was on a voyage from Danzig, Germany to Boulogne, Pas-de-Calais, France. She was refloated.
Thurle	Flag unknown	The steamship was driven ashore between Skellefteå and Umeå, Sweden. All on board were rescued.
Unnamed	Flag unknown	The barge sank off "Crowlink". Wreckage subsequently came ashore at Beachy Head, Sussex, United Kingdom.

== Unknown date ==
List of shipwrecks: Unknown date in October 1879
Ship	State	Description
Aafke Catharina	Netherlands	The crewless kuff was towed in to Swinemünde, Germany in a waterlogged condition by the steamship Meta (Germany). Also reported that Meta was towed in to Swinemünde by Aafle Catharina.
Actif	Norway	The barque was wrecked on Flores Island, Azores. Her crew were rescued.
Ada	United Kingdom	The schooner ran aground in the Hoorn Islands on or before 15 October. She was on a voyage from Singapore, Straits Settlements to Mauritius. She had been refloated by 24 November.
Adcone	Germany	The ship sank. Her crew were rescued. She was on a voyage from Shanghai to another Chinese port.
Adeline	(United Kingdom of Great Britain and Ireland) Jersey	The schooner was abandoned at sea. Her crew were rescued by the barque Charles Deering (United States). Adeline was on a voyage from Labrador, Newfoundland Colony to Jersey. She was discovered on 3 November by Assyrian (United Kingdom), which placed a prize crew aboard. They took Adeline in to Queenstown, County Cork on 8 November.
Adeone	Germany	The ship sank. Her crew were rescued. She was on a voyage from Shanghai to another Chinese port.
Alderman Ferries	United Kingdom	The fishing smack was driven ashore and wrecked near Saltfleet Haven, Lincolnshire. Her crew were rescued.
Alerte	Russia	The schooner was driven ashore on Öland, Sweden. She was refloated and taken in to a port.
Alpina	United States	The steamship foundered in Lake Michigan with the loss of all on board, between 60 and 70 lives. She was on a voyage from Grandhaven, Michigan to Chicago, Illinois.
Argo	Norway	The barque was driven ashore at Gothenburg, Sweden. She was on a voyage from Riga, Russia to the Nieuwe Diep. She was refloated with assistance and taken in to Gothenburg.
Ariel	United Kingdom	The smack was abandoned in the North Sea 100 nautical miles (190 km) north east of Spurn Point, Yorkshire with the loss of two of her five crew. Survivors were rescued by the smack Rachel Annie (United Kingdom). Ariel was taken in to Hull, Yorkshire in a derelict condition in early November by the smack Knight Errant (United Kingdom).
Augusta	Sweden	The barque was taken in to Swinemünde in a derelict and waterlogged condition. She was on a voyage from Söderhamn to Grimsby, Lincolnshire.
Broederschap	Netherlands	The brig was abandoned in the Baltic Sea.
Burgomeister Showing	Norway	The barque was abandoned in the Atlantic Ocean before 24 October.
Castle Roy	United Kingdom	The full-rigged ship ran aground in the Strait of Sunda. She was on a voyage from Singapore to London. She was refloated with assistance from the steamship Kedine (Netherlands).
Cecrops	Denmark	The schooner was driven ashore at Kastrup. She was on a voyage from Bergkvara, Sweden to Leith, Lothian.
Charlotte	United Kingdom	The brigantine sprang a leak and foundered on or before 22 October. Her crew were rescued by Flor de Ilano (Portugal). Charlotte was on a voyage from Pomaron, Portugal to Plymouth, Devon.
Constitution	United Kingdom	The ship was driven ashore at "Belsiantis", Quebec, Canada. Her crew were rescued.
Dalbeattie	United Kingdom	The steamship was damaged by fire whilst on a voyage from Havre de Grâce, Seine-Inférieure, France to Galveston, Texas, United States.
Delta	United Kingdom	The brigantine foundered at sea. Her crew were rescued. She was on a voyage from Halifax, Nova Scotia to Kingston, Jamaica.
Deodata	Norway	The schooner ran aground at Dragör.
Devonshire	United States	The barque was wrecked at the mouth of the Gironde. Her crew were rescued. She was on a voyage from Baltimore, Maryland to Bordeaux, Gironde. She subsequently broke up.
Dido	Brazil	The steamship was wrecked on rocks at "Visen". She was on a voyage from Paraníba to Pára.
Elisa	Russia	The barque was driven ashore west of Domesnes, Courland Governorate with the loss of a crew member. She was on a voyage from Lisbon, Portugal to Riga.
Elise	Netherlands	The schooner was abandoned at sea. Her six crew were rescued by the barque Ocean Mail (Norway). Elise was on a voyage from Harlingen, Friesland to Riga.
Enterprise	United Kingdom	The barque was abandoned in the North Sea. She was taken in to Vlissingen, Zeeland, Netherlands by a Belgian pilot boat on 31 October.
Eva	(Russian Empire) Grand Duchy of Finland	The schooner was abandoned in the North Sea before 6 October. Her crew were rescued by a Swedish brig. She was subsequently boarded by two crew of the fishing trawler Doctor Kenealy (United Kingdom). Eva was then driven ashore and wrecked at Marshchapel, Lincolnshire, United Kingdom. Both people on board were rescued by the Donna Nook Lifeboat Richard ( Royal National Lifeboat Institution). Eva was on a voyage from Grimsby to Turku.
Five Sisters	United Kingdom	The schooner foundered in the English Channel with the loss of all five crew after 5 October. She was on a voyage from Hull to Weymouth, Dorset. Wreckage was sighted off Weymouth.
Flamsteed	United Kingdom	The steamship was damaged by fire at New Orleans, Louisiana, United States.
Francesco C.	Flag unknown	The ship was wrecked at "Playa Honda", Martín García Island, Uruguay. She was on a voyage from Marseille to Rosario, Brazil. She had been refloated by 4 October.
Fritz Reuter	Germany	The ship caught fire off Anjer, Netherlands East Indies. She was on a voyage from Cardiff, Glamorgan, United Kingdom to Batavia, Netherlands East Indies.
Fusi Yama	United Kingdom	The steamship ran aground at Yenikale, Russia. She was on a voyage from Taganrog, Russia to London. She was refloated on 28 October.
Giambattista Primo	Italy	The ship was driven ashore and wrecked on Hog Island, Maryland, United States. Her crew were rescued. She was on a voyage from Ipswich, Suffolk, United Kingdom to Baltimore.
Graf Wedel	Germany	The brig was driven ashore and wrecked at Durban, Natal Colony with the loss of four of her crew.
Gustav	Germany	The brig was wrecked on the west coast of Sakhalin, Russia.
Haabet	Denmark	The schooner ran aground at Copenhagen whilst avoiding a collision with another vessel. She was on a voyage from Nyköping, Sweden to London. She was refloated and taken in to Copenhagen.
Hans	Germany	The schooner foundered in the Baltic Sea off the coast of the Courland Governorate with the loss of all hands.
Hartlepool	United Kingdom	The brig was driven ashore and wrecked 2 nautical miles (3.7 km) north of Kettleness, Yorkshire. Her crew were rescued.
Helène Pauline	Sweden	The ship was driven ashore at Nidingen. She was on a voyage from Gävle to Hartlepool, County Durham. She was refloated.
Helen Marshall	United Kingdom	The schooner was abandoned in the North Sea on or before 18 October. Her crew were rescued. She was subsequently discovered by a smack, which put a crew aboard. They took her in to Great Yarmouth, Norfolk in a derelict condition on 19 October.
Henrietta et Jane	France	The brig foundered at sea. Her crew were rescued by the barque Broughton (United Kingdom). Henrietta was on a voyage from Swansea, Glamorgan to Cádiz, Spain.
Hercules	United Kingdom	The ship was driven ashore at "Biagor". She was refloated and put in to Copenhagen.
Highland Lass	Canada	The schooner was wrecked on the coast of the Newfoundland Colony before 8 October.
Imacons	Norway	The barque was driven ashore near Vyborg, Grand Duchy of Finland.
Iris	Austria-Hungary	The ship was driven ashore at Santa Croce, Venice, Italy. She was on a voyage from Hull to Venice.
James Bailey	United States	The full-rigged ship was driven ashore and wrecked at Hainan, China. Her crew were rescued. She was on a voyage from Hong Kong to Vancouver Island, British Columbia, Canada.
Jedderen	Denmark	The barque ran aground on Saltholmen. She was refloated and taken in to Copenhagen.
J. M. Lennard	United Kingdom	The steamship was driven ashore near Pärnu, Russia. She was on a voyage from Kronstadt, Russia to Pärnu. She was refloated with assistance.
John and Dan	Russia	The brig ran aground on the East Bank, in the Baltic Sea and sprang a severe leak. She was on a voyage from Charlestown, Cornwall, United Kingdom to Riga.
Josephine	United Kingdom	The ship was beached on the coast of Sierra Leone. She was on a voyage from Liverpool to the Mellacorée River. She was consequently condemned.
Kate Upham	United Kingdom	The brigantine was driven ashore at Saint John, New Brunswick, Canada.
Killeena	United Kingdom	The barque was abandoned in the Atlantic Ocean 300 nautical miles (560 km) west of Cape Clear Island, County Cork. Her crew were rescued. Killeena was on a voyage from New York, United States to a British port. She was discovered on 15 October by the barque Beatrice ( Canada), which put five of her crew on board. Killeena was subsequently towed in to Falmouth, Cornwall by the steamship Leipsic (Germany). Also reported that the barque Dora (Norway) was the vessel that discovered Killeena and put a prize crew aboard.
Knyggen	Norway	The barque ran aground on Arholma, Sweden.
Lily	United Kingdom	The ship foundered with the loss of all hands. She was on a voyage from Cardiff to Cork.
Lord of the Isles	United Kingdom	The barque was wrecked on the west coast of Sakhalin.
Lothair	United Kingdom	The sailing barge collided with another vessel. She was subsequently taken in to King's Lynn, Norfolk in a derelict condition by Blessing (United Kingdom).
Lucinde	United Kingdom	The ship collided with the pier at Lowestoft, Suffolk and was severely damaged.
Lutto	Netherlands	The ship was driven ashore near Harlingen, Friesland. She was on a voyage from Pensacola, Florida, United States to Harlingen. She was refloated and taken in to Harlingen, but was consequently condemned.
Lyna	Norway	The barque was driven ashore and wrecked at Falsterbo. She was on a voyage from Sandviken, Sweden to Grimsby.
Madeleine	United Kingdom	The brig sprang a leak and sank 35 nautical miles (65 km) off the Isles of Scilly, United Kingdom. Her crew were rescued by the brig Herden (Norway.
Margaret	United Kingdom	The fishing lugger was driven ashore at Ardglass, County Down. Her crew survived.
Margaret	United Kingdom	The barque was abandoned at sea before 28 October. Her crew were rescued. She was on a voyage from Mobile, Alabama, United States to Greenock, Renfrewshire.
Maria	United Kingdom	The ship was driven ashore in Riga Bay. Her crew were rescued.
Maria	Denmark	The schooner ran aground at "Stubben". She was on a voyage from Piteå, Sweden to Hull. She was refloated and resumed her voyage.
Marys	United Kingdom	The ship was wrecked on the Black Rock with the loss of three of her six crew.
Mathilde	Spain	The barque was abandoned in the Atlantic Ocean before 29 October. Her crew were rescued. She was on a voyage from Manila, Spanish East Indies to Liverpool.
May	United Kingdom	The ship was towed in to Swinemünde, Germany in a waterlogged condition. She was on a voyage from Kotka, Grand Duchy of Finland to Leith.
Minerva	United Kingdom	The ship ran aground on the Leman and Ower Sand, in the North Sea. She was refloated and towed in to Grimsby in a leaky condition.
Miss Thornton	United Kingdom	The schooner ran aground on the Nieuwezand. Her crew were rescued. She was on a voyage from Wisbech, Cambridgeshire to Rotterdam, South Holland, Netherlands.
Montague	United Kingdom	The ship was driven ashore in Bideford Bay.
Morna	United Kingdom	The barquentine was driven ashore in Green Bay.
Neapel	Germany	The steamship was driven ashore at "Gronboge".
Ophir	Norway	The brig struck the pier at Maassluis, South Holland and sprang a leak. She was on a voyage form Rotterdam to Cardiff. She put back to Rotterdam for repairs.
Othello	Flag unknown	The barque foundered in the North Sea with the loss of all but one of her crew. The survivor was rescued on 31 October by the steamship Genova (Flag unknown).
Pallas	Norway	The ship was abandoned off the "Holman Lighthouse".
Pretoria	United Kingdom	The steamship was driven ashore at Segersted, Öland, Sweden. She was on a voyage from Kronstadt to the Black Sea. She was refloated.
R. C. Wright	United Kingdom	The ship was wrecked. She was on a voyage from Rio de Janeiro, Brazil to Baltimore.
Reaper	(United Kingdom of Great Britain and Ireland) Isle of Man	The schooner was driven ashore and wrecked at Whitby with the loss of all but her captain.
Rescue	United Kingdom	The ship was driven ashore at Stege, Denmark. She was on a voyage from Kronstadt, Russia to London.
Ricardo	Brazil	The brig was driven ashore and wrecked at Montevideo, Uruguay.
Robert Park	United Kingdom	The ship foundered off the Kent coast. Wreckage came ashore at Kingsgate and Margate, Kent.
Rosita	United Kingdom	The ship ran aground in Lake Saint Pierre. She was on a voyage from Montreal, Quebec to Swansea.
Saint Clair	United Kingdom	The steamship struck a rock and sank off Coll, Inner Hebrides. Her crew were rescued.
Saucy Maid	United Kingdom	The lugger was run into by Mary Ann Matilda in the North Sea with the loss of three of her crew. Survivors were rescued by Mary Ann Matilda.
Secret	United Kingdom	The fishing smack was driven ashore and wrecked at Filey, Yorkshire. Her six crew were rescued by rocket apparatus.
Sirhowey	United Kingdom	The brigantine sprang a leak and was abandoned in the Irish Sea. Her crew were rescued by the schooner Prince (United Kingdom). Sirhowey was on a voyage from Honfleur, Manche, France to Ardrossan, Ayrshire.
Solertia	Norway	The brig was driven ashore on Öland, Sweden. She was on a voyage from Kotka to King's Lynn, Norfolk. She was refloated and taken in to Copenhagen in a waterlogged condition.
Soredderin Arundel	Norway	The barque foundered 14 nautical miles (26 km) off the Isles of Scilly. Her nine crew were rescued by Leonore (Flag unknown). Soredderin Arundel was on a voyage from Riga to Brest, Finistère, France.
St. Louis	United Kingdom	The steamship ran aground in the Mississippi River 6 nautical miles (11 km) downstream of New Orleans. She was on a voyage from New Orleans to Liverpool.
Strassberg	Norway	The barque was abandoned in the North Sea on or after 28 October. Her fifteen crew were rescued by fishing boats. She was on a voyage from London to Skien.
Svea	Sweden	The barque was driven ashore at Gothenburg. She was on a voyage from Gävle to Gibraltar.
Temeraria	Spain	The brig ran aground at Colonia del Sacramento, Uruguay. She was refloated.
Tickler	United Kingdom	The ship was driven ashore at Arichat, Nova Scotia. She was refloated.
Transit	United Kingdom	The ship was driven ashore and wrecked at Tignish, Prince Edward Island, Canada. Her crew were rescued. She was on a voyage from Liverpool to Miramichi, New Brunswick.
Triad	United Kingdom	The schooner was driven ashore and wrecked on the Gulland Sands, 5 nautical miles (9.3 km) north of North Berwick, Lothian.She was on a voyage from Kennetpans, Clackmannanshire to Caen, Calvados, France.
Ulster	Canada	The ship was abandoned in the Atlantic Ocean before 12 October.
Universe	United Kingdom	The barque was driven ashore at Östergärn, Gotland, Sweden. She was subsequently refloated and towed in to Slite, Sweden by the steamship Hermes (Sweden). Universe was condemned.
Urdur	Norway	The brig was driven ashore at "Lettapach", Russia. She was on a voyage from Kunda to Narva.
Verona	United Kingdom	The brig was driven ashore at Rone, Gotland, Sweden. Her crew were rescued. She was on a voyage from Rotterdam to Helsinki, Grand Duchy of Finland. She subsequently became a wreck. She had become a wreck by 4 November.
Via	United Kingdom	The ship was abandoned off the Hats and Barrels Rocks. Her crew survived. She was on a voyage from Teignmouth, Devon to Runcorn, Cheshire.
W. A. Holcombe	United States	The ship was driven ashore at Long Beach, New York. She was on a voyage from Iloilo, Spanish East Indies to New York. She was declared a total loss.
Walker	United Kingdom	The ship was driven ashore. She was of a voyage from Libava, Courland Governorate to Macduff, Aberdeenshire. She was refloated and taken in to Gothenburg, where she arrived on 29 October.
Warfhuizen	(flag) Netherlands	The kuff was driven ashore at "Carlos", Russia. She was on a voyage from Reval to Saint Petersburg.
Wilhelmina	Norway	The barque was driven ashore at Falsterbo. She was on a voyage from Härnösand, Sweden to Dundee, Forfarshire, United Kingdom.
William VI	United Kingdom	The schooner was abandoned off Grand-Bassam, Ivory Coast between 7 and 10 October. She subsequently sank.
Wilmington	United States	The ship was abandoned. Her crew were rescued. She was on a voyage from Shanghai, China to Hamburg.
Witch	United Kingdom	The ship was abandoned in the Atlantic Ocean before 26 October. Her crew were rescued. She was on a voyage from Saint Thomas to Sierra Leone.
Zes Gezusters	Netherlands	The full-rigged ship arrived at Anjer on fire. She was on a voyage from IJmuiden, North Holland to Batavia. She was a total loss.
73 unnamed vessels	Flags unknown	Seventeen vessels were wrecked and 66 were damaged in Lake Huron and Lake Michigan with the loss of 93 lives.
Unnamed	Flag unknown	The fishing smack was run down and sunk off Maassluis, South Holland, Netherlands by the steamship Bothal (United Kingdom) with the loss of two of the sixteen people on board. Survivors were rescued by Bothal.
'Unnamed	Flag unknown	The brig foundered off Whitby with the loss of all hands.
