= Eliza Adams Lifeboat Memorial =

Memorial in Wells-Next-the-Sea, Norfolk, England

Coordinates: 52°57′29″N 0°51′01″E

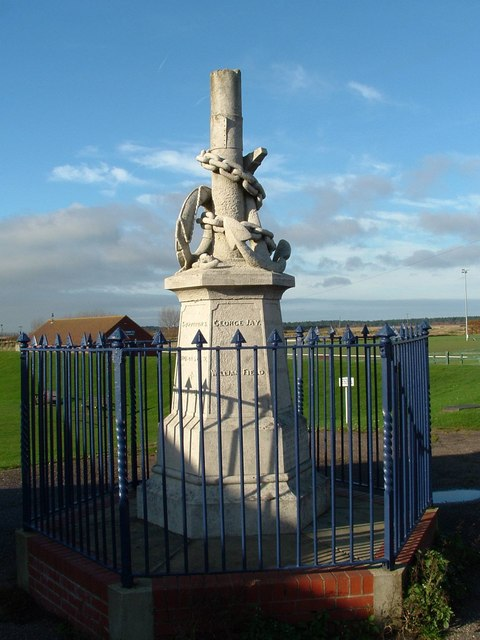
Eliza Adams Lifeboat Memorial

The Eliza Adams Lifeboat Memorial is a grade II listed memorial in Wells-next-the-Sea in Norfolk. It commemorates the death of 11 members of an RNLI lifeboat crew, who died in 1880 when a wave capsized their boat, in what is now known as the Wells lifeboat disaster.
