= Wells lifeboat disaster =

1880 maritime incident in Norfolk, England

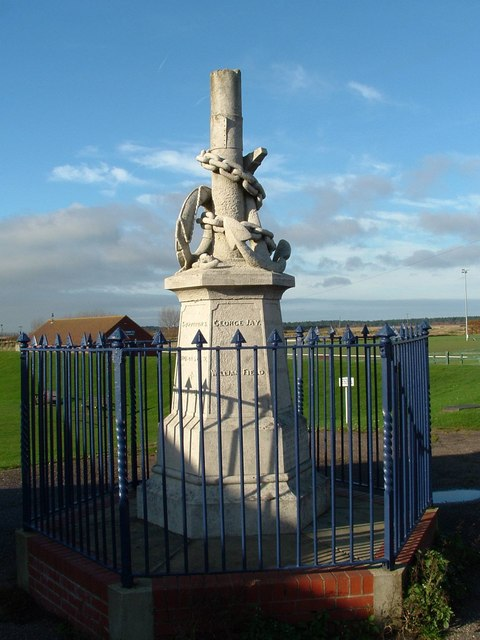
Shipwreck rescue memorial, Wells next the Sea

The Wells lifeboat disaster occurred in 1880 when the RNLI lifeboat Eliza Adams, based at Wells-next-the-Sea in the English county of Norfolk, attempted to go to the aid of the stricken brig Ocean Queen in heavy seas and was lost along with 11 of its 13 crew.

The Wells lifeboat was an open boat propelled by a combination of oars and sail, based at the old lifeboat house on the quay at the head of Wells Harbour. Because of the strong tides in the mile long channel that connects the quay with the harbour mouth, it was common for the lifeboat to use the services of a steam tug to be towed to sea.

On 29 October 1880, gales were lashing the north coast of Norfolk. The Ocean Queen, of 171 tons and built in Sunderland in 1838, was on passage from Southampton to Seaham when she was caught in the storm and sought shelter at Wells. At 1:00pm, the Wells lifeboat launched to the aid of another brig, the Sharon Rose, which had run ashore on the beach at nearby Holkham. Seven sailors were rescued from the vessel and the lifeboat returned safely to Wells. However, on arrival back to the quay, the Ocean Queen was seen close to the harbour entrance, flying a distress flag.

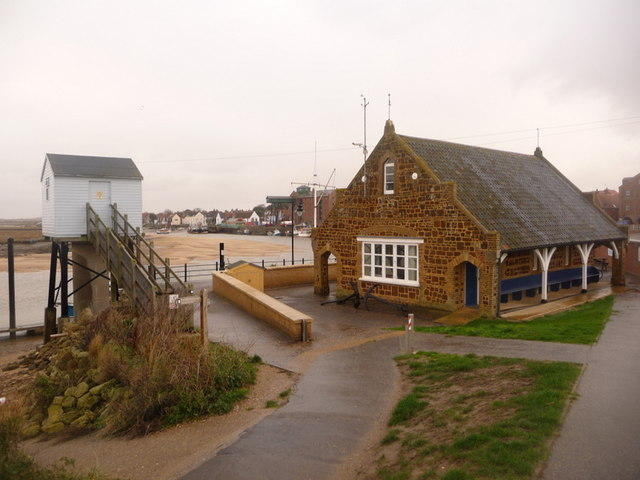
The former lifeboat station (1869) which is now used as the Harbour Masters Office and a Maritime Museum

After changing 8 of her 13 crew, the Eliza Adams was again towed to sea. By this stage the Ocean Queen had been driven ashore on the nearby sands. The lifeboat reached the brig, but was unable to help and so set sail to return to port. In so doing, a heavy wave broke over the lifeboat and it capsized.

Eleven of the 13 crew drowned, leaving 10 widows and 27 children without a father. One crew member, William Bell, managed to stay with the boat until it righted itself. Another, Thomas Kew, was washed ashore alive. A memorial to the members of the Wells lifeboat crew who lost their lives stands adjacent to the old lifeboat house. The Grade II listed building is used jointly as the Harbour Masters Office and a Maritime Museum.

The crew of the Ocean Queen remained aboard their vessel, and were able to walk ashore once the storm had abated and the tide receded.

Since 1895, the current Wells-next-the-Sea Lifeboat Station, housing both an all-weather lifeboat and an inshore rescue boat is located at the harbour entrance.
