= Tonalá River =

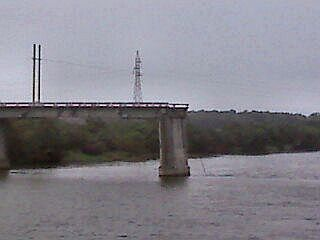
- ---[

Location
- Country: Mexico
- states: Tabasco and Veracruz

Physical characteristics
- Mouth
  - location: Gulf of Mexico

The Tonalá River is a river of Mexico. It originates in the hilly region south of Nezahualcóyotl Reservoir, near where the borders of Chiapas, Tabasco, and Veracruz meet. It flows north-northwest to empty into the Gulf of Mexico. It forms the border between Tabasco and Veracruz states for most of its length.

Juan de Grijalva's 1518 expedition named it Rio de San Antonio.

== See also ==
- List of rivers of Mexico
