= List of shipwrecks in December 1871 =

The list of shipwrecks in December 1871 includes ships sunk, foundered, grounded, or otherwise lost during December 1871.

== 1 December ==
List of shipwrecks: 1 December 1871
Ship	State	Description
Almira	United States	The 84-foot-3-inch (25.68 m), 80.35-gross register ton scow schooner set out on a voyage on Lake Michigan to pick up a cargo of wood at Clay Banks, Wisconsin, for delivery to Racine, Wisconsin, and was never heard from again. She apparently sank in a gale that struck the lake on 2 December with the loss of her entire crew of five.
Ann McRae	(Dominion of Newfoundland) Newfoundland Colony	The brigantine departed from Cork, United Kingdom for Saint John's. No further trace, presumed foundered with the loss of all hands.
Europa	United Kingdom	The steamship ran aground on the Cavava Shoal, off Argostoli, Greece. She was refloated and resumed her voyage.
Fiery Cross	United Kingdom	The smack foundered with the loss of all hands.
Glendevon	United Kingdom	The ship departed from Liverpool, Lancashire for Saint John, New Brunswick, Canada. No further trace, presumed foundered with the loss of all hands.
Honora	United Kingdom	The ship sprang a leak and was beached at Hubberston Pill, Pembrokeshire. She was on a voyage from Port Madoc, Caernarfonshire to Portsmouth, Hampshire.
James and Henry	Germany	The barque sprang a leak and sank in the North Sea 20 nautical miles (37 km) south of Great Yarmouth with the loss of one of her ten crew. Survivors were rescued by two smacks. She was on a voyage from Sunderland, County Durham, United Kingdom to Hamburg.
Louisa	United Kingdom	The brigantine foundered off Filey, Yorkshire. Her crew were rescued. She was on a voyage from Dordrecht, South Holland, Netherlands to Newcastle upon Tyne, Northumberland.
Marquis of Anglesea	United Kingdom	The ship sprang a leak and was beached at Milford Haven, Pembrokeshire. She was on a voyage from Port Madoc to Blyth, Northumberland.
Minister Thorbecke	Netherlands	The ship was driven ashore and wrecked at Grainthorpe Haven, Lincolnshire, United Kingdom. Her crew were rescued by the Grimsby Lifeboat. She was on a voyage from Rotterdam, South Holland to Hull, Yorkshire, United Kingdom.
Shamrock	United Kingdom	The schooner ran aground on the South Bull, in the Irish Sea off the coast of County Dublin. Her crew survived. She was on a voyage from Ayr to Drogheda, County Louth.
Sisters	United Kingdom	The barque was driven ashore at Venice, Italy. Her crew were rescued. She was on a voyage from Sunderland, County Durham to Venice. She was refloated anhd taken in to Venice.
Sovereign	United Kingdom	The ship was in the Atlantic Ocean off the Azores in distress. One of the two people on board was taken off, the other refused to leave.
Spring	United Kingdom	The schooner was wrecked near Cleethorpes, Lincolnshire. Her crew were rescued by the Cleethorpes Lifeboat. She was on a voyage from Sunderland to Great Yarmouth, Norfolk.

== 2 December ==
List of shipwrecks: 2 December 1871
Ship	State	Description
Albert, and Elena	United Kingdom; Spain	The tender Albert and the steamship Elena collided in the River Mersey and were both beached at Egremont, Lancashire.
Aikia	Netherlands	The ship ran aground off Wangerooge, Germany and was abandoned by her crew. She was on a voyage from an English port to Geestemünde, Germany. She subsequently floated off and drifted out to sea.
Express	United Kingdom	The steamship struck a submerged object and was beached at Girvan, Ayrshire. She was on a voyage from Girvan to Belfast, County Antrim.
Gipsy Maid	United Kingdom	The ship ran aground at Padstow, Cornwall. She was on a voyage from Antwerp, Belgium to Liverpool, Lancashire. She was refloated the next day.
Jessie	Germany	The barque collided with another vessel in the Strait of Gibraltar. She was on a voyage from Odesa, Russia to Amsterdam, North Holland, Netherlands. No further trace, presumed foundered with the loss of all hands.
Kronprinsesse Louise	Germany	The ship was driven ashore at the mouth of the Llobregat. She had become a wreck by 5 December.
Mima Thomas	United Kingdom	The steamship was abandoned in the Atlantic Ocean 700 nautical miles (1,300 km) west of the Fastnet Rock. All on board were rescued by the steamship Aleppo (United Kingdom). Mima Thomas was on a voyage from New York, United States to Liverpool.
Nora	United Kingdom	The steamship struck the breakwater at Plymouth, Devon and was beached. She was on a voyage from London to Waterford.
Norfolk Hero	United Kingdom	The fishing lugger foundered off the coast of Norfolk with the loss of all eleven hands.
Queen's Own	United Kingdom	The ship ran aground on the Jenkin Sand, in the North Sea off the coast of Suffolk. She was on a voyage from Sunderland, County Durham to Dieppe, Seine-Inférieure, France. She was refloated and taken in to Gravesend, Kent.
Sidon, and Windermere	United Kingdom	The steamship Windermere collided with the steamship Sidon and was beached at New Brighton, Cheshire. She was on a voyage from Liverpool, Lancashire to Newport, Monmouthshire. Sidon was severely damaged at the bows. She was on a voyage from Alexandria, Egypt to Liverpool. She was refloated and taken in to Liverpool.
Sokendal	Sweden	The schooner ran aground on the Cross Sand, in the North Sea off the coast of Norfolk, United Kingdom. She was on a voyage from Gothenburg to an English port. She was later refloated and beached at Great Yarmouth, Norfolk in a capsized condition.
Wentworth	United Kingdom	The barque ran aground at Brouwershaven, Zeeland, Netherlands.
William S. Tucker	United Kingdom	The ship struck a sunken wreck on the Barnard Sand, in the North Sea off the coast of Suffolk and sank. Her crew were rescued. She was on a voyage from London to South Shields, County Durham.

== 3 December ==
List of shipwrecks: 3 December 1871
Ship	State	Description
Bonita	United Kingdom	The brigantine was abandoned in the Atlantic Ocean. Her crew were rescued. She was on a voyage from Huelva, Spain to Plymouth, Devon.
Ceres	Germany	The brig was destroyed by fire in the Nickerie River.
Charlotte	United Kingdom	The brig was abandoned in the North Sea off the coast of Northumberland. Her crew survived.
Emanuele	Greece	The schooner collided with Mare (Austria-Hungary) and sank in the Danube.
Frisia	Netherlands	The schooner struck the breakwater at South Shields, County Durham, United Kingdom and sank with the loss of three of her six crew She was on a voyage from South Shields to Bremerhaven, Germany.
Irene	United Kingdom	The ship struck the Cross Sand, in the North Sea off the coast of Norfolk and sank. Her crew took to a boat, from which they were rescued by the Gorleston Lifeboat Refuge ( Royal National Lifeboat Institution). Irene was on a voyage from South Shields to Caen, Calvados, France.
M. R. G.	Canada	The schooner was wrecked on Buckle Island, Maine, United States. Her crew were rescued. She was on a voyage from Saint John, New Brunswick to Boston, Massachusetts, United States.
Princess Royal	United Kingdom	The schooner ran aground on the Scroby Sands, Norfolk. Her crew were rescued by the Gorleston Lifeboat Refuge Royal National Lifeboat Institution. Princess Royal was on a voyage from London to Aberdeen.
Richard Hill	United Kingdom	The ship ran aground on the Middle Ridge, in the Bristol Channel. She was on a voyage from Bideford, Devon to Bristol, Gloucestershire.
Temperance Star	United Kingdom	The brig was wrecked in the Sluischegat, off Vlissingen, Zeeland, Netherlands. Her crew were rescued. She was on a voyage from Ipswich, Suffolk to Antwerp.

== 4 December ==
List of shipwrecks: 4 December 1871
Ship	State	Description
Adang	Norway	The schooner ran aground on the Sjaelfande Odde and sank. Her crew were rescued.
Bandina Elizabeth	Netherlands	The ship was driven ashore at Harlingen, Friesland and capsized. She was on a voyage from Turku, Grand Duchy of Finland to Harlingen.
Esperance	Flag unknown	The schooner was driven ashore near Randers. Her crew were rescued.
Fortuna	Netherlands	The brigantine was abandoned in the Atlantic Ocean. Her crew were rescued by the brig Trio (Sweden).
George and Emily	United Kingdom	The barque was abandoned in the North Sea. Her crew were rescued. She was on a voyage from Helsingborg, Sweden to West Hartlepool, County Durham.
H. A. Brightman	United Kingdom	The steamship ran aground near Fort Harssens, North Holland, Netherlands. She was on a voyage from Hamburg, Germany to Newcastle upon Tyne, Northumberland.
Harwich	United Kingdom	The steamship ran aground on the Spijkerplaat, in the North Sea off the Dutch coast.
Hellechina Catherine	Netherlands	The schooner was abandoned in the North Sea. Her six crew were rescued by the smack Ida (United Kingdom). Hellechina Catherine was on a voyage from Fredrikshald, Norway to Emden, Germany.
Law Ogilby	United Kingdom	The brig was abandoned in the Atlantic Ocean. Her crew were rescued by Clan Alpine (United Kingdom).
Milan	United Kingdom	The steamship ran aground at Copenhagen, Denmark. She was on a voyage from Reval, Russia to Hull, Yorkshire. She was refloated on 6 December.
Triton	United Kingdom	The ship was wrecked on the Sunk Sand, in the North Sea off the coast of Essex. Her crew were rescued. She was on a voyage from Sunderland, County Durham to the Nieuwe Diep.

== 5 December ==
List of shipwrecks: 5 December 1871
Ship	State	Description
Aline	United Kingdom	The yawl foundered off Caen, Calvados, France. Her crew were rescued. She was on a voyage from London to "Casenton".
Anna and Olga	Russia	The ship was driven ashore and wrecked on Heligoland. She was on a voyage from Leith, Lothian, United Kingdom to Riga.
Aurora	United Kingdom	The steamship was driven ashore and wrecked on Læsø, Denmark. She was on a voyage from Riga, Russia to Dublin.
Catherine	Canada	The schooner foundered with the loss of all hands.
Gipsey Queen	United Kingdom	The smack collided with Secret ( (United Kingdom of Great Britain and Ireland) Guernsey) and was beached at Great Yarmouth, Norfolk. Her crew were rescued.
Henry Woolley	United Kingdom	The ship ran aground on the Nakkehoved Reefs, off the coast of Denmark. She was on a voyage from Riga to Grangemouth, Stirlingshire. She was refloated on 15 December and taken in to Helsingør, Denmark in a leaky condition.
Hillechina Catharina	Germany	The ship was driven ashore and wrecked on Texel, North Holland, Netherlands. She was on a voyage from Fredrikshald, Norway to Emden.
Indiana	United Kingdom	The ship was abandoned in the Atlantic Ocean (52°10′N 28°10′W). All nineteen people on board were rescued by the steamship City of Nankin (United Kingdom). Indiana was on a voyage from Quebec City, Canada to the Clyde.
Mary Given	Canada	The schooner was wrecked on West Cape, Prince Edward Island.
Thomas Knox	United Kingdom	The barque was wrecked on the Longsand, in the North Sea off the coast of Essex with the loss of one of her seven crew. Survivors were rescued by a smack. She was on a voyage from South Shields, County Durham to Sevastopol, Russia.

== 6 December ==
List of shipwrecks: 6 December 1871
Ship	State	Description
Avenir	France	The barque was abandoned in the Black Sea. Her crew were rescued.
Charles Bal	United Kingdom	The ship was driven ashore near Tromsø, Norway.
Claudia	United Kingdom	The ship was wrecked in the Ulna River, British Honduras.
Henriette	(Russian Empire) Grand Duchy of Finland	The ship was driven ashore on Læsø. She was on a voyage from Helsinki to Cádiz, Spain.
Jeune Amelie	France	The brig was destroyed by fire at Bahia, Brazil.
Miss Thornton	United Kingdom	The schooner was driven ashore at Dunkirk, Nord, France. She was refloated on 11 December and taken in to Dunkirk.
Orilla	United Kingdom	The ship collided with the barque Brazil (Flag unknown) and was beached near Gibraltar. She was on a voyage from Taganrog, Russia to Queenstown, County Cork. She broke up on 13 December.
Patriot	United Kingdom	The schooner was driven ashore at Breaksea Point, Glamorgan. She was on a voyage from Plymouth to Cardiff, Glamorgan.
Three Sisters	United Kingdom	The pilot boat was driven ashore at Breaksea Point.

== 7 December ==
List of shipwrecks: 7 December 1871
Ship	State	Description
Alliance	United Kingdom	The schooner was driven ashore near Blankenese, Germany. She was on a voyage from Harburg, Germany to London.
Azela	United Kingdom	The ship was abandoned off Great Yarmouth, Norfolk. Her eight crew were rescued by the Great Yarmouth Lifeboat. She was subsequently taken in to Great Yarmouth.
Donna	United Kingdom	The brig was driven ashore at Domesnes, Russia. Her crew were rescued. She was on a voyage from Riga, Russia to an English port.
Dublin	United Kingdom	The steamship was driven ashore at Winterton-on-Sea, Norfolk. She was on a voyage from Rouen, Seine-Inférieure to Newcastle upon Tyne, Northumberland. She was later refloated and taken in to Great Yarmouth.
Eliza Blake	United Kingdom	The smack was abandoned south of the Copeland Islands, County Down. She was on a voyage from Glasgow, Renfrewshire to Liverpool, Lancashire.
Emilie	United Kingdom	The ship ran aground off Jutland. She was on a voyage from Vyborg, Grand Duchy of Finland to Hartlepool, County Durham. She was refloated and put in to Mandal, Norway in a leaky condition.
Enigheden	Norway	The brig ran aground in the Elbe upstream of Glückstadt, Germany.
Friends	United Kingdom	The sloop was driven ashore at Southwold, Suffolk. Her crew were rescued. She was on a voyage from Goole, Yorkshire to Southwold. She was refloated on 10 December and taken in to Southwold.
Gratitude	United Kingdom	The ship was driven ashore at Great Yarmouth. Her crew were rescued by rocket apparatus. She was on a voyage from London to South Shields, County Durham. She was refloated on 11 December.
James	United Kingdom	The ship was driven ashore and wrecked at Berville-sur-Mer, Eure, France. Her crew were rescued. She was on a voyage from Hartlepool, County Durham to Pont-Audemer, Eure.
Kent	United Kingdom	The steamship was driven ashore at Hirtshals, Denmark. She was on a voyage from Hull, Yorkshire to Reval, Russia. She was refloated and taken in to Glückstadt, Germany.
Mary Clarke	United Kingdom	The brig collided with the steamship Marmion (United Kingdom) and sank in the North Sea 12 nautical miles (22 km) north of the Dudgeon Lightship ( Trinity House). Her crew were rescued by Marmion. Mary Clarke was on a voyage from Portsmouth, Hampshire to Sunderland.
Perseverance	United Kingdom	The schooner was driven ashore at Gorleston, Suffolk. Her crew were rescued by rocket apparatus. She was on a voyage from Woolwich, Kent to Newcastle upon Tyne.
Regina	United Kingdom	The ship ran aground on the Rhynplatte. She was on a voyage from Hamburg, Germany to Hammerfest, Norway. She was refloated and taken in to Glückstadt, where she sank.
Saida	United Kingdom	The steamship was driven ashore and wrecked 9 nautical miles (17 km) north of Rønne, Denmark. Her crew were rescued. She was on a voyage from London to Königsberg, Germany.
Samuel and Ann	United Kingdom	The schooner was driven ashore at Horsey, Norfolk. Her four crew were rescued by the Horsey Lifeboat Purser ( Royal National Lifeboat Institution).
San Nicholas	Greece	The schooner was wrecked at "Salomona". She was on a voyage from the Danube to Patras.
Unnamed	China	The junk was abandoned in the South China Sea. Her crew were rescued by the steamship Lord of the Isles (United Kingdom).

== 8 December ==
List of shipwrecks: 8 December 1871
Ship	State	Description
Albinus	United Kingdom	The ship ran aground in the River Suir. She was on a voyage from Quebec City, Canada to Waterford.
Alexander	United Kingdom	The fishing lugger was driven ashore at Kirkley, Suffolk. Her crew were rescued by rocket apparatus. She was refloated.
Auguste	Russia	The barque was driven ashore and wrecked at Nieuwesluis, Zeeland, Netherlands. Her crew were rescued.
Bill Boy	United Kingdom	The schooner was driven ashore by ice in the Elbe downstream of Cuxhaven, Germany and was severely damaged.
Brothers	United Kingdom	The collier, a brig, collided with the schooner Syren (United Kingdom) and was abandoned by her crew. They took to a boat from Syren but were subsequently reported missing. Brothers was driven ashore at Deal, Kent. She was refloated and taken in to Ramsgate, Kent for repairs.
Cattina	Italy	The brig was driven ashore and wrecked at "Vallelauro Point", Austria-Hungary. She was on a voyage from Troon, Ayrshire, United Kingdom to Trieste.
Champion	United Kingdom	The brig ran aground on the Corton Sands, in the North Sea off the coast of Suffolk. She was refloated with assistance from the Great Yarmouth Lifeboat and taken in to Great Yarmouth, Norfolk.
Ellen	(United Kingdom of Great Britain and Ireland) Guernsey	The brigantine collided with Old Goody (United Kingdom) and sank in the North Sea off Seaham, County Durham. Her crew were rescued by Old Goody. Ellen was on a voyage from the River Tyne to Jersey, Channel Islands.
Esmeralda	Norway	The barque was driven ashore on Scharhörn, Germany by ice. She was refloated and taken in to Cuxhaven.
George and Lizzy	United Kingdom	The smack collided with Secret (United Kingdom) and was run ashore at Great Yarmouth.
Harrisons	United Kingdom	The brig was abandoned in the North Sea off Cromer, Norfolk. Her crew were rescued by the cutter Seaflower ( (United Kingdom of Great Britain and Ireland) Jersey). Harrisons was on a voyage from North Shields, Northumberland to London.
Josephine	Sweden	The schooner was driven ashore and wrecked near Höganäs. Her crew were rescued.
Kangaroo	United Kingdom	The steamship ran aground at Jeddah, Hejaz Vilayet and was severely damaged. She was on a voyage from Liverpool, Lancashire to Calcutta, India. She was refloated and resumed her voyage.
Kent	United Kingdom	The ship was holed by ice in the Elbe and was beached on the Krantsand. She was later refloated.
Magnificent	United Kingdom	The ship was holed by ice at Cuxhaven.
Margaret	United Kingdom	The brig was abandoned in the North Sea. Her crew were rescued.
Marie Adele	France	The schooner ran aground. She was on a voyage from Rouen, Seine-Inférieure to Bristol, Gloucestershire, United Kingdom. She was refloated and taken in to Havre de Grâce, Seine-Inférieure in a leaky condition.
Marie Sophie	Norway	The galiot was driven ashore on Læsø, Denmark.
Musselburgh	United Kingdom	The fishing lugger was driven ashore at Kirkley. Her eleven crew were rescued by the Pakefield Lifeboat.
Nebo	United Kingdom	The ship was driven ashore near Dénia, Spain. She was on a voyage from Taganrog, Russia to a British port.
Princess Alexandra	United Kingdom	The steamship was driven ashore at Waxholme, Yorkshire.
Smith Eldridge	Canada	The schooner was wrecked at Red Cove, Newfoundland Colony. Her crew were rescued. She was on a voyage from Carbonear to Trinity Bay, Newfoundland Colony.
Svithiod	Sweden	The steamship was driven ashore on Læsø.
Teoga	Germany	The ship sank off Brunsbüttel. She was on a voyage from Callao, Peru to Cuxhaven. She was refloated in June 1872.

== 9 December ==
List of shipwrecks: 9 December 1871
Ship	State	Description
Albatross	German Empire	The schooner was driven ashore at Formby, Lancashire. She was on a voyage from Santa Anna to Liverpool, Lancashire, United Kingdom. She was refloated on 13 December and taken in to Liverpool in a waterlogged condition.
Agenoria	United Kingdom	The ship departed from Saint John's, Newfoundland Colony for Teignmouth, Devon. No further trace, presumed foundered with the loss of all hands.
Friendship	United Kingdom	The smack struck a floating object and foundered in the North Sea off the Brown Bank. Her crew were rescued by a Dutch vessel.
Kennebek	United States	The schooner ran aground at Bremen, Germany. She was on a voyage from Burntisland, Fife, United Kingdom to Bremen. She was refloated with the assistance of a tug.
May	United Kingdom	The fishing vessel was driven ashore and wrecked at Eyemouth, Berwickshire.
Superb	United Kingdom	The ship was driven ashore in the Elbe near Cuxhaven, Germany. She was on a voyage from Sunderland to Cuxhaven. She was refloated on 13 December.
Zurich	United Kingdom	The barque ran aground on the Sizewell Bank, in the North Sea off the coast of Suffolk. She was on a voyage from South Shields, County Durham to Cartagena, Spain. She was refloated and towed in to Harwich, Essex in a severely leaky condition.

== 10 December ==
List of shipwrecks: 10 December 1871
Ship	State	Description
Melancthon	United Kingdom	The ship was wrecked 8 nautical miles (15 km) south of Cape Bon, Beylik of Tunis. Her crew were rescued. She was on a voyage from Naples, Italy to Sousse, Algeria.
South Tyne	United Kingdom	The steamship ran aground on Scroby Sands, Norfolk. She was on a voyage from Newcastle upon Tyne, Northumberland to Liverpool, Lancashire. She was refloated the next day and taken in to Great Yarmouth, Norfolk.

== 11 December ==
List of shipwrecks: 11 December 1871
Ship	State	Description
Alma	United Kingdom	The ship was wrecked near Kiliya, Russia with the loss of all but one of her crew.
Crescent	United Kingdom	The ship was driven onto the Krabbenplaat, off the Dutch coast, by ice and sank.
Dashing Wave	United States	The ship ran aground in the Pearl River. She was on a voyage from Canton, China to San Francisco, California. She was refloated and taken in to Hong Kong.
Diana	United Kingdom	The brig was wrecked in the Scheldt. She was on a voyage from Sunderland, County Durham to Rotterdam, South Holland, Netherlands.
Florence	United Kingdom	The schooner sank near Rotterdam. She was on a voyage from Rotterdam to King's Lynn, Norfolk.
Jan Adrian	Denmark	The schooner was abandoned in the North Sea. Her crew were rescued. She was on a voyage from Hartlepool, County Durham, United Kingdom to Copenhagen.
Lars Johan	Sweden	The ship sank. She was on a voyage from Stockholm to Amsterdam, North Holland, Netherlands.
Star of India	United Kingdom	The ship was driven ashore by ice in the Elbe and was wrecked. She was on a voyage from Callao, Peru to Hamburg, Germany. She subsequently floated off and drove out to sea, but was later taken in to Glückstadt.
Theresa and Dora	Germany	The ship was driven ashore on Schaarhörn.
Transit	United Kingdom	The brig was holed by ice at Helsingør, Denmark.

== 12 December ==
List of shipwrecks: 12 December 1871
Ship	State	Description
Alabama	United Kingdom	The steamship ran aground at "Gatveg" or "Gotvil", Norway. She was on a voyage from Hull, Yorkshire to Vefsn, Norway. She was refloated the next day.
Aokia	Netherlands	The ship ran aground off Wangerooge, Germany and was abandoned. She was on a voyage from an English port to Geestemünde, Germany. She floated off and drifted out to sea.
Apollo	United Kingdom	The steamship was driven ashore at Breaksea Point, Glamorgan. She was refloated the next day and taken in to Bristol, Gloucestershire.
Black Diamond	United Kingdom	The steamship ran aground in the River Wear and broke in two. Subsequently repaired and returned to service.
Fürst Blücher	Germany	The brig foundered in the Baltic Sea off Wismar. She was on a voyage from Hartlepool, County Durham, United Kingdom to Wismar.
Helen Drummond	United Kingdom	The barque ran aground at the mouth of the Canímar River. She was on a voyage from Newport, Monmouthshire to Matanzas, Cuba. She was refloated the next day and taken in to Matanzas.
Parket	United Kingdom	The sloop was driven onto the Rulgenplaat, off the coast of South Holland, Netherlands, by ice. She was refloated with assistance.
Polynia	Norway	The brig was driven ashore on "Geveskar", Sweden. She was on a voyage from Tromsø to Gothenburg, Sweden. She was later refloated and taken in to Gothenburg.
Vienna	United Kingdom	The brig was run into by a schooner off the Dudgeon Sandbank and was abandoned. Her crew were rescued by the smack Favourite (United Kingdom). Vienna was on a voyage from Hartlepool, County Durham to Dover, Kent.
Violette	France	The schooner was driven ashore at Flamborough Head, Yorkshire, United Kingdom. She was on a voyage from Antwerp, Belgium to Sunderland, County Durham. She was refloated and resumed her voyage.

== 13 December ==
List of shipwrecks: 13 December 1871
Ship	State	Description
Aracaty	United Kingdom	The brig was wrecked near Larvik, Norway. Her crew were rescued.
Capella	United Kingdom	The ship was damaged by fire at Gravesend, Kent.
Caroline	United Kingdom	The brig ran aground on the Haaks Bank, in the North Sea off the Dutch coast and was wrecked. Her crew were rescued. She was on a voyage from Sunderland, County Durham to the Nieuwe Diep.
Ebenezer	(Dominion of Newfoundland) Newfoundland Colony	The schooner was wrecked in Conception Bay. Her crew were rescued. She was on a voyage from Saint John's to Twillingate.
Elise Johanna	Germany	The barque was driven ashore in the Oostgat. She was on a voyage from Sunderland to Hamburg. She had been refloated by 14 December.
Genoline	Russia	The barque was wrecked on the Goodwin Sands, Kent, United Kingdom with the loss of five of her eleven crew. Survivors were rescued by the Deal and Ramsgate Lifeboats.
Herman	United Kingdom	The ship was wrecked near Agger, Denmark. Her crew were rescued. She was on a voyage from Newcastle upon Tyne, Northumberland to Vyborg, Grand Duchy of Finland.
RMS Macgregor Laird	United Kingdom	The steamship was wrecked on an uncharted rock off Corisco, Spanish Guinea. All on board were rescued. The survivors were attacked by the local inhabitants, who plundered the wreck. She was on a voyage from Liverpool, Lancashire to the west coast of Africa.
Mathilde	France	The steamship ran aground at "Cape Blanchey". She was refloated with assistance from the steamship Bertha (United Kingdom) and towed in to Dunkirk, Nord, where she sank.
Nautilus	United Kingdom	The ship was damaged by fire at Gravesend.
Normandie	France	The steamship was driven ashore at Audresselles, Pas-de-Calais. She was on a voyage from Havre de Grâce, Seine-Inférieure to Dunkirk.
Umgeni	United Kingdom	The ship ran aground in the Colony of Natal. She was on a voyage from a port in the colony to London.

== 14 December ==
List of shipwrecks: 14 December 1871
Ship	State	Description
Aaltje Matthius	Netherlands	The schooner foundered 60 nautical miles (110 km) north east of Cape St. Vincent, Portugal. Her crew were rescued by the brig Victoria (Germany).
Abyssinian	United Kingdom	The ship ran aground on the Goodwin Sands, Kent. She was refloated.
Alexandre	Russia	The schooner was wrecked at "Eplamudes", Ottoman Empire. Her crew were rescued.
Amanda	United Kingdom	The ship was driven ashore at Torekov, Sweden. She was on a voyage from Hull, Yorkshire to Malmö, Sweden.
Gazelle	United Kingdom	The steamship ran aground on the West Knock Sand, in the Thames Estuary. She was on a voyage from London to West Hartlepool, County Durham. She was refloated with assistance and resumed her voyage.
Glendower	United Kingdom	The ship was driven ashore and wrecked near Ceuta, Spain with the loss of one of her eleven crew. She was on a voyage from Sunderland, County Durham to Barcelona, Spain.
Irwell	United Kingdom	The steamship was driven ashore at Gilleleje, Denmark. She was on a voyage from Hull, Yorkshire to Danzig, Germany. She was refloated on 30 December and taken in to Helsingør, Denmark.
Midge	New Zealand	The 92-ton schooner was wrecked while trying to enter Kaipara Harbour, New Zealand.
Rosanna	United Kingdom	The ship foundered 10 nautical miles (19 km) north west of Bonaire, Leeward Islands. Her crew were rescued. She was on a voyage from Saint Kitts to Maracaibo, Venezuela.

== 15 December ==
List of shipwrecks: 15 December 1871
Ship	State	Description
Alfredo el Grande	United Kingdom	The steamship was wrecked at Lemvig, Denmark with the loss of nine lives. She was on a voyage from Newcastle upon Tyne, Northumberland to Copenhagen, Denmark.
Costa Rica	France	The barque ran into Windsor Castle (United Kingdom) and sank in the English Channel 25 nautical miles (46 km) south west of St. Catherine's Lighthouse, Isle of Wight, United Kingdom with the loss of seventeen of the 35 people on board. Survivors were rescued by the brig Express (United Kingdom). Costa Rica was on a voyage from Havre de Grâce, Seine-Inférieure to Buenos Aires, Argentina.
Dagmar	United Kingdom	The smack was severely damaged by fire at Great Yarmouth, Norfolk.
Danube	United Kingdom	The steamship was damaged by an onboard explosion at Southampton, Hampshire.
Erasmus	Netherlands	The full-rigged ship ran aground on the Cromer Rocks, Norfolk. She was on a voyage from Sunderland, County Durham, United Kingdom to Batavia, Netherlands East Indies. She was refloated with assistance and towed in to Great Yarmouth.
Jane Whiteley	United Kingdom	The ship struck the Goole Bridge and sank with the loss of three lives. She was on a voyage from Goole, Yorkshire to Doncaster, Yorkshire.
Norham	United Kingdom	The steamship collided with the barque Neptune (United Kingdom) and sank 50 nautical miles (93 km) south east of Gibraltar. Her crew were rescued by Neptune. Norham was on a voyage from South Shields, County Durham to Barcelona, Spain.
Paul and Marie	United Kingdom	The ship was driven ashore at Hornbæk, Denmark. She was on a voyage from Grangemouth, Stirlingshire to Wismar, Germany. She was refloated and taken in to Helsingør, Denmark.
Wangerland	Germany	The barque ran aground on the Goodwin Sands, Kent, United Kingdom. She was refloated with assistance from the lugger Buffalo Gal (United Kingdom) and towed in to Ramsgate, Kent by the tug Restless (United Kingdom).
Wendola	Germany	The brig was driven ashore on Læsø, Denmark. She was on a voyage from Newcastle upon Tyne to Lübeck. She was refloated and assisted in to Fredrikshavn, Denmark.

== 16 December ==
List of shipwrecks: 16 December 1871
Ship	State	Description
Ada	United Kingdom	The ship ran aground in the Danube at Gorgova, Ottoman Empire.
Albert	Germany	The barque was wrecked on the Goodwin Sands, Kent, United Kingdom. Her sixteen crew were rescued by the North Deal Lifeboat. She was on a voyage from Bremen to the East Indies.
Asterate	United Kingdom	The ship was driven ashore at Ventava, Courland Governorate.
Caroline	Sweden	The schooner was driven ashore by ice at Nyköping.
Delos	United Kingdom	The steamship was driven ashore at Flamborough Head, Yorkshire. She was on a voyage from South Shields, County Durham to Odesa, Russia. She was refloated and beached at Grimsby, Lincolnshire.
Forster	(Russian Empire) Grand Duchy of Finland	The ship was wrecked on Anholt, Denmark.
Fury	United Kingdom	The schooner collided with the steamship Hendraft (Netherlands) and sank at Middelburg, Zeeland, Netherlands. She was on a voyage from South Shields to Middelburg. She was refloated on 18 December and taken in to Middelburg for repairs.
General Dübeln	Flag unknown	The barque was driven ashore by ice near "Udbyhoi", Norway.
Georg	Russia	The barque was wrecked on Rügen, Germany. She was on a voyage from Riga to Swinemünde, Germany.
Henriette	Flag unknown	The ship was driven ashore by ice near "Udbyhoi".
Hesperus	Flag unknown	The yacht was driven ashore by ice near "Udbyhoi".
India	United Kingdom	The barque was wrecked on the Goodwin Sands. Her sixteen crew were rescued by the Ramsgate Lifeboat Bradford ( Royal National Lifeboat Institution). India was on a voyage from Quebec City, Canada to South Shields.
Johanne	Flag unknown	The ship was driven ashore by ice near "Udbyhoi".
Lastederagen	Flag unknown	The sloop was driven ashore by ice near "Udbyhoi".
Louis XIV	France	The ship departed from Swansea, Glamorgan, United Kingdom for Lisbon, Portugal. No further trace, presumed foundered with the loss of all hands.
Medora	(Dominion of Newfoundland) Newfoundland Colony	The ship departed from Liverpool, Lancashire, United Kingdom for Harbour Grace. No further trace, presumed foundered with the loss of all hands.
Minerva	Flag unknown	The galliot was driven ashore by ice near "Udbyhoi".
Nicholine	Flag unknown	The ship was driven ashore by ice near "Udbyhoi".
Peppino B.	Austria-Hungary	The brig ran aground on the Cross Sand, in the North Sea off the coast of Norfolk, United Kingdom. She was on a voyage from Sunderland, County Durham, United Kingdom to Trieste. She was refloated with assistance and taken in to Great Yarmouth, Norfolk for repairs.
Petrea	Flag unknown	The yacht was driven ashore by ice near "Udbyhoi".
Rainbow	(Dominion of Newfoundland) Newfoundland Colony	The ship was wrecked in Ronne Bay. She was on a voyage from Saint John's to Ronne Bay.
Thermutis	United Kingdom	The ship ran aground on the Blackwater Bank, in the Irish Sea off the coast of County Wexford and sank with the loss of one of her eleven crew. She was on a voyage from Liverpool to Bilbao, Spain.
Unnamed	Germany	The steamship ran aground on the Goodwin Sands. She was refloated and resumed her voyage.
Unnamed	United Kingdom	The Deal boat foundered whilst her crew were assisting India (United Kingdom). Her five crew were rescued by the North Deal Lifeboat.

== 17 December ==
List of shipwrecks: 17 December 1871
Ship	State	Description
Albert	Germany	The barque was wrecked on the Goodwin Sands. Her crew were rescued. She was on a voyage from Bremen to Rangoon, Burma.
Dawn	United Kingdom	The schooner was driven ashore at Flamborough Head, Yorkshire. She was on a voyage from Hull, Yorkshire to Newcastle upon Tyne, Northumberland. She was refloated on 19 December and taken in to Scarborough, Yorkshire.
Esk	United Kingdom	The brig struck the South Rock, off Sunderland, County Durham and sank. Her crew were rescued by a tug. She was on a voyage from London to Sunderland.
Excel	United Kingdom	The schooner departed from Twillingate, Newfoundland Colony for Poole, Dorset. No further trace, presumed foundered with the loss of all hands.
Hermanus Theodorus	Netherlands	The ship was driven ashore in the Blaauwe Slenk. She was on a voyage from Newcastle upon Tyne to Harlingen, Friesland. She was refloated with assistance from lighters and a tug.
Iduna	United Kingdom	The steamship sprang a leak and sank at South Shields, County Durham.
Little Mountain	United Kingdom	The steamship was driven ashore at Cranfield Point, County Down. She was on a voyage from Ayr to Dublin. She was consequently condemned.
Mary	United Kingdom	The ship was wrecked near Cape Bon, Algeria. Her crew were rescued. She was on a voyage from Sulina, Ottoman Empire to a British port.
Princess Victoria	United Kingdom	The ship was driven ashore at Flamborough Head. She was on a voyage from Harwich, Essex to Sunderland.
Zuma	United Kingdom	The brigantine was run down and sunk off Scarborough, Yorkshire by the schooner Arabian (United Kingdom) . Her crew were rescued by Arabian. Zuma was on a voyage from South Shields to Dover, Kent.

== 18 December ==
List of shipwrecks: 18 December 1871
Ship	State	Description
Ada	United Kingdom	The brig was driven ashore at Maryport, Cumberland. Her crew were rescued by rocket apparatus. She was on a voyage from Dublin to Whitehaven, Cumberland.
Blaina	United Kingdom	The ship sank in the River Severn. She was on a voyage from Chepstow, Monmouthshire to Bristol, Gloucestershire.
Catina	Greece	The brig was wrecked at Heraklion, Crete.
Friends	United Kingdom	The ship was beached at Skinburness, Cumberland. She was on a voyage from Annan, Dumfriesshire to Liverpool, Lancashire.
Indian	United Kingdom	The barque was wrecked on the Goodwin Sands, Kent. Her crew were rescued. She was on a voyage from South Shields, County Durham to Quebec City, Canada.
Maria	Germany	The ship was run ashore near "Brickhaven", United Kingdom. She was on a voyage from Antwerp, Belgium to Burntisland, Fife, United Kingdom.
Prins Friedrich Carl	Germany	The brig ran aground on the Kullen. Her crew were rescued. She was on a voyage from Newcastle upon Tyne, Northumberland, United Kingdom to Swinemünde. She was later refloated but consequently sank.
Queen	United Kingdom	The sloop was wrecked in Morecambe Bay. She was on a voyage from Beaumaris, Anglesey to Preston, Lancashire.
Robina	United Kingdom	The barque was driven ashore at Rye, Sussex. Her seventeen crew were rescued by the Rye and Winchelsea RNLI lifeboats. She was on a voyage from Águilas, Spain to South Shields. Robina was refloated on 27 February 1872.
Seaton	United Kingdom	The brig foundered off Cape La Hougue, Manche, France. Five of her seven crew were rescued by Prima Donna (United Kingdom). Two were reported missing. Seaton was on a voyage from Guernsey, Channel Islands to London.
Thomas Adams	United Kingdom	The steamship ran aground on the Goodwin Sands. She was on a voyage from South Shieldsto Lisbon, Portugal. She was refloated and taken in to Harwich, Essex.
Wanderer	United Kingdom	The ship was driven ashore at Maryport Her ten crew were rescued by the Maryport Lifeboat. She was on a voyage from Maryport to London. She was refloated on 27 December.

== 19 December ==
List of shipwrecks: 19 December 1871
Ship	State	Description
Edward, or Elizabeth	United Kingdom	The schooner foundered in the English Channel 15 nautical miles (28 km) south south west of Cap la Heve, Manche, France with the loss of all hands.
John Mitchell	United Kingdom	The schooner was wrecked in Nova Scotia. Her crew were rescued.
Magdeburg	United Kingdom	The steamship ran aground on Scroby Sands, Norfolk. She was on a voyage from South Shields, County Durham to Havre de Grâce, Seine-Inférieure, France. She was refloated with the assistance of a steamship.
Sea Queen	United Kingdom	The ship departed from Queenstown, County Cork for Limerick. No further trace, presumed foundered with the loss of all hands.
Seaton	United Kingdom	The brig foundered in the English Channel off Cap La Hougue, Manche, France. Her crew were rescued by the schooner Prima Donna (United Kingdom). Seaton was on a voyage from Guernsey, Channel Islands to London.
Thistle	United Kingdom	The ship ran aground on the Owers Sandbank, in the English Channel off the coast of Sussex. She was on a voyage from Middlesbrough, Yorkshire to Swansea, Glamorgan. She was refloated and taken in to Shoreham-by-Sea, Sussex in a leaky condition.

== 20 December ==
List of shipwrecks: 20 December 1871
Ship	State	Description
Delaware	United Kingdom	The steamship foundered off Samson, Isles of Scilly with the loss of all but two of her 49 crew. She was on a voyage from Liverpool, Lancashire to Calcutta, British Raj.
Eliza	United Kingdom	The schooner was partly abandoned off "Fort Crayon". Three crew were taken off by the Margate Lifeboat. She was taken in to Margate, Kent the next day.
Grace	United Kingdom	The ship was driven ashore and wrecked at Swansea, Glamorgan. Her crew were rescued.
Medina	United Kingdom	The ship ran aground at Alvarado, Mexico. She was on a voyage from Alvarado to Veracruz. She was refloated and completed her voyage in a leaky condition.
R. B.	France	The schooner was abandoned off Clovelly, Devon, United Kingdom. Her seven crew were rescued by the Clovelly Lifeboat Alexander and Matilda Boetefaur ( Royal National Lifeboat Institution).

== 21 December ==
List of shipwrecks: 21 December 1871
Ship	State	Description
Antigua Planter	United Kingdom	The ship foundered. Her crew were rescued by Stratton ( (United Kingdom of Great Britain and Ireland) ). Antigua Planter was on a voyage from Teignmouth, Devon to Leith, Lothian.
Baltic	United Kingdom	The barque was driven ashore near Lohme, Germany. She was on a voyage from Newcastle upon Tyne, Northumberland to Swinemünde, Germany. She was refloated and taken in to Swinemünde.
Brothers	United Kingdom	The schooner was driven ashore and wrecked at Bideford, Devon with the loss of all hands.
Calamidas	Greece	The brig was abandoned at Newquay, Cornwall, United Kingdom. Her eleven crew were rescued by the Newquay Lifeboat. She was on a voyage from Taganrog, Russia to Falmouth, Cornwall.
Courier	United Kingdom	The ship was driven ashore on Jasmund, Germany. She was on a voyage from Hartlepool, County Durham to Swinemünde. She was refloated and taken in to Swinemünde.
Deborah Pennell	United States	The ship ran aground on the Banjaard Sand, in the North Sea off the Dutch coast. She was on a voyage from Baltimore, Maryland to Rotterdam, South Holland, Netherlands. She sank the next day.
Eliza Ann	United Kingdom	The schooner was driven ashore at Margate, Kent. She was on a voyage from Bruges, West Flanders, Belgium to Bristol, Gloucestershire. She was refloated.
Johnston Jones	United Kingdom	The ship foundered in the English Channel off the coast of Pas-de-Calais, France. Crew presumed drowned.
Louisa	United Kingdom	The brig was abandoned in a sinking condition. Her eight crew were rescued by the barque Lorena (United States).
Louise	France	The ship was driven ashore at Koserow, Germany. She was on a voyage from Rouen, Seine-Inférieure to Swinemünde. She was refloated and taken in to Swinemünde in a leaky condition.
Mary Andrews	United Kingdom	The schooner collided with the brig Torrens (United Kingdom) and was abandoned in the Irish Sea. Her crew were rescued by Torrens. Mary Andrews was on a voyage from Glasgow, Renfrewshire to Dublin.
Queen	United Kingdom	The schooner was wrecked at Morecambe, Lancashire. She was on a voyage from Beaumaris, Anglesey to Preston, Lancashire.
Thomas and Elizabeth	United Kingdom	The ship was driven ashore at Margate. She was on a voyage from London to Waterford. She was refloated.
Westmorland	United Kingdom	The schooner ran aground at Altona, Germany. She was on a voyage from Liverpool, Lancashire to Hamburg, Germany.
Zuma	(United Kingdom of Great Britain and Ireland) Guernsey	The brig was wrecked at Hartland Quay, Devon with the loss of three of her crew. She was on a voyage from Bilbao, Spain to Swansea, Glamorgan.

== 22 December ==
List of shipwrecks: 22 December 1871
Ship	State	Description
Adelina	United Kingdom	The steamship sprang a leak and sank at Maryport, Cumberland. She was refloated on 25 December.
Arva	United Kingdom	The schooner was driven ashore at Leven, Fife. She was on a voyage from Aberdeen to Methil, Fife.
Aspatria	United Kingdom	The ship was driven ashore at Portrush, County Antrim. She was on a voyage from Troon, Ayrshire to Portrush. She was refloated and found to be severely leaky.
Dana	Denmark	The ship ran aground off Ellekilde, Zealand. She was on a voyage from Hartlepool, County Durham, United Kingdom to Copenhagen.
Edwin	United Kingdom	The brig put in to Waterford on fire and was scuttled. She was on a voyage from Garrucha, Spain to Glasgow, Renfrewshire. She was severely damaged.
Illyrian	United Kingdom	The steamship was damaged by fire at Alexandria, Egypt.
John and James	United Kingdom	The ship was wrecked near Berck, Pas-de-Calais, France with the loss of all hands.
Meg Lee	United Kingdom	The brig collided with a smack and sank in the North Sea. Her crew were rescued.
Psyche	United Kingdom	The barque caught fire at Penarth, Glamorgan and was scuttled.
Rose	United Kingdom	The ship ran aground on the Whiting Sand, in the North Sea off the coast of Suffolk. She was on a voyage from South Shields, County Durham to Ipswich, Suffolk. She was refloated and taken in to Harwich, Essex in a leaky condition.
Sieuvert and Johan	Netherlands	The ship foundered in the North Sea 12 nautical miles (22 km) off Whitby, Yorkshire, United Kingdom. Her crew were rescued by Helen (United Kingdom). Sieuvert and Johan was on a voyage from Newcastle upon Tyne, Northumberland, United Kingdom to Groningen.
William and Mary	United Kingdom	The ship was driven ashore at Dundrum, County Down. She was on a voyage from Dundrum to Liverpool. She was refloated on 26 December and taken in to Dundrum.
Zuma	Russia	The steamship foundered in the Caspian Sea with the loss of all on board.

== 23 December ==
List of shipwrecks: 23 December 1871
Ship	State	Description
Citadel	United Kingdom	The schooner ran aground on the Shipwash Sand, in the North Sea off the coast of Suffolk. She was on a voyage from Newcastle upon Tyne, Northumberland to Philadelphia, Pennsylvania, United States. She was refloated and taken in to Dover, Kent in a leaky condition.
Elizabeth	United Kingdom	The ship was driven ashore and sank at Souter Point, County Durham. Her crew were rescued.
Elizabeth	United Kingdom	The ship ran aground on the Ortez Bank, in the River Plate and was abandoned by her crew. She was on a voyage from Zárate, Argentina to Liverpool, Lancashire.
Empress	United Kingdom	The tug was driven ashore at Souter Point. Her crew were rescued.
Europa	United Kingdom	The ship was abandoned in the Atlantic Ocean. Her crew were rescued by Danish Princess (United Kingdom). Europa was on a voyage from Glasgow, Renfrewshire to New York, United States.

== 24 December ==
List of shipwrecks: 24 December 1871
Ship	State	Description
Goliath	Germany	The tug was in collision with the steamship Uhlenhorst (Germany and sank in the Weser. Her crew were rescued.

== 25 December ==
List of shipwrecks: 25 December 1871
Ship	State	Description
America	Italy	The steamship was destroyed by fire in the River Plate with the loss of 87 of the 214 people on board. She was on a voyage from Buenos Aires, Argentina to Montevideo, Uruguay.
Elizabeth	United Kingdom	The brig was driven ashore at Whitburn, County Durham.
Urbino	United Kingdom	The steamship was driven ashore at Ingoldmells, Lincolnshire. She was on a voyage from Alexandria, Egypt to Hull, Yorkshire. She was refloated and completed her voyage.

== 26 December ==
List of shipwrecks: 26 December 1871
Ship	State	Description
Deborah	United Kingdom	The schooner was driven ashore at Flamborough Head, Yorkshire She was on a voyage from Mistley, Essex to Newcastle upon Tyne. She was refloated and taken in tow for Newcastle upon Tyne.

== 27 December ==
List of shipwrecks: 27 December 1871
Ship	State	Description
Blue Nose	United States	The ship was driven ashore and wrecked near Hellevoetsluis, Zeeland, Netherlands. She was on a voyage from New York to Rotterdam, South Holland, Netherlands.
Cuba	United Kingdom	The steamship ran aground on the South West Spit. She was on a voyage from New York, United States to Liverpool, Lancashire. She was refloated and resumed her voyage.
Due Checchi	Italy	The barque ran aground on the Corton Sand, in the North Sea off the coast of Suffolk, United Kingdom. She was on a voyage from Sulina, Ottoman Empire to Leith, Lothian, United Kingdom. She was refloated and taken in to Great Yarmouth, Norfolk, United Kingdom in a leaky condition.
Lizzie	United Kingdom	The ship was driven ashore on the Isle of Whithorn, Wigtownshire. Her crew were rescued.
Madras	Germany	The barque was wrecked on the west coast of Skagen, Denmark. She was on a voyage from Hull, Yorkshire, United Kingdom to Rügenwalde.
Marcus	United Kingdom	The steamship ran aground on the Jenkin Sand, in the North Sea off the coast of Suffolk. She was on a voyage from Riga in the Russian Empire to London. She was refloated with assistance from a tug.
Mary Nickson	United Kingdom	The ship was wrecked at Rhoscolyn, Anglesey. Her crew were rescued. She was on a voyage from Huelva, Spain to Liverpool, Lancashire.
Retreiver	United Kingdom	The barque ran aground and sank at Sunderland, County Durham. She was on a voyage from Pensacola, Florida, United States to Sunderland. She was wrecked in a gale on 29 December.
Revere	(United Kingdom of Great Britain and Ireland) Jersey	The ship was driven ashore at Low Hauxley, Northumberland. She was on a voyage from London to Montrose, Forfarshire. She was refloated and taken in to Amble, Northumberland.
Superbe	Germany	The schooner was wrecked in "Skaptafells Lyssier", Iceland.

== 28 December ==
List of shipwrecks: 28 December 1871
Ship	State	Description
Giovanni Moglia	Italy	The ship ran aground at Hull, Yorkshire, United Kingdom. She was on a voyage from Taganrog, Russia to Hull. She was refloated and found to be leaky.
Hebe	Netherlands	The brig ran aground on the Paardeplaat. She was on a voyage from Batavia, Netherlands East Indies to Rotterdam, South Holland. She was refloated the next day.
J. L. Pye	Canada	The brigantine was destroyed by fire off Southend, Essex, United Kingdom. She was on a voyage from Wilmington, Delaware, United States to London, United Kingdom.
Racer	United Kingdom	The ship was wrecked at Mogadore, Morocco. She was on a voyage from Safi, Morocco to Queenstown, County Cork.
W. H. Bigelow	United Kingdom	The ship was wrecked on the Bahama Banks. Her crew survived. She was on a voyage from the Clyde to Matanzas, Cuba.

== 29 December ==
List of shipwrecks: 29 December 1871
Ship	State	Description
Billow	United Kingdom	The schooner sank at Belfast, County Antrim. Her crew survived. She was on a voyage from Maryport, Cumberland to Belfast.
Corsair	United Kingdom	The steam dandy ran aground and sank in the River Tees. She was on a voyage from Newcastle upon Tyne, Northumberland to Middlesbrough, Yorkshire.
Hannah	United Kingdom	The steam wherry foundered off Sunderland, County Durham. She was on a voyage from the River Tyne to Hartlepool, County Durham.
Louise	Denmark	The ship was wrecked on Anholt. She was on a voyage from Charleston, South Carolina, United States to Copenhagen.
Yarrow	United Kingdom	The steamship ran aground at Grangemouth, Stirlingshire. She was on a voyage from Grangemouth to Dunkirk, Nord, France. She was refloated and resumed her voyage.

== 30 December ==
List of shipwrecks: 30 December 1871
Ship	State	Description
Champion Trawler	United Kingdom	The trawler was run into and then ran aground at Lowestoft, Suffolk and was wrecked.
Claudia	United Kingdom	The brig foundered in Liverpool Bay off the Formby Lightship ( Trinity House). Her crew were rescued. She was on a voyage from Garton, Lancashire to Dublin.
Iside	Italy	The brig was driven ashore at Towyn, Merionethshire, United Kingdom. She was on a voyage from Livorno to the Clyde.
Nordcap	Norway	The barque ran aground on the Brake Sand. She was on a voyage from London, United Kingdom to Pensacola, Florida, United States. She was refloated and taken in to The Downs.
Prince Consort	United Kingdom	The steamship struck a submerged object and sank at Southsea, Hampshire. All on board, her crew and 60 passengers, were rescued. She was on a voyage from Southsea to Ryde, Isle of Wight.
Progress	United Kingdom	The ship was driven ashore at Falsterbo, Sweden. She was on a voyage from Danzig, Germany to Newcastle upon Tyne, Northumberland. She was refloated and put in to Malmö, Sweden.

== 31 December ==
List of shipwrecks: 31 December 1871
Ship	State	Description
Alexander Tod	United Kingdom	The steamship departed from Rostock, Germany for Leith, Lothian. No further trace, presumed foundered with the loss of all hands, eighteen or nineteen lives.
Hans	Germany	The ship was driven ashore and wrecked on Bornholm, Denmark. She was on a voyage from Danzig to a South American port.
Hibernia	United Kingdom	The schooner was driven ashore at Queenstown, County Cork.
Sussex	United Kingdom	The ship was wrecked at Barwan Head, Ceylon. Five of her crew were reported missing.
Sussex	United Kingdom	The ship was wrecked at Port Phillip Heads, Victoria with the loss of eight of her crew.
Volunteer	United Kingdom	The brigantine ran aground at the Mumbles, Glamorgan. She was on a voyage from Swansea, Glamorgan to Bilbao, Spain. She was refloated on 4 January 1872 and towed in to Swansea.
Wentworth	United Kingdom	The steamship ran aground on the Gunfleet Sand, in the North Sea off the coast of Essex. She was refloated and resumed her voyage.

== Unknown date ==
List of shipwrecks: Unknown date in December 1871
Ship	State	Description
Aaltje Maathuis	Netherlands	The ship was abandoned at sea. Her crew were rescued. She was on a voyage from Newcastle upon Tyne, Northumberland, United Kingdom to Livorno, Italy.
Adriano	Italy	The ship was wrecked at Midia, Ottoman Empire with the loss of all hands.
Alarm	United Kingdom	The ship caught fire and was beached near Landerneau, Finistère. She was on a voyage from London to Landerneau. She was refloated on 11 December.
Albatross	United Kingdom	The ship was abandoned at sea. She was on a voyage from Barbados to Great Yarmouth, Norfolk.
Alexandria	United Kingdom	The steamship ran aground at Lido di Venezia, Italy. She was later refloated and taken in to Venice.
Alfareta	United Kingdom	The ship was driven ashore and sank in Hell Gate, New Brunswick, Canada.
Alma	United Kingdom	The ship was driven ashore at "Stanne". She was on a voyage from Montreal, Quebec, Canada to Montevideo, Uruguay. She was subsequently abandoned by her crew.
Amber Nymph	United Kingdom	The brig was abandoned in the Atlantic Ocean. She was on a voyage from Trinidad to a British port. She was discovered derelict on 10 February 1872 by Assam Valley (United Kingdom), which put five crew aboard. They took her in to Queenstown, County Cork.
Andriano	Greece	The brig was wrecked in the Black Sea.
Anexarlitos	Greece	The brig was driven ashore at Yeni-Kale, Ottoman Empire before 23 December.
Angelica	Greece	The brig was holed by ice near Galaţi, Ottoman Empire.
Angheliki	Greece	The brig was holed by ice and sank at Brăila, Ottoman Empire.
Anglo-Saxon	United States	The barque foundered off Cape St. Mary's, Newfoundland Colony. She was on a voyage from Sunderland, County Durham, United Kingdom to California.
Anna	Germany	The ship was wrecked at the Kullen Lighthouse, Sweden. Her crew were rescued. She was on a voyage from West Hartlepool, County Durham to Stettin
Annessione Franchisco	Spain	The ship was driven ashore in the Rhône.
Apollo	Denmark	The ship was driven ashore and sank at "Oerhagen".
Astarte	United Kingdom	The steamship was driven ashore north of Ventava, Courland Governorate. She was on a voyage from Reval, Russia to Hull. She was refloated and beached.
Aunt Nellie	United Kingdom	The ship ran aground on the English Bank, in the River Plate before 11 November. She was on a voyage from Newport, Monmouthshire to Buenos Aires, Argentina.
Aurelie	United Kingdom	The barque ran aground on the St. Thomas's Shoals and was abandoned before 8 December. She was on a voyage from Quebec City, Canada to Newcastle upon Tyne.
Australië	Netherlands	The barque ran aground on the Haaks Bank, in the North Sea off the Dutch coast. She was on a voyage from Batavia, Netherlands East Indies to Amsterdam, North Holland. She was refloated and taken in to the Nieuwe Diep in a sinking condition.
Banda	United Kingdom	The steamship was driven ashore on Balabac Island, Spanish East Indies. She was on a voyage from Yloilo, Spanish East Indies to the English Channel. She was refloated on 13 December.
Beamish	United Kingdom	The ship was wrecked on "Devis Island".
Beethoven	Flag unknown	The steamship ran aground in the Danube at Gorgova, Ottoman Empire.
Bertram Rigby	United Kingdom	The ship put in to São Vicente Island, Cape Verde Islands on fire before 12 December. She was on a voyage from Calcutta, India to London.
Black Duck	United Kingdom	The ship was wrecked on Cape Sable Island, Nova Scotia, Canada.
Bolke	Germany	The brigantine ran aground at St. Jago de Cuba, Cuba. She was refloated with the assistance of a Spanish steamship and resumed her voyage.
Bosphorus	United Kingdom	The steamship was lost. She was on a voyage from Liverpool, Lancashire to Trieste.
Bravo	Germany	The ship was driven ashore by ice near "Schwankentieim".
Brazilia	United Kingdom	The ship ran aground on the West Knock Sand, in the Thames Estuary off Southend, Essex. She was on a voyage from Riga, Russa to London. She was refloated and resumed her voyage.
Castor	Netherlands	The steamship was driven ashore near Cape Solanto, Sicily, Italy. She was refloated.
Caterina	Italy	The barque was driven ashore at Twielenfleth, Germany.
Caterina	Italy	The brig was wrecked at "Agateli".
Cathcart	United Kingdom	The ship was driven ashore in the Hooghly River between the Black Pagoda and the Piggermouth Pagoda. She was on a voyage from London to Calcutta. She had been refloated by 9 January 1872.
Catherine	United States	The ship was wrecked. She was on a voyage from Boston, Massachusetts to Yarmouth, Maine.
Ceres	United Kingdom	The brig ran aground on the Shipwash Sand, in the North Sea off the coast of Suffolk. She was refloated with the assistance of Reaper and Wonder (both United Kingdom) and taken in to Harwich, Essex.
Chattanooga	United States	The decommissioned screw frigate was sunk by drifting ice at her moorings at League Island in Philadelphia, Pennsylvania. Her wreck was sold in January 1872.
C. L. Bahr	Germany	The ship ran aground off Skagen, Denmark. She was on a voyage from London to Danzig. She subsequently broke up.
Clifford	United Kingdom	The ship was lost off Cape Horn, Chile. She was on a voyage from London to San Francisco, California.
Comet	Germany	The ship was wrecked on Anholt. She was on a voyage from Grangemouth, Stirlingshire, United Kingdom to Rostock.
Corsica	United Kingdom	The ship was driven ashore by ice at Quebec City.
Conder	United Kingdom	The ship was wrecked. She was on a voyage from Madras to Cocanada, India.
Counsellor	United Kingdom	The ship was driven ashore in the Danube.
Crown	United Kingdom	The brig was wrecked in the Torres Strait.
C. W. Couran	Canada	The ship was driven ashore and wrecked at Saint-Pierre. Her crew were rescued. She was on a voyage from Halifax, Nova Scotia to Saint Pierre.
Danish Princess	United Kingdom	The ship was abandoned in the Atlantic Ocean. She was on a voyage from Liverpool to New York.
De La Czar	Spain	The steamship was wrecked on Santa Maria Island, Azores with the loss of a crew member. She was on a voyage from Havana, Cuba to Cádiz.
Due Adelfi	Italy	The ship was sunk by ice in the Danube.
Due Fratelli	Greece	The lighter was sunk by ice at Brăila.
Dumfries	United Kingdom	The steamship ran aground on the Isle of Whithorn, Wigtownshire.
Ealing Grove	United Kingdom	The ship was wrecked on Anholt, Denmark. Her crew were rescued. She was on a voyage from Kronstadt, Russia to London.
E. K. Brown	United Kingdom	The schooner was wrecked on the Riding Rocks with the loss of her captain. She was on a voyage from "San Andreas" to Baltimore, Maryland, United States.
Eleanor	United Kingdom	The ship was abandoned at sea. She was on a voyage from Waterford to Providence, Rhode Island, United States.
Elizabeth Parker	United Kingdom	The ship ran aground at Constantinople, Ottoman Empire. She was on a voyage from Nikolaieff, Russia to a British port. She was refloated and resumed her voyage.
Ellen	United Kingdom	The ship was damaged by ice at Cuxhaven, Germany and became leaky.
Emperor	United Kingdom	The ship was wrecked on St. Paul's Island.
Europa	United Kingdom	The ship was abandoned in the Atlantic Ocean. She was on a voyage from the Clyde to New York.
Evangelistra	Greece	Captain Anagna's brig was wrecked in the Black Sea before 23 December with the loss of all hands.
Evangelistra	Greece	Captain Dragoniano's brig was wrecked in the Black Sea before 23 December with the loss of all hands.
Evangelistra	Greece	Captain Trissidos's brig was driven ashore at Agathopolis, Ottoman Empire before 23 December. Her crew survived.
Experiment	United Kingdom	The ship was lost whilst bound for Sierra Leone.
Fanquai	United Kingdom	The barque was wrecked between Neil's Harbour and "Trigonisto", Nova Scotia with the loss of all hands.
Fursten	(Russian Empire) Grand Duchy of Finland	The ship was wrecked off Anholt. Her crew were rescued. She was on a voyage from an English port to Stockholm, Sweden.
Forguai	Flag unknown	The ship was wrecked at "Niels".
Fortuna	Netherlands	The ship was abandoned at sea. She was on a voyage from Rotterdam, South Holland to Savona, Italy.
Freya	United States	The ship ran aground on the Seven Foot Knoll, in the Patapsco River. She was on a voyage from Baltimore to Rio de Janeiro, Brazil.
General Chamberlain	United States	The ship was wrecked on the Haaks Bank with the loss of three of her crew. She was on a voyage from Callao, Peru to Hamburg, Germany.
Georg Renaud	Flag unknown	The ship was driven ashore at Ancona, Italy. She was later refloated and completed her voyage.
Halda	United Kingdom	The ship was lost in the Hereford Inlet. She was on a voyage from London to Philadelphia.
Harman	Denmark	The ship was wrecked. She was on a voyage from Newcastle upon Tyne to Nyborg.
Harmony	United Kingdom	The ship ran aground at Saint John's, Newfoundland Colony. She was on a voyage from Saint John's to Dublin.
Haus	Germany	The ship was driven ashore on Bornholm, Denmark. She was on a voyage from Danzig to South America.
Hermann	Flag unknown	The ship was wrecked on the Guatipuru Bank. She was on a voyage from Newport to Pará, Brazil.
Hetty Mary	United Kingdom	The brig was driven ashore at Trapani, Sicily. She was refloated and taken in to Trapani.
Hippolyte	France	The brig ran aground at Algeciras, Spain. She was on a voyage from Marseille, Bouches-du-Rhône to Campeche, Mexico. She was later refloated and towed in to Gibraltar.
Idra	United Kingdom	The ship was wrecked at the Cozzo Spadaro Lighthouse, Sicily.
Ino	United Kingdom	The ship was wrecked near Marstrand, Sweden. Her crew were rescued. She was on a voyage from Hull to Riga, Russia.
Ivo B.	Austria-Hungary	The brig was driven ashore and wrecked near Estepona, Spain. She was on a voyage from Alexandria, Egypt to a British port.
Jabez	Canada	The brigantine foundered in the Gut of Canso with the loss of nine of her ten crew.
Jacob	Sweden	The brig was wrecked with the loss of four of her six crew. She was on a voyage from Gothenburg to Bremen, Germany.
Johanna	Netherlands	The brig was driven ashore on "Rust", Netherlands.
Johanna	Germany	The ship was driven ashore at Sanday, Orkney Islands, United Kingdom. She was refloated on 18 December and towed in to Kirkwall, Orkney Islands in a leaky condition.
John	United Kingdom	The ship ran aground and sank at Pará.
John Duffus	United Kingdom	The ship was wrecked on Prince Edward Island, Canada.
John Trelevan	United Kingdom	The schooner ran aground and sank at Par, Cornwall.
Joseph and Mary Ann	United Kingdom	The ship was driven ashore and wrecked at Wainfleet, Lincolnshire. She was on a voyage from Hamburg to Ipswich, Suffolk. She was refloated on 10 December.
Josephina	Canada	The ship was lost in St George's Bay. She was on a voyage from Labrador, Newfoundland Colony to Montreal, Quebec.
Kora	Sweden	The ship was driven ashore on Öland. She was on a voyage from Lübeck to Nystad.
Lady Jane Stewart	United Kingdom	The ship collided with the brig Francesco Padre (Italy) and sank in the Atlantic Ocean with the loss of five of her crew. Survivors were rescued by Francesco Padre. Lady Jane Stewart was on a voyage from Montevideo to an English port.
Lisette	United States	The ship was wrecked on Grand Cayman, Cayman Islands. She was on a voyage from Rio de Janeiro to Mobile, Alabama.
Logehr Allessandra	Russia	The schooner was wrecked near "Burgaso".
Louisa	United Kingdom	The ship was driven ashore near Zandvoort, North Holland. She was on a voyage from Rangoon, Burma to Amsterdam. She was refloated and taken in to Texel, North Holland.
Madonna della Satelia	Flag unknown	The ship was driven ashore at Schouwen, Zeeland, Netherlands. She was on a voyage from Berdyanski, Russia to Rotterdam.
Maldon	United Kingdom	The ship was abandoned in the Atlantic Ocean before 25 December.
Marco Polo	Italy	The ship was driven ashore near Caorle. She was on a voyage from Newport to Venice.
Maria Eliza	France	The ship was driven ashore at Matane, Quebec. She was on a voyage from Quebec City to Marseille.
Marie Adele	France	The ship ran aground in the Elbe downstream of Cuxhaven.
Marie Steffen	Germany	The ship was driven ashore near Ahlbeck. She was on a voyage from Sunderland to Swinemünde. She was refloated and taken in to Swinemünde.
Mary Sanford	United States	The steamship was destroyed by fire. She was on a voyage from Wilmington, Delaware to Philadelphia, Pennsylvania.
Matrona	Greece	The brig was wrecked in the Black Sea before 23 December with the loss of seven of her crew.
M. E. Corning	United States	The ship was driven ashore at Galveston, Texas. She was on a voyage from London to Galveston.
Mercurius	Netherlands	The derelict ship was taken in to Onsala, Sweden in a waterlogged condition.
Mozart	United Kingdom	The ship was driven ashore in the Savannah River. she was on a voyage from Liverpool to Savannah, Georgia, United States.
Nathaniel	Netherlands	The ship ran aground. She was on a voyage from Hellevoetsluis, Zeeland to Saint Thomas, Virgin Islands. She was refloated and put back to Hellevoetsluis.
Nea Tichi	Greece	The brig was wrecked at "Azios" with the loss of all hands.
Oguerdo	Spain	The brigantine was lost at sea. Her crew were rescued. She was on a voyage from Santander to New York, United States.
Olof	Sweden	The ship was driven ashore near Varberg. She was on a voyage from Newcastle upon Tyne to Helsingborg.
Olsen	Denmark	The ship was driven ashore on Als. She was on a voyage from Odense to Tvedestrand, Norway.
Oriental	United Kingdom	The ship ran aground on the Nore. She was on a voyage from London to Sunderland. She was refloated and resumed her voyage.
Orion	United Kingdom	The ship was destroyed by fire at Galveston. She was on a voyage from Galveston to Liverpool.
Oscar	Sweden	The ship was driven ashore near "Giberghood". She was refloated and taken in to "Prius".
Pauline	United Kingdom	The schooner departed from Belize City, British Honduras in early December. No further trace, presumed foundered with the loss of all hands.
Pembroke	United States	The barque was wrecked near Bottle Creek, North Caicos, Caicos Islands. She was on a voyage from Baltimore to Colón, United States of Colombia.
Penang	United States	The ship was driven ashore at Orleans, Massachusetts. She was on a voyage from Yloilo, Spanish East Indies to Boston, Massachusetts. She was refloated.
Penelope	United Kingdom	The ship was wrecked near Attica, Greece. She was on a voyage from the Danube to a British port.
Percy Douglas	(United Kingdom of Great Britain and Ireland) Jersey	The ship was wrecked on the Krishna Shoal. She was on a voyage from Rangoon to Singapore, Straits Settlements and Bombay, India.
Phoenix	United Kingdom	The ship was wrecked near the exit from the Bosphorus with the loss of two of her crew. She was on a voyage from Galaţi to a British port.
Pingen	Netherlands	The ship was wrecked. She was on a voyage from Riga to Amsterdam.
Pisignio	Portugal	The ship was wrecked near Valencia, Spain.
Pride of England	United Kingdom	The ship was abandoned in ice at Cacouna, Quebec, Canada. She was on a voyage from Quebec City to Greenock, Renfrewshire. She was towed in to Tadoussac, Quebec in February 1872.
Prins Mauritz	Norway	The ship was driven ashore. She was on a voyage from London to Tønsberg. She was refloated and taken in to Fredrikstad, Denmark in a derelict condition.
Radiant	United States	The medium clipper was wrecked on the Crocodile Reef, in the Rhio Strait. She was on a voyage from Singapore to Boston, Massachusetts.
Reullura	United Kingdom	The ship ran aground at Antigua. She was on a voyage from London to Antigua.
Rivière	France	The East Indiaman, a barque, was wrecked at the La Coubre Lighthouse, Charente-Inférieure with the loss of two of the sixteen people on board. One crew member was saved, thirteen were reported missing. She was on a voyage from the River Plate to the Gironde.
Rocket	United Kingdom	The schooner struck the Indian Rocks, Prince Edward Island and was beached in the Wood Islands.
Rouen	France	The tug was lost near Rouen, Seine-Inférieure.
Russell	United Kingdom	The steamship was driven ashore at Kertch, Russia.
Russia	United Kingdom	The barque was wrecked off Anticosti Island, Quebec, Canada before 6 December with the loss of a crew member. She was on a voyage from Quebec City to Troon, Ayrshire.
Sahim Deria	Ottoman Empire	The brig ran aground on the Guchialo Rock.
San Animo	Flag unknown	The steamship sank in the Black Sea off the entrance to the Bosphorus.
San Demetrio	Flag unknown	The ship was wrecked near Gallipoli, Ottoman Empire. She was on a voyage from Constantinople to Dunkirk, Nord, France.
San Nicolo	Greece	The brig was wrecked at Kiliya, Russia.
San Spiridone	Greece	The schooner was wrecked near Attica. She was on a voyage from Taganrog, Russia to Cephalonia.
S. D.	United Kingdom	The barque was wrecked 16 nautical miles (30 km) from Dénia, Spain. She was on a voyage from Marseille to Calcutta.
Seine	France	The steamship was driven ashore at Torekov, Sweden. She was on a voyage from Havre de Grâce, Seine-Inférieure to Reval.
Skandinavian	Denmark	The ship was wrecked.
Spring	United Kingdom	The schooner ran aground on the Krantsand, in the North Sea. She was refloated several days later and towed in to Cuxhaven.
Star of Peace	United Kingdom	The ship was driven ashore at Nigg, Ross-shire. She was on a voyage from East Wemyss, Fife to Inverness. She was refloated and taken in to Cromarty.
Star of the South	United Kingdom	The ship was wrecked in the Torres Strait.
Stokendale	United Kingdom	The ship was driven ashore at Great Yarmouth. She was on a voyage from Gothenburg, Sweden to a British port.
Susannah	Greece	The brig was wrecked in the Black Sea before 23 December with the loss of all but one of her crew.
Swantewit	Flag unknown	The ship was driven ashore in the Dardanelles. She was refloated and resumed her voyage.
Sweadrop	Germany	The ship ran aground. She was on a voyage from Danzig to Jersey, Channel Islands. She was refloated and put in to Helsingør, Denmark in a leaky condition.
Sydenham	United Kingdom	The ship was driven ashore and wrecked in Jones Inlet. She was on a voyage from Bremen to New York.
Talavera	United Kingdom	The ship was wrecked in San Roman Bay.
Tenasserim	United Kingdom	The ship ran aground. She was on a voyage from Rangoon to London. She was refloated and taken in to Port Said, Egypt.
Theobald	United Kingdom	The ship was driven ashore in the Southwest Passage. She was on a voyage from New Orleans, Louisiana, United States to Liverpool. She was refloated.
Theresa	United Kingdom	The barque was driven ashore at Murray Harbour, Prince Edward Island.
Three Bells	United Kingdom	The ship was wrecked on Goose Island, in the Saint Lawrence River. She was on a voyage from Montreal to Liverpool. She subsequently floated off and drove ashore near "Strochs".
Three Sisters	United Kingdom	The ship foundered. Her crew were rescued. She was on a voyage from Berdyanski Russia to an English port.
Tolo	(Russian Empire) Grand Duchy of Finland	The ship ran aground on the Malgrundet, in the Baltic Sea. Her crew were rescued. She was on a voyage from Turku to Copenhagen, Denmark. She subsequently floated off and drove out to sea.
Two Sisters	United Kingdom	The fishing smack was lost with all hands.
Union	Norway	The ship was wrecked at "Wingo" with the loss of two of her crew. She was on a voyage from Sunderland to Gothenburg.
Valkyrien	Norway	The barque ran aground off Leander's Tower, Ottoman Empire. She was on a voyage from Constantinople to an English port.
Veritas	United Kingdom	The ship ran aground on the Goodwin Sands, Kent. She was on a voyage from Boulogne, Pas-de-Calais, France to Sunderland. She was refloated.
Viola	United Kingdom	The ship was abandoned off the "Pillars" before 4 December. She was on a voyage from Montreal to Liverpool. She subsequently came ashore at Saint-Roch, Quebec City.
Volunteer	United States	The barque foundered "in the Spanish Sea". Eight crew were rescued by St. Arosa (Flag unknown). Volunteer was on a voyage from Norfolk, Virginia to Marseille.
Vortex	United Kingdom	The barque ran aground. She was refloated and taken in to Darien, Georgia, United States, where she was condemned.
William Leckie	United Kingdom	The ship ran aground in the Dardanelles. She was on a voyage from Sunderland to Constantinople She was refloated and completed her voyage.
William Robertson	United Kingdom	The ship was driven ashore at Flamborough Head, Yorkshire. She was on a voyage from London to South Shields. She was refloated and resumed her voyage.
Wiltshire	United Kingdom	The ship ran aground on the Diamond Reef. She was on a voyage from Calcutta to New York.
Winfield Scott	United States	The ship was driven ashore. She was refloated and taken in to Savannah, Georgia in a leaky condition.
Wuojaki	(Russian Empire) Grand Duchy of Finland	The schooner was wrecked on Hiiumaa, Russia. She was on a voyage from a Finnish port to Riga.
Three unnamed vessels	Flags unknown	The ships were driven ashore on Öland.
Unnamed	Canada	The schooner was wrecked in the Avon River with the loss of eleven lives.
