= List of shipwrecks in December 1828 =

The list of shipwrecks in December 1828 includes all ships sunk, foundered, grounded, or otherwise lost during December 1828.

== 1 December ==
List of shipwrecks: 1 December 1828
Ship	State	Description
Aim	United Kingdom	The ship ran aground on the Newcombe Sand, in the North Sea off the coast of Norfolk. She subsequently came ashore at Pakefield, Suffolk. Her crew were rescued. Aim was on a voyage from Sunderland, County Durham, to London.
Alpha	United Kingdom	The ship was driven ashore and wrecked at Cromer, Norfolk. She was on a voyage from London to Spalding, Lincolnshire.
Ann	United Kingdom	The ship was driven ashore at Great Yarmouth, Norfolk. She was on a voyage from Sunderland, County Durham, to London.
Anne Maria	United Kingdom	The collier was driven wrecked at Deal, Kent.
Arundel	United Kingdom	The ship was driven ashore at North Somercotes, Lincolnshire.
Busick	United Kingdom	The ship was driven ashore near Kettleness Point, Yorkshire.
Carolina	United Kingdom	The ship was driven ashore at Scarborough.
Crisis	United Kingdom	The ship was driven ashore at Waxholme, Yorkshire.
Doris	United Kingdom	The ship was driven ashore at Hartlepool, County Durham.
Fortune	United Kingdom	The collier was driven ashore at Hartlepool.
Garland	United Kingdom	The ship was wrecked on the Whittaker Spit, in the North Sea off the coast of Essex. Her crew were rescued.
Granicus	United Kingdom	The ship was driven ashore and wrecked near Seaham, County Durham.
Harvey	United Kingdom	The brig was driven ashore at Wells-next-the-Sea, Norfolk.
Henry	United Kingdom	The ship was driven ashore and wrecked at Kettleness Point. Her crew were rescued.
Herring	United Kingdom	The sloop was in collision with another vessel and was consequently beached at Great Yarmouth, Norfolk.
Hull Packet	United Kingdom	The ship was driven ashore near Bridlington, Yorkshire.
Hunter	United Kingdom	The ship was driven ashore and wrecked at Calais, France with the loss of all but three of her crew. She was on a voyage from Memel, Prussia to Swansea, Glamorgan.
Johnson	United Kingdom	The ship was driven ashore and wrecked at Kettleness Point. Her crew were rescued.
Marie Hortense	France	The ship was driven ashore at Wells-next-the-Sea.
Mary	United Kingdom	The barque was wrecked on the Bondicar Rocks, Northumberland with the loss of two of her crew. She was on a voyage from Miramichi, New Brunswick, British North America to Leith, Lothian.
Mary	United Kingdom	The ship was driven ashore at Great Yarmouth. She was on a voyage from London to South Shields, County Durham. Her crew were rescued by rocket apparatus.
Mary and Ann	United Kingdom	The smack foundered in the North Sea off Mundesley, Norfolk. Four of her crew survived.
Mary and Isabella	United Kingdom	The ship was driven ashore at Sea Palling, Norfolk.
Miriam and Jane	United Kingdom	The ship was driven ashore in the Firth of Forth. She was later refloated and taken into South Shields leaking severely.
North Star	United Kingdom	The ship was wrecked on the Barnet Sands, in the North Sea with the loss of all hands.
Paragon	United Kingdom	The ship was driven ashore and wrecked at Whitby. Her crew were rescued by the Whitby Lifeboat.
Pilot	United Kingdom	The ship was driven ashore and wrecked near Seaham.
Prior	United Kingdom	The brig was driven ashore near Waxholme. Her crew were rescued.
Prospect	United Kingdom	The ship was driven ashore at Scarborough.
Samuel Cursins	United Kingdom	The ship was driven ashore at Bridlington.
Sarah	United Kingdom	The ship was abandoned in the Norwegian Sea. She subsequently came ashore at Hammerfest, Norway and was wrecked. Her seven crew survived.
Sophia	United Kingdom	The ship was wrecked at Nyland, Sweden. Her crew were rescued.
Symmetry	United Kingdom	The ship was driven ashore at Scarborough.
Triton	United Kingdom	The schooner was driven ashore and wrecked at Beadnell, Northumberland, with the loss of seven of the eight people on board. She was on a voyage from Libau, Prussia to Newcastle upon Tyne, Northumberland.
Two Brothers	United Kingdom	The collier was wrecked at Sunderland.
Union	United Kingdom	The ship was driven ashore and wrecked at Abram Wyke, Yorkshire. Her crew were rescued.
Union	United Kingdom	The ship was driven ashore and wrecked at Robin Hoods Bay, Yorkshire. Her crew were rescued.
Unity	United Kingdom	The schooner was driven ashore and wrecked at Newton-by-the-Sea, Northumberland with the loss of all but one of her crew.
Waterhouse	United Kingdom	The brig was driven ashore at Happisburgh, Norfolk.
Wellington	United Kingdom	The collier was driven ashore at Hartlepool.
William and Sarah	United Kingdom	The ship was driven ashore at Waxholme with the loss of three of the five people on board. Survivors were rescued by rocket apparatus.

== 2 December ==
List of shipwrecks: 2 December 1828
Ship	State	Description
Ariadne	United Kingdom	The ship was driven ashore at Folkestone, Kent.
Brothers	United Kingdom	The ship was driven ashore and wrecked at Deal, Kent. She was on a voyage from Whitby, Yorkshire to Rye, Sussex.
Dido	United Kingdom	The ship was driven ashore in Bootle Bay. She was on a voyage from Newfoundland, British North America to Liverpool, Lancashire.
Erie	(United Kingdom of Great Britain and Ireland) British North America	The ship was wrecked on the Marnevagan Shoal. She was on a voyage from Quebec City, Lower Canada, to London, United Kingdom.
Hunter	United Kingdom	The ship was driven ashore and wrecked at Calais, France with the loss of five of her eight crew. She was on a voyage from Memel, Prussia to Swansea, Glamorgan.
Thames	United Kingdom	The ship was driven ashore and wrecked on Goree Island with the loss of five lives.
Twee Gebroeders	Netherlands	The ship was driven ashore and wrecked on "Goree Island". Her crew were rescued. She was on a voyage from Surinam to Rotterdam, South Holland.
Union	United Kingdom	The ship was driven ashore and wrecked near Youghal, County Cork. Her crew were rescued. She was on a voyage from Youghal to Penryn, Cornwall.

== 3 December ==
List of shipwrecks: 3 December 1828
Ship	State	Description
Calypso	Sweden	The ship was wrecked on the south coast of Bornholm, Denmark. She was on a voyage from Stockholm to Saint-Brieuc, Côtes-du-Nord, France.
Emanuel	United Kingdom	The ship was driven ashore and sunk at Inverkeithing, Fife.
Jane	United Kingdom	The ship was driven ashore at Whitehaven, Cumberland. She was on a voyage from Lancaster, Lancashire, to Glasgow, Renfrewshire.
John	United Kingdom	The ship was driven ashore at Harrington, Cumberland. She was on a voyage from Liverpool, Lancashire to Carlisle, Cumberland.
Minerva	Hamburg	The ship was wrecked on the Vogel Sand, in the North Sea.
Octavia	United Kingdom	The ship was driven ashore at Harrington. She was on a voyage from Liverpool to Whitehaven.
Riga	Russia	The ship was driven ashore at Lista, Norway. Her crew were rescued. She was on a voyage from Riga to London, United Kingdom.
Syrragus	Russia	The ship was driven ashore at Lista. Her crew were rescued. She was on a voyage from Riga to London.
Tyler	United States	The ship was wrecked on Nantucket Island with the loss of all but one of her crew. She was on a voyage from Saint Petersburg, Russian Empire, to Providence, Rhode Island.

== 4 December ==
List of shipwrecks: 4 December 1828
Ship	State	Description
Doris	United Kingdom	The ship was wrecked on Skagen, Denmark. Her crew were rescued. She was on a voyage from Danzig, Prussia, to London.
Hannah	United Kingdom	The ship foundered off the Isle of Mull. Her crew were rescued. She was on a voyage from Wick, Caithness, to Coleraine, County Antrim.

== 5 December ==
List of shipwrecks: 5 December 1828
Ship	State	Description
Newcastle	United Kingdom	The ship foundered in the North Sea off Whitby, Yorkshire. Her crew survived.
Thames	United Kingdom	The ship was wrecked on the coast of South Holland, Netherlands.

== 6 December ==
List of shipwrecks: 6 December 1828
Ship	State	Description
Albion	United Kingdom	The ship was lost in Ballimore Bay with the loss of four lives. She was on a voyage from Cork to Lisbon, Portugal.
Aurora	United Kingdom	The ship was driven ashore at Maryport, Cumberland. She was on a voyage from Beaumaris, Anglesey, to Liverpool, Lancashire.
Forrest	United States	The ship was wrecked on Little Cumbrae, Ayrshire, United Kingdom. She was on a voyage from Charleston, South Carolina, to Greenock, Renfrewshire, United Kingdom.
Joseph and Dorothy	United Kingdom	The ship was wrecked on the coast of County Cork with the loss of all hands.
Lycurgus	United Kingdom	The ship was wrecked at Lista, Norway. She was on a voyage from Riga, Russia to London.
Providentia	Portugal	The schooner was lost on the Red Strand, in the Atlantic Ocean off Clonakilty, County Cork, United Kingdom.
Union	United Kingdom	The schooner was driven ashore and wrecked in Tralee Bay.

== 7 December ==
List of shipwrecks: 7 December 1828
Ship	State	Description
Cambrian	United Kingdom	The ship was lost on Priestholm, Anglesey. Her crew were rescued. She was on a voyage from Liverpool, Lancashire, to Aberdyfi, Merionethshire.
Clwyd	United Kingdom	The ship was wrecked near Waterford.
Corsair	United Kingdom	The schooner foundered in the North Sea off Aberdeen with the loss of a crew member.
Corsair	United Kingdom	The ship was lost near Beaumaris, Anglesey. She was on a voyage from the Firth of Forth to Aberdyfi.
Earl of Royden	United Kingdom	The steamship was driven ashore and wrecked at Derbyhaven, Isle of Man. She was on a voyage from Liverpool to Dundalk, County Louth.
Eliza and Mary	United Kingdom	The ship was driven ashore near Beaumaris. She was on a voyage from Liverpool to Gibraltar.
Enterprise	United Kingdom	The schooner foundered off Creden Head, County Waterford with the loss of all hands. She was on a voyage from Newport, Monmouthshire to Waterford.
Garland	United Kingdom	The schooner was lost with all hands at the entrance to the Seaforth Loch.
Hawke	United Kingdom	The sloop was driven ashore at Peterhead, Aberdeenshire. Her crew survived.
James	United Kingdom	The ship was driven ashore in "Bay Castle" and sank. She was on a voyage from Limerick to Liverpool, Lancashire.
Mary	United Kingdom	The ship was driven ashore at Warkworth, Northumberland with the loss of two of her crew.
Veronica	United Kingdom	The brig was lost in Dingle Bay. All eighteen people on board were rescued. She was on a voyage from Liverpool to Charleston, South Carolina, United States.
Vigilant	United Kingdom	The ship was wrecked at Galley Head, County Cork.
Willwood	United Kingdom	The ship was wrecked in the River Tay with the loss of all hands.

== 8 December ==
List of shipwrecks: 8 December 1828
Ship	State	Description
Graf von Essen	Prussia	The ship was lost on the Middle Ground, in the North Sea. Her crew were rescued.
HMS Jasper	Royal Navy	The Cherokee-class brig-sloop was wrecked in the Ionian Sea off Santa Maura.
Robert Gardon	United Kingdom	The schooner was driven ashore and wrecked on the Isle of Harris, Outer Hebrides with the loss of all hands.

== 9 December ==
List of shipwrecks: 9 December 1828
Ship	State	Description
Jeune Henri	France	The ship was lost at the mouth of the Garonne with the loss of most of her crew.
Pilgrim	United Kingdom	The ship was driven ashore on the coast of Sicily. She was on a voyage from Livorno, Grand Duchy of Tuscany to Palermo, Kingdom of the Two Sicilies.

== 11 December ==
List of shipwrecks: 11 December 1828
Ship	State	Description
Factor	United Kingdom	The smack was wrecked on the Isle of Whithorn, Cumberland with the loss of all hands.

== 12 December ==
List of shipwrecks: 12 December 1828
Ship	State	Description
Dolphin	United Kingdom	The ship sprang a leak and foundered in the North Sea 15 nautical miles (28 km) south of Flamborough Head, Yorkshire. Her crew were rescued by Bee (United Kingdom).
Frederick	France	The ship was wrecked near "Camares". She was on a voyage from Marans, Charente-Maritime to an English port.
Phœnix	United Kingdom	The ship was wrecked on the Praa Sand, Cornwall with the loss of fifteen lives. She was on a voyage from London to the South Seas.

== 13 December ==
List of shipwrecks: 13 December 1828
Ship	State	Description
Samuel Whitbread	United Kingdom	The ship was abandoned in the Atlantic Ocean. She was on a voyage from Quebec City, Lower Canada, British North America to London.

== 14 December ==
List of shipwrecks: 14 December 1828
Ship	State	Description
Margaret	United Kingdom	The ship was abandoned in the Atlantic Ocean. She was on a voyage from Quebec City, Lower Canada, British North America to London. Margaret came ashore at the Burrow of Ballyteague, County Wexford on 23 December and was wrecked.

== 15 December ==
List of shipwrecks: 15 December 1828
Ship	State	Description
James	United Kingdom	The ship was driven ashore near Rush, County Dublin. She was on a voyage from Newport, Monmouthshire to Glasgow, Renfrewshire.
Sir Thomas Cochrane	United Kingdom	The ship was wrecked at Cape St. Francis, Newfoundland, British North America. She was on a voyage from Brigus, Newfoundland to Liverpool, Lancashire.

== 16 December ==
List of shipwrecks: 16 December 1828
Ship	State	Description
Helen	United Kingdom	The ship was driven ashore and wrecked at the mouth of the River Shannon.
James	United Kingdom	The ship ran aground and was wrecked at Portrane, County Dublin. Her crew were rescued. She was on a voyage from Newport, Monmouthshire to Greenock, Renfrewshire.

== 17 December ==
List of shipwrecks: 17 December 1828
Ship	State	Description
Asp	United Kingdom	The whaler was wrecked on the Mudge Rocks, Madagascar. Her crew were rescued.
North Briton	(United Kingdom of Great Britain and Ireland) New South Wales	The sloop was wrecked on this date.

== 18 December ==
List of shipwrecks: 18 December 1828
Ship	State	Description
Camilla	United Kingdom	The ship was driven ashore at Lymington, Hampshire. She was on a voyage from Sunderland, County Durham, to Dartmouth, Devon.
Jane	United Kingdom	The ship was driven ashore at Lymington. She was on a voyage from London to Liverpool, Lancashire.
Union	United Kingdom	The ship was driven ashore at Lymington. She was on a voyage from Newhaven, Sussex, to Liverpool.

== 19 December ==
List of shipwrecks: 19 December 1828
Ship	State	Description
Ann	United Kingdom	The ship was beached on Götaland, Sweden, where she became a wreck. Her crew were rescued. She was on a voyage from Riga, Russia to Grangemouth, Stirlingshire.
Betsys	United Kingdom	The sloop sprang a leak and foundered in the North Sea off Lindisfarne, Northumberland. Her three crew survived. She was on a voyage from Newcastle upon Tyne, Northumberland to Eyemouth, Berwickshire.
James	United Kingdom	The ship sprang a leak and was beached near Portrane, County Dublin.
Trimley	United Kingdom	The ship ran aground on the Barber Sand, in the North Sea off the coast of Norfolk and sank.
William	United Kingdom	The West Indiaman, a brig, was driven ashore and wrecked near Boulogne, Pas-de-Calais, France with the loss of all hands.
Unity	United Kingdom	The ship was wrecked on the Haisborough Sands, in the North Sea off the coast of Norfolk. Her crew were rescued. She was on a voyage from Quebec City, Lower Canada, British North America to Hull, Yorkshire.

== 20 December ==
List of shipwrecks: 20 December 1828
Ship	State	Description
Sarah	United States	The sloop was wrecked on Birsay, Orkney Islands, United Kingdom. Her crew were rescued.

== 22 December ==
List of shipwrecks: 22 December 1828
Ship	State	Description
Active	United Kingdom	The ship was wrecked on the Haltholms. She was on a voyage from Haverfordwest, Pembrokeshire, to Bristol, Gloucestershire.
Frederick	Netherlands	The ship departed from Batavia, Netherlands East Indies for Antwerp. No further trace, presumed foundered with the loss of all hands.
John	United Kingdom	The ship was beached on the Isle of Harris. Her crew were rescued. She was on a voyage from Quebec City, Lower Canada, British North America to Galway.

== 23 December ==
List of shipwrecks: 23 December 1828
Ship	State	Description
Sheffield	United Kingdom	The steamship was wrecked on the Scull-Martin Rocks, in the Irish Sea off Ballywalter, County Antrim. All on board were rescued. She was on a voyage from Liverpool, Lancashire, to Dublin.

== 24 December ==
List of shipwrecks: 24 December 1828
Ship	State	Description
Corsair	United Kingdom	The ship was driven ashore and wrecked at Aberdeen.
Leeds	United States	The ship ran aground and sank in the River Thames at Wapping, London, United Kingdom. She was on a voyage from New York to London

== 25 December ==
List of shipwrecks: 25 December 1828
Ship	State	Description
Louisa	United Kingdom	The ship was wrecked at "Wedgin". She was on a voyage from Riga, Russia to Londonderry.

== 26 December ==
List of shipwrecks: 26 December 1828
Ship	State	Description
Marigold	United Kingdom	The brig foundered in Luce Bay. Her crew were rescued. She was on a voyage from Maryport, Cumberland, to Belfast, County Antrim.

== 27 December ==
List of shipwrecks: 27 December 1828
Ship	State	Description
Albion	United Kingdom	The ship ran aground on the Barber Sand, in the North Sea off the coast of Norfolk She was consequently beached at Caister-on-Sea. Albion was refloated the next day and taken in to Great Yarmouth.
Ambler	United Kingdom	The ship struck the pier at São Miguel, Azores, Portugal and was wrecked.
Delta	United Kingdom	The ship was driven ashore at Sand Hale, Lincolnshire. Se was on a voyage from Saint Petersburg, Russia to London.
Guernsey	United Kingdom	The ship struck a rock and foundered in Pann's Bay, Jersey.
Hermenia	United States	The ship was abandoned in the Atlantic Ocean (34°40′N 63°39′W). Her crew were rescued by Sarah and Caroline (United Kingdom). She was on a voyage from Philadelphia, Pennsylvania, to Rio Grande do Sul, Brazil.
Jonah	United Kingdom	The ship was wrecked on Yell, Shetland Islands. She was on a voyage from Onega, Russia, to London.
Josiah	United Kingdom	The ship was wrecked near Lerwick, Shetland Islands.

== 28 December ==
List of shipwrecks: 28 December 1828
Ship	State	Description
HMS Kangaroo	Royal Navy	The ship was wrecked on the Hogsty Reef, Bahamas.

== 29 December ==
List of shipwrecks: 29 December 1828
Ship	State	Description
Harrow	United Kingdom	The ship ran aground on the Herd Sand, in the North Sea off Hartlepool, County Durham.
Mary	United Kingdom	The ship ran aground on the Seaton House Rocks, in the North Sea off Boulmer, Northumberland.
Sarah	United Kingdom	The ship was driven ashore and wrecked at the Brough of Birsey, Aberdeenshire. She was on a voyage from Liverpool, Lancashire, to Aberdeen.
Thetis	United Kingdom	The smack ran aground on the Bondicar Rocks, in the North Sea off the coast of Northumberland. She was on a voyage from Hull, Yorkshire to Aberdeen.
York Merchant	United Kingdom	The ship departed from Gothenburg, Sweden for Hull. Presumed subsequently foundered in the North Sea as a mast from her washed up at Aberdeen.

== 30 December ==
List of shipwrecks: 30 December 1828
Ship	State	Description
Elbing	Elbing	The ship was driven ashore and wrecked at Pillau. She was on a voyage from London, United Kingdom to Danzig.
Sarah	United Kingdom	The ship was wrecked on the Bowmore Rock, in the North Sea off North Sunderland, County Durham.
Thetis	United Kingdom	The smack was wrecked on the Bondicar Rocks, in the North Sea off Warkworth, Northumberland. She was on a voyage from Hull, Yorkshire to Aberdeen.

== 31 December ==
List of shipwrecks: 31 December 1828
Ship	State	Description
Friendship	United Kingdom	The ship sprang a leak and foundered in the North Sea off the mouth of the River Tees. She was on a voyage from Sunderland, County Durham, to King's Lynn, Norfolk.
Lord Nelson	United Kingdom	The schooner foundered in the Irish Sea off Douglas, Isle of Man with the loss of all six crew. She was on a voyage from Dumfries to Liverpool, Lancashire.
Urania	Sweden	The ship was driven ashore and sank at "Cartellazzo". She was on a voyage from Bergen, Norway to Venice, Austrian Empire.

== Unknown date ==
List of shipwrecks: Unknown date in December 1828
Ship	State	Description
Amity	United Kingdom	The ship was wrecked in the Saint Lawrence River, British North America before 16 December. She was on a voyage from Quebec City, Lower Canada, British North America to London.
Ann and Eliza	United Kingdom	The ship was lost near Broughton, Flintshire. She was on a voyage from Skibbereen, County Cork, to Liverpool, Lancashire.
Charles	United Kingdom	The ship ran aground off Beaumaris, Anglesey. She was on a voyage from Dublin to London.
Edward	United Kingdom	The ship was abandoned in the Irish Sea. She was on a voyage from Whitehaven, Cumberland, to Dublin. Edward came ashore at Southerness, Dumfriesshire, and was wrecked.
Elegant	United Kingdom	The brig foundered off "Wingo", Sweden.
Hope	United Kingdom	The ship was wrecked in the Saint Lawrence River before 11 December.
Montmorency	United Kingdom	The ship was wrecked in the Saint Lawrence River before 16 December. She was on a voyage from Quebec City to Bristol, Gloucestershire.
Sarah	United Kingdom	The ship was wrecked in Glenluce Bay. She was on a voyage from Maryport, Cumberland, to Belfast, County Antrim.
Victoria	flag unknown	The ship was lost on the coast of the Grand Duchy of Finland. She was on a voyage from Bordeaux, Gironde, France to Helsingfors, Finland.
Volga	flag unknown	The ship foundered in the North Sea off Tönning, Duchy of Holstein.
