= Black Mill, Waxholme =

Details of a local landmark at Waxholme – Back Mill

Coordinates: 53°44′32″N 0°00′33″E

Black Mill, (or Owthorne Mill (Note: Although closer to Waxholme, the mill was built a few yards within the then parish boundary of Owthorne.)), Waxholme, is a local landmark in the hamlet of Waxholme close to the town of Withernsea, East Riding of Yorkshire, England.

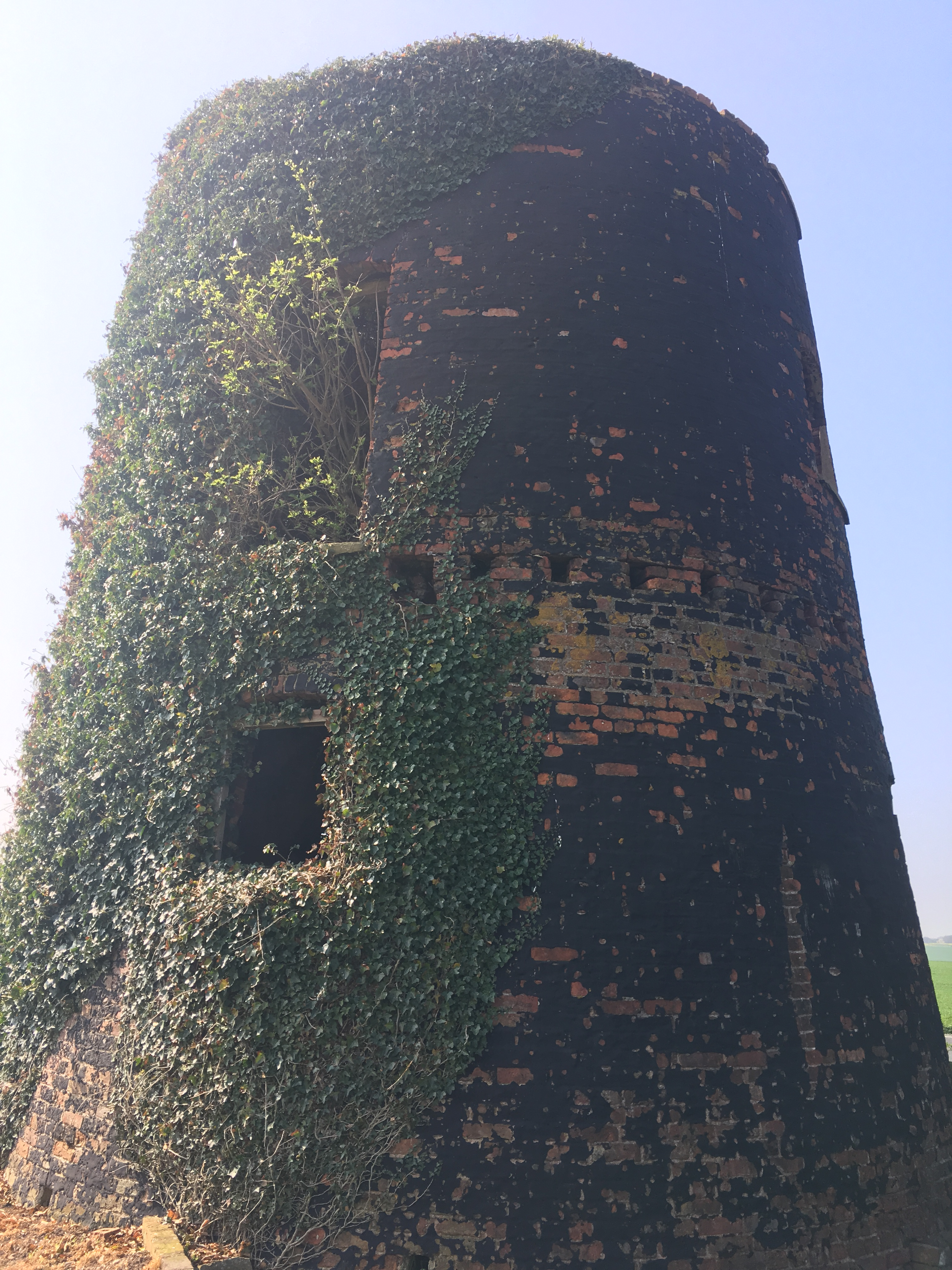
Remains of Black Mill at Waxholme

A tower windmill, only the bottom half of the tower remains after the top was removed in the World Wars and used as a lookout over the North Sea. There has been a windmill on the site since at least 1648. The last record of it being a working mill is around 1900.

== Tolkien The Two Towers hypothesis ==
During the First World War J. R. R. Tolkien was stationed for a time at Thirtle Bridge only a mile or so from Waxholme and Withernsea. It is well documented that he found inspiration, created languages and wrote stories while in the area. A book detailing the Tolkien Triangle in East Yorkshire contains many such references. One of the most well documented inspirations relates to when Tolkien watched his wife Edith sing and dance in the woods adjacent to Roos church near where she stayed while Tolkien was stationed in East Yorkshire which gave him the inspiration for the Elven princess Lúthien Tinúviel. A number of articles have been written based on the information in the book including 'Dreaming shires: how East Yorkshire shaped Tolkiens Middle-earth fantasy' and 'How East Yorkshire inspired the worlds of The Hobbit and Lord of the Rings'.

From Thirtle Bridge the lighthouse at Withernsea stands tall on the horizon less than 2 miles away. The Black Mill at Waxholme, while not as tall, but sited halfway between the two has a strong influence on the view from Thirtle Bridge standing as it does on high ground. These two 'towers' have been put forward as possible inspiration for the towers in the title of Tolkien's second volume of The Lord of the Rings, The Two Towers.

The mill is referenced as possible inspiration for the Two Towers themselves by local Tolkien author Phil Mathison in his book Tolkien in Holderness. An excerpt from the book on the mill and lighthouse was published in the Holderness Gazette. Michael Flowers of the Tolkien Society notes that in Tolkien's drawings of the Two Towers, the White Tower is always depicted looking remarkably lighthouse like, this can be seen most compellingly in the original cover Tolkien created for the Two Towers book, a cover which was rejected by the publishers but which HarperCollins resurrected in 1998 for their 3 volume print.

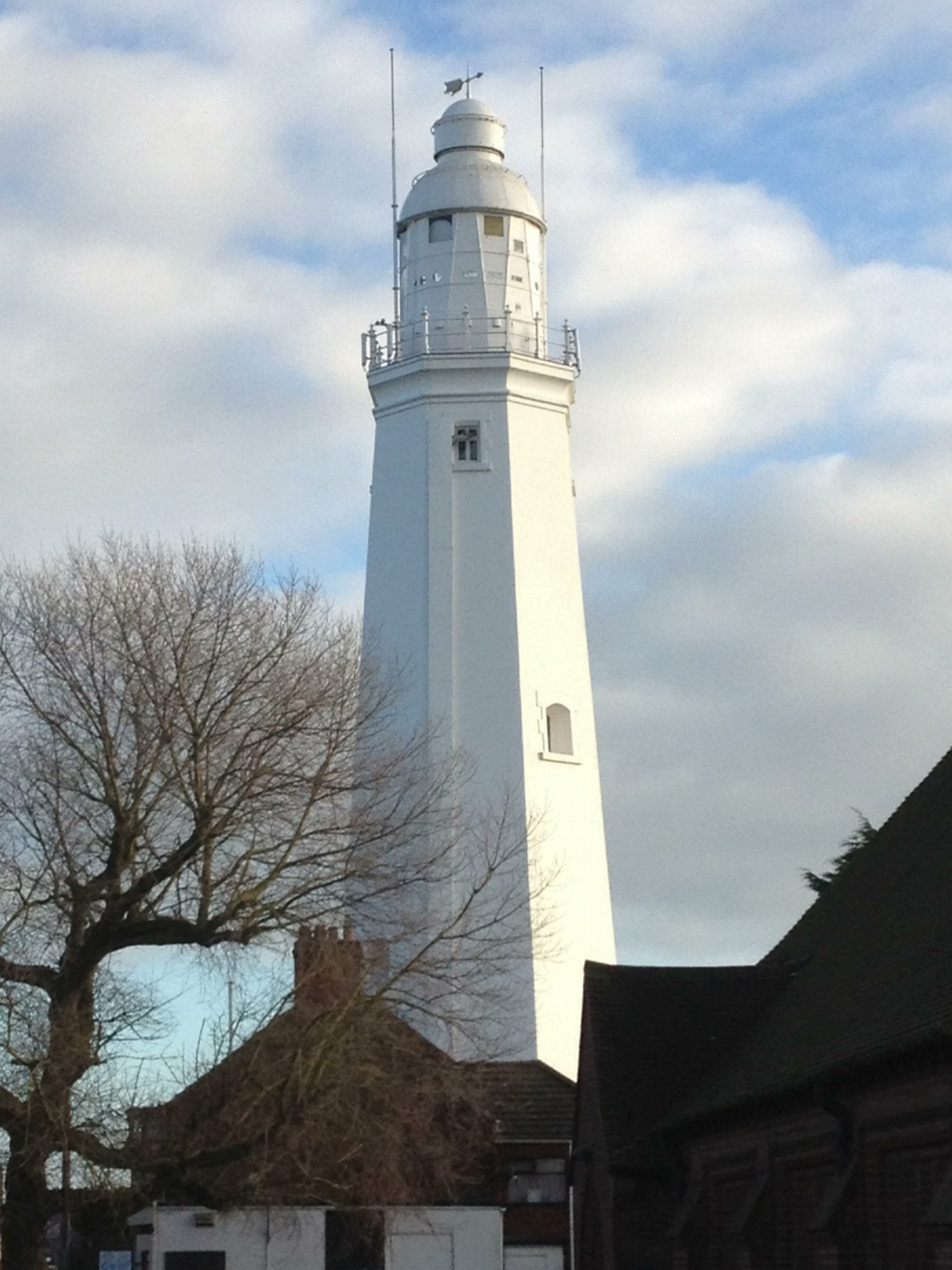
Photo of Withernsea Lighthouse taken in 2012 from Hull Road.

Tolkien's original cover design for the Two Towers volume of the Lord of the RIngs.

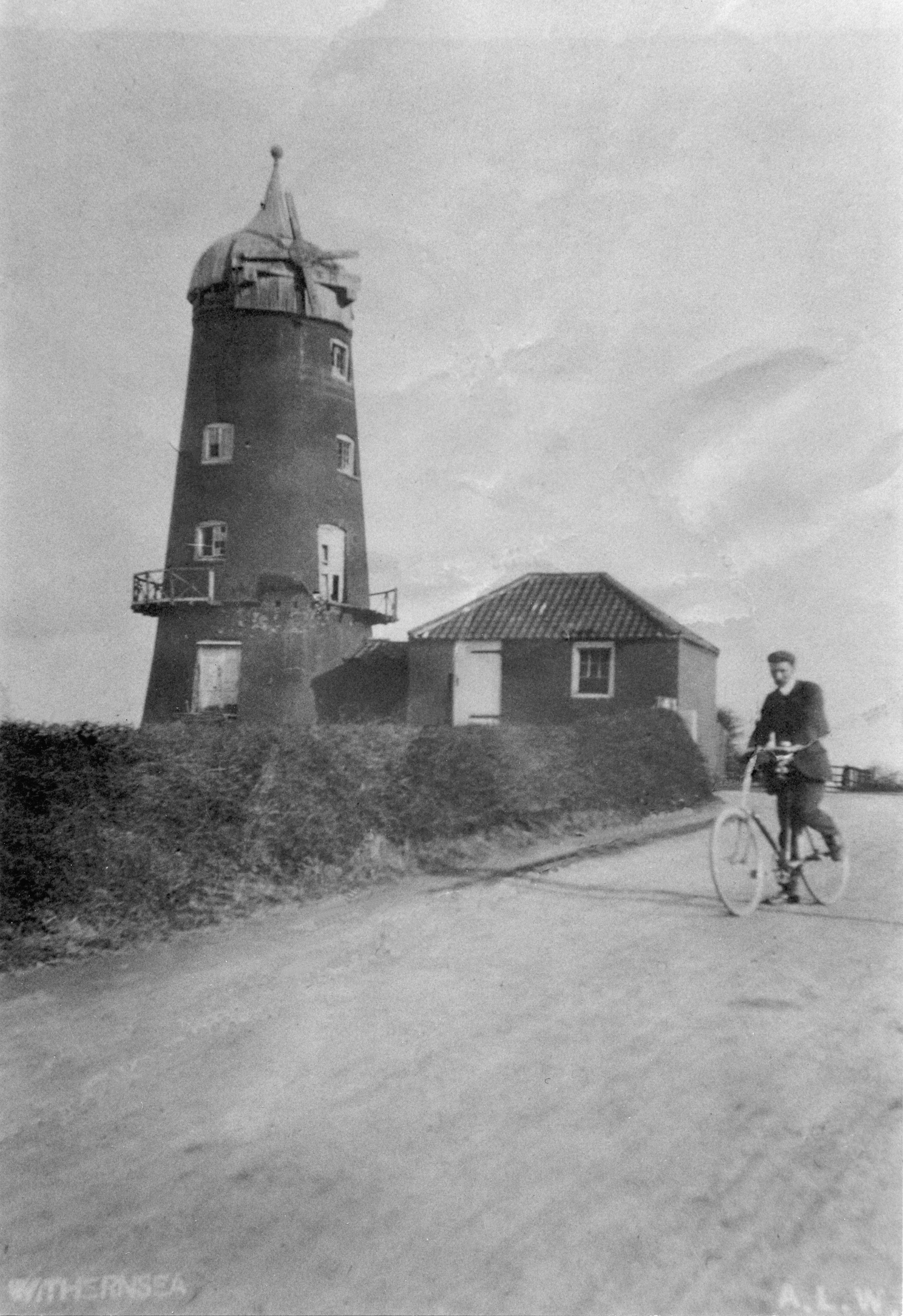
Photo of Black Mill c. 1905, after the sails had been removed but before the top was removed by the army in the First World War
