= Listed buildings in Rimswell =

Rimswell is a civil parish in the county of the East Riding of Yorkshire, England. It contains five listed buildings that are recorded in the National Heritage List for England. All the listed buildings are designated at Grade II, the lowest of the three grades, which is applied to "buildings of national importance and special interest". The parish contains the village of Rimswell and the surrounding countryside. The listed buildings consist of a farmhouse, a house, a church, and a water tower and associated structures.

== Buildings ==
Name and location	Photograph	Date	Notes
Shaw Farmhouse; 53.73566°N 0.00215°W	—	Mid-18th century	The farmhouse is in brick, with stepped eaves, and a pantile roof with tumbled-in brick to the raised gables. There are two storeys, three bays, and a rear wing on the right. The central doorway has an architrave, and the windows are sashes in architraves.
St Mary's Church; 53.73874°N 0.01300°W		1801	The church is built in stone faced in yellow brick, partly rendered, with dressings in limestone and red brick, and a tile roof. It consists of a nave, a chancel and a west tower. The tower has three stages, and contains a round-arched doorway with a fanlight in a round-arched red brick panel, bands, round-arched panels in the middle stage, and above are round-arched bell openings a dentilled brick cornice, and a rendered stone coped parapet with sandstone angle pinnacles. Along the sides of the church are pilasters and round-arched panels with impost bands, containing inserted twin round-headed windows, above which are a dentilled cornice, a string course, a frieze and a stone coped gable.
Blue Hall; 53.72990°N 0.00375°W		Early 19th century	The house is in grey brick, with red brick on the right return, a moulded wooden eaves board, and a hipped Westmorland slate roof. There are two storeys, a double depth plan, and three bays. In the centre is a Doric doorcase with attached columns and a moulded cornice, and a door with a radial fanlight in a round-headed reveal. The windows are sashes in recessed architraves with channelled stucco cambered arches and keystones.
Rimswell Water Tower; 53.73029°N 0.02210°W		1916	The water tower is in reinforced concrete, and has a circular plan, with a projecting entrance on the west, and there are three stages. The base has a single storey and is drum-shaped, with a central tower and eight columns carrying a cylindrical water tank on which is a short central turret with a conical roof. The base has a chamfered plinth, pilaster strips, a cornice and a coped blocking course. The doorway has a raised surround and a stepped keystone, to its left is an inscribed and dated plaque, and above it is a coat of arms in relief. The columns are square and chamfered with moulded capitals, carrying segmental arches and moulded brackets. The tank has pilaster strips, a band, a cornice and a blocking course.
Gate, walls and railings, Rimswell Water Tower; 53.73022°N 0.02241°W		1916	The semicircular area containing the water tower is enclosed by dwarf concrete walls with wrought iron railings and gates. At intervals are twelve square concrete piers with chamfered plinths, cornices and pyramidal caps. The end piers and gate piers are similar but larger, the gate piers with initials, the date and coats of arms.
