= Rimswell =

Village and civil parish in the East Riding of Yorkshire, England

Coordinates: 53.738223°N 0.011959°W

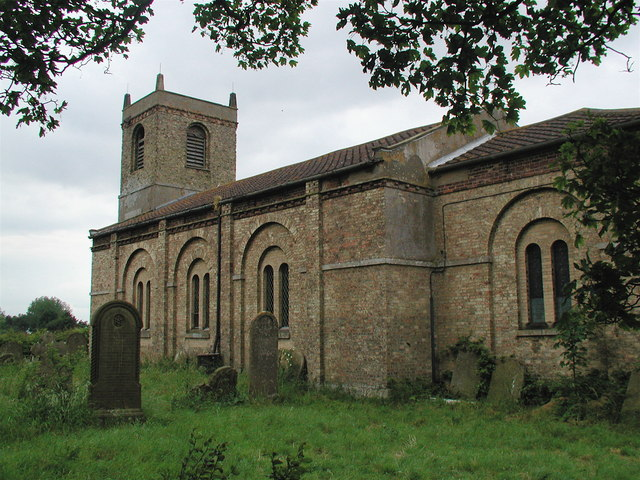
- St Mary's Church

- Location within the East Riding of Yorkshire
- Population: 235 (2011 census)
- OS grid reference: TA312287
  - London: 155 mi (249 km) S
- Civil parish: Rimswell
- Unitary authority: East Riding of Yorkshire
- Ceremonial county: East Riding of Yorkshire
- Region: Yorkshire and the Humber
- Country: England
- Sovereign state: United Kingdom
- Post town: WITHERNSEA
- Postcode district: HU19
- Dialling code: 01964
- Police: Humberside
- Fire: Humberside
- Ambulance: Yorkshire
- UK Parliament: Beverley and Holderness

Rimswell is a village and civil parish in the East Riding of Yorkshire, England, in an area known as Holderness. It is situated approximately 2 miles (3 km) north-west of Withernsea and it lies between the B1243 and B1362 roads.

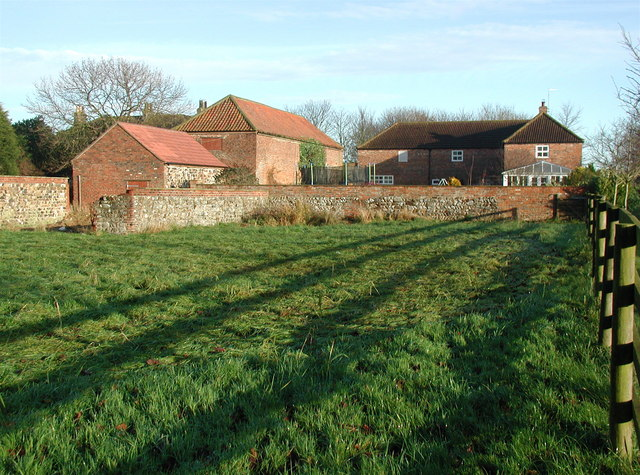
White House Farm, Rimswell

The civil parish is formed by the village of Rimswell and the hamlet of Waxholme. According to the 2011 UK census, Rimswell parish had a population of 235, an increase on the 2001 UK census figure of 198.

The name Rimswell possibly derives from the Old English Rymiswella meaning 'Rymi's spring'. Alternatively, the first element could be derived from the Old Norse personal name Hrimr, and the second element could be the Old English swelle, referring to a 'swelling in the land'.

The Anglican St Mary's Church, Rimswell, now closed, is a Grade II listed building.

The Prime Meridian passes just to the east of Rimswell.

In 1823 Rimswell was in the parish of Owthorne, a village since lost to coastal erosion. Rimswell inhabitants numbered 129, and occupations included ten farmers, some of whom were land owners, a grocer, and the landlord of the Dog and Duck public house. A carrier operated between the village and Hull on Tuesdays.

== See also ==
- Listed buildings in Rimswell
