= St Mary's Church, Rimswell =

Church building in Rimswell, East Riding of Yorkshire, England, UK

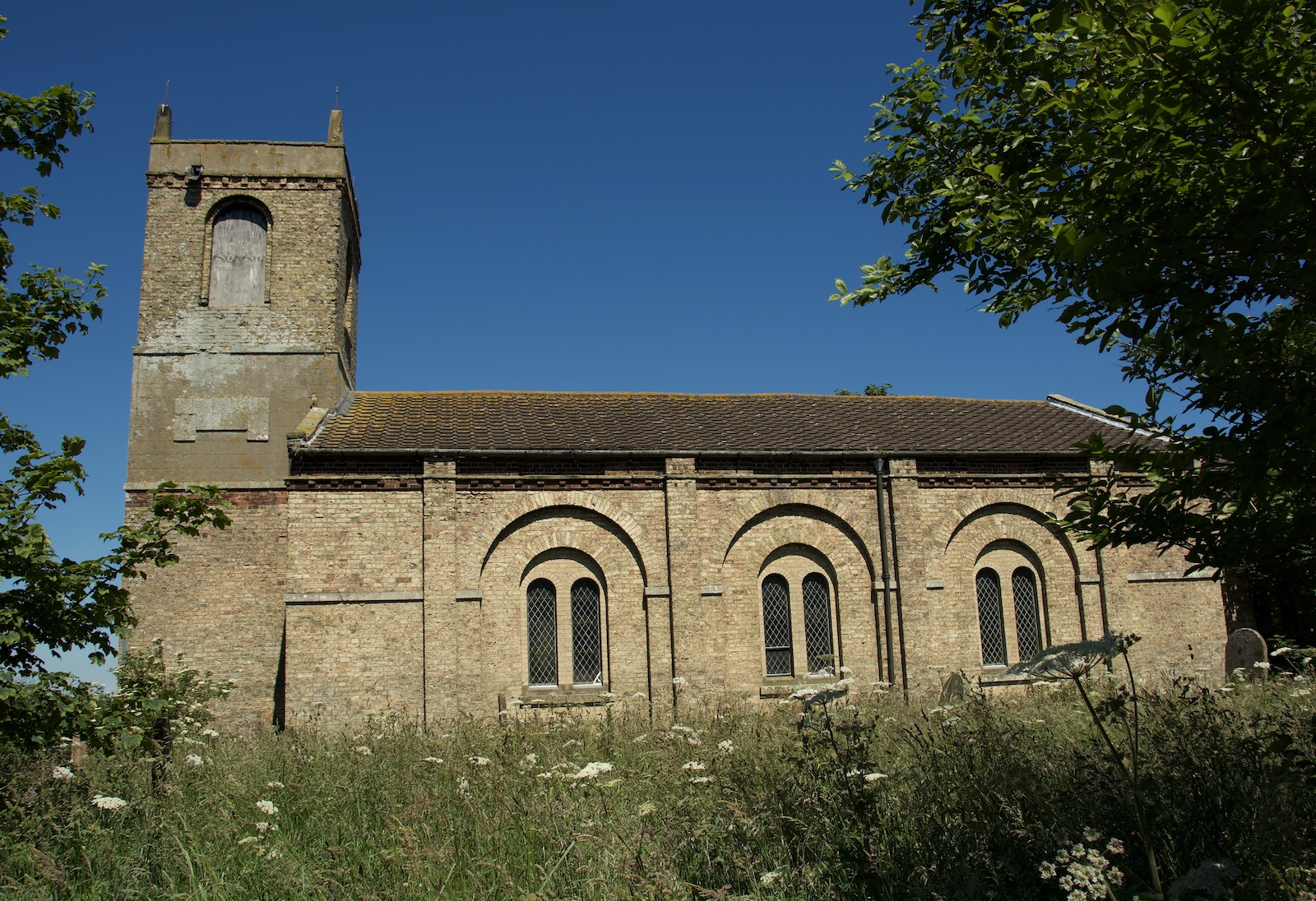
The church, in 2018

St Mary's Church is a disused church in Rimswell, a village in the East Riding of Yorkshire, in England.

In the mediaeval period, Rimswell was in the parish of Owthorne. St Peter's Church in Owthorne was closed in 1796 as coastal erosion had neared the building, and the fittings were removed. The eastern part of the church collapsed in 1816, and the remainder had disappeared by 1822. A replacement was constructed in Rimswell, to a design by Charles Mountain. It was dedicated to Saint Mary and was completed in 1802. In 1885, the west gallery was removed, the windows were altered, and the seats replaced. The building was grade II listed in 1966. Around 1980, the roof was replaced, but in the early 21st century, it closed for worship.

The church is built of stone faced in yellow brick, partly rendered, with dressings in limestone and red brick, and a tile roof. It consists of a nave, a chancel and a west tower. The tower has three stages, and contains a round-arched doorway with a fanlight in a round-arched red brick panel, bands, round-arched panels in the middle stage, and above are round-arched bell openings a dentilled brick cornice, and a rendered stone coped parapet with sandstone angle pinnacles. Along the sides of the church are pilasters and round-arched panels with impost bands, containing inserted twin round-headed windows, above which are a dentilled cornice, a string course, a frieze and a stone coped gable.

== See also ==
- Listed buildings in Rimswell
