= Cozzo Spadaro Lighthouse =

Lighthouse in Sicily, Italy

Cozzo Spadaro
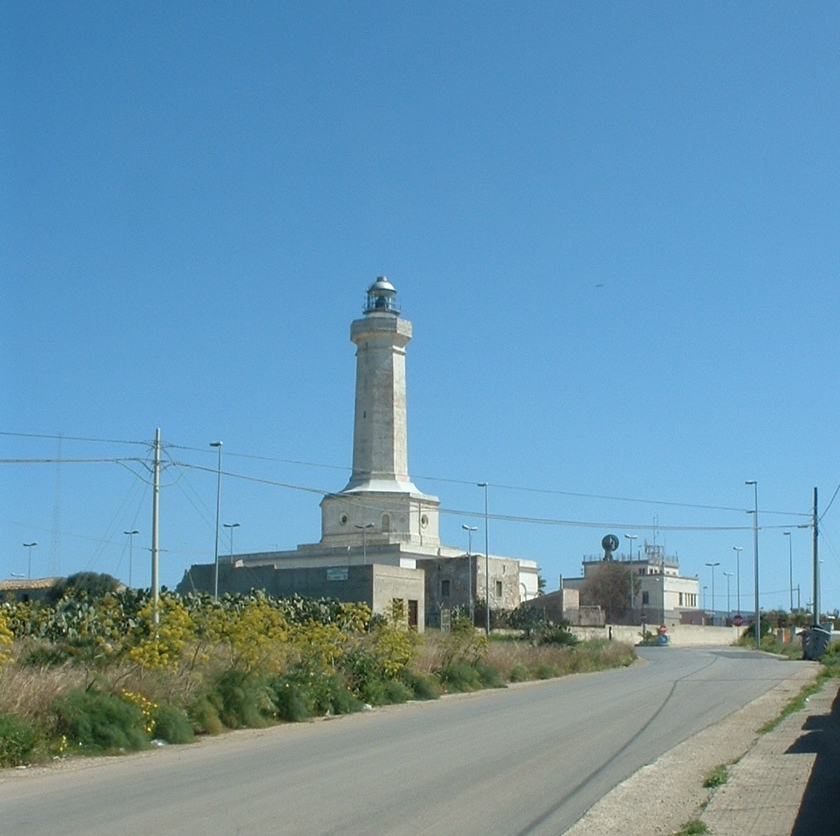
- Cozzo Spadaro Lighthouse
- Location: Portopalo di Capo Passero; Sicily; Italy
- Coordinates: 36°41′10″N 15°07′55″E

Tower
- Constructed: 1864
- Foundation: masonry base
- Construction: stone tower
- Height: 36 metres (118 ft)
- Shape: octagonal tower with balcony and lantern raising from an octagonal base atop a 1-storey keeper's house
- Markings: unpainted white stone tower, white lantern, grey metallic lantern dome
- Power source: mains electricity
- Operator: Marina Militare

Light
- Focal height: 82 metres (269 ft)
- Lens: Type OR 500; Focal length: 250mm
- Intensity: AL 1000 W
- Range: main: 24 nautical miles (44 km; 28 mi) reserve: 18 nautical miles (33 km; 21 mi)
- Characteristic: Fl (3) W 15s.
- Italy no.: 2918 E.F.

Cozzo Spadaro Lighthouse (Italian: Faro di Cozzo Spadaro) is an active lighthouse located at the top of a hill in the Quartiere named Cozzo Spadaro in the municipality of Portopalo di Capo Passero, the southernmost comune of Sicily, on the Ionian Sea.

== Description ==
The lighthouse, built in 1884, consists of a stone octagonal tower, 36 metres (118 ft) high with balcony and lantern, atop a larger octagonal base rising from a 1-storey keeper's house. The tower and the base are of unpainted white stone, the lantern is white and the dome is grey metallic. The light is positioned at 82 metres (269 ft) above sea level and emits three white flashes in a 10 seconds period visible up to a distance of 24 nautical miles (44 km; 28 mi). The lighthouse is completely automated and managed by the Marina Militare with the identification code number 2918 E.F.

== See also ==
- List of lighthouses in Italy
