= Waxholme =

Hamlet in the East Riding of Yorkshire, England

Coordinates: 53.746832°N 0.010893°E

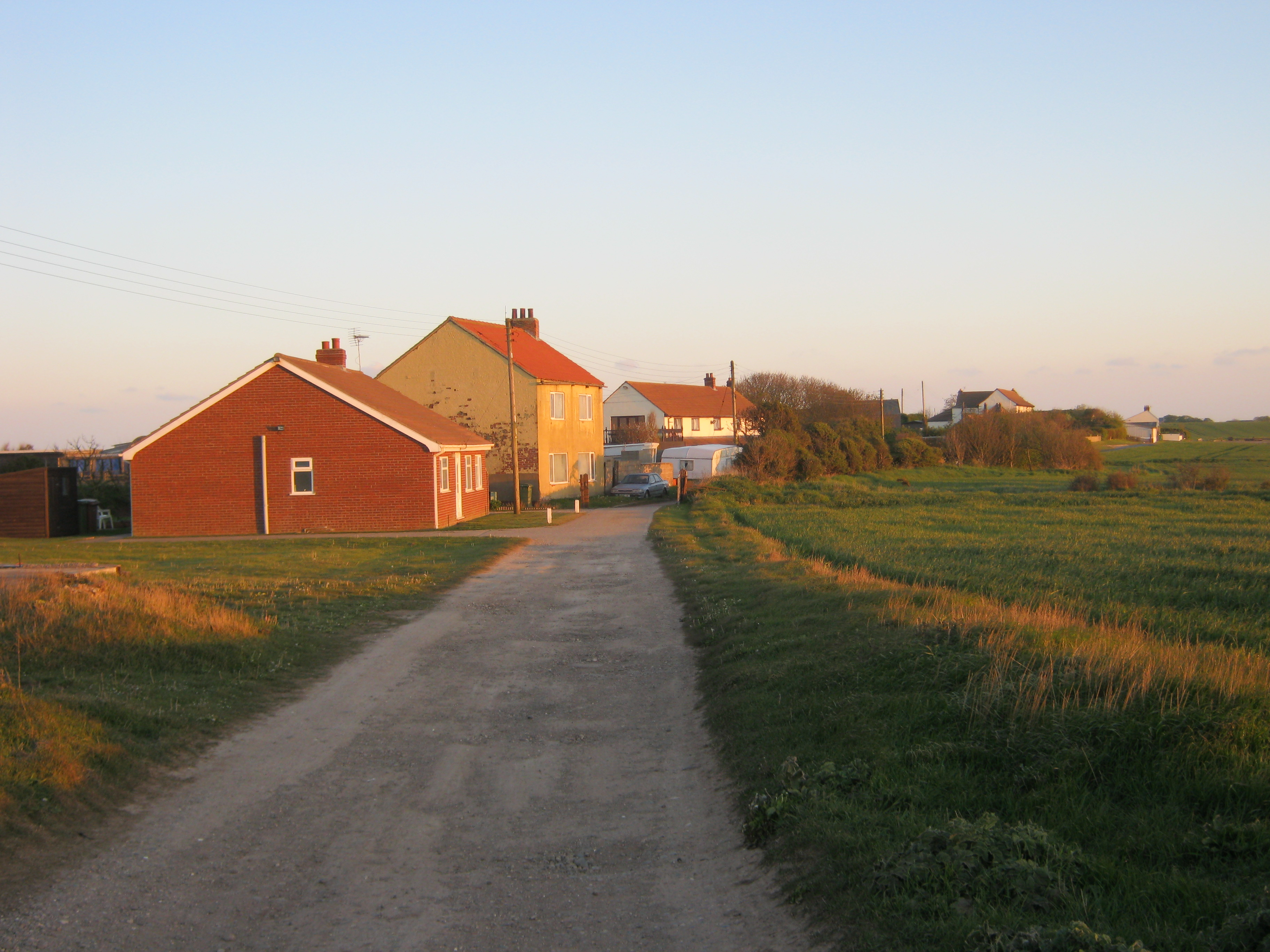

- Location within the East Riding of Yorkshire
- OS grid reference: TA327297
  - London: 155 mi (249 km) S
- Civil parish: Rimswell
- Unitary authority: East Riding of Yorkshire
- Ceremonial county: East Riding of Yorkshire
- Region: Yorkshire and the Humber
- Country: England
- Sovereign state: United Kingdom
- Post town: WITHERNSEA
- Postcode district: HU19
- Dialling code: 01964
- Police: Humberside
- Fire: Humberside
- Ambulance: Yorkshire
- UK Parliament: Beverley and Holderness

Waxholme is a seaside hamlet in the civil parish of Rimswell, in the East Riding of Yorkshire, England. It is situated on the North Sea coast approximately 1 mile (1.6 km) north-west of Withernsea, off the B1242 road.

Waxholme was formerly a township in the parish of Owthorne, in 1866 Waxholme became a separate civil parish, on 1 April 1935 the parish was abolished and merged with Rimswell. In 1931 the parish had a population of 41.

Westermost Rough Wind Farm is situated roughly 8 kilometres (5.0 mi) off the coast.

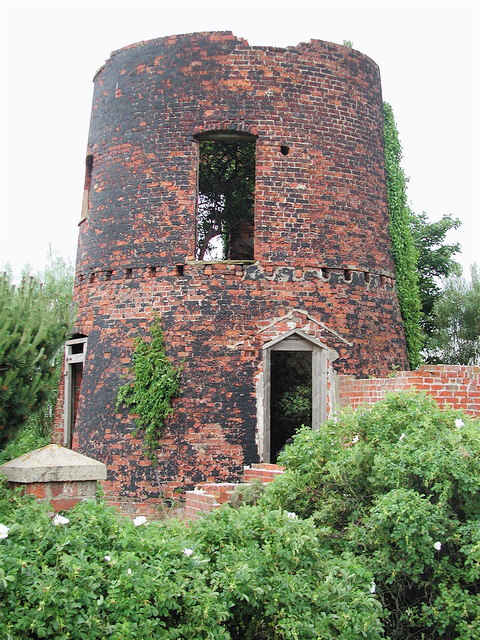
Old windmill at Waxholme

== Etymology ==
Waxholme means "village where wax (from bees) is produced". The first element of the name is Old English weax "wax".

Despite the place-name ending in "-holme" (which is normally from Old Norse holmr "island, water-meadow"), it is not from this word. Instead the ending is Old English ham "homestead", rather than the similar Old English hamm "river-meadow, bend in river", despite the village's proximity to the River Humber. The name was recorded as Wexnem in 1162.

In 1823 inhabitants in the village numbered 72. Occupations included seven farmers.
