= Owthorne =

Former town in the East Riding of Yorkshire, England

Coordinates: 53.737°N 0.022°E

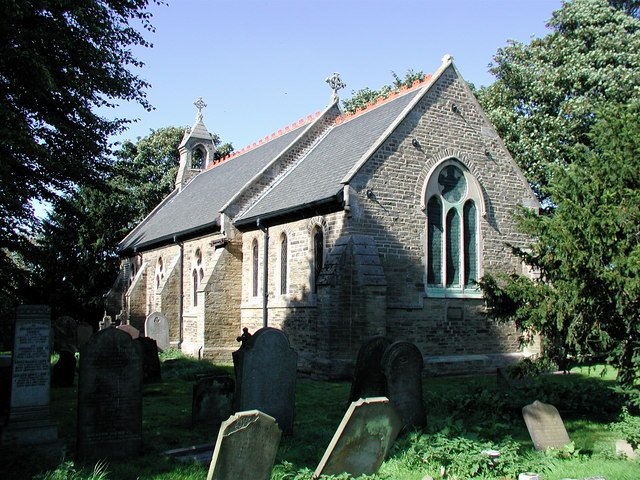

- Location within the East Riding of Yorkshire
- OS grid reference: TA333286
- Civil parish: Withernsea
- Unitary authority: East Riding of Yorkshire
- Ceremonial county: East Riding of Yorkshire
- Region: Yorkshire and the Humber
- Country: England
- Sovereign state: United Kingdom

Owthorne is an area of the town of Withernsea, in the civil parish of Withernsea, on the Holderness coast in the East Riding of Yorkshire, England.

Owthorne was originally a separate town to the north of Withernsea, one of many settlements that have been lost to coastal erosion. Old Withernsea was largely destroyed in the 15th century, making Owthorne the major of the two settlements. However, large parts of it also fell victim to the sea in the 19th century. The church and much of the town were washed away in 1816, and the remainder of the churchyard in 1838. When modern Withernsea expanded, it absorbed the remains of Owthorne in 1891.

The church of Owthorne was dedicated to St Peter. Salvaged stones from its ruin were probably used to build St Mary's Church, Rimswell.

In 1931 the civil parish had a population of 34. On 1 April 1935 the parish was abolished and merged with Hollym and Rimswell.
