= Listed buildings in Fylingdales =

Fylingdales is a civil parish in the county of North Yorkshire, England. It contains over 230 listed buildings that are recorded in the National Heritage List for England. Of these, one is listed at Grade I, the highest of the three grades, four are at Grade II*, the middle grade, and the others are at Grade II, the lowest grade. The parish contains the village of Robin Hood's Bay, the smaller settlements of Fylingthorpe and Raw, and the surrounding countryside. Most of the listed buildings are houses, cottages and associated structures, many crowded together in Robin Hood's Bay. The others include churches and chapels, farmhouses and farm buildings, a hotel and public houses, mile posts, a collecting box, a former pigsty, a museum and a war memorial.

== Key ==
Grade	Criteria
I	Buildings of exceptional interest, sometimes considered to be internationally important
II*	Particularly important buildings of more than special interest
II	Buildings of national importance and special interest

== Buildings ==
Name and location	Photograph	Date	Notes	Grade
Jays House and outbuildings 54.43495°N 0.53589°W		c. 1320	A range including a stable and coach house were added to the house in the 18th century. The building is in sandstone, and has purple slate roofs, with a stone ridge, copings and prominent curved kneelers. The house and the outbuilding each has an L-shaped plan, forming an overall U-shaped plan. The house has two storeys and a front of four bays. The door has a patterned fanlight, and a bracketed cornice hood, to the left is a canted bay window, and the other windows are sashes. The outbuilding has a half-dormer, and a hipped roof with two louvred ridge vents and ball finials.	II
Farsyde House; 54.42604°N 0.53697°W	—	16th century	An entrance extension was added in 1670. The house is in sandstone on a chamfered plinth, and has pantile roofs with a stone ridge, broad copings and rolled kneelers. There are two storeys and attics, and a T-shaped plan, with a rear wing, a main front of three bays, a massive chimney stack on the left, mullioned windows and a dormer. At the rear is a sash window and chamfered mullioned windows. The entrance extension has a blocked window with a moulded surround, and a doorway with a lintel inscribed with three sets of initials.	II*
Cliff Cottage; 54.43152°N 0.53267°W	—	Early 17th century (probable)	A sandstone house, the upper floor partly rendered, with quoins, and a pantile roof with stone copings and kneelers. The main part has two storeys, the upper storey jettied on beams with curved ends, and two bays. There is a two-storey bay to the left, and a single-storey extension. The main part contains a blocked doorway with a chamfered surround, a modern doorway, a casement window and a sash window. The right bay is linked by an enclosed bridge.	II
Fyling Old Hall and wall 54.41203°N 0.54768°W		1629	A house with an earlier origin, it was remodelled in the 1820s, and is in stone, mainly pebbledashed, on a plinth with quoins and some chamfered coping. The roof is in tile with stone copings and kneelers. The house has two storeys and attics, a main front of three bays and a stair tower with a pyramidal roof and a ball finial. The garden front has four bays, and contains a doorway with alternating block jambs, a patterned fanlight, a keystone, a frieze and a hood mould. The windows are sashes with flat heads and keystones. In the right return are mullioned windows with hood moulds, the window in the upper floor is larger with a transom, and in the attic is an oculus. There is a wall round three sides of the garden to the east with wrought iron gates.	II
Brook House Farmhouse and outbuilding 54.43698°N 0.55919°W	—	1632	The farmhouse, which was rebuilt in 1826, is in sandstone on a plinth, and has pantile roofs with a stone ridge and gable copings on block kneelers. There are two storeys, two bays, a single-storey recessed entrance bay on the left, and a single-storey outbuilding with a loft. The doorway has a fanlight, in the left bay is a tripartite window, and the other widows are sashes. The outbuilding has stable doors, other doorways, small windows and a raking loading dormer.	II
Littlewood Cottage; 54.43049°N 0.53317°W		17th century	The cottage was extended in the 19th or 20th century. The lower part of the original building is in stone, the upper part is in brick, the gable end is rendered, and it has a pantile roof. There is one storey, a basement and an attic, and one bay. On the street front is a fixed light and a casement window, and in the left return are two sash windows in the attic and a horizontally-sliding sash below. The extension is in sandstone and is canted. In the very narrow end is a stable door and a small casement window above.	II
Seacote; 54.43179°N 0.53272°W	—	17th century	The house, which has been much altered, is in stone on the ground floor, on a rendered plinth, with rendered timber framing above, and a pantile roof with stone coping and a kneeler on the right. There are two storeys, the upper storey jettied, and one wide bay, curved on the right. On the front is a doorway with a small sash window to the right, and at the top is a small window under the eaves.	II
Sherwood Cottage; 54.43087°N 0.53244°W	—	17th century (possible)	The house has painted incised rendered walls, and a pantile roof. The front is gabled and has two storeys and an attic, and two bays, with a single-bay in the right return. In the ground floor are two small-pane fixed-light windows, the upper floor has a casement window on the left and a sash window on the right, and in the attic is a casement. The doorway is in the right return and has a bracketed cornice, and to the right is a shopfront.	II
St Stephen's Bede House and The Crypt; 54.43181°N 0.53339°W	—	17th century	A house with the ground floor forming a separate dwelling, in sandstone with a pantile roof, stone copings and kneelers. There are three storeys and three irregular bays. In the ground floor is a doorway with a small window to the left, and to the right is a fire window ornamented as a grotto. The upper floors contain fires windows, and small modern windows, and there is a small horizontally-sliding sash window. In the left return is a doorway with a gabled head on long brackets.	II
Whitegates; 54.43130°N 0.53262°W	—	17th century	The house is in sandstone, the north front with incised rendering, and it has a pantile roof with stone curved coping and a kneeler on the right. The entrance front has two storeys, an attic and a tall basement. In the basement is a door and a fixed light, and on the left is a weatherboarded porch. Also on the front is a sash window and a dormer, and elsewhere are sash windows.	II
Lilly's Cottage; 54.43141°N 0.53310°W	—	Mid to late 17th century	A house and shop in rendered stone on a plinth, with moulded eaves coping. There are two storeys and an attic, and one wide bay, with the gable end facing the street. In the ground floor is a doorway with a bracketed gabled hood, to the right is a transomed shop window, and the upper floors contain sash windows.	II
Bay Ness Old Farmhouse; 54.44239°N 0.53127°W	—	Late 17th century (probable)	The farmhouse, later used for other purposes, is in sandstone on a plinth, with a pantile roof and some tiles, a stone ridge, copings and kneelers. There is one storey and an attic, and an L-shaped plan, with a main range of three bays and a rear wing. On the front is a stable door, and the windows are a mix, some chamfered and mullioned and others are casements.	II
Bramblewick Cafe; 54.43048°N 0.53253°W		Late 17th century (probable)	The building has a rendered front, and a pantile roof with stone coping. The front facing the road is gabled, the main part has three storeys and an attic, and one wide bay, and to the left is an extension with two storeys and an attic. In the ground floor is a doorway and a shop window, and elsewhere are various modern windows.	II
Dock Cottage; 54.43041°N 0.53244°W		Late 17th century	The house has incised rendered walls, and a pantile roof with stone copings and kneelers. There are two storeys, a basement and an attic, and a gabled main front. In each floor is a sash window, that in the upper floor flanked by roundels. Steps with a wrought iron handrail lead up to a doorway in a porch extension to the right. The left return is canted, and contains a basement doorway and a round window.	II
Green Cottage and Summer Cottage; 54.43084°N 0.53271°W	—	Late 17th century (probable)	A house divided into two, in large stone blocks, with a pantile roof, stone copings and kneelers. There are two storeys and an attic, a basement on the left, and an L-shaped plan with a front of three bays. The right cottage has a doorway with a segmental-arched lintel, the left cottage has a wooden architrave, and the windows are sashes.	II
Rokeby House; 54.43184°N 0.53277°W	—	Late 17th century (probable)	The house has incised rendered walls, and a pantile roof with rendered copings and stone kneelers. On the front are two storeys and two very wide bays. In the centre is a doorway with a hood on full-length brackets. The windows are paired pivoted casements, those in the upper floor in architraves, and there are attic half-dormers. At the rear is one storey and an attic.	II
The Old Forge; 54.43067°N 0.53268°W	—	Late 17th century	A house with a shopfront added in the 20th century, it has a rendered front, and a pantile roof with stone copings and curved kneelers. The gable end faces the street, there are three storeys and an attic, and two bays. The ground floor contains a full-width shopfront with a central recessed doorway, and above is a balcony with a wood rail, and sash windows. There are steps and sash windows on the right return.	II
Thorpe Hall; 54.43112°N 0.54641°W		1680	A large house that was extended in the 19th century, in sandstone with quoins, and a Welsh slate roof with stone copings, small gabled kneelers, stone ridges on the older part and tile ridges on the extensions. The original part has two parallel ranges, the 1835 extension is parallel and extended to the south with a porch, and the 1844 extension is a parallel east range linked to the porch. There are two storeys and attics, and an entrance front of three bays, with string courses, and a small central gable with a chamfered slit. In the centre is a doorway with a Tudor arched head, a chamfered surround, and a coat of arms with initials and the date. Above it is a single-light window, and the other windows on the front are double-chamfered and mullioned. Elsewhere, there are more Tudor-arched doorways and coats of arms.	II
Bank House and Bank House Cottage; 54.43064°N 0.53247°W	—	c. 1700	The oldest part is the rear wing, with the front range dating from the early 19th century. The building is in sandstone, with pantile roofs, stone coping and kneelers. The front has two storeys and an attic and one wide bay, and the rear wing has two storeys and four bays. The doorway is on the right, the windows are sashes and there is a small skylight.	II
Eva Cottage; 54.43102°N 0.53258°W		c. 1700	The house is in sandstone, with coved eaves, and a pantile roof with stone coping and a kneeler on the right. There are two storeys and an attic, and one bay. On the left is a doorway with a bracketed gabled hood, to the right is a sash window in an architrave, and above is a horizontally-sliding sash window. To the right is an added rendered bay with a passage entry.	II
House south of Fisherman's Cottage; 54.43081°N 0.53293°W	—	c. 1700	The house is in sandstone, the basement is rendered, and it has a pantile roof with stone kneelers. The gable end faces the road, and has three storeys, a basement, and two bays. The entrance is in the left return of the basement, and has reeded pilasters, a shaped and initialled lintel, and an open pedimented hood. Most of the windows are sashes, there is one casement window in an old chamfered surround, and a large fixed window.	II
Fulmar Cottage; 54.40830°N 0.52807°W	—	c. 1700	The house is in sandstone on an older plinth, and it has a pantile roof with a stone ridge, copings and block kneelers. There is a single storey and an attic, three bays, and lower outbuildings to the west. The doorway is slightly chamfered, most of the windows are casements, there is a fire window, and raking dormers. In the outbuilding is a mullioned window, and inside the house is a large inglenook fireplace.	II
High Normanby Old Farmhouse and byre 54.44093°N 0.56396°W		c. 1700	The farmhouse is in sandstone, and has a pantile roof with a stone ridge, copings and kneelers. There is one storey and an attic, and two wide bays, with an added bay on the right. On the front are two doors, a blocked doorway flanked by multipane windows with central opening sections, a blocked mullioned window and a blocked fire window, and two raking dormers. The projecting byre range has one storey and five bays, and contains blocked doors and small windows.	II
Maid Marian; 54.43189°N 0.53359°W	—	c. 1700	The house is in sandstone with a pantile roof. There are two storeys and an attic, and two bays. In the ground floor is a blocked doorway and an inserted lower doorway, the upper floor contains a fire window with a fixed light, and a modern casement window, and there is a dormer on the left.	II
Raw Farmhouse and outbuilding 54.43802°N 0.56127°W	—	c. 1700	A longhouse consisting of a farmhouse and an integral barn and byre. It is in sandstone, and has a pantile roof with a stone ridge, coping and kneelers. There are two storeys and an attic, and it contains a doorway with a heavy chamfered lintel, and casement windows and a fire window with chamfered surrounds, and between them is a stair window. At the rear are stable doors and slit vents, and in the extension is a segmental-arched cart entrance.	II
Stable and byre north of Bay Ness Old Farmhouse; 54.44256°N 0.53137°W	—	Late 17th to early 18th century	The building is in sandstone with a pantile roof and stone copings. There is one storey and five bays, with a gable on the return of the left bay. It contains stable doors with heavy lintels and a landing door, and at the rear are two raking dormers. Inside, there is an upper cruck truss.	II
Bow Cottage; 54.43102°N 0.53260°W		Late 17th to early 18th century	A sandstone house with coved eaves, and a pantile roof with coping and a kneeler on the left. There are two storeys and an attic, and two bays. In the centre is a doorway with a fanlight flanked by bow windows, all under a continuous flat hood on prominent brackets. The upper floor contains sash windows, and above are two dormers.	II
Coralline; 54.43179°N 0.53304°W	—	Late 17th or early 18th century	Two houses, later joined, in sandstone, with a pantile roof, a stone ridge, copings and kneelers. There are two storeys and an attic, and three bays. In the right two bays is a segmental-headed doorway under a segmental-headed lintel with a keystone. To its right is a sash window, to the left is a tripartite window, and above are sash windows and a dormer. The left bay has a plinth and a casement window, above which is a sash window and a dormer.	II
King's Head Cottages; 54.43057°N 0.53260°W	—	Late 17th or early 18th century	A house later divided into two, it has incised rendered walls, and a pantile roof with stone coping. The gable end faces the road, and to the left is an almost full height outshut. There are two storeys, an attic and a basement. In the basement is a door, steps lead up to another doorway, and the windows are sashes.	II
Moorsons House; 54.43140°N 0.53277°W	—	Late 17th or early 18th century	A sandstone house, the right return rendered, with a pantile roof, a stone ridge, copings and kneelers. There are two storeys and an attic, and three irregular bays. The doorway is dated 1630, and has a gabled hood on decorative brackets. To its right is a small casement window, and to the left is an 18-pane window. The upper floors contain sash windows, and there is a flat-roofed dormer. The right return is gabled, and contains a doorway with a bracketed gabled hood.	II
Endways; 54.43177°N 0.53295°W	—	1709	The house is in sandstone, and has a pantile roof with a stone ridge, copings and kneelers. There are two storeys and three bays. On the front is an inserted doorway, and a blocked doorway with an initialled and dated lintel. On the right is a 24-light window, and elsewhere are a fire window, a sash window, a horizontally-sliding sash window and a dormer.	II
Holme Dale and Sunny Vale; 54.43182°N 0.53437°W	—	1709–10	The left of the two houses was added later in the 17th century. They are in sandstone, and have a pantile roof with a stone ridge, copings, and kneelers of different patterns. Each house has three storeys and one wide bay, The right house has a doorway with a gabled bracketed hood, The left house has an inscribed stone, and the windows in both houses are sashes.	II
Mariners and forecourt wall 54.43191°N 0.53283°W		1713	A public house, later a private house, in sandstone, with a pantile roof, and a stone ridge, copings, and kneelers. There are two storeys and attics, and one wide bay. In the ground floor is a doorway with a dentilled surround and a gabled hood with a lantern, and to the right is a shop window. The upper floor contains sash windows in architraves, and in the attic is a horizontally-sliding sash. The forecourt wall enclosing the front garden is about 2 feet (0.61 m) high and has flat coping.	II
Park Gate and barn 54.42816°N 0.55597°W	—	1715	The farmhouse, later a private house, and the barn are in sandstone with pantile roofs, stone copings and kneelers. The house has two storeys and five bays, and at the rear is a dairy extension and a barn. On the front is a central gabled porch, and above the door are initials and the date. Throughout, there are two-light chamfered mullioned windows with casements. At the rear are stair and cellar windows.	II
3 Chapel Street; 54.43147°N 0.53319°W		Early 18th century (probable)	A stone house in a terrace, with coved eaves, and a pantile roof with stone coping and a kneeler on the right. There are two storeys and an attic, and one bay. On the left is a doorway with a bracketed gabled hood, the windows are sashes and in the attic is a dormer.	II
6 Littlewood Terrace; 54.43045°N 0.53320°W	—	Early 18th century (probable)	A house in two parts, the left part is rendered on stone and brick, and the right part is in sandstone. The roofs are in pantile with stone copings and kneelers. The left part has two storeys and attics, and two bays, and it contains a doorway, sash windows and a dormer. The right part is recessed and lower, with one storey and a basement, and two bays. Steps lead down to the cellar door, and the windows are sashes.	II
Cockpit Cottage and Arts, Crafts and Books; 54.43186°N 0.53390°W		Early 18th century	Two houses, one with a shop, in sandstone with Welsh slate roofs. There is an L-shaped plan, with two gabled bays facing the street. The left bay has two storeys and an attic, steps lead up to a doorway with a shop window on the left, and above is a sash window and a small attic casement window. In the right bay is a doorway and a sash window, above which is a large canted oriel window, and on the apex of the gable is a ball finial. Cockpit Cottage is recessed on the left, and has two storeys and one wide bay.	II
Ben Marie; 54.43059°N 0.53341°W	—	Early 18th century (possible)	The house is in sandstone, partly rendered, with a pantile roof and stone copings. There are two storeys at the front, one at the rear, two wide bays, and a small outhouse on the right. The doorway has a wooden hood on brackets, and the windows have been altered.	II
Birkby Cottage; 54.43148°N 0.53325°W	—	Early 18th century (probable)	A sandstone house, part of a terrace, with coved eaves, and a pantile roof with stone gable copings, and large moulded kneelers. There are two storeys and an attic, and two bays. The doorway has a gabled hood on long brackets, there is a blocked fire window, the other windows are sashes, and there is a three-light dormer with casements.	II
Brow Cot and Brow Hill Cottage; 54.40581°N 0.51496°W	—	Early 18th century	The house and cottage are in sandstone with pantile roofs. Each part has two storeys and two bays, the house wider. The house has quoins, wide gable copings, and moulded kneelers. In the centre are double doors, and the windows are casements, those in the upper floor with mullions. The ground floor openings in the cottage have lintels with keystones, and in the upper floor are small sash windows.	II
Browside Farmhouse and outbuilding 54.40879°N 0.53240°W		Early 18th century	The farmhouse is in sandstone, and has a pantile roof with a stone ridge, coping and kneelers. The house has two storeys and four bays, to the right is a recessed wing with one storey and a loft and one bay, and to the left is a recessed outbuilding with one storey and a loft and two wide bays. The main house has a central doorway with a fanlight, sash windows and coved eaves. The right wing contains a mullioned window in the ground floor and a horizontally-sliding sash above. In the outbuilding is a loft door is a half-dormer.	II
Burton House and Cliff Heads; 54.43099°N 0.53246°W		Early 18th century	A house divided into two, in sandstone, the right return rendered, with quoins, a floor band, coved eaves, and a pantile roof with gable copings and square kneelers. There are two storeys and a basement and four bays. The doorways are in the centre, each with a bracketed hood. To the left is a basement opening with a chamfered surround, and a horizontally-sliding sash window in a well, and the windows elsewhere are sashes.	II
Chiltern and Stormville; 54.43055°N 0.53312°W	—	Early 18th century (possible)	A house divided into two, in sandstone, the right house with incised rendering, and both with coved eaves, and pantile roofs with stone coping and kneelers. There are two storeys, an attic and a basement, and each house has one bay. Steps lead up to paired doorways in the centre. The right house has a mullioned window in the ground floor, and a canted oriel window with a cornice and a lead roof in the upper floor. The left house has an extension with a doorway, and casement windows. Both houses have dormers with paired sashes and a deep bracketed soffit.	II
Cook House and outbuildings 54.39326°N 0.54670°W	—	Early 18th century (possible)	The farmhouse is in sandstone, with stepped eaves, and a pantile roof with a tile ridge, stone copings and block kneelers. There is one storey and an attic, two bays, and a rear wing. On the front is a porch, a small sash window and a six-pane window. To the right is an outbuilding on a boulder plinth, containing three stable doors, and a low single-storey outbuilding projects to the left.	II
Eve Cottage; 54.43125°N 0.53260°W	—	Early 18th century	The house is in sandstone, with coved eaves, and stone coping and kneelers. The east front has two storeys and an attic and two bays, and the south front and sea fronts each have three storeys and two bays. The windows are a mix, and include sashes, some horizontally sliding, casements and a fire window. On the south front are end pilasters and a parapet with ball finials.	II
Fenay Cottage and Ravensworth Cottage; 54.43166°N 0.53318°W	—	Early 18th century (probable)	A pair of houses in sandstone, with a pantile roof, stone copings and kneelers. There are two storeys and attics, and each house has two bays. The doorways are paired in the centre, the left doorway has a bracketed gabled hood with a painting in the tympanum, and the right doorway has pilasters and an entablature. Both houses contain sash windows and dormers, and the right house also has a large 24-pane window.	II
Foulsyke House; 54.40901°N 0.59461°W	—	Early 18th century (probable)	A farmhouse in sandstone and in two parts. The lower downhouse has two storeys, one bay, and a tile roof. On the front is a doorway and a fixed light, and two small casements above, and at the rear are horizontally-sliding sashes and casements above. The main house has one storey and attics and two wide bays, and a Welsh slate roof with a stone ridge, copings and curved kneelers. On the front are a doorway, modern windows, a stair window, and dormers with casements, and at the rear are tripartite windows, and three dormers with sashes. Inside the main house is an inglenook fireplace.	II
Gallery Cottage and 2 Martin's Row; 54.43194°N 0.53360°W	—	Early 18th century	Two houses in sandstone with a pantile roof. There are two storeys and three bays. In the centre are paired doorways, the left blocked, flanked by horizontally-sliding sash windows. The other doorway is in the upper floor and is approached by steps and a bridge. On the left of this are casement windows and to the right is a small sash. In the roof, to the left, is a large dormer.	II
Guides Cottage and The Retreat; 54.43037°N 0.53290°W	—	Early 18th century	Two houses in sandstone, with quoins, and a pantile roof with stone copings and small curved kneelers. There are two storeys and an attic, and three bays. The windows are sashes, and there is a raking dormer. In the left return is a doorway with a chamfered and alternating block surround, and a heavy lintel.	II
Hillcot; 54.43054°N 0.53340°W	—	Early 18th century	A cottage in incised rendering on sandstone, with a pantile roof, stone coping and a curved kneeler. There is one storey, an attic and a basement, and a small right extension. The doorway is in the basement, most of the windows are sashes, and in the extension is a casement window.	II
Ladysmith Farmhouse and outbuildings 54.40872°N 0.53179°W	—	Early 18th century	The farmhouse, which has been extended, and the outbuildings, are in sandstone and have pantile roofs with a stone ridge, coping and kneelers. The downhouse and the house each has two storeys and two bays, and the windows are a mix of mullioned windows, horizontally-sliding sashes and a casement. The outbuilding has one storey and a loft, and at the rear is a pigsty with four blocked feeding chutes.	II
Peacock Cottage; 54.43098°N 0.53313°W		Early 18th century	The house is in sandstone on a plinth, with coved eaves, and a pantile roof with stone coping and large kneelers. There are two storeys and two bays. The doorway has a flat bracketed hood, and to its right is a bootscraper recess. The windows are sashes, and in the upper floor is a panel containing a sundial.	II
Roseberry Cottage; 54.43137°N 0.53317°W	—	Early 18th century (possible)	The house is in sandstone, the front in incised render, with a pantile roof, and a stone ridge, copings and kneelers. There are two storeys on the front and two irregular bays. On the left is a doorway with a gabled bracketed hood, on the right is a boarded passage door, and in the upper floor is a sash window. The left return contains two attic sashes.	II
Sherwood; 54.43194°N 0.53308°W		Early 18th century	The house is in sandstone, and has a pantile roof with a stone ridge, copings and kneelers. There are two storeys and an attic, and three bays. The doorway has pilasters, a radial fanlight and an archivolt. The windows are sashes in architraves, and there is a large dormer.	II
Shirley House; 54.43162°N 0.53307°W	—	Early 18th century	The house, possibly with an earlier core, is in sandstone with a pantile roof. There are two storeys, an attic and a basement, and two bays. Five steps with a wooden handrail lead up to a doorway with a gabled hood on decorative brackets. To the left is a basement door and a window. The windows in the ground and upper floors are sashes, and there is a modern dormer with a small-paned casement.	II
Staithe Cottage; 54.43082°N 0.53258°W	—	Early 18th century or earlier	The house has incised rendered walls, stepped eaves, and a pantile roof with a stone ridge, copings and kneelers. There are two storeys and one bay. The doorway on the right has a gabled bracketed hood, and the windows are sashes, one horizontally-sliding.	II
Storm Cottage; 54.43068°N 0.53309°W	—	Early 18th century	The house is in stone with incised render at the rear, coved eaves, and a pantile roof with a stone ridge, copings, and prominent moulded kneelers. On the front are two storeys and two irregular bays. On the left is a doorway with a gabled hood on shaped brackets, and the windows are sashes in architraves. At the rear is one storey and an attic, a doorway, small windows and a raking dormer.	II
Sunnyside Farmhouse and outbuilding 54.42758°N 0.55614°W		Early 18th century	The buildings are in sandstone, with pantile roofs, stone ridges, copings and block kneelers. The main house and downhouse have plinths and two storeys. On the front is a porch, the main house contains tripartite windows, and in the downhouse are sashes, all but one horizontally-sliding. The outbuilding has one storey and a loft, and five bays, the central barn flanked by byres and stables. The openings include doorways, stable doors, a loading door, a casement window and slit vents.	II
Formerly The Anchorage; 54.43068°N 0.53268°W		Early 18th century	A house, formerly incorporating a shop, in sandstone, with a coved eaves course and a parapet. There are three storeys, a basement and an attic, and three narrow bays. In the basement is a doorway, and steps with a wrought iron handrail lead up to an entrance terrace and doorway. The windows are sashes, and in the attic are two wide three-light windows. At the rear is a doorway with a gabled bracketed hood and a modern window.	II
The Laurel Inn; 54.43189°N 0.53357°W		Early 18th century	The public house was extended to the west in the 19th century. The older part has incised rendered walls, and the newer part is in sandstone. The roof is in pantile with stone copings and kneelers. The older part has three storeys and its gable end facing the road. The newer part has four storeys and one bay, and it contains a projecting porch. The windows in both parts are sashes, some of them horizontally-sliding.	II
Woodside; 54.43038°N 0.53353°W	—	Early 18th century (probable)	The house is in sandstone, and has a pantile roof with stone coping on the left with block kneelers. There are two storeys and an attic, and two narrow bays. On the left is a small gabled porch, to its right is a 20th-century window, above are sash windows, and in the roof is a dormer. The left return has a porch, a modern window and a sash window, and at the rear is a blocked fire window.	II
Ramsdale Cottage; 54.42065°N 0.57388°W	—	1726	The house, which was later extended, is in sandstone, and has a pantile roof with stone copings and kneelers. There is one storey and an attic, four bays, and a rear wing on the right. The doorway is in the left bay, to its left is a casement window, to its right is a fire window with an initialled and dated lintel, and further to the right are three tripartite windows. The upper floor contains five sash windows, and inside the house is an inglenook fireplace.	II
Odinsfield; 54.43181°N 0.53295°W	—	1734	The house has incised rendered walls, and a pantile roof with a stone ridge, copings and kneelers, the right kneeler curved. There are two storeys and two irregular bays. The doorway has a dated and initialled lintel and a bracketed hood, and the windows are sashes in architraves. The left return has a basement, and contains a doorway and a variety of windows.	II
1 and 2 Cliffroyd; 54.43017°N 0.53261°W	—	Early to mid 18th century	A pair of houses in a terrace, in rendered stone, with a coved eaves course and pantile roofs. There are three storeys, and each house has one bay. On the front are two doorways, the right one with a fanlight, and the windows are sashes. At the rear is a gabled bay with a stable door.	II
1, 2 and 3 Ocean View; 54.43015°N 0.53247°W		Early to mid 18th century	A house in a terrace, divided into three, in rendered stone, with a coved eaves course, and a pantile roof with a stone ridge, copings, and large curved kneelers. The main block has three storeys and attics, and four bays. On the front are two doorways, and the windows are sashes. In the attics are three dormers, the outer ones with flat roofs, and the middle one gabled with bargeboards. To the left is a lower wing with two storeys and two bays.	II
Colcroft; 54.40691°N 0.55681°W		Early to mid 18th century	The farmhouse is in sandstone and has a Welsh slate roof with a stone ridge, coping and a block kneeler. There is one storey and an attic and two bays, and a lower wide bay. The farmhouse contains a two-light mullioned window, a stair window and a fire window, and the other windows are later casements.	II
Ebor Cottage and West Lea; 54.43122°N 0.53282°W		Early to mid 18th century	A house divided into two, in sandstone, with coved eaves, and a pantile roof with a large curved kneeler. There are two storeys and three bays. The doorways are paired, both have blocked fanlight s, one with a bracketed cornice, and the other with a ball-bordered serpentine hood on full-length reeded brackets. The windows in Ebor Cottage are sashes, and in West Lea they are casements. At the rear is a mullioned window.	II
Fielding's Shop and Leaf's Shop; 54.43179°N 0.53372°W		Early to mid 18th century	A house and shops in sandstone, with a coved eaves course, and a pantile roof with a stone ridge. There are two storeys and an attic, and four narrow bays. The building contains a shop window, a shop front, sash windows, some of them horizontally-sliding, and two dormers.	II
Greenwood Cottage; 54.43056°N 0.53345°W	—	Early to mid 18th century	The house is in sandstone, and has a pantile roof with a stone ridge. There are two storeys and two irregular bays. The doorway has a bracketed quasi-cornice, most of the windows are sashes, there is one small casement window and a wide roof dormer.	II
Hensingham; 54.43134°N 0.53296°W	—	Early to mid 18th century (probable)	The house is in sandstone on a plinth, with coved eaves and a pantile roof. There are two storeys and an attic, and three irregular bays. The doorway has a reeded frame, a blocked radial fanlight, and a dentilled pedimented hood on curved brackets, and to its right is a cast iron bootscraper. The windows are sashes, those in the ground floor in wooden architraves, and there are two flat-headed dormers.	II
Hillcliffe and walls 54.43200°N 0.53285°W	—	Early to mid 18th century	The house has incised rendered walls, and pantile roofs with stone copings. There are two storeys, two irregular bays, and a canted single-bay extension on the left. The doorway has an architrave with a keystone, and the windows are sashes with circular keystones. On the seaward side is a tall retaining wall enclosing a small garden, and the forecourt wall enclosing the front garden is about 2 feet (0.61 m) high, with flat coping.	II
Millbank Farmhouse and outbuilding 54.42085°N 0.53520°W		Early to mid 18th century (probable)	The farmhouse and outbuilding are in sandstone, the larger low end has a pantile roof, and the upper end has a Welsh slate roof, both with a stone ridge, copings and kneelers. The is one storey and attics, and both the main house and the downhouse have two bays. On the front are doorways and casement windows, and at the rear are doorways, a horizontally-sliding sash window and slit vents.	II
Red Brae; 54.43155°N 0.53305°W	—	Early to mid 18th century	A house at a street junction with flat-iron plan, two storeys and one wide bay. It is in sandstone with a pantile roof, stone copings and a block kneeler on the left. The doorway has a bracketed cornice hood, on the corner are sash windows, there are small windows at the rear, and a roof dormer.	II
Rosslyn House and The Little Shop; 54.43039°N 0.54812°W	—	Early to mid 18th century	A house with a shop in sandstone, with a pantile roof, and a stone ridge, copings and kneelers. There are two storeys and three bays, and an outhouse to the right. To the left are paired doorways with pilasters and a shallow bracketed hood, and to the right is a square shop bay window. The upper floor contains three two-light chamfered mullioned windows, and above the left doorway is the relief of a ship.	II
Sharrowhead; 54.43040°N 0.53298°W	—	Early to mid 18th century	The house is in sandstone, and has a pantile roof with copings and a kneeler. There are two storeys and a basement, and one bay. In the ground floor is a fixed window with a central opening section, the upper floor contains a sash window, and the entrance is at the rear.	II
Wesley Cottage; 54.43183°N 0.53300°W		Early to mid 18th century	The house is in sandstone, and has a pantile roof with a stone ridge, copings and prominent kneelers. There are two storeys and an attic, and two irregular bays. The doorway on the left has a bracketed wooden hood on a heavy lintel, and the windows are sashes. To the right is a shed with a window and a door, and a plaque depicting the head of John Wesley.	II
Merrymen; 54.43096°N 0.53262°W		1737	The house is in sandstone, with moulded eaves, and a pantile roof with shaped copings and curved kneelers. There are two storeys and a front of one wide bay. The doorway has a heavy dated and initialled lintel and a gabled bracketed hood. In the left return is a casement window. The right return is gabled, with incised rendering, two storeys, an attic and a basement, and two bays. It contains sash windows, and in the basement is a horizontally-sliding sash.	II
Middlewood Farmhouse; 54.42779°N 0.54511°W	—	1739	The farmhouse is in sandstone on a plinth, and has a pantile roof with a stone ridge, copings and kneelers. There are two storeys and a basement, three bays, and a lower single-bay extension on the right. Steps lead up to an arched doorway with a moulded surround, above which is a datestone. There are various openings in the basement, and above are sash windows in architraves in moulded reveals.	II
Avery House and Osborne Cottage; 54.43063°N 0.53299°W	—	Mid 18th century (probable)	A pair of cottages in incised render on stone, with a moulded eaves cornice, and a pantile roof with stone coping and kneelers. There are two storeys and each cottage has one wide bay. The left cottage has a doorway with a bracketed cornice hood, and the right cottage has a bracketed pedimented hood. The windows are a mix of sashes and casements, and there is an attic dormer.	II
Bay Cottage; 54.43105°N 0.53269°W	—	18th century (possible)	The house is in incised render with a pantile roof. There are two storeys and an attic, one wide bay, and a narrow canted bay. The doorway has a bracketed gabled hood with bargeboards. The windows are sashes, there is a dormer, and in the narrow bay is a tiny bow window.	II
Beachholme; 54.43006°N 0.53222°W		18th century (possible)	The house is in sandstone, and has a pantile roof with stone copings and kneelers. The south front has three storeys and an attic, and three bays. In the ground floor is a doorway and casement windows, one transomed, and the middle floor has a full-length wooden balcony, and a central doorway flanked by square oriel windows with tile roofs. The top floor contains transomed windows, and the attic has two flat-roofed dormers. In the left return is a gabled porch.	II
Boundary stone^{A} 54.42275°N 0.60736°W		18th century	The boundary stone on the south side of the B1416 road consists of a sandstone monolith. It is about 0.6 metres (2 ft 0 in) high with a rounded top, and the east side is inscribed "C XI C".	II
Bronte Cottage; 54.43069°N 0.53258°W	—	Mid 18th century (probable)	A small sandstone house with a pantile roof, two storeys and an attic, and two narrow bays. In the centre is a doorway, the left bay contains sash windows, the right bay casement windows, and in the attic is a four-light dormer.	II
Brudenell Cottage and Cramford; 54.43138°N 0.53304°W		Mid 18th century	A house divided into two, in sandstone, with coved eaves, and a pantile roof with large curved kneelers. There are two storeys and two bays. The doorways are paired in the centre under flat hoods on long brackets. The windows are sashes, one with a moulded surround.	II
Friars Cottage; 54.43154°N 0.53282°W	—	Mid 18th century	The house is in sandstone, and has a pantile roof with stone coping on the left. There are two storeys and an attic, and two wide bays. The central doorway has a gabled wooden hood on decorative brackets, the ground floor windows are sash windows, in the upper floor are four casements and there is a three-light dormer.	II
Walls south of Ladysmith Farmhouse; 54.40859°N 0.53169°W	—	18th century	The walls consist of big blocks of roughly-squared sandstone with heavy flat slab coping. They run in a curve around the garden to the south of the farmhouse.	II
Georgian House and house to left 54.43073°N 0.53237°W	—	Mid 18th century	A pair of brick houses on a stone plinth with stone dressings, alternating quoins, a sill band, an eaves cornice, and a pantile roof. There are three storeys and four bays. The doorways are paired in the centre, and have pilasters, blocked fanlights, and a modillion cornice on brackets. To the right is a casement window, and the other windows are sashes with gauged-brick arches and keystones, those in the top floor horizontally-sliding.	II
Little John Cottage; 54.43201°N 0.53303°W	—	Mid 18th century	The house is rendered and has a pantile roof. There are two storeys and an attic, two wide bays, and a narrow bay on the left. The doorway has a gabled wood hood, the windows are sashes, there is a small chamfered fire window, and there are two square-headed dormers.	II
Little John House; 54.43049°N 0.53277°W		18th century	The house is in sandstone on a plinth, and has a pantile roof with flat stone gable copings and rolled kneelers. There are three storeys and one wide bay. The gabled front faces the street, and the left return is canted. On the front, to the right, steps lead up to a recessed doorway, to its left is a sash window and above is a horizontally-sliding sash window., and there are similar windows on the left return.	II
Meadow Croft; 54.43129°N 0.53288°W	—	Mid 18th century (probable)	The house is in stone, with coved eaves, and a pantile roof with large kneelers. There are two storeys and attics, and three bays. The doorway has a bracketed cornice, the windows are sashes, and there is a three-light dormer.	II
Men's Institute; 54.43058°N 0.53249°W		18th century	The building is in stone, and has a pantile roof with stone copings and kneelers. There are two storeys and a cellar, and three bays. The doorway has a fanlight, the windows are sashes with extended lintels and keystones, and there are two small cellar openings.	II
Oak Tree House and Oak Dene; 54.43151°N 0.54696°W	—	Mid 18th century	Two houses in sandstone, with a roof partly in pantile and partly in Welsh slate, with a stone ridge, copings, and a kneeler on the right. Oak Tree House on the left has two storeys and two narrow bays. It contains a doorway with a gabled hood on long shaped brackets, and the windows are sashes. Oak Dene has two storeys and two wide bays, The central doorway has a fanlight and an extended lintel with a keystone. The windows are tripartite sashes, those in the right bay with extended lintels and keystones.	II
Outhouse opposite Traycliffe; 54.43030°N 0.53281°W	—	18th century	The outhouse is in sandstone and has a pantile roof. There is one storey, a loft and a basement, and one bay. The gabled end faces the road and contains a doorway. In the right return is a casement window, a fixed light above, and two small basement windows. The left return contains a basement door.	II
Primrose Cottage; 54.43085°N 0.53270°W	—	Mid 18th century (probable)	The house is in sandstone, and has a pantile roof with a stone ridge, copings and small kneelers. There are two storeys and two bays. In the ground floor is a doorway on the left, and the upper floor contains a small modern window on the left, and a horizontally-sliding sash window on the right.	II
Ramsdale South Farmhouse, outbuildings and wall 54.41828°N 0.57376°W	—	18th century (possible)	The outbuildings are the older part, with the farmhouse dating from the early 19th century. The buildings are in sandstone and have pantile roofs with a stone ridge and copings. The farmhouse has two storeys, three wide bays, and large curved kneelers, and it contains a central doorway and sash windows. To the left is a single-storey two-bay outhouse, and to the right is a barn with one storey, a loft and four bays. It has stepped eaves, block kneelers, and contains stable doors, a loft door, and slit vents. To the front is a wall with half-round coping, containing two pairs of monolith gate piers.	II
Resthaven; 54.43203°N 0.53311°W	—	18th century	An outbuilding converted into a cottage, it is in sandstone on a plinth, and has a pantile roof with stone coping and kneelers. There are two storeys and attics, and two bays. On the right is a doorway, and to its right is a pivoted casement window. The upper floor contains a sash window and a fixed window, and in the roof are two flat-headed dormers.	II
St Stephen's Vicarage; 54.43380°N 0.53807°W	—	Mid 18th century	A farmhouse, later a vicarage, it was extended in the 20th century. It is in sandstone, partly rendered, with a Welsh slate roof. There are two storeys and an L-shaped plan, with a main range of three bays, and a north wing on the left. The middle bay of the main range projects and is gabled, and contains a doorway with a fanlight and a pedimented hood on brackets. This is flanked by canted bay windows, and in the upper floor are sash windows with lintels and triple keystones. The wing is lower with four bays, and contains a porch, sash windows and a stair Venetian window.	II
The Keyhole; 54.43181°N 0.53339°W	—	18th century	The house is in sandstone, and has a pantile roof with stone copings and footstones. There are two storeys and an attic, the gable end facing the road, and there is a single-bay lean-to on the left. Steps lead up to an entrance in the upper floor in the left return. On the front is a large square oriel window, and the attic contains a horizontally-sliding sash window. In the recessed left bay is a modern casement window.	II
The Old Drapery; 54.43184°N 0.53373°W		18th century	A house and shop on a corner site, there is incised rendering on the front, and the right return is in sandstone on the ground floor and in red brick above. The roof is in pantile with a stone ridge and gable copings. There are two storeys, a basement and an attic, and one wide bay. In the ground floor is a doorway with a shop window to the left, both under a cornice, the upper floor contains a canted oriel window, and above is a small light. In the left return is a basement door, a shop windows in the ground floor and a sash window above.	II
Traycliffe; 54.43019°N 0.53271°W	—	18th century	The house is in sandstone with a pantile roof. There are two storeys and a basement, and a rear lean-to. The entrance is at the rear with a modern porch, and the windows are sashes.	II
Waverley Cottage; 54.43041°N 0.53345°W	—	18th century	The house has incised rendered walls, it is on a plinth, and has coved eaves, and a pantile roof with a stone ridge, and copings and a kneeler on the right. There are two storeys and an attic, and two irregular bays. The doorway has a small porch, the windows are sashes, and there is a roof dormer.	II
Willow Cottage (rear); 54.43075°N 0.53363°W	—	Mid 18th century	The house is in sandstone, the west front is rendered, and it has a pantile roof with a stone ridge, copings and block kneelers. There are two storeys, an attic and a basement, and three irregular bays. In the centre is a doorway with a bracketed cornice hood, to the right is a sash window, and the other windows are casements; all the openings have long raised keystones.	II
The Bay Tree; 54.43458°N 0.53477°W		1764	A house, later used for other purposes, in stone, with sill bands, a modillion eaves cornice, a parapet, and a pantile roof with a stone ridge and broad gable copings. There are two storeys and a basement, and five bays, the middle bay wider. Three steps lead up to a central doorway with an architrave, a fanlight, a narrow frieze and a cornice. In the basement are low three-pane windows, and in the floors above are sash windows.	II
Eastwood; 54.43144°N 0.53317°W	—	Mid to late 18th century (probable)	The house is in sandstone, with coved eaves, and a pantile roof with coping and a kneeler on the right. There are two storeys and an attic, and two bays. The doorway to the right has a small gabled hood, the windows are sashes, and there is a dormer.	II
Ledson House; 54.43159°N 0.53291°W	—	Mid to late 18th century	The house is in sandstone, with a pantile roof, stone coping and a small kneeler. There are two storeys and two irregular bays. The doorway has a gabled wood hood on shaped brackets, there is one fixed light, the other windows are sashes, and there are two skylights.	II
Mariners' Cottage and Olsen Cottage; 54.43038°N 0.53324°W	—	Mid to late 18th century	A pair of houses in sandstone with pantile roofs. Each house has two storeys and an attic, and one wide bay. The doorways are paired in the centre, and each has a keystone and a bracketed flat hood. Most of the windows are sashes in architraves, there is one fixed-light window, the ground floor windows have extended lintels and keystones, and there are two dormers.	II
Millbrook; 54.43091°N 0.53262°W	—	Mid to late 18th century	The house, which may have an earlier core, is in sandstone, with two storeys, a basement, and two irregular bays. The doorway is on the left, to its right is a small sash window with a basement opening below. The upper floor contains two sash windows, one horizontally-sliding.	II
Plane Tree Cottage; 54.43043°N 0.53353°W	—	Mid to late 18th century	The cottage is in sandstone, the gable end with incised render, and it has a pantile roof with a stone ridge and copings. There are two storeys and one bay. In the gable end is a doorway and a tripartite sash window with an extended lintel. Above is a 24-pane window, and a raking roof dormer.	II
Stoupe Bank Farmhouse and outbuildings 54.41677°N 0.52547°W		Mid to late 18th century	The buildings are in sandstone, with pantile roofs, stone ridges, copings and curved kneelers. The main house has two storeys and an attic, and two wide bays. The downhouse to the left has one storey and one bay, the outhouse further to the left has one storey and a loft and one bay, to the right is an outbuilding with one storey and a loft and three bays, and at the rear of the house is a dairy extension. In the centre of the main house is a doorway with an alternate block surround and a heavy downcurved lintel. The windows are sashes and there is a raking dormer. The openings elsewhere include stable doors and casement windows.	II
2 The Bolts; 54.43173°N 0.53382°W	—	Late 18th century	A house in sandstone, with a pantile roof, stone copings and curved kneelers. There are two storeys and an attic, and two bays. The doorway has a blocked radial fanlight, a cornice head, and a wooden open pediment on brackets. The windows are sashes and there is a square dormer.	II
Outhouse opposite 2 The Bolts and wall 54.43164°N 0.53387°W	—	Late 18th century (probable)	A wash kitchen in sandstone, with a pantile roof, a stone ridge, copings and block kneelers. There is one storey and one bay. There is a doorway on the street front, on the river front is a doorway with bracketed gabled hood, and the windows are sashes. The forecourt wall is in sandstone with chamfered coping, it is ramped in places, and it contains a small gateway.	II
8 Sunnyside; 54.43028°N 0.53345°W	—	Late 18th century (probable)	The house is rendered, and has a pantile roof with stone gable coping and a kneeler on the right. There are two storeys, two bays, a single-storey entrance bay on the right, and a lean-to on the left. There are two doorways, each with a decorative hood, a casement window in the ground floor, and the upper floor contains a sash window and a later pivoted window.	II
Arndale Cottage; 54.43070°N 0.53297°W	—	Late 18th century (probable)	The cottage is in sandstone, and has a pantile roof with a large stone kneeler. There are two low storeys and two narrow bays. It contains a stable-like door, with a casement window to the left, and in the upper floor are sash windows.	II
Beadle Cottage and Downhill Cottage; 54.43058°N 0.53283°W	—	Late 18th century	A pair of houses in sandstone on a stepped plinth with a pantile roof. There are two storeys and three bays. The left house has a stable-type door, and the right house has a recessed doorway. The windows are a mix, and include fixed windows, a casement window, and sashes, some horizontally-sliding.	II
Former Bligh's Restaurant; 54.43041°N 0.53274°W		Late 18th century	The building, which has been used for various purposes, is pebbledashed on the front facing the road, and rendered elsewhere, and has a tile roof. There are three storeys and a recessed attic, and one bay. In the centre is a doorway, above which is a fascia board, and the windows are sashes.	II
Bramblewick; 54.43174°N 0.53390°W	—	Late 18th century (probable)	The house is in sandstone with a pantile roof. There are two storeys and an attic, and three bays. The doorway is in a round-headed porch with a shallow bracketed hood, the windows are sashes, and there are two raking dormers with a deep bracketed soffit.	II
Bransby Cottage; 54.43164°N 0.53400°W	—	Late 18th century	A house in sandstone with some render and brick in the basement, and a pantile roof with a stone ridge, copings and kneelers. The river front has two storeys and a basement, and two bays, and on the left is an outhouse. The basement windows are tripartite, and above are sash windows. Steps alongside the right return lead to a doorway.	II
Cartwhinzean; 54.43070°N 0.53339°W	—	Late 18th century (probable)	The house is rendered, and has a pantile roof with a stone ridge, copings and kneelers. There are two storeys and three narrow bays. The doorway has a bracketed hood, the windows are sashes, and there is a large dormer.	II
Clarkia; 54.43144°N 0.53304°W	—	Late 18th century (possible)	A cottage with incised render, and a pantile roof with stone coping and a block kneeler. There is one storey and two bays. It contains two doorways, a fixed light and a casement window.	II
Glenhowen; 54.43091°N 0.53256°W	—	Late 18th century (or earlier)	The house has incised rendered walls, a pantile roof, two storeys and one bay. To the right is a passage entry, and to the left is a sash window in the ground floor, and a horizontally-sliding sash in the upper floor.	II
Hawsker Cottage; 54.43151°N 0.53301°W	—	Late 18th century (probable)	A house in sandstone, with a pantile roof, stone gable copings and block kneelers. There are two storeys and an attic, and two bays. The doorway has a shallow flat bracketed hood, most of the windows are sashes, there is a 24-light fixed-light window, and a dormer with a horizontally-sliding sash.	II
Hilda Cottage; 54.43069°N 0.53299°W	—	Late 18th century	The house is in sandstone with an incised rendered front, sill bands, and a pantile roof with a stone ridge, copings and kneelers. There are two storeys, two irregular bays, and a single-storey single-bay extension on the left. The doorway has a fanlight, and the windows are sashes. In the extension is a door with a sidelight, and a parapet.	II
Hillside; 54.43092°N 0.53385°W		Late 18th century	The house is in sandstone, with a Welsh slate roof and broad stone gable copings on block kneelers. There are two storeys and attics, and two bays. The doorway has a lintel with a keystone, the windows are sashes with lintels and keystones, and there are two flat-headed dormers.	II
Homestead; 54.43083°N 0.53365°W	—	Late 18th century	The house is in sandstone, and has a pantile roof with stone gable coping, and a prominent curved kneeler on the left. There are two storeys and an attic, and two bays. The doorway has a blocked segmental radial fanlight, and a gabled wooden hood on shaped brackets, the windows are sashes, and here is a central roof dormer.	II
Hooks House; 54.43898°N 0.54259°W	—	Late 18th century	The house, which was extended in the 19th century, is in sandstone, with a pantile roof and stone gable copings on curved kneelers. There are two storeys and four bays. On the front are doorways and sash windows, some with extended lintels and keystones, and at the rear are varied windows.	II
Lantern Cottage; 54.43101°N 0.53318°W		Late 18th century (probable)	The cottage is in sandstone, with a stepped eaves course, and a pantile roof with stone copings. There are two storeys and two bays. Steps lead up to a doorway on the left, and the windows are casements.	II
Laurel Cottage; 54.43195°N 0.53371°W		Late 18th century	The house is in sandstone, with a floor band, a coved eaves course, and a pantile roof with broad stone coping on a shaped kneeler. There are two storeys and an attic, and one wide bay. The doorway on the right has a cornice hood on brackets, the windows are sashes, and in the roof is a square-headed dormer with a horizontally-sliding sash.	II
Rose Cottage; 54.43052°N 0.54750°W		Late 18th century (probable)	The house is in sandstone, with coved eaves, and a pantile roof with a stone ridge, gable coping and curved kneelers. There are two storeys and three bays. In the centre is a doorway with a four-light fanlight in a trellis porch with a segmental head. Above the doorway is a copper sundial, and the outer bays contain sash windows.	II
Sea View Cottage; 54.43000°N 0.54734°W		Late 18th century	The house is in sandstone on a plinth, with a pantile roof, and a stone ridge, gable coping and a prominent kneeler on the right. There are two storeys and an attic, and three bays, and a small extension to the right. Steps lead up to a central doorway, above which is a fixed light. The other windows are sashes, and there are two flat-headed dormers.	II
Selborne House; 54.43051°N 0.53298°W	—	Late 18th century	The house is in sandstone, and has a pantile roof with stone copings and prominent curved kneelers. There are two storeys and three bays. In the centre is a doorway with a small fixed light to the left and a sash window to the right. In the middle floor are modern windows, and the top floor contains sash windows.	II
Sunnyside; 54.43047°N 0.53306°W	—	Late 18th century (probable)	The house is in sandstone, and has a pantile roof with stone copings and block kneelers. There are two storeys and two irregular bays. The doorway on the left has a gabled hood on full-length brackets. The windows are fixed lights with transom openings.	II
The Bolts House and walls 54.43167°N 0.53375°W	—	Late 18th century	The house is in sandstone and has a pantile roof with stone copings and prominent moulded kneelers. There are two storeys and a basement, and two bays. In the right bay is the passage to The Bolts. In the basement is a doorway and a fixed light, and the floors above contain sash windows. Under the passage arch is a doorway and a fixed light. The forecourt is enclosed by low walls with chamfered coping.	II
The Haven and The Hoe; 54.43067°N 0.53237°W	—	Late 18th century (probable)	A pair of sandstone houses with a pantile roof, stone copings and block kneelers. There are three storeys, and each house has one bay. In the centre are paired doorways in plain surrounds, and the windows are sashes.	II
The Nook; 54.43068°N 0.53250°W	—	Late 18th century (probable)	The house has incised rendered walls and a pantile roof. There are two storeys and an attic, and one bay. On the right is a through passage containing a doorway. The windows are sashes, and there is a wide dormer.	II
Viewley Cottage and Willow Cottage; 54.43080°N 0.53357°W	—	Late 18th century	A house later divided into two houses, in sandstone, the left house with incised rendering, and a pantile roof with stone coping and a prominent kneeler on the left. There are two storeys and attics, and each house has one wide bay. The doorways are in the centre, the left with a small porch, and the right with a bracketed hood. There is one casement window, the other windows are sashes, and there are two roof dormers.	II
Outbuilding opposite Windy Ridge; 54.43209°N 0.53287°W	—	Late 18th century	The wash kitchen and outhouse are in sandstone with a concrete tile roof. There is one storey and two bays. The building contains paired central doors flanked by small sash windows.	II
Former Methodist Chapel; 54.43111°N 0.53263°W	—	1779	The chapel, which has been converted for other uses, is in sandstone on a plinth, with quoins, a stepped eaves band, and a hipped pantile roof with stone ridges and coping. The street front has one tall storey and two wide bays, and contains a doorway and fixed lights with wedge lintels and keystones. Along the left return are steps, there are two storeys and five bays, and it contains sash windows and a small flat-roofed porch.	II
Bridge over Ramsdale Beck; 54.42079°N 0.54907°W	—	c. 1800	The bridge, which carries a road over the stream, is in sandstone, and consists of a single round arch. It has raised voussoirs and a band, and it is framed by stepped abutments. The parapets recede at the ends to form pedestrian refuges.	II
Demesne Farmhouse, farmbuildings and walls 54.41604°N 0.55222°W		c. 1800	All the buildings are in sandstone, and most roofs are in Welsh slate with coped gables and kneelers. The farmhouse has two storeys and an attic, and three bays, and flanking recessed single-storey wings linking with the farm buildings. It contains a central doorway with a porch and a fanlight and sash windows. The farm buildings are in one and two storeys, and are arranged around a rectangular courtyard. The garden to the south of the farmhouse is enclosed by a sandstone wall with stone coping, and it contains a gateway with an iron gate.	II
Glencoe; 54.43171°N 0.53295°W	—	Late 18th or early 19th century	A house in sandstone, with a pantile roof, a stone ridge, roll-moulded gable copings, and kneelers. There are two storeys and an attic, and a three-bay width The doorway has an open pediment, to its left is a bootscraper hole, and above it is a sash window. In the left return are two sash windows, and the right return is blank.	II
Outbuilding range east of Hooks House; 54.43907°N 0.54216°W	—	18th or early 19th century	The range consists of barns and byres in sandstone with pantile roofs. Nearer the house there is one storey, and further away there is one storey and lofts. The building contains doorways, one with a heavy chamfered lintel, loading doors, slit vents, and a raking dormer in red brick.	II
Peters House and Summerest; 54.43074°N 0.53348°W		Late 18th or early 19th century	A pair of houses with incised rendering, and a pantile roof with a tile ridge, and stone coping and a kneeler on the left. There are two storeys and each house has two bays. Both houses have a gabled porch, Summerest, to the right of the door has a 15-pane fixed light, Peters House has a tripartite window to the left of the door, in the upper floors are sash windows, and each house has a dormer.	II
The Dolphin Hotel; 54.43074°N 0.53250°W		Late 18th or early 19th century	The public house is in painted brick, and has a Welsh slate roof. There are two storeys and three irregular bays. The doorway on the left has a fanlight, and the windows are sashes, most under flat brick arches.	II
Windy Ridge; 54.43208°N 0.53296°W	—	Late 18th or early 19th century	The house is in sandstone, partly rendered, with a moulded eaves course, and a pantile roof with stone coping and a kneeler on the left. There are two storeys and a basement, one wide bay, and a canted bay on the right with an attic. Steps lead up to the doorway in the left bay that has a small bracketed hood, and the windows are sashes.	II
Fyling Hall; 54.42549°N 0.55763°W		1819	A large house, later a school, in sandstone with a purple slate roof. It consists of a main block with three storeys and four bays, and flanking wings. In the centre is a three-bay porch with four pilasters, containing a door with sidelights, all with fanlights, and a pediment-shaped top with corner urns. Most of the windows on the front are sashes, there is a central round-headed stair window with impost blocks and a keystone, and at the top is a cornice and a parapet. At the rear are three storeys and a basement, and three bays. Steps lead to a central porch with a door, flanked by two-storey canted bay windows. There is a two-bay billiard-room extension, and a terrace with a balustrade.	II
Old St Stephen's Church; 54.44017°N 0.54965°W		1821	The church, now redundant, is in sandstone with a purple slate roof. It consists of a nave, a south porch, a north vestry and a small sanctuary. On the west gable is a bell-cupola. The porch has a pediment, a segmental-arched entrance with rusticated voussoirs. Above it is a sundial, and inside are wooden benches.	I
3 Sunny Place; 54.43166°N 0.53336°W	—	Early 19th century	A sandstone house in a terrace that has a pantile roof with a stone ridge, coping and curved kneelers. There are two storeys, a basement and an attic. A flight of seven steps with a wrought iron handrail leads to a doorway with a radial fanlight and a segmental-headed porch. The windows are sashes, and in the attic are dormers with segmental pediments.	II
Wall south of 3 Sunny Place; 54.43162°N 0.53342°W	—	Early 19th century	The wall on the right side of the garden to the front of the house is in sandstone. It is high on the right, and slopes down to a pair of square gate piers with stepped cornices and ball finials.	II
8 and 9 Sunny Place; 54.43172°N 0.53329°W	—	Early 19th century (probable)	A pair of houses in incised render with a pantile roof. There are two storeys and attics, and each house has one wide bay. On the front are two doorways and sash windows, and each house has a dormer.	II
1 Albion Street; 54.43025°N 0.53284°W		Early 19th century (probable)	The house is in sandstone, and has a pantile roof with a stone ridge, copings and kneelers. There are two storeys and an attic, and one bay. Steps lead up to a doorway with a casement window to the right and a garage door below. In the attic is a three-light dormer, and in the right return is a sash window.	II
Auburn Cottage and Beeston Cottage; 54.43150°N 0.53277°W	—	Early 19th century (probable)	A pair of houses in sandstone with a pantile roof. Each house has two storeys and an attic, and one wide bay. The doorways are paired in the centre, the windows are sashes, and each house has a later large dormer.	II
Bay Bank House and The Cellar; 54.43220°N 0.53420°W		Early 19th century	A house and a shop in sandstone with a hipped Welsh slate roof. The front facing the road has three storeys and one wide bay. In the ground floor is a stable door and two shop windows, and the upper floors contain sash windows. The left return is the main front, it is approached by steps, and has two storeys and a basement, three bays, and a single-bay extension on the left. The central doorway has a gabled hood on brackets, and the windows are sashes.	II
Beach House; 54.43046°N 0.53239°W		Early 19th century (probable)	A house in sandstone with a hipped pantile roof. There are two storeys and an attic, and three bays. The central doorway has a fanlight and a plain surround, the windows are sashes, and there is a raking dormer. The left return has a basement, a raking dormer, coping on the left and a kneeler.	II
Beck Cottage and garage 54.43125°N 0.53320°W		Early 19th century	The house and garage to the left are in sandstone, and have a pantile roof with a stone ridge, copings and kneelers. There are two storeys and each part has two bays. In the house is a doorway, the garage contains garage doors under a lintel with a carved mask, and the windows are a mix of casements and sashes. At the rear are three storeys and a basement, and there is a small lean-to on the south.	II
Bedlington; 54.43163°N 0.53330°W		Early 19th century	A pair of houses in sandstone, with a pantile roof, stone copings and prominent curved kneelers. There are two storeys and attics, and each house has one bay. Three steps lead up to the central paired doorways, the windows are sashes, and in the attic are flat-headed dormers with horizontally-sliding sashes.	II
Blacksmiths Cottage; 54.42994°N 0.54729°W		Early 19th century	The house and forge are in sandstone, and have pantile roofs with a stone ridge, copings and kneelers. The house has three storeys and two bays, and the forge to the left has one storey and two bays. The house has a doorway with a bracketed hood, and sash windows. In the forge is a door, a small horizontally-sliding sash window, and two loft openings.	II
Brereton; 54.43212°N 0.53326°W	—	Early 19th century	The house is in sandstone with a Welsh slate roof. On the front are two storeys, an attic and a basement, one bay and a narrow staircase bay. On the front is a doorway, above which is a sash window, a fixed attic window, and two fixed staircase windows.	II
Brock Hall and outbuilding 54.40915°N 0.56868°W		Early 19th century	The farmhouse and outbuilding are in sandstone, and have a Welsh slate roof with a stone ridge, coping and curved kneelers. There are two storeys and three bays, a single-storey extension to the right, and a two-bay outbuilding on the left. The house has a central doorway and sash windows, and in the outbuilding are doorways, and at the rear is a segmental-arched cart entrance.	II
Daisy Cottage; 54.43176°N 0.53282°W	—	Early 19th century	Two houses combined into one, with incised rendered walls, and a pantile roof with stone copings and small curved kneelers. There are two storeys and two bays, the left bay slightly canted back. In the centre are paired doorways under a bracketed gabled hood, and the windows are sashes.	II
Cliff House; 54.43169°N 0.53272°W	—	Early 19th century (probable)	The house, which may have an earlier core, has incised rendering, it is on a plinth, and has a pantile roof with stone coping. There are three storeys and an attic, and two bays. The doorway is in the centre, in the lower two floors are sash windows, the top floor contains a casement window, and in the attic is a blank window.	II
Ewden; 54.43102°N 0.53319°W	—	Early 19th century (possible)	The house is in re-used stone, partly rendered, and has a pantile roof with some Welsh slate, a stone ridge, copings and kneelers. There are two storeys and an attic, two bays, and a single-bay extension to the right. The doorway has a bracketed cornice hood, to its right is a former shop window with fluted pilasters and a bracketed cornice hood. In the upper floor are 20th-century windows, and the attic contains a casement window.	II
Fieldside; 54.43037°N 0.53343°W	—	Early 19th century	The cottage has a sandstone ground floor, the upper part is in brick, the gable end facing the road is rendered, and it has a pantile roof with wide stone copings and block kneelers. There is one storey and an attic, and two bays. To the left of the doorway is a small sash window, to the right is a two-light casement, and above is a half-dormer with a sash.	II
Friends House and September Cottage; 54.43170°N 0.53347°W		Early 19th century	A pair of houses with basement flats, in sandstone with a pantile roof, curved kneelers, and stone gable copings. There are three storeys and basements, each house has one bay, and to the left is an extension with one storey and a basement. Steps lead up to a terrace in front of the doorways, which are paired in the centre of the houses, and have bracketed flat hoods, The windows are sashes, and there are small basement windows.	II
Wall and gate piers, Fyling Hall; 54.42406°N 0.55733°W	—	Early 19th century	The wall and gate piers to the south of the house are in sandstone. The walls are about 7 feet (2.1 m) high with flat coping. The gate piers are square and taller, and each has a cornice, and a ball finial on a pedestal.	II
Low Hall Farmhouse and wall 54.42296°N 0.55024°W		Early 19th century	The farmhouse is in sandstone, with a sill band, an eaves cornice, and a hipped purple slate roof with stone ridges. The main block has two storeys and an attic, and three bays, the middle bay projecting under a pediment containing an oculus with keystones. Steps lead up to a central doorway with pilasters, a patterned fanlight, and a cornice on large console brackets, and the windows are sashes. The main block is flanked by single-storey wings, and at the rear is a doorway with a fanlight and casement windows. The wall enclosing the area at the rear has four courses and rounded coping.	II
Farmbuildings northeast of Low Hall Farmhouse; 54.42306°N 0.54989°W	—	Early 19th century	The farm buildings are in sandstone with purple slate roofs. They have one storey and loft, and are ranged around a courtyard. The openings include segmental arches, some with keystones, and stable doors and windows with plain lintels.	II
Garden walls, Low Hall Farmhouse; 54.42284°N 0.55038°W	—	Early 19th century	The walls are in sandstone, and consist of four courses of large stones with semicircular coping. They flank the driveway, and also enclose a quadrant-shaped space.	II
Hollington; 54.43197°N 0.53320°W	—	Early 19th century	The house is in sandstone, and has a pantile roof with a stone ridge, copings and kneelers. There are two storeys and an attic, and one wide bay. On the front is a modern doorway, sash windows and a small square-headed dormer.	II
Inthorpe and wall 54.43184°N 0.54698°W	—	Early 19th century	The house is in sandstone, with rusticated quoins, and a purple slate roof with a stone ridge, copings and prominent shaped kneelers. There are two storeys and three bays. The central doorway has a three-pane fanlight, and the windows are sashes. Short side walls run forward from the house, the front wall is ramped down near the outer ends, and they have chamfered copings. In the centre is a pair of monolith piers with cornices and a gate in wood and iron.	II
Joyce Cottage; 54.43036°N 0.53327°W	—	Early 19th century (probable)	The house is in sandstone, the ground floor partly rendered, with a pantile roof, and stone gable copings on curved kneelers. There are two storeys and two irregular bays. The doorway on the right has a gabled hood on decorative brackets, there is one casement window, and the other windows are sashes in architraves.	II
Langwood; 54.43054°N 0.53332°W	—	Early 19th century	The house is in sandstone, and has a pantile roof with a stone ridge, copings and kneelers. There are two storeys and an attic, and one wide bay. The doorway on the right has a bracketed quasi-cornice, the windows are sashes, and there is a roof dormer. On the left is a small single-storey extension with a doorway and a fixed window.	II
Leafs Shop Muir Lea; 54.43172°N 0.53372°W		Early 19th century	A house and a shop in sandstone, with a pantile roof, stone copings and kneelers. There are four storeys and two bays. In the ground floor is a shop front with flanking windows, and the upper floors contain sash windows. To the left is an archway leading to The Bolts, containing a house doorway in a small porch.	II
Roseworth; 54.43189°N 0.53320°W	—	Early 19th century	The house is in sandstone, with chamfered quoins on the right, and a pantile roof with moulded stone gabled copings. There are three storeys on the front, and one wide bay. In the ground floor is a doorway with pilasters and a cornice on tall brackets, above which are sash windows. On the right return are steps, and at the rear are four storeys.	II
Rothwell Cottage; 54.43059°N 0.53320°W	—	Early 19th century	The house, which possibly contains earlier material, is in sandstone with a pantile roof. There are two storeys, the gable end faces the street, and there is one wide bay. The house has one inserted casement window, and the other windows are sashes.	II
Sea View and High Sea View; 54.43217°N 0.53325°W		Early 19th century	A house divided into two, it has incised rendered walls and a Welsh slate roof. There are two storeys, a basement and attics, and two wide bays. Steps with a handrail and railings lead up to a doorway, and there is a separate basement entrance. There is one pivoted casement window, the other windows are sashes, and there are two dormers.	II
Seacroft; 54.43188°N 0.53292°W	—	Early 19th century	The house is in sandstone with a pantile roof, two storeys and two bays. The central doorway has reeded pilasters, a frieze, and a bracketed open pediment containing a beaded panel. The windows are sashes.	II
Storm Cottage; 54.43144°N 0.53268°W	—	Early 19th century	The house has incised rendered walls and a pantile roof. There are two storeys and two bays. On the right is a door with a fanlight, and to its left are two sash windows. The upper roof contains two square oriel windows.	II
The Bay Hotel; 54.43039°N 0.53205°W		Early 19th century	The hotel, which was extended later in the 19th century, is in sandstone, and has a pantile roof with a stone ridge, copings and kneelers. The original part has two storeys and a tall basement, and a T-shaped plan with a projecting central bay. A wide flight of steps leads to the entrance, with a shop in the angle and a store under the steps, and the windows are sashes. The extension to the right is rendered, with floor bands, and the roof is hipped on the right. There are three storeys and two bays. On the left is a doorway and to the right a public house window. The middle floor contains two canted oriel windows, and in the top floor are sashes.	II
The Cottage and outbuildings 54.42383°N 0.55756°W	—	Early 19th century	Two houses, later combined, in sandstone. The house has a deep eaves soffit, and a purple slate roof with a stone ridge, ridged gable copings and square kneelers on big brackets. There are two storeys and five bays. On the front are two doorways in architraves with flattened ogee heads. Above the doorway are single-light windows, the other windows are chamfered and mullioned, and all have architraves. To the right is a single-storey outbuilding with a pantile roof, a doorway and a mullioned window.	II
The Little House; 54.43098°N 0.53290°W		Early 19th century	The house is in sandstone with a pantile roof, and has two low storeys and one narrow bay. The doorway has a bracketed gabled hood, to its left is a sash window, and the upper floor contains a 24-pane fixed light with a sliding bottom centre section.	II
The Sweet Shop; 54.43036°N 0.53266°W	—	Early 19th century (probable)	A house and a shop with incised rendered walls and a pantile roof. There are two storeys and an attic, and one bay, with the gable end facing the street. In the ground floor is a shopfront, with a central door and flanking windows under a cornice on shaped brackets. The upper floor contains a four-light 20th-century window, and in the attic is a horizontally-sliding sash window. In the left return are scattered windows.	II
Wavecrest; 54.43013°N 0.53268°W	—	Early 19th century (probable)	The house is in sandstone, and has stepped eaves and a parapet. There are two storeys and an attic, and three bays. The doorway has a cornice, and the windows are sashes in architraves, other than one that has been converted into a casement.	II
1–9 Bloomswell; 54.43211°N 0.53358°W		Early to mid 19th century	A terrace of nine rendered houses with pantile roofs. Each house has three storeys and one bay. Some doorways have reeded pilasters, a radial fanlight, and a bracketed open pediment, and some have been altered. Most windows are sashes, those in the top floor horizontally-sliding, some have been altered, and there is one modern dormer.	II
2–11 Esplanade; 54.43223°N 0.53360°W		Early to mid 19th century	A terrace of ten houses in pinkish brick, some rendered, with roofs of blue and purple Welsh slate. Each house has three storeys, one wide bay, and a doorway. Most of the windows are sashes, some have been altered, and all the openings have wedge lintels. There is an added bay window, a porch and various rear extensions.	II
Ballina and Greystones; 54.43182°N 0.53325°W	—	Early to mid 19th century	A pair of houses in sandstone on a plinth with a pantile roof. There are two storeys, attics and basements, and two wide bays. Five steps lead up to paired doorways with a bracketed double hood. In the basement are small windows, elsewhere there are sashes and a paired dormer.	II
Brigholme; 54.43117°N 0.53326°W	—	Early to mid 19th century	A house and shop in sandstone, with a pantile roof, a stone ridge, coping on the right, and a curved kneeler. In the ground floor is a garage door and a shop window to the right, and the upper floors contain sash windows. The doorway at the rear has pilasters and a bracketed hood, and on the right return is a flight of stone steps.	II
Burley Cottage; 54.43121°N 0.53332°W		Early to mid 19th century	The house is in sandstone, with a pantile roof, a stone ridge, coping on the right, and a curved kneeler. There are three storeys and one wide bay. In the ground floor is a doorway and a small sash window to the right. The middle floor contains a canted oriel window, and there is a sash window in the top floor. At the rear is a doorway with pilasters and a bracketed hood.	II
Burn Close; 54.43111°N 0.53318°W		Early to mid 19th century	A sandstone house, the attic rendered, with a pantile roof, and a stone ridge, coping and a kneeler on the left. There are three storeys and an attic, and one bay. In the ground floor is a garage door, above are sash windows, and in the attic is a casement window and a skylight. The doorway at the rear has pilasters and a bracketed hood.	II
Darnholm and Oakfield; 54.43186°N 0.53312°W	—	Early to mid 19th century	Two houses in sandstone, with a Welsh slate roof, stone copings and kneelers. There are two storeys, and each house has one wide bay. The doorways are paired in the centre, and each has a gabled hood. The windows are sashes, and there is a flat-headed dormer.	II
Eden House; 54.43087°N 0.53375°W		Early to mid 19th century	The house, which may have an earlier origin, is in sandstone, with a pantile roof, a tile ridge, and stone gable coping and a curved kneeler on the left. There are two storeys and an attic, and three bays. The doorway has raised jambs, a fanlight, and a bracketed hood. The windows are sashes with moulded sills, and there are two raking dormers.	II
Elm House; 54.43151°N 0.53314°W	—	Early to mid 19th century	The house has incised rendered walls, and a pantile roof with stone coping and kneelers. There are two storeys and two bays, and a small extension on the left. On the front is a doorway, most of the windows are sashes, there is a fixed light in the extension, and a skylight.	II
Heath Cottage and the Good Earth Cafe; 54.43077°N 0.53298°W		Early to mid 19th century	A house and a shop in sandstone, with a pantile roof and a stone curved kneeler on the right. There are three storeys and two bays. In the ground floor is a shop front with a bracketed cornice, flanked by small windows, and to the left is a doorway. The middle floor contains sash windows, and in the top floor are horizontally-sliding sashes.	II
Oakridge Cottage; 54.43152°N 0.53317°W	—	Early to mid 19th century	The cottage is in sandstone, and has a pantile roof with stone coping and a kneeler. There are two storeys and two bays, the right bay is canted at the left and the left bay projects and is square. The doorway has a bracketed hood and is in a larger stone-filled opening. In the right bay are sash windows in architraves, and the left bay has inserted vents.	II
Former Post Office; 54.43047°N 0.53226°W		Early to mid 19th century	A house and a shop in sandstone with sill bands, and a Welsh slate roof with stone copings and kneelers. There are three storeys and a cellar on the right, and two bays. Steps lead to a central doorway flanked by shop windows with pilasters, and over all is a bracketed cornice. The upper floors contain sash windows. At the rear are two earlier rendered wings with pantile roofs, each with two storeys and three bays.	II
Seascape; 54.43084°N 0.53230°W		Early to mid 19th century	The house is in sandstone, with a slate roof, stone copings and kneelers. There are two storeys and an attic, and two wide bays. The central doorway has panelled pilasters, and a low gabled hood. The windows are sashes, and there is a large dormer.	II
St Robert's Chantry; 54.43070°N 0.53250°W	—	Early to mid 19th century	The house is in incised render on sandstone, and has a pantile roof with stone coping and a kneeler on the right. There are two storeys and an attic, and one bay. The doorway on the left has a gabled hood on full-length brackets, the windows are sashes in architraves, and there is a raking dormer.	II
Strauton and Roma; 54.43070°N 0.53299°W	—	Early to mid 19th century	A pair of houses with incised rendered walls, and a pantile roof with stone copings and large curved kneelers. At the front are two storeys, and each house has two bays. There are two doorways and a variety of small windows. On the right return, steps lead down to a basement door. At the rear are three storeys and a basement, and three bays. The openings include sashes, a tripartite window, French windows and casements.	II
The Gable; 54.43013°N 0.53225°W	—	Early to mid 19th century	The house is in sandstone, the west end with incised rendering, and it has a pantile roof with stone copings and large curved kneelers. The south front has two storeys and two bays. It contains a doorway with a pedimented hood on console brackets, and the windows are sashes. The left return has three storeys and two bays under a gable, and there is a single-storey projection. At the rear are three storeys and three bays.	II
The Rainbow; 54.43067°N 0.53251°W		Early to mid 19th century	A house and a shop, later a museum, in sandstone, with a pantile roof, stone copings and small curved kneelers. There are two tall storeys and an attic, and two wide bays. In the ground floor is a doorway, to its left is a casement window, and further to the left is a four-light shop window set in a former segmental-arched cart entrance with voussoirs. Above the shop window is a small casement window, the upper floor contains horizontally-sliding sash windows, and there are two flat-headed dormers.	II
4 Martin's Row; 54.43194°N 0.53353°W	—	1836	The house is in sandstone, and has a pantile roof with broad stone coping and a moulded kneeler on the left. There are two storeys and an attic, and two bays, the right bay wider. In the left bay is a doorway with a casement window above, in the right bay are sash windows, and in the attic is a small dormer. One lintel is dated.	II
6 Martin's Row; 54.43192°N 0.53346°W	—	c. 1840	The house is in sandstone, and has a pantile roof with a stone ridge, coping, and moulded kneelers. There are two storeys, an attic and a basement, and three bays. Steps with cast iron handrails lead up to a doorway with pilasters, a fanlight and an open pediment. The windows are sashes, and there is a large modern dormer.	II
United Reformed Church; 54.43082°N 0.53327°W		1840	The chapel is in sandstone, and has a Welsh slate roof with stone copings and block kneelers. The entrance front is gabled, and has two storeys and three wide bays. Steps lead up to a central gabled porch with a trefoil finial containing double doors. The windows have pointed arches and hood moulds, and above the porch is an oval plaque with the date and an inscription.	II
York House; 54.43084°N 0.53230°W	—	c. 1840	The house has incised rendered walls, and a Welsh slate roof with bargeboards and spike finials. There are two storeys, a basement and an attic, and two bays. The doorway on the left has pilasters, an entablature and a modillion cornice. To is right is a square oriel window on brackets, with a cast iron top guard and part of a ship's stem post attached in the centre. In the upper floor and attic are sash windows with chamfered surrounds and keystones. The basement has windows with chamfered surrounds, and the basement area is enclosed by railings.	II
Fyling Hall Lodge; 54.42628°N 0.56528°W	—	1842	An estate lodge, later a private house, in sandstone on a stepped plinth, with carved dressings, and a purple slate roof with a stone ridge, ridged gable copings and ball finials. There is a single storey and an L-shaped plan. On the front is a gabled porch with a stable-type door. The windows are chamfered with mullions, some mullions lost, and hood moulds. Over one window is a coat of arms and an inscription.	II
Avery Cottage; 54.43155°N 0.53328°W	—	Mid 19th century	The cottage is in sandstone with a Welsh slate roof. There are two storeys and one narrow bay. It contains a doorway and a small sash window.	II
Bramley Cottage; 54.43086°N 0.53305°W	—	Mid 19th century	The house is in incised render, and has a pantile roof with rendered copings and curved stone kneelers. There are three storeys and an attic, a gabled front bay, and two bays on the right return. On the front is a doorway with a fanlight under a flat hood, and the windows are sashes.	II
Downholme and the Cranny; 54.43075°N 0.53249°W		Mid 19th century (probable)	A pair of houses in painted brick, with a floor band, a stepped and dentilled eaves cornice, and a roof of pantile and French tile. There are two storeys and attics, and three bays. The doorways share a bracketed hood, the windows are sashes, there are two dormers, and to the left is a small basement window.	II
Former Fisherman's Cottage and Sea View; 54.43090°N 0.53294°W		Mid 19th century	A pair of houses with shops beneath, in sandstone, with raised chamfered quoins and a pantile roof. There are three storeys and a basement, and three bays. In the basement are two shop fronts with pilasters, end brackets and bracketed cornices. Between them are two doorways under a flight of steps leading up to paired doorways with fanlights. Above these are blind windows, and in the outer bays are sash windows.	II
Gilroy House; 54.43097°N 0.53300°W	—	Mid 19th century	A house with a restaurant beneath, in sandstone with a pantile roof, stone copings and kneelers. There are three storeys and a high basement, and three bays. In the basement is a double shop front and an off-centre doorway. To the left, steps with a handrail lead to a balcony in front of the ground floor of the house. This has a central doorway with a fanlight, and to its right is a canted bay window with a moulded cornice. To the left, and in the middle floor, are sash windows, and the top floor contains casement windows.	II
Garden walls in front of The Bay Tree; 54.43454°N 0.53518°W		Mid 19th century (probable)	The walls to the north and west of the garden are in sandstone, with rolled rounded coping. The left wall is tall near the house, but ramped down at the west end to meet the lower front wall, which has a series of ramps down the hillside. It contains a central pair of gate piers, with cornices and pyramidal caps, and a single wrought iron gate.	II
Lancelot Cottage; 54.43053°N 0.53353°W	—	Mid 19th century	The house is in sandstone, and has a pantile roof with stone copings and prominent curved kneelers. There are two storeys and an attic, and two bays. The door has a flat hood on curved brackets, the windows are sshes, and there is a roof dormer with a three-light horizontally-sliding sash.	II
Medora and Holmlea; 54.43205°N 0.53321°W	—	Mid 19th century	A pair of sandstone houses with pantile roofs, a stone ridge, coping and kneelers. Each house has three storeys and one wide bay. The doorways are paired in the centre, and each has alternately-reeded panelled pilasters, a radial fanlight, a reeded frieze and an open pediment. The windows are sashes, some in architraves.	II
Maryondale Cottage and shop 54.43022°N 0.53291°W	—	Mid 19th century	A house with a shop in sandstone, the left return in red brick, with a pantile roof, stone copings and a kneeler on the right. There are three storeys and three wide bays. In the left bay is a segmental-arched carriage entrance converted into a shop. In the centre is a doorway with a fanlight and a bracketed cornice, and to the right is a pivoted window and a passage door with a fanlight. The upper floors contain sash windows, and above them are raking dormers.	II
Premises of Tony Straw; 54.43051°N 0.53246°W		Mid 19th century	A house with business premises below, adjacent to the Men's Institute, it i s in sandstone, and has a pantile roof with a stone ridge, and coping and a kneeler on the left. There are two storeys and three bays. In the centre is a doorway, flanked by windows that are blocked at the bottom and with slats above. Further to the left is another doorway, and the upper floor contains sash windows in architraves. Below the central window is a coat of arms with a motto.	II
Primrose and Primrose Flat; 54.43015°N 0.53297°W	—	Mid 19th century	A house divided into two flats, the ground floor once a store, in sandstone, with a pantile roof, and stone coping and a kneeler on the right. At the front are three storeys and two wide bays. In the centre is a doorway, to its left is a casement window, and the other windows are sashes. To the right are eternal steps to the doorway of Primrose Flat, with a casement window to the right. At the rear there is one storey, two doorways with hoods, and sash windows.	II
Sandal House; 54.43061°N 0.53232°W	—	Mid 19th century	The house is in sandstone, and has a pantile roof with stone coping and a kneeler on the right. There are three storeys and one wide bay. On the right is a doorway with a fanlight and a gabled hood on full-height brackets, and to its right is a 21-pane window with a flat hood. The upper floors contain sash windows, in the top floor is a small casement window, and there is an inscribed plaque.	II
The Pottery; 54.43154°N 0.53334°W		Mid 19th century	A house and shop in sandstone with a Welsh slate roof. There are three storeys and two wide bays. In the ground floor is a doorway with a shop window to the left and a sash window to the right, all under a continuous lintel. The upper floors contain sash windows.	II
Woodside; 54.43012°N 0.53304°W	—	Mid 19th century	The house is in sandstone, and has a pantile roof with stone coping and a kneeler on the right. There are three storeys, and one wide bay, canted back on the right. On the left is a doorway with a small modern window to the right, and the upper floors contain sash windows. In the right return is a door and scattered windows.	II
Fishermans Cottage; 54.43045°N 0.53237°W		1860	A public house, later a private house, with rendered walls, and a pantile roof with a stone ridge and gable coping. There are three storeys and an attic, the gable end faces the road, and there is one wide bay. The doorway is to the right, and the windows are casements. On the left is a projecting chimney stack with a small inserted light to its right.	II
The Launderette; 54.43060°N 0.53232°W	—	Mid to late 19th century	A house and a shop on an older base, in sandstone, with a Welsh slate roof, three storeys and two bays. In the ground floor is a garage door and a shop window to the right, both under a continuous cornice. There are flanking doors with fanlights, and the windows in the upper floors are sashes.	II
St Stephen's Church; 54.43414°N 0.53912°W		1868–70	The church, designed by G. E. Street, is in sandstone with a red tile roof and a decorative ridge. It consists of a nave with a clerestory, a south aisle, a south porch, a chancel with a north organ chamber, a south chapel and vestry, and an apse at the east end, and a southeast tower. The tower has four stages, angle buttresses, string courses, lancet windows and a roundel in the second stage, the bell openings have moulded surrounds and hood moulds, and at the top is a saddleback roof.	II*
Gateway south of St Stephen's Church; 54.43396°N 0.53924°W		Late 19th century	The gateway has square sandstone gate piers with stepped curved caps, and oak gates with panelled lower parts. Flanking these are quadrant walls with stepped moulded copings. Attached to the west wall is a lamp holder on a two-stage octagonal post, with a cast iron gooseneck and ornamental rings.	II
Conservatory southwest of Jays House; 54.43484°N 0.53623°W	—	Late 19th century	The conservatory is about 5 metres (16 ft) long, with half-octagonal ends. It has a plinth in red brick with a chamfered top, and a glazed wooden superstructure. At the top is a stained glass frieze and a hip-ended roof with ball finials.	II
Mile post south of junction of High Normanby Road; 54.44776°N 0.56616°W	—	Late 19th century	The mile post on the east side of the A171 road is in cast iron. It has a triangular plan with a forward-sloping triangular top. On the top is inscribed "WHITBY STRAND HD", and on the lower faces are trees in relief. On the left face is the distance to Scarborough, and on the right face to Whitby.	II
Mile post south of entrance to St Ives Farm; 54.40953°N 0.58413°W	—	Late 19th century	The mile post on the east side of the A171 road is in cast iron. It has a triangular plan with a forward-sloping triangular top. On the top is inscribed "WHITBY STRAND HD", and on the lower faces are trees in relief. On the left face is the distance to Scarborough, and on the right face to Whitby.	II
Mile post west of Low Flask Farm; 54.39687°N 0.57719°W	—	Late 19th century	The mile post on the east side of the A171 road is in cast iron. It has a triangular plan with a forward-sloping triangular top. On the top is inscribed "WHITBY STRAND HD", and on the lower faces are trees in relief. On the left face is the distance to Scarborough, and on the right face to Whitby.	II
Mile post northeast of Wragby; 54.39237°N 0.55622°W	—	Late 19th century	The mile post on the northeast side of the A171 road is in cast iron. It has a triangular plan with a forward-sloping triangular top. On the top is inscribed "WHITBY STRAND HD", and on the lower faces are pointing hands, the left face indicating the distance to Scarborough, and the right face to Whitby.	II
The Old School House^{A} 54.43078°N 0.54949°W		Late 19th century	The school, later a private house, is in sandstone, and has a Welsh slate roof with stone coping. There are two storeys and three bays, the right bay projecting and gabled. The middle bay is narrow and contains a porch in a concave-shouldered arch, the upper storey of which is broached and canted, containing a small oculus, and surmounted by a hexagonal spirelet. In the ground floor are three-light mullioned windows with long-shouldered heads and hood moulds, and the upper floor contains two-light windows with trefoil heads, the left in a gabled half-dormer.	II
The Fish; 54.43031°N 0.53233°W		1887	A collecting box for donations to the Royal National Lifeboat Institution. It is a painted sculpture in cast iron depicting a cod standing on its tail, with its mouth open forming a slot. The sculpture is about 1.2 metres (3 ft 11 in) high, and it weighs just over 110 kilograms (240 lb).	II
The Pigsty; 54.42369°N 0.55790°W		1891	The Pigsty is in the form of a Classical or Egyptian temple, and is in stone on a basement with buttress-plinths. At the front is a hexastyle portico, with timber quasi-Ionic columns on stone bases, supporting an entablature with a reeded frieze, a mutuled cornice, and a pediment with acroterion, all in wood. In the tympanum are the remains of a trophy of arms. The frieze and cornice continue round the building, which also has a pediment at the rear, and along the sides are five bays.	II*
Boggle House; 54.41543°N 0.53948°W		1898–99	The house is in red engineering brick with terracotta dressings, and a tile roof with terracotta copings, and is in Arts and Crafts style. There are two storeys and attics, and an L-shaped plan with a front of two bays. The doorway has a chamfered surround, and a lobed lintel containing a panel with decoration and the date. The windows have chamfered and moulded surrounds and mullions.	II
Robin Hood's Bay Museum and Reading Room; 54.43065°N 0.53332°W		c. 1900	The museum and reading room were remodelled from an earlier building. It is in stone with a string course, and a swept pantile roof with a stone ridge, and coping and a kneeler on the left. There are two storeys and two bays, and a single-storey entrance bay on the left. To the left of the main block is a doorway with a hollow-chamfered surround and a flattened ogee lintel. Above is a single-light window, and in the right bay are mullioned windows. The entrance bay is gabled and contains a similar doorway, above which is a round-headed window and a cross finial.	II
War memorial 54.43404°N 0.53922°W		c. 1919	The war memorial is in the churchyard of St Stephen's Church, and is in sandstone. It is in the form of a Saxon cross on a tall sloping base. The memorial has cable-moulded borders, and panels with interlace, and two with figures in relief. On the lower part of the cross is an inscription, under which is a copper plate with the names of those lost in the Second World War. The names of those lost in the First World War are inscribed on the base.	II
Cottage opposite Sunny Vale; 54.43174°N 0.53435°W	—	Undated	A wash house converted into a cottage, in sandstone with a pantile roof, hipped to the north. On the left return is a doorway, a sash window and a fixed light, and on the river front is a casement window.	II

== Notes ==
A. These structures are in the Lands common to Fylingdales and Hawsker-cum-Stainsacre.
