= Raw, North Yorkshire =

Hamlet in North Yorkshire, England

Coordinates: 54.437°N 0.560°W

Raw: Fyling Raw
- Hamlet
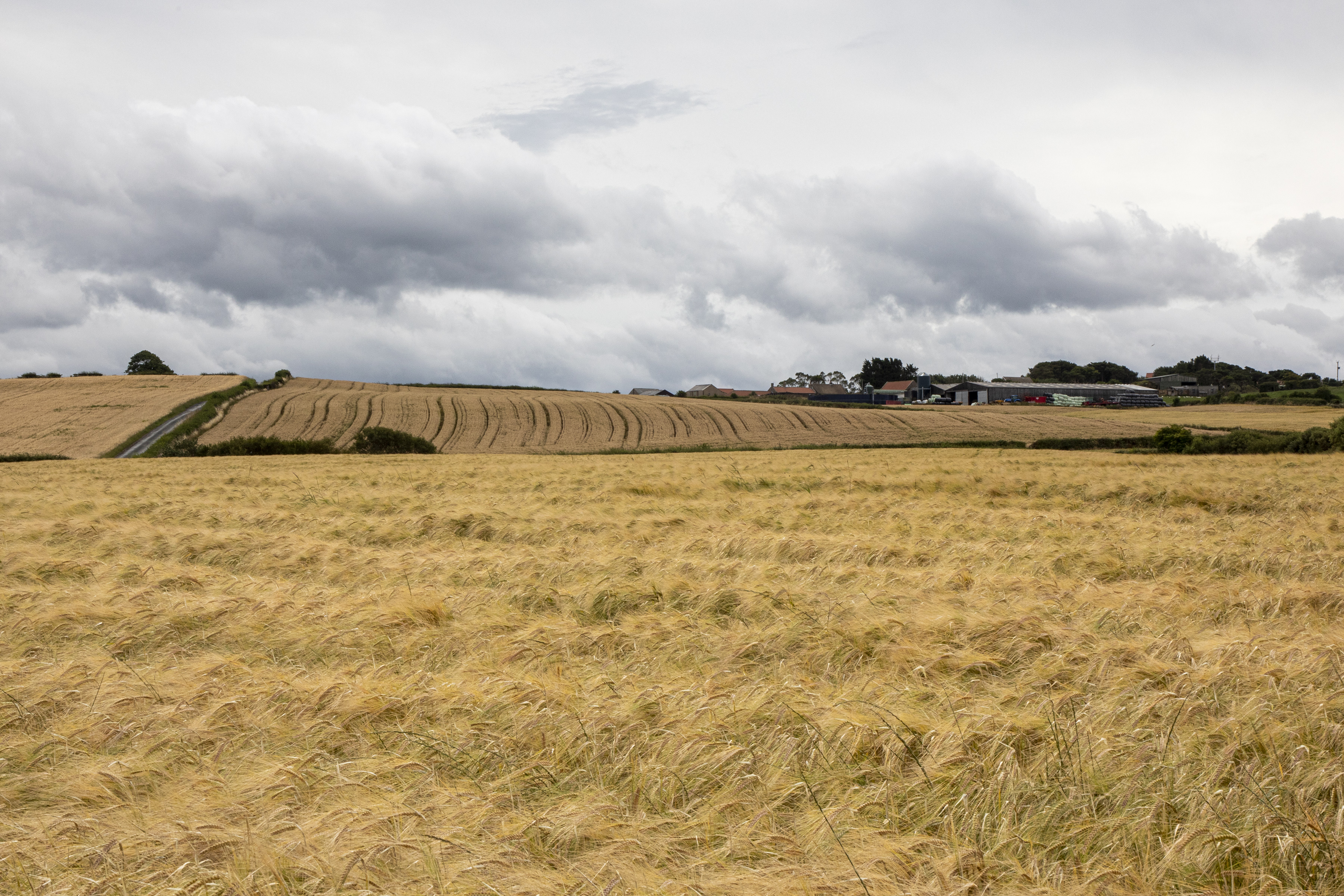
- Farm buildings in the hamlet of Raw

- Location within North Yorkshire
- OS grid reference: NZ936053
- Civil parish: Fylingdales; Hawsker-cum-Stainsacre
- Unitary authority: North Yorkshire
- Ceremonial county: North Yorkshire
- Region: Yorkshire and the Humber
- Country: England
- Sovereign state: United Kingdom
- Post town: WHITBY
- Postcode district: YO22
- Police: North Yorkshire
- Fire: North Yorkshire
- Ambulance: Yorkshire
- UK Parliament: Scarborough and Whitby

Raw is a hamlet in the county of North Yorkshire, England, near to the villages of Fylingthorpe, Robin Hood's Bay, and Hawsker. The hamlet is mostly agricultural in nature and it lies 0.5-mile (0.8 km) north-west of Fylingthorpe, 4.5 miles (7.2 km) south-east of Whitby, and due east of the A171 road.

== History ==
The hamlet of Raw is believed to have been settled around the year 1000 by Norwegians and Danes. Later, after the Conquest and an uprising, the land is thought to have been laid to waste by William the Conqueror. The hamlet is thought to have housed the first dwellings in the area when the settlers were only part-time fishermen. In 1563, the manor of Fyling Raw, along with Fylingthorpe, was bought by Sir Richard Cholmley, who then owned most of the land in the wapentake of Whitby Strand. An inquiry by Queen Elizabeth I in 1588 about possible warnings of the Spanish Armada, reported that Filingdaill (Fylingdales) had three beacons, one of which is believed to be Beacon Hill (625 feet (191 m) above Ordnance Datum) next to the hamlet of Raw. By the 19th century, hamlets around Robin Hood's Bay (Thorp, Raw and Normanby) were the agricultural areas to Robin Hood's Bay's maritime industry.

Originally, the hamlet was known as Row (i.e. a row of houses), and appeared as such on a map from 1775. At some point, this was changed to Fyling Rawe, and then Raw. It is listed as Row in the History and Topography of the City of York: and the North Riding of Yorkshire, and mapping from 1910 shows it as Row. (Note: Several names are recorded for the hamlet; Row, Raw, Fyling Rawe, Thorp Rawe. A Parliamentary Poor Law Union report from 1862 lists it as Rawe.) Quarries to the west of Raw used to provide raw materials for a brick and tile works in the hamlet. In February 1943, a Wellington aircraft on a training flight crashed at Skerry Hall farm, south of the hamlet. All of the aircrew survived.

The hamlet consists of 19 dwellings, which are located wholly within the parish of Fylingdales, however, the land in the village is split between the parishes of Fylingdales and Hawsker-cum-Stainsacre. The moorland to the east and south of Raw is maintained by the Manor of Fyling Court Leet, and is designated as an SSSI.

The former parish church for Fylingdales, Church of St Stephen, which sits on the hill overlooking Fylingthorpe, is sometimes labelled as being in Raw, due to its proximity to the hamlet.

== Governance ==
Historically in the wapentake of Whitby Strand, the North Riding of Yorkshire, and wholly within the ecclesiastical parish, and township of Fylingdales, (Note: In the 1871 census, the township of Fylingdales consisted of; Thorp (Fylingthorpe), Robin Hood's Bay, Normanby, Raw, and Stone Brow. Raw is listed as a village, and Normanby and Stone Brow as hamlets.) the hamlet now straddles the boundary between two modern-day parishes. Raw was part of the Borough of Scarborough between 1974 and 2023. It is now administered by the unitary North Yorkshire Council, and lies wholly within the North York Moors National Park. It is within the Scarborough and Whitby constituency for the UK Government. The census returns for the hamlet in 1851, lists 143 people living there. The modern day population statistics are included in its two parishes, which in 2015 numbered 1,330 in Fylingdales, and 850 in Hawsker-cum-Stainsacre.

== See also ==
- Listed buildings in Fylingdales
