= Robin Hood's Bay Museum =

Museum in North Yorkshire, England

Coordinates: 54°25′50″N 0°32′00″W

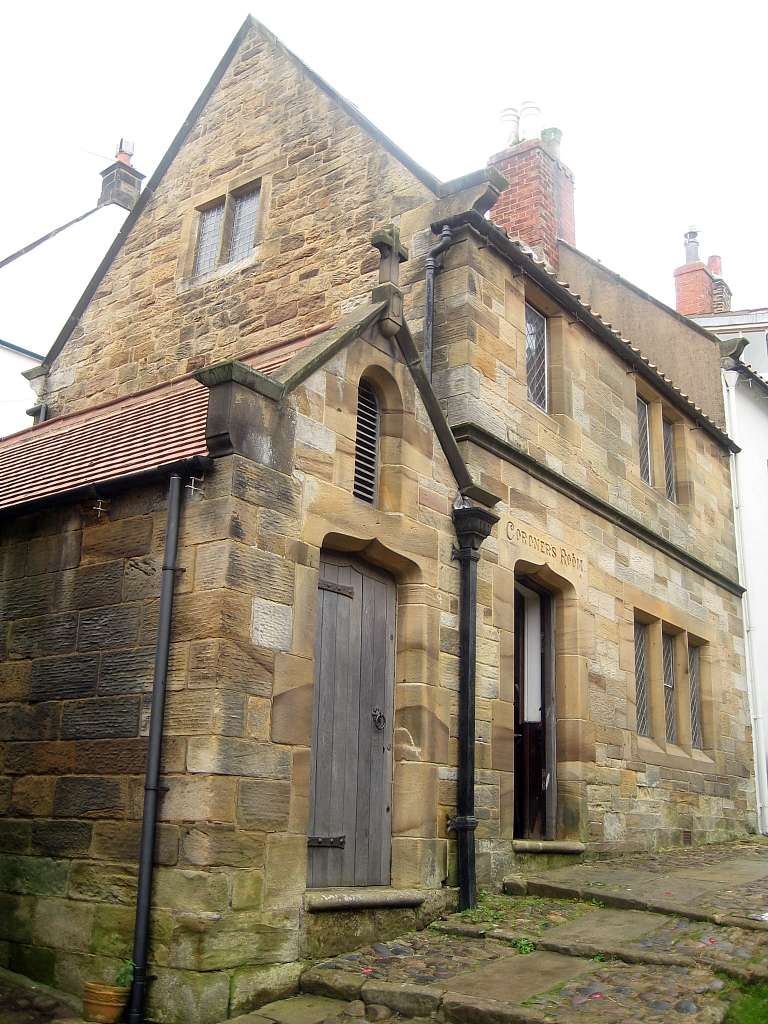
The museum, in 2012

Robin Hood's Bay Museum is a museum in a historic building in Robin Hood's Bay, a village in North Yorkshire, in England.

The building was originally constructed as a cottage, possibly in the 17th century. In 1891, it was purchased by R. J. Cooper, the vicar of St Stephen's Church, Fylingdales, who converted the downstairs room into space for a coroner, and added an extension to house a mortuary. By 1900, it had been wholly remodelled, and it was used as a library and reading room, while still remaining available for use by a coroner. The library closed in 1987, and the building became a museum. It houses a collection of material relating to the history of the village. The building has been grade II listed since 1969.

The building is constructed of stone with a string course, and a swept pantile roof with a stone ridge, and coping and a kneeler on the left. There are two storeys and two bays, and a single-storey entrance bay on the left. To the left of the main block is a doorway with a hollow-chamfered surround and a flattened ogee lintel. Above is a single-light window, and in the right bay are mullioned windows. The entrance bay is gabled and contains a similar doorway, above which is a round-headed window and a cross finial.

== See also ==
- Listed buildings in Fylingdales
