= Thorpe Hall =

Thorpe Hall may refer to:

- Thorpe Hall, Fylingthorpe, 17th century house in North Yorkshire, England
- Thorpe Hall (Peterborough), 17th century mansion in Cambridgeshire, England
- Thorpe Hall (Thorpe-le-Soken), former manor and 19th century villa in Essex, England
- Thorpe Hall (Thorpe Salvin), ruins of Grade II* listed 16th century manor house in South Yorkshire, England
- Thorpe Hall School, independent school in Southend-on-Sea, Essex, England
- Thorpe Hall, a Grade II* listed building in Rudston, East Riding of Yorkshire, bequeathed to Godfrey Macdonald, 3rd Baron Macdonald of Sleat and his descendants

== See also ==
- Thorpe Constantine Hall, Staffordshire, England
