= Farsyde House =

Farmhouse in North Yorkshire, England

General information
- Type: Manor farmhouse
- Architectural style: Vernacular North York Moors / Jacobean
- Location: Mark Lane, Fylingthorpe, Fylingdales, North Yorkshire, England
- Coordinates: 54.4260°N 0.5370°W
- Grid position: NZ 95020 04390
- Construction started: 16th century
- Owner: Private

Technical details
- Material: Coursed roughly-tooled sandstone, pantile roof

Listed Building – Grade II*
- Designated: 4 January 1990
- Reference no.: 1167925

Farsyde House is a Grade II* listed 16th-century manor farmhouse situated on Mark Lane in Fylingthorpe, within the civil parish of Fylingdales, North Yorkshire, England. Serving historically as the ancestral seat of the Farsyde family, it is notable for its well-preserved 16th- and 17th-century masonry, stone mullioned fenestration, and intact internal woodwork.

== History ==
The core of the house dates from the 16th century. In 1670, the building underwent a significant refurbishment and expansion for the Farsyde family, which included the addition of a small entrance extension extruded from the northern angle of the main T-shaped plan and the potential refronting of the primary west elevation.

The doorway lintel on the 1670 extension bears three sets of carved family initials: W & VF, IF, and E & MF, alongside the 1670 date. The roof was rebuilt in the early 19th century, and the former agricultural outbuildings surrounding the courtyard were later converted into residential cottages.

Farsyde House was designated as a Grade II* listed building on 4 January 1990 under National Heritage List for England entry 1167925.

== Architecture ==
The building is constructed from coursed, roughly-tooled sandstone set on a chamfered plinth, capped by a pantiled roof with stone ridges, broad copings, and rolled kneelers. It is laid out on a T-shaped plan facing west, featuring a prominent, massive external chimney stack at its northern end.

=== Exterior ===
The principal elevation to the west comprises two storeys and an attic across three slightly irregular bays. It features two-, three-, and four-light stone-mullioned windows with glazing-bar casements, alongside a single Yorkshire sash window on the upper right bay and a modern three-light dormer set into the roof. The east, and rear, elevation contains a 16-pane sash window to the left, chamfered stone-mullioned openings, and visible traces of an earlier blocked window. The 1670 north-side entrance extension retains a blocked ovolo-moulded window beneath a hoodmould, a small casement window above, and the inscribed lintel over the doorway (now sheltered within a 20th-century glazed porch).

=== Interior ===
The interior preserves key structural and decorative elements from the 17th and early 18th centuries. It contains heavy ovolo-moulded ceiling beams and joists associated with the 1670 alterations, alongside a broad-chamfered beam in the primary chimney bay. It features panelled timber partitions, wood panelling framing the main hearth, and large internal timber window shutters. It also retains a closed-string staircase dating from the early 18th century.

== See also ==
- Grade II* listed buildings in North Yorkshire (district)
- Listed buildings in Fylingdales
