= Pigpen (disambiguation) =

A pigpen is literally an enclosure that holds pigs, also known as a sty. Metaphorically, it may be used as a derogatory way to refer to a person or place as unclean or messy. Pigpen may refer to:

- Pig-Pen, a character in Charles M. Schulz's comic strip Peanuts
- Pigpen cipher, a substitution cypher in which the English letters are replaced with symbols that correspond to an easy-to-generate key
- Ron "Pigpen" McKernan (1945–1973), a founding member of the Grateful Dead
- Pig Pen, a character in the 1978 film Convoy

== See also ==
- Pigsty (disambiguation)
