= Fylingdales =

Civil parish in North Yorkshire, England

Coordinates: 54.412°N 0.569°W

- Civil parish
- Fylingdales parish highlighted in red and land common to Fylingdales and Hawsker-cum-Stainsacre parishes highlighted in pink
- Population: 1,346 (2011 census)
- OS grid reference: NZ951033
- Civil parish: Fylingdales
- Unitary authority: North Yorkshire
- Ceremonial county: North Yorkshire
- Region: Yorkshire and the Humber
- Country: England
- Sovereign state: United Kingdom
- Post town: Whitby
- Postcode district: YO22
- Police: North Yorkshire
- Fire: North Yorkshire
- Ambulance: Yorkshire
- UK Parliament: Scarborough and Whitby

Fylingdales is a civil parish in North Yorkshire, England situated south of Whitby, within the North York Moors National Park. It contains the villages of Robin Hood's Bay and Fylingthorpe and Fyling Hall School.

According to the 2011 UK census, Fylingdales parish had a population of 1,346, a reduction on the 2001 UK census figure of 1,485.

== History ==
Now similar to Fyllingsdalen, Fylingdales was recorded as Figclinge in the 11th century, Figelinge, Figelingam and Fielinge in the 11th and 12th centuries and possibly as Saxeby in the 12th century. The name derives from Fygla's people. It was a parochial chapelry south of Whitby and contained the villages of Robin Hood's Bay and Thorpe, or Fylingthorpe (which was recorded as Prestethorpe in the 13th century) and the hamlets of Normanby, Parkgate, Ramsdale, Raw (Fyling Rawe, 16th century) and Stoupe Brow. The church, dedicated to St Stephen, replaced an ancient chapel which had Saxon origins and was demolished in about 1821. It was a dependent chapel of Whitby Abbey.

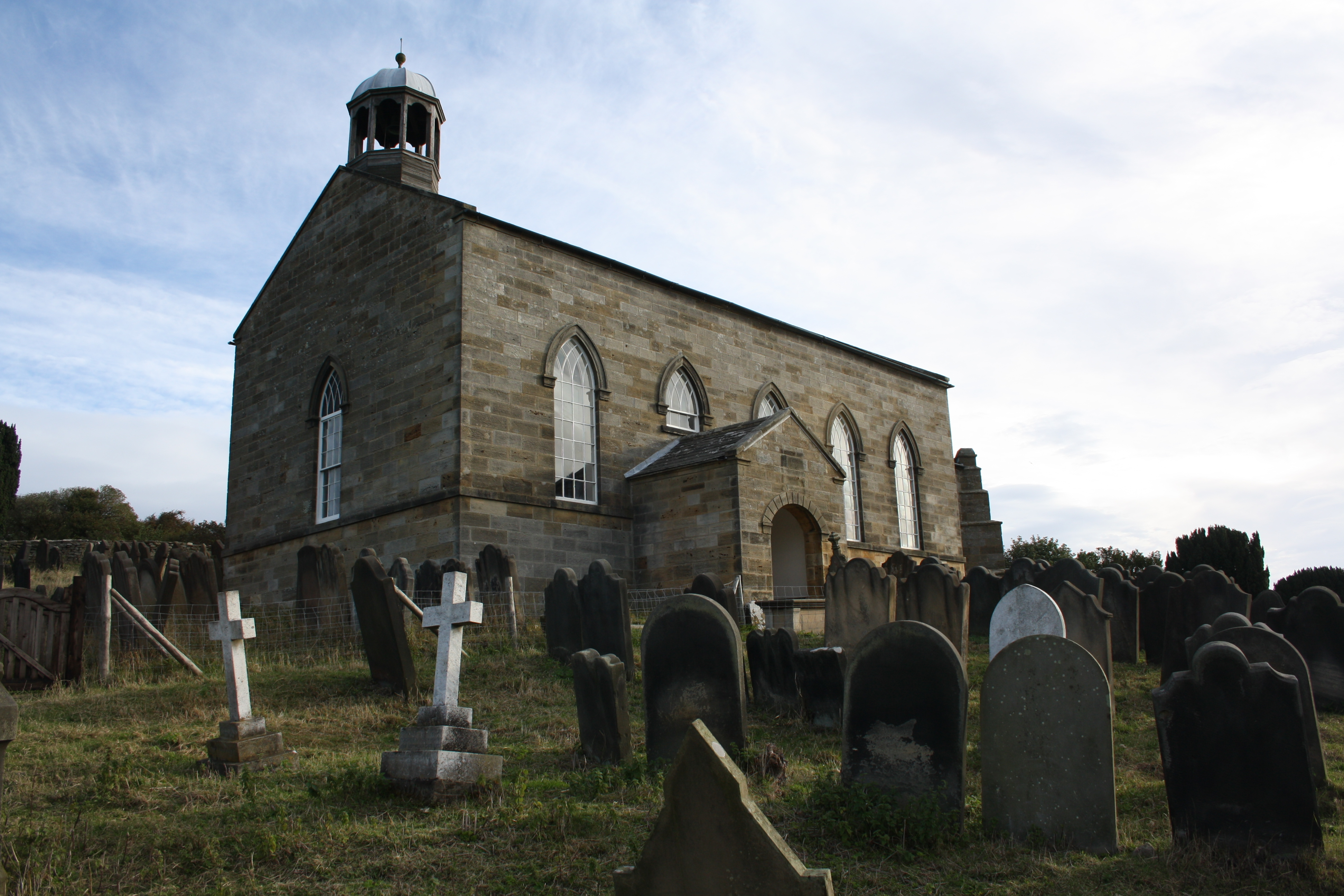
The older St Stephen's Church

Fyling Old Hall is in Fylingthorpe not far from the Fyling Beck and was leased by the abbey in 1539. It is built in sandstone with a slate roof and mullioned windows. Sir Hugh Cholmley sold Fyling Hall in 1634 to Sir John Hotham whose descendants held the estate including the hall and mill until the 18th century.

The moor within the parishes of Fylingdales and Hawsker-cum-Stainsacre is managed by the ancient Manor of Fyling Court Leet. Courts Leet can be traced to Norman times, and the Manor of Fyling Court Leet was mentioned and recognised in the Administration of Justices Act 1977 to continue to transact the "Management of the Commons in the Manor".

From 1974 to 2023 it was part of the Borough of Scarborough. It is now administered by the unitary North Yorkshire Council.

== Geography ==
The area of Fylingdales is 13,325 acres (5,392 ha) of land and inland water. The chief crops grown were barley and oats but most of the land was in pasture or moorland. The cliffs are Upper Lias shale capped by Dogger and False Bedded Sandstones and shales of the Lower Oolite. The height varies from 75 feet (23 m) to 100 feet (30 m) above the ordnance datum on the cliffs to 775 feet (236 m) on the moors. Alum was worked at Stoupe Brow and Peak. There were brick and tile-works at High Normanby and at Quarry Hill, Raw.

The moorland has been designated a Site of Special Scientific Interest (SSSI) and is managed by the Manor Court.

=== Climate ===
Climate data for Fylingdales (North Yorkshire): elevation: 262 m (860 ft) Average maximum and minimum temperatures, and average rainfall recorded between 1991 and 2020 by the Met Office. Sunshine hours are for Scarborough, as no data has been recorded at Fylingdales.
Month	Jan	Feb	Mar	Apr	May	Jun	Jul	Aug	Sep	Oct	Nov	Dec	Year
Mean daily maximum °C (°F)	5.1 (41.2)	5.7 (42.3)	7.9 (46.2)	10.6 (51.1)	13.6 (56.5)	16.3 (61.3)	18.7 (65.7)	18.3 (64.9)	15.6 (60.1)	11.8 (53.2)	8.0 (46.4)	5.5 (41.9)	11.5 (52.7)
Mean daily minimum °C (°F)	0.4 (32.7)	0.3 (32.5)	1.9 (35.4)	3.2 (37.8)	5.7 (42.3)	8.5 (47.3)	10.6 (51.1)	10.6 (51.1)	8.8 (47.8)	6.1 (43.0)	3.0 (37.4)	0.7 (33.3)	4.96 (40.93)
Average precipitation mm (inches)	85.3 (3.36)	74.7 (2.94)	66.6 (2.62)	69.2 (2.72)	55.6 (2.19)	86.1 (3.39)	66.0 (2.60)	82.8 (3.26)	81.2 (3.20)	96.3 (3.79)	119.0 (4.69)	97.0 (3.82)	979.7 (38.57)
Average precipitation days (≥ 1.0 mm)	14.9	13.3	11.4	10.8	10.1	11.5	10.5	11.8	11.6	14.6	15.7	15.1	151.3
Mean monthly sunshine hours	56.3	83.5	117.9	164.8	213.8	189.3	201.3	188.5	142.5	101.9	64.9	54.2	1,578.8
Source 1: Met Office
Source 2: Met Office

During a prolonged period of heavy rain across England in September 2024, Fylingdales saw its September monthly average of 81 millimetres (3.2 in) of rain falling in just two days.

== RAF Fylingdales ==
The Tri-Partite site known as RAF Fylingdales is named after the place but is not actually in the parish. Originally planned to be built on a site at Grouse Hill within Fylingdales, the site was moved due to coastal erosion concerns, and the name was not changed as it was preferable to being called RAF Snod Hill (Snod Hill is where it is actually located) and it sits at the western edge of Fylingdales Moor.

== Sport ==
Fylingdales Cricket Club is in Middlewood Lane, about one kilometre south east of Fylingthorpe village. The club have two senior teams: a Saturday 1st XI that compete in the Scarborough Beckett Cricket League, a Midweek Senior XI in the Esk Valley Evening League and a junior section that compete in the Derwent Valley Junior Cricket League.

== See also ==
- Listed buildings in Fylingdales
- The Fylingdales Group of Artists
