= Ramsdale Beck =

Watercourse in North Yorkshire, England

- Ramsdale Mill

- Location within North Yorkshire
- Etymology: Old English Garlic valley

Location
- Village: Fylingthorpe
- County: North Yorkshire
- Country: England

Physical characteristics
- Source
  - location: Kirk Moor
  - coordinates: 54.412°N 0.589°W
  - elevation: 181 metres (594 ft)
- Mouth
  - location: Boggle Hole
  - coordinates: 54.423°N 0.529°W
  - elevation: 2 metres (6 ft 7 in)

Ramsdale Beck is a small river that feeds directly into the North Sea at Boggle Hole, between Robin Hood's Bay and Ravenscar on the North Yorkshire coast in England. The stream, which rises on Fylingdales Moor, has two waterfalls, and historically was used to power two corn mills. The beck flows through a small ravine known as Ramsdale Valley. There is another Ramsdale Beck in Scarborough which connects Scarborough Mere and Falsgrave to the sea.

== Etymology ==
Ramsdale, which applies to the beck, the hamlet and the mill in the valley, was first recorded in 1210 as Ramesdale. The name shares similarities with Ramsey in Cambridgeshire and they have derived from the Old English hramse or ramese, meaning garlic. Wild garlic, or ramson, is known to be prolific within the valley, even into the modern day. One of the derivations of the surname Ramsdale can be traced back to those who lived in the valley.

== History and course ==
Ramsdale Beck begins on Kirk Moor as several streams, coming together just to the west of the A171 road as Kirk Moor Beck. It then heads due east through Leith Rigg, Ramsdale, then entering the North Sea at Boggle Hole as Mill Beck. It drops from 181 metres (594 ft) at source to just 2 metres (6 ft 7 in) above sea level at Boggle Hole, (Note: The name of Boggle Hole is said to derive from a tale about a hobgoblin who lived in a hole at that location.) which is about 1-mile (1.6 km) south of Robin Hood's Bay.

The beck flows through a narrow ravine known as Ramsdale Valley, which is lined with woodland. The bedrock underneath (and in places exposed by) the stream, is a mixture of grey limestone and ironstone deposits - the ironstone belonging to the Dogger formation known in the area. The two types of rock near the surface have allowed the water to carve and erode away sections to provide the beck with two waterfalls; one at Ramsdale Mill and the other further upstream called Stevenson's Piece.

The beck and the surrounding woods belonged to Whitby Abbey until the Dissolution, forming part of the great hunting ground known as Fyling Park (or Buck Park) which was used by royalty for hunting deer. The walls of the park and Demesne Farm are visible on old maps. The boggy nature of the narrow valley made the upkeep of the park difficult. The source of the beck at Kirk Moor was also once the gathering point for fresh water for Robin Hood's Bay. Kirk Moor was historically known as Ramsdale Moor.

There are five bridged crossings of the beck; (from west to east), the A171 road, Ramsdale Mill, Fyling Hall Road, the Cinder Track, and a footbridge at the mouth of the beck at Boggle Hole which carries the Cleveland Way.

== Industry ==
The beck had two corn mills, one at Ramsdale hamlet (called Ramsdale Mill), and another at the mouth of the beck where it enters the North Sea (called Bay Mill), which is now the Boggle Hole Youth Hostel. The old mill at Boggle Hole is of uncertain date being first recorded in 1666, but a sign indicates it was rebuilt in 1839. The mill at Ramsdale hamlet was the property of Whitby Abbey (before the Dissolution) according to a 17th century document, and the mill part of the building was rebuilt between 1857 and 1859. It is now a private dwelling with the 30-foot (9.1 m) waterwheel still in place. Both mills were destroyed by extensive flooding on the beck in 1857.

The redundant waterwheel at Ramsdale Mill was repaired into good working order in 1935 for the film Turn of the Tide, which was set in Robin Hood's Bay. In one scene, two of the main characters are shown attempting to catch migrating salmon in the beck.

There is another Ramsdale Beck in the former Borough of Scarborough (in Scarborough itself), which was the conduit from the Mere, to the sea via Falsgrave. Like its similarly named counterpart, it too was used for powering corn mills.

== Flora and fauna ==
The beck has been noted for salmonoid migration and also for several sightings of otters. Salmon were known to travel upstream to a pool to spawn in the 1850s. A naturalists examination of the area in 1933 noted large swathes of Tetrodontium brownianum on the sides of the beck.
