= The Bay Hotel =

Listed pub in North Yorkshire, England

Bay Hotel
- The Bay Hotel, Robin Hood's Bay
- Interactive map of the Bay Hotel area
- Former names: New Inn

General information
- Location: The Dock, Robin Hood's Bay, North Yorkshire, England
- Coordinates: 54.4304°N 0.5321°W
- Ordnance Survey: NZ953048
- Opened: 1843; 183 years ago

Design and construction
- Designations

Listed Building – Grade II
- Official name: The Bay Hotel
- Designated: 6 October 1969
- Reference no.: 1148713

The Bay Hotel is a Grade II listed public house on The Dock in Robin Hood's Bay, North Yorkshire, England. The pub is known for being a destination for coast-to-coast walkers, for once being washed into the sea (then rebuilt), and also for having its windows wrecked by the bowsprit of ship during a heavy storm. The Bay Hotel stands at the very edge of the sea wall at Robin Hood's Bay facing out towards the sea, and is the second inn to be sited at that location.

== History ==
A public house was first recorded on the site in 1828 as the New Inn. That building is also recorded as having been washed into the North Sea in 1843. The current building was built in the 1860s and "the sea washes its outer wall at high tide." It is unknown exactly if any structural damage occurred, but in November 1893, The Romulus was wrecked on the rocks at Robin Hood's Bay during a storm, and the ships' bowsprit, or topsail yardarm, pierced the glass of the windows in the Bay Hotel. A similar event occurred in 1878 when a ship wrecked in the bay smashed the building's windows due to the eastern frontage looking out immediately over the sea wall. The rebuilt 1860s building was said to have "throbbed throughout" when the high tide lashed against its walls, but it had some protection in the form of a buttress protruding out onto the beach. The site around the hotel was reinforced in 1974 by a concrete sea wall.

The Bay Hotel used its own horses and stables until 1920 when the brewery owning the pub changed hands from Nesfields Brewery (Scarborough), to the Moor & Robson's Brewery (Hull). The stables were then repurposed in the same year to become part of the Bay Hotel, with a second storey added on top of the stable block. During the North Sea Flood of 1953, the hotel was entirely surrounded by water.

The pub is located adjacent to the Way Foot, a cobbled slipway that connects the beach with the road leading through the village. Due to the Bay Hotel's proximity to the beach and water, it is often used as a restpoint for walkers completing the Coast to Coast walking route, who after dipping their boots into the North Sea, go to the pub to sign the visitor's book and buy a certificate of completion. The basement–level bar in the pub is named the "Wainwright Bar" in honour of Alfred Wainwright, the creator of the coast–to–coast walk, and a plaque is affixed to an external wall marking the end of the 192 miles (309 km) route. The Robin Hood's Bay Folk Club have a regular meet and performance in the Wainwright Bar each week. The Cleveland Way also passes close to the pub, with some walkers opting to pass by the hotel, and along the beach to Boggle Hole (tides permitting), rather than use the official path on the clifftop.

The Bay Hotel has also been host to the ancient Court leet of Fylingdales, which is still extant today and deals mostly with land enclosure issues. It was also featured in the film the Turn of the Tide, the first picture produced by The Rank Organisation. The Bay Hotel is located within the Robin Hood's Bay conservation area, and is also a Grade II listed building.

== See also ==
- Listed buildings in Fylingdales
