= Pigsty (disambiguation) =

A pigsty is an enclosure for raising pigs. Pigsty may also refer to:

- Pigsty (film), a 1969 Italian film
- The Pigsty, a folly in North Yorkshire, England
