= United Reformed Church, Robin Hood's Bay =

Church in North Yorkshire, England

Coordinates: 54.4308°N 0.5333°W

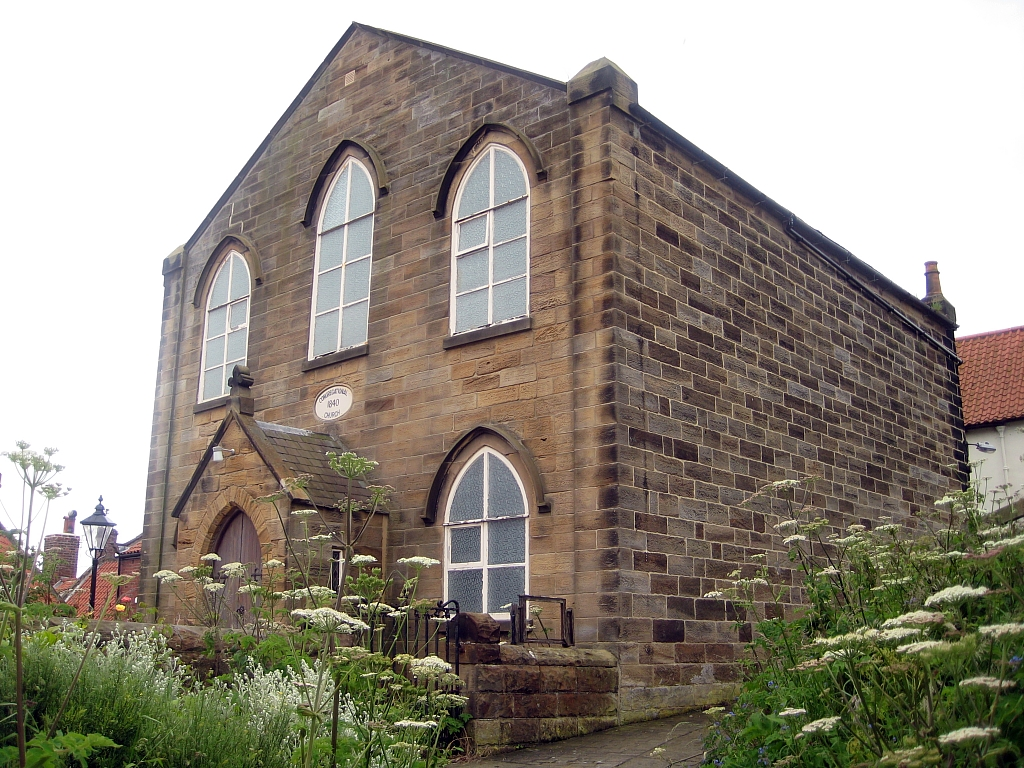
The church, in 2012

The United Reformed Church is a redundant church building in Robin Hood's Bay, a village in North Yorkshire, in England.

The Congregationalist J. C. Potter began preaching in a schoolroom in Robin Hood's Bay in 1838. In 1840, a church building was constructed at Fisher Head, on a prominent site above the beach. It originally accommodated 25 adherents in the village. In 1972, it was part of the majority of the Congregational Church of England and Wales which became part of the new United Reformed Church. The church building was closed and sold in the 21st century, with only one member transferring to Flowergate United Reformed Church in Whitby. The building has been grade II listed since 1969.

The chapel is built of sandstone, and has a Welsh slate roof with stone copings and block kneelers. The entrance front is gabled, and has two storeys and three wide bays. Steps lead up to a central gabled porch with a trefoil finial containing double doors. The windows have pointed arches and hood moulds, and above the porch is an oval plaque with the date and an inscription. Some of the windows contain frosted glass, while the two at the rear have coloured glass which may be original.

== See also ==
- Listed buildings in Fylingdales
