= The Laurel Inn =

Pub in Fylingdales, North Yorkshire, England

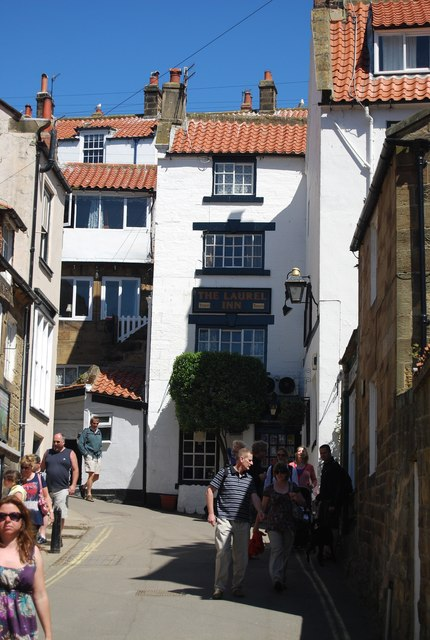
The pub, in 2010

The Laurel Inn is a historic pub in Robin Hood's Bay, a village in North Yorkshire, in England.

The older part of the pub is to the east. It dates from the early 18th century, and was built at the same time as the adjoining Maid Marion cottage. In the early or mid 19th century, the property was extended to the west. The pub was grade II listed in 1969. In 2017, it was described as having "an immaculately kept, beamed bar with a cast-iron range and the open fire roaring".

The older section has incised rendered walls, and the newer part is in sandstone. The roof is in pantile with stone copings and kneelers. The older part has three storeys and its gable end facing the road. The newer part has four storeys and one bay, and it contains a projecting porch. The windows in both parts are sashes, some of them horizontally-sliding.

== See also ==
- Listed buildings in Fylingdales
