= St Stephen's Church, Fylingdales =

Church in England

Coordinates: 54°26′03″N 0°32′21″W

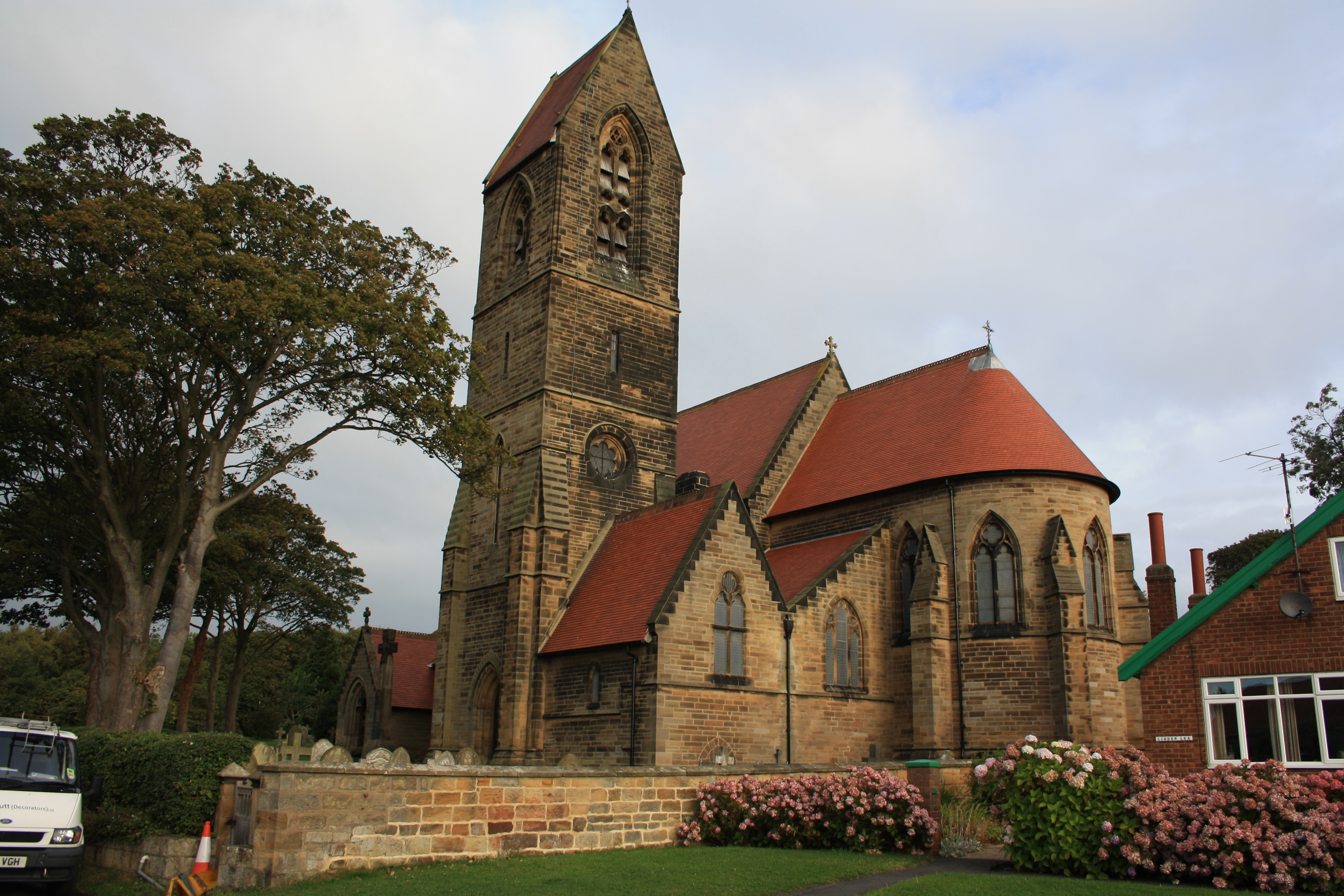
The church in 2010

St Stephen's Church is the parish church of Fylingdales, and lies in Robin Hood's Bay, a village in North Yorkshire, in England.

The church was built between 1868 and 1870, to replace what is now Old St Stephen's Church, Fylingdales, on a more convenient site, close to Robin Hood's Bay railway station. It was designed by George Edmund Street in the Decorated Gothic style. The Victoria County History describes it as "a handsome if somewhat heavy Gothic building", and Historic England as "a highly accomplished design with a good use of space, impressive massing combined with very effective restrained ornamentation that displays a high quality of both materials and craftsmanship". It has remained largely unaltered, and was grade II* listed in 1969.

East end of the church

The church is built of sandstone with a red tile roof and a decorative ridge. It consists of a nave with a clerestory, a south aisle, a south porch, a chancel with a north organ chamber, a south chapel and vestry, and an apse at the east end, and a southeast tower. The tower has four stages, angle buttresses, string courses, lancet windows and a roundel in the second stage, the bell openings have moulded surrounds and hood moulds, and at the top is a saddleback roof. Inside, there are various stained glass windows designed by Henry Holiday, and a cylindrical font which is believed to have come from the village's demolished mediaeval church.

The church is in the benefice of Fylingdales and Hawsker cum Stainsacre.

== See also ==
- Grade II* listed churches in North Yorkshire (district)
- Listed buildings in Fylingdales
