= The Pigsty =

Historic building in North Yorkshire, England

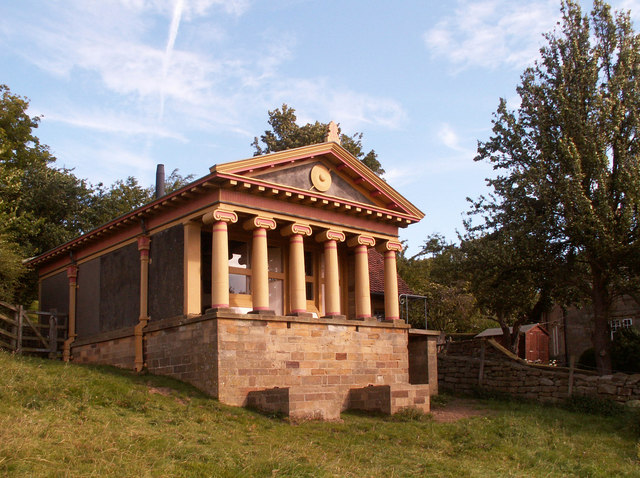
- The Pigsty after restoration in 1998

- Location within North Yorkshire
- 54.4237°N 0.5579°W
- Type: former pigsty, now holiday accommodation
- Location: Fylingthorpe, North Yorkshire

History
- Built: c. 1890

Site notes
- Architectural style: Agricultural structure
- Governing body: Landmark Trust

Listed Building – Grade II*
- Official name: Pigsty to the south of The Cottage
- Designated: 15 April 1988
- Reference no.: 1148678

The Pigsty overlooking Robin Hood Bay in the village of Fylingthorpe, North Yorkshire, England, is an agricultural structure designed for the accommodation of pigs. It was built c. 1890 by the local squire, John Warren Barry of Fyling Hall. After a period of dereliction in the mid-20th century, the pigsty was acquired by the Landmark Trust in 1988. Restored, it now offers accommodation for tourists. The Pigsty is a Grade II* listed building.

== History ==
The date of the building is uncertain. Historic England states 1891, while the Landmark Trust quotes from the recollections of a Matthew Hart, who worked on the construction of the pigsty and dates its commencement to 1888, and its completion in 1891. It further notes a date of 1906 carved on an internal beam in the sty, which may suggest that construction took place over a decade or more. The sty was designed as accommodation for pigs but also has elements of a folly. It was built for John Warren Barry (1851–1920) of Fyling Hall, local squire and Justice of the Peace. Barry had travelled extensively in the Mediterranean, writing a detailed work, Studies in Corsica: Sylvan and Social published in 1893, and had a strong interest in Classical buildings.

After renovation by the Landmark Trust the sty was reopened in 1991 and is available to rent. The Pigsty is a Grade II* listed building.

== Sources ==
- Haslam, Charlotte (2014). The Pigsty History Album (PDF). Maidenhead, Berkshire: Landmark Trust.
