= Fyling Old Hall =

English historic building

Coordinates: 54°24′43″N 0°32′52″W

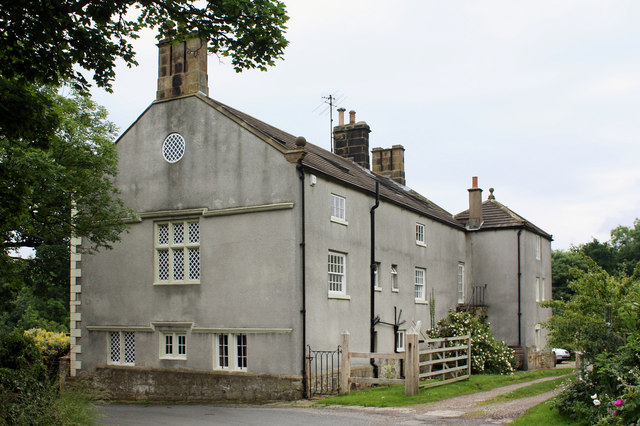
The building, in 2009

Fyling Old Hall is a historic building in Fylingthorpe, a hamlet in North Yorkshire, in England.

The house was originally built in the mediaeval period, and was recorded in 1539 when it was leased by Whitby Abbey. In 1629, it was largely rebuilt by Hugh Cholmeley. In 1634, Cholmeley sold the house to John Hotham, and although Hotham was executed for treason in 1645, the house remained in his family into the 18th century. The property also has a “priests hidey hole” designed to protect catholic priests from being discovered during military searches. In the 1820s, the hall was converted into a farmhouse, with the east front being refaced, and most of the windows replaced. The building was grade II listed in 1969.

The building is constructed of stone, mainly pebbledashed, on a plinth with quoins and some chamfered coping. The roof is in tile with stone copings and kneelers. The house has two storeys and attics, a main front of three bays and a stair tower with a pyramidal roof and a ball finial. The garden front has four bays, and contains a doorway with alternating block jambs, a patterned fanlight, a keystone, a frieze and a hood mould. The windows are sashes with flat heads and keystones. In the right return are mullioned windows with hood moulds, the window in the upper floor is larger with a transom, and in the attic is an oculus. There is a wall round three sides of the garden to the east with wrought iron gates. The inside has been altered, but a 17th-century fireplace survives.

== See also ==
- Listed buildings in Fylingdales
