= Thorpe Hall, Fylingthorpe =

Country house in North Yorkshire, England

Coordinates: 54°25′52″N 0°32′47″W

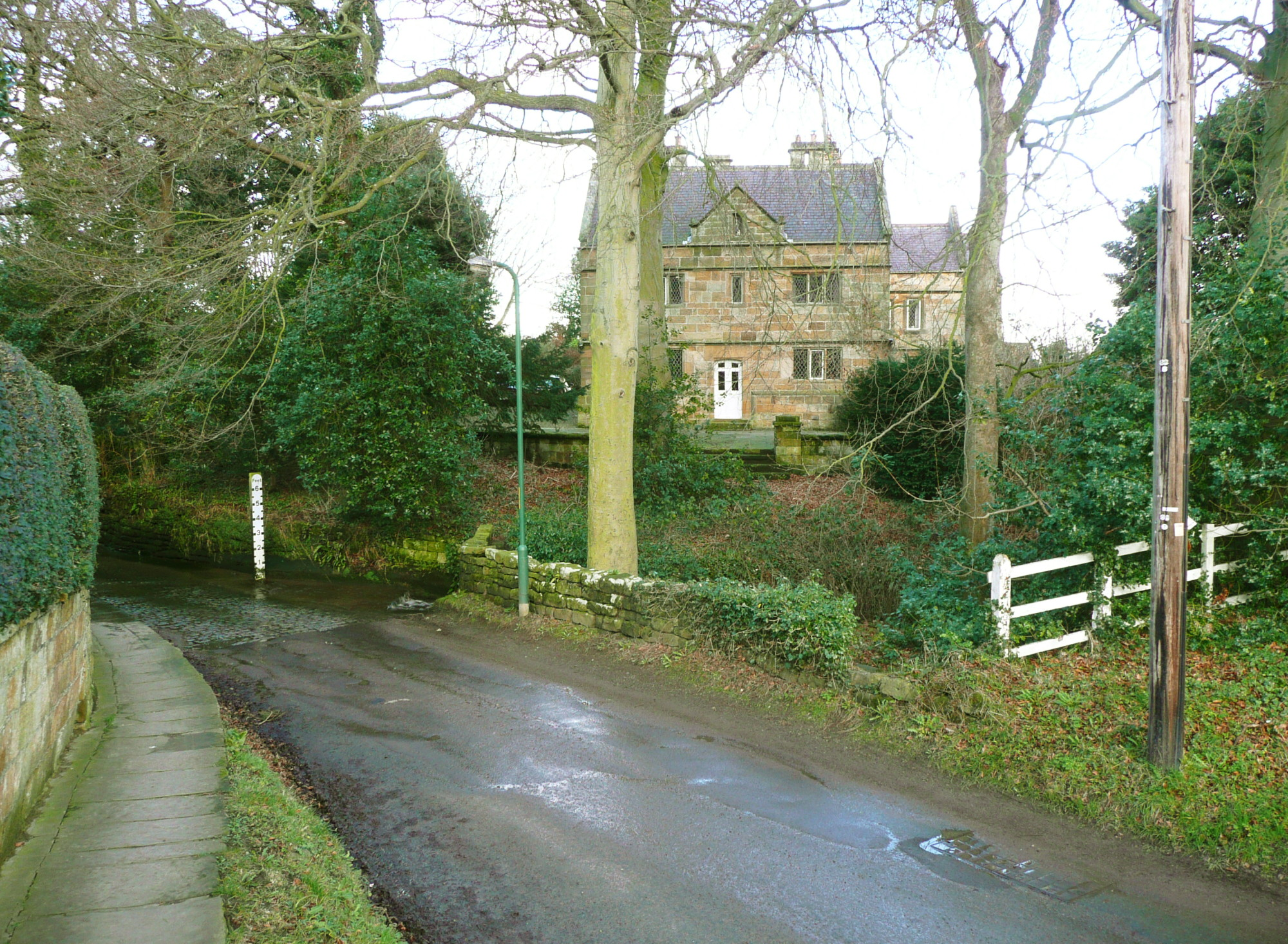
The building, in 2014

Thorpe Hall is a historic building in Fylingthorpe, a village in North Yorkshire, in England.

The house was built for the Fawside family in 1680, as a rectangular building. It was extended in 1835, the new section incorporating an existing building, and extended again in 1844. The Fawsides, later known as the Farsydes, sold the property in 1956. The house featured in an episode of the television programme Coast, which discussed its role in local smuggling during the 18th century; the programme speculated that a wooden container halfway up the stairs and an underground stone chamber in the grounds were used to hide smuggled goods. In 2021, the property was put on the market for £1.5 million, at which time it had ten bedrooms, a coach house and four acres of land. The house has been grade II* listed since 1969.

The house is built of sandstone with quoins, and a Welsh slate roof with stone copings, small gabled kneelers, stone ridges on the older part and tile ridges on the extensions. The original part has two parallel ranges, the 1835 extension is parallel and extended to the south with a porch, and the 1844 extension is a parallel east range linked to the porch. There are two storeys and attics, and an entrance front of three bays, with string courses, and a small central gable with a chamfered slit. In the centre is a doorway with a Tudor arched head, a chamfered surround, and a coat of arms with initials and the date. Above it is a single-light window, and the other windows on the front are double-chamfered and mullioned. Elsewhere, there are more Tudor-arched doorways and coats of arms. Inside, there is much early-20th century woodwork, including a staircase in an earlier style.

== See also ==
- Grade II* listed buildings in North Yorkshire (district)
- Listed buildings in Fylingdales
