= Fylingthorpe =

Village in North Yorkshire, England

Coordinates: 54°25′53″N 0°32′52″W

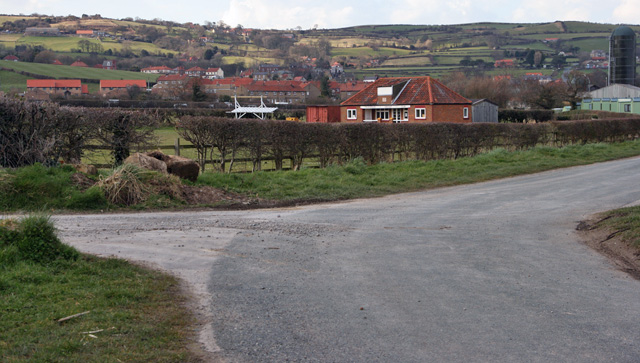
- View of the village

- Location within North Yorkshire
- OS grid reference: NZ 943 050
- Civil parish: Fylingdales
- Unitary authority: North Yorkshire
- Ceremonial county: North Yorkshire
- Region: Yorkshire and the Humber
- Country: England
- Sovereign state: United Kingdom
- Post town: Whitby
- Postcode district: YO22
- Police: North Yorkshire
- Fire: North Yorkshire
- Ambulance: Yorkshire
- UK Parliament: Scarborough and Whitby

Fylingthorpe is a village in the Fylingdales civil parish of North Yorkshire, England. From 1974 to 2023 it was part of the Borough of Scarborough, it is now administered by the unitary North Yorkshire Council.

== Geography ==
Fylingthorpe is located about 1.1 miles (1.8 km) inland from the coast of the North Sea, and about 0.7 mi (1.1 km) from Robin Hood's Bay, the larger of the two settlements within Fylingdales Parish, between 180 ft (55 m) and 656 ft (200 m) above sea level. The country rises sharply west of the village itself towards Fyling Hall school by about 100 m in 1 km.

The underlying geology is boulder clay.

== History ==
Fylingthorpe, then an agglomeration-type settlement, is reported in the Domesday Book of 1086 as "waste" and non-populated. It came under the jurisdiction of William de Percy who between 1091 and 1096 granted it to Whitby Abbey.

The village was originally only known as Thorpe and in the 13th century as Prestethorpe.

The Fawside family, who originated in Scotland and accompanied King James I, had Thorpe Hall mansion built in 1680. They later changed their name into Farsyde and, as lords of Fylingdales Manor, were involved in various conflicts of political, religious, and military nature. They were also involved in shipping and smuggling.

Fyling Hall railway station on the now defunct Scarborough and Whitby Railway served the nearby school from 1885 to 1965, but the village was nearer to the station at Robin Hood's Bay.

In 1923, the boarding school of Fyling Hall was founded in a Georgian country house near the village. It is still in operation.

== Notable buildings ==
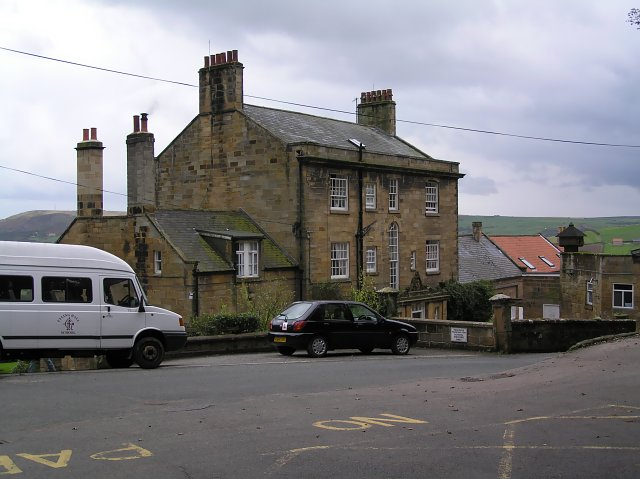
Fyling Hall School

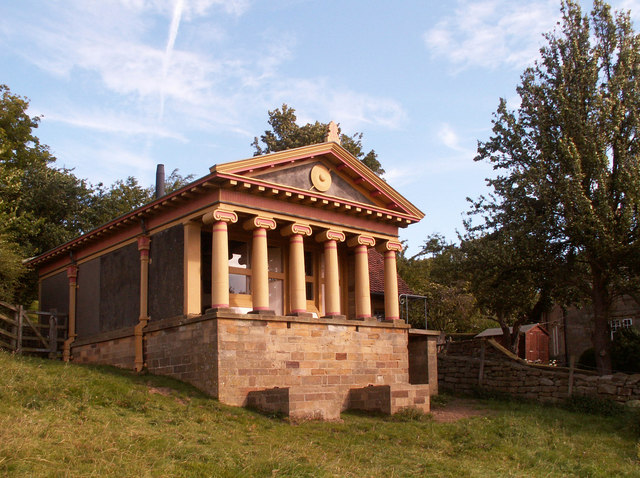
The Pigsty

Thorpe Hall, an Elizabethan mansion built by the Fawside family in 1680 and extended twice in the 19th century, now serves as bed and breakfast accommodation.

The Georgian country house of Fyling Hall, built in 1810 and now the home of Fyling Hall School, replaced an earlier hall where in 1632 the politician Sir Hugh Cholmeley was born.

St Stephen's Old Church north of the village, a chapel of ease which contains memorials for shipwrecked sailors, was built in 1821 as a preaching church, replacing a predecessor. It is a Grade I listed building.

The "Pigsty" is an architectural folly south of Fyling Hall, built in the late 19th century as pig stables in a neoclassical style by John Barry, a shipowner and resident of the mansion, and is now rented out as holiday accommodation by the Landmark Trust.

== See also ==
- Listed buildings in Fylingdales
