= Fyling Hall School =

Fyling Hall
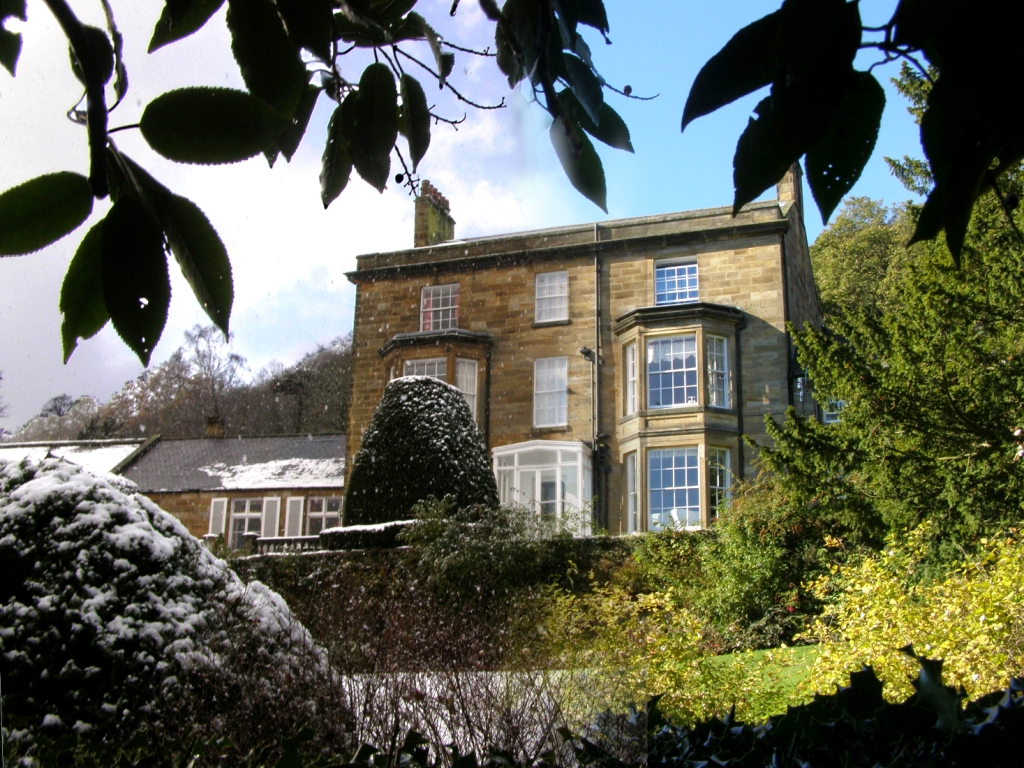
- Main House in winter and in summer

Location
- Robin Hood's Bay, North Yorkshire, YO22 4QD; England; 54.425560°N 0.557540°W

Information
- Type: Private day and boarding school
- Motto: 'The days that make us happy make us wise'
- Established: 1923
- Founder: Mab Bradley
- Department for Education URN: 121733 Tables
- Headmaster: Steve Allen
- Gender: Coeducational
- Age: 4 to 18
- Enrolment: 180~
- Former Pupils: Old Fylinghallers
- Website: http://www.fylinghall.org

Fyling Hall is a private, co-educational day and boarding school situated near the small village of Fylingthorpe, near Robin Hood's Bay, 7 miles (11 km) south east of Whitby, North Yorkshire, England. Founded in 1923 by Mab Bradley, the school was then run for thirty years by her daughter, Clare White. The school is centred on a Georgian country house that dates from 1819 and is situated in 45 acres (180,000 m^{2}) of wooded hillside within the North York Moors National Park.

== History ==
There was a hall in 1632 when Sir Hugh Cholmeley, 4th Baronet was born here. However the present building dates from around 1819 and is grade II listed.

== School motto ==
The school motto is 'The days that make us happy make us wise'.

== Sports ==
Fyling Hall School offers a wide variety of sports for pupils.

== Popular culture ==
The main building of Fyling Hall is used in G.P Taylor's novel Shadowmancer as the vicarage of Obadiah Demurral. The vicarage is destroyed by cannon fire from Jacob Crane's smuggler ship 'The Magenta'.

== Notable former pupils ==
- Eliza Carthy
- Michael Dickinson
- Ryan Gibson
- Philip Hayton
- Jamie Noon

== Notable former teachers ==
- Alex Thomson
