= Old St Stephen's Church, Fylingdales =

Coordinates: 54.4402°N 0.5497°W

- Old St Stephen's Church, Fylingdales

- Location in North Yorkshire
- OS grid reference: NZ 941 059
- Location: Robin Hood's Bay, North Yorkshire
- Country: England
- Denomination: Anglican
- Website: Churches Conservation Trust

History
- Dedication: Saint Stephen

Architecture
- Functional status: Redundant
- Heritage designation: Grade I
- Designated: 6 October 1969
- Architectural type: Church
- Style: Gothic Revival
- Completed: 1822
- Closed: 1870

Specifications
- Materials: Sandstone, slate roof

Old St Stephen's Church is a redundant Anglican church standing on a hillside in Fylingdales, overlooking Robin Hood's Bay, North Yorkshire, England. It is recorded in the National Heritage List for England as a designated Grade I listed building, and is under the care of the Churches Conservation Trust.

== History ==
The church was built in 1822 replacing an older church; a church has been present on the site since the medieval era. This church closed in 1870 when it was superseded by the new St Stephen's Church, on a new site near the railway station. The old church was vested in the Trust on 1 December 1986.

The church has been semi-converted inside to make it habitable for campers (or what travel-writers and the Church of England are calling Champing).

== Architecture ==
=== Exterior ===
The church is constructed in sandstone with a purple slate roof. It is a simple building comprising a single-cell "preaching box", with a six-bay nave, a small sanctuary, a south porch and a north vestry. At the west end of the church is a bell-cupola. The architectural style of the church is Neoclassical. Above the porch is a sundial bearing the dates 1736, 1864 and 1919. Inside the porch are wooden benches. In the walls of the nave are windows with pointed arches. There is a square-headed door in the south wall of the sanctuary. The east window is similar to those in the nave, and it is flanked by diagonal buttresses. In the wall of the vestry is a 15-pane window.

=== Interior ===
The interior of the church contains its original Georgian fittings. These include a panelled gallery on the north and west sides that is carried by Doric columns, a triple decker pulpit on the south wall with a sounding board, and box pews. One of these pews carries the name and the coat of arms of the Farsyde family. There are also memorial tablets to members of the Farsyde family. The font dates from the early 18th century.

== See also ==
- Grade I listed buildings in North Yorkshire (district)
- List of churches preserved by the Churches Conservation Trust in Northern England
