= Robin Hood's Bay Marine Laboratory =

Research unit in North Yorkshire, England

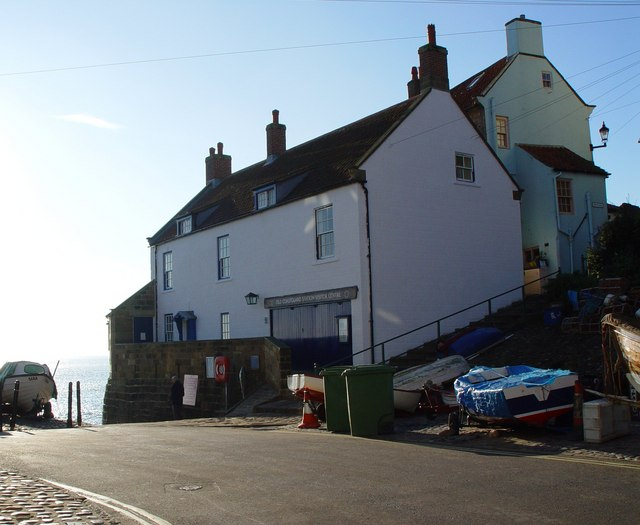
- Old Coastguard Station Visitor Centre
- Established: 1912; 114 years ago
- Research type: Marine scientific research and education unit
- Location: Robin Hood's Bay, England; 54°25′48.6″N 0°31′55.9″W
- Operating agency: National Trust

Map
- Location within North Yorkshire

The Robin Hood's Bay Marine Laboratory was a marine scientific research and education unit in North Yorkshire, England, from 1912 to 1982. Purchased in 1998 by the National Trust, the previous structure was demolished, and the present building constructed to the style of the old coastguard station and opened as a visitor and interpretation centre.

== Site ==
The village of Robin Hood's Bay (known locally as Baytown) is situated on the north side of a wide sweeping bay about 6 miles (9.7 km) south of Whitby on the North Yorkshire coast of England. Baytown rests on mud banks that cover layers of limestone and blue shale. At low tide long rocky scaurs can be seen and there is an abundance of fossils to be found. Originating in the early 16th century, the village rapidly became one of the most important fishing centres on the Yorkshire coast, reaching its zenith in the mid-19th century, before its rapid decline following the introduction of steam power. The coming of the railway in 1885 and the consequent influx of tourists and visitors, compensated for the decline of the local fishing industry. The village is a mixture of four storey town houses and split-level cottages, on a very steep three-in-one hill leading down to an area known as the Dock and the Wayfoot on the edge of the sea.

== History ==
In 1907 Walter Garstang was appointed professor of zoology at the University of Leeds. Recognised as one of the country's leading marine scientists, Garstang had been assistant director of the Plymouth Laboratory of the Marine Biological Association of the United Kingdom, and in charge of the association's Lowestoft Laboratory while directing Great Britain's part in the International Fishery Investigations of the North Sea.

Walter Garstang first visited Robin Hood's Bay at Easter in 1909, with T H. Taylor, his assistant lecturer and demonstrator in zoology, and Ll. Lloyd, his first advanced student (and later to be his reader in entomology and protozoology). Ll. Lloyd, who had known the area since boyhood, later recalled that they stayed at the Bay Hotel "and its veranda, the sea washing its wall at high tide, was our Laboratory" where they sorted and examined the great variety of animals collected from the shore and rock pools. In 1912, in cooperation with Alfred Denny, professor of zoology at Sheffield University, Walter Garstang established a marine research facility in Baytown, in an old building at the Wayfoot previously used as the coastguard cottage, and owned by Mrs. Martha Storm, a member of the long-established local fishing family. Jointly funded by Leeds and Sheffield Universities, the facility was known as Yorkshire Universities Marine Laboratory, and was used as a summer base for fieldwork, teaching and research by the Departments of Zoology and Botany. Initially for a two-year trial period, the two universities agreed to the annual outlay of £4 each for rent and up to £10 each for upkeep.

The minutes of the Faculty of Pure Science of the University of Sheffield on 12 March 1912 record the following resolution that was carried unanimously: That the Faculty approves of the proposal to extend the work of the Department of Zoology by co-operating with the University of Leeds in establishing a small marine Zoological Laboratory at Robin Hood's Bay.

The Report of the Faculty of Pure Science, for 1912–1913 stated that:

The Faculty notes with satisfaction that the Marine Zoological Station at Robin Hood's Bay continues to be a source of strength to the Department of Zoology. Advanced students and members of the staff of the University have worked there during the past session for periods amounting in all to about four months, and the work done has included investigations incorporated in a thesis for the M.Sc. Degree, and the collection of marine animals for the Zoological Museum.

In 1914 they agreed to continue the arrangement and to rent for a further £3 annually the adjoining large room, previously occupied by an auctioneer, and formerly being the coastguards' rocket apparatus room. In agreeing to the expansion, the Leeds University Finance Committee suggested that any funds required for additional equipment should be raised by private subscription. Walter Garstang was confident that he could acquire the necessary funds. Martha Storm had been willing to sell the premises in 1914, but it was not until 1922 that the buildings were jointly purchased by Leeds and Sheffield for the sum of £220. There were very few permanent facilities at the laboratory, so when the classes travelled over from Leeds and Sheffield they had to bring all the equipment they needed with them and carry it down from the top of Bay Bank.

In 1912 the young Lionel (Leo) Walmsley, son of the local artist J. Ulric Walmsley, and later to become a well-known novelist, secured the post of curator-caretaker of the lab at five shillings a week. There were no specified hours attached to the post and this allowed him to continue working as an uncertified assistant teacher at the local school.

== Literary references ==
In his autobiography So many loves (1944) dedicated "To Sam", Leo Walmsley describes the laboratory, shore collecting and life with the students and researchers. In the autumn of 1912 S.E. Wilson B.Sc. arrived at the laboratory. A University of Sheffield post-graduate researcher who had recently been appointed Assistant Curator of the Zoological Museum, Sam Wilson was studying a parasitic crustacean (listed by Walmsley as "Spanknotrophus") and its nudibranch host Doto coronata. He became Walmsley's mentor and lifelong friend, encouraging him to study and to write.

In Walmsley's words:

They had bought the old Coastguard Station, which forms one of the village ramparts against the sea by the Slipway. They were equipping it with benches and tanks for keeping live marine animals, and wanted someone to act as a sort of curator-caretaker, preferably someone who knew the beaches and would be able to assist in the collection of specimens. I got the job. They could only pay five shillings a week, but ... there were no specified hours... the Leeds professor Walter Garstang ... certainly looked like a real scientist. He was untidy and always wore rough tweeds and heavy boots. He didn't mind wading into pools.

And:

When the weather was bad and the sea rough, it was like being in a lighthouse. The big waves thundered on the outer wall making the whole building tremble, and we'd see the spray swishing up over the windows and hear it splashing on the roof, and rushing down again. At high tide in such weather it wasn't safe to leave the laboratory to go into the cottage, for everything would be awash outside, and even the fishing cobles had to be hauled from the Dock far up the main street, and the cottages here had to have their ground-floor windows barred to stop flooding.

Alfred Denny retired in 1925 and Sheffield's interest in the laboratory lapsed. The University of Sheffield withdrew their support in 1928, the minutes of the 25 May 1928 meeting of the Faculty of Pure Science recording:

That the University withdraw from the arrangement to co-operate with the University of Leeds in the maintenance of the Marine Zoological Laboratory at Robin Hood's Bay, which was entered into in pursuance of the resolution adopted by the Faculty on March 5th 1912 (Vol. II, p.8) but had proved to be of no benefit to the Zoological Department and was a drain on its funds.

However, generations of Leeds students and researchers, and visiting marine scientists, benefited from working in Robin Hood's Bay. Walter Garstang retired in 1933, but the laboratory continued to operate along the lines established. In Garstang's obituary notice in 1949 in Nature, Professor L. Eastham, a former pupil, wrote:

Few who go from us will leave behind so much affection and such a sense of gratitude. It is inevitable that his students will remember Garstang for his perpetual youth and his genial kindness. They will think of their visits with him to the marine station which he established at Robin Hood's Bay; of teas in the laboratory at which he and Mrs Garstang were generous hosts and at which the week's problems were discussed; and of their open house at Meanwood where all students were welcome.

He was succeeded by E.A. Spaul, who was professor of zoology from 1933 to 1960, though during this period marine research was not a Leeds priority. The building was gradually improved with much "do it yourself" work; more benches were added, together with electric points, and better domestic facilities in the living area. At the start of World War II the building was taken over by the army and the seaward end of the building, suitably armed, formed part of the country's anti-invasion defences for the next five years.

== 1950s ==
By 1955 the living accommodation had been largely taken over for laboratory space and it was possible to squeeze up to 40 or 50 students into the various rooms. The laboratory continued to serve mainly as a base for undergraduate field courses, and local cottages were rented and shared by students (segregated into same-sex groups). The laboratory was also rented out to parties from other educational institutions and was in constant use for much of each summer.

The 1960s saw the beginning of a period of expansion in marine scientific and environmental research, and J. M. Dodd, Eric Spaul's successor at Leeds, obtained financial support from the Wellcome Trust. Dodd was formerly director of the Gatty Marine Laboratory of the University of St. Andrews and his interests in elasmobranch endocrinology formed a basis for his approach to the Wellcome Trust. The original plan was that the existing buildings would be modernised, but on examination by the builders it was declared that the old buildings would not stand up to the work, and so they were razed to the ground.

Fiercely opposed by local residents, including, ironically, Leo Walmsley the now successful novelist, the university won in the name of science. The Wellcome Marine Laboratory was built on the site and although the architects claimed (as architects do) that their design would blend in with nearby buildings, the outcome was an architectural mistake. The new laboratory was formally opened in April 1967 by Sir John Orr, of the Wellcome Trust at a ceremony attended by a number of local dignitaries and the vice-chancellor of Leeds University. Dr J. R. (Jack) Lewis took up post as senior lecturer-in-charge. The building subsequently received an award for its design from the Royal Institute of British Architects (RIBA).

The facilities at the new laboratory were far superior to its predecessor and it had an underfloor reservoir of seawater that was pumped to all parts of the building. It was soon found, however, that the laboratory could not provide sufficient accommodation for the increasing numbers of staff, students and visiting scientists. Fortunately a local bequest made it possible to buy and convert the Old School House at the top of Fisherhead into a hostel for visiting scientists. The hostel also housed the laboratory's library for some time, and was renamed Wright House, after its benefactor.

The laboratory subscribed to a number of specialised journals not taken by the main university library, and older books from that library were transferred to the library in Baytown. As there were only about twelve staff at any one time, the library was run on trust and staff signed out any items borrowed. Later Leeds University purchased a house adjacent to the Laboratory and the library was moved to this new location.

Despite the controversy over the design of the building, the staff at the laboratory enjoyed friendly relations with the residents of Baytown. Some staff purchased property in the village and their wives taught in the local Fylingdales School. A local fisherman was recruited to look after the laboratory's boat that was based in Whitby. The boat was a modern version of a coble. When not required for sea excursions, the fisherman was usefully employed as an odd job man around the laboratory. A local lady was employed as a caretaker for the hostel, and another as a cleaner at the laboratory. The only conflict came about with a neighbour living behind the laboratory who ran a guest house, and who periodically complained about the noise. This problem was resolved when the lady moved to another property in the village.

== Construction ==
There were some problems experienced with the building itself over the years. The sandstone from which it was built was not sufficiently durable to withstand the local elements. At high tide the whole building vibrated and the sea came right up the slipway so that the front door could not be used. One remedial measure taken was to coat the sandstone in silicone. In 1971, during a very severe winter, high and rough seas scoured away the slipway and the foundations of the marine laboratory. In between tides emergency repairs were attempted by filling up the hole with sandbags and rocks, which the following tide demolished with contempt. It was only when the weather improved that diggers and earth movers could be used to build up a permanent base and allow the relaying of the cobbles.

Originally it had been anticipated that staff and research students based in Leeds would make regular use of the facilities, but partly because of the laboratory's ability to supply live animals to seawater tanks in Leeds, use declined. In effect what had been regarded as an extension of the Zoology Department on the coast acquired its own identity with distinctive research interests. In 1972 the laboratory became a separate unit of the Faculty of Science, independent of the Zoology Department, with Jack Lewis as director. At that time it had a permanent staff of two zoologists, three research assistants and two technicians, with a small library, and a boatman with a 32-foot (9.8 m) coble, Njord. Living and preserved specimens were supplied, and additional laboratory space and facilities were available for students, with living accommodation for up to four visiting workers. The creation by the university of the post-doctoral Garstang Research Fellowship added to the resident scientific staff. In 1973 the possibilities were examined of developing the nearby site formerly occupied by the gasworks, notable as being the smallest gasworks in Yorkshire, but no further action was taken.

The director, with a succession of gifted research students, research assistants, and visiting workers, made intensive and continuous studies of rocky shore and marine benthic ecology, including some baseline environmental and pollution studies under contract. Work by the lecturer and later deputy director, John Gray who was at the laboratory from 1965 to 1976 and was to become a major figure in international marine scientific research, is an example. From 1978 a much-expanded programme of research was funded by the Natural Environment Research Council. The work was concerned with the natural recruitment variability of selected common species around the British Isles, and it led in 1979 to a major European project (COST 47) as part of the EEC Environment Programme.

Despite the high reputation of the Robin Hood's Bay Laboratory in terms of the quality and quantity of its research output and teaching programme, Leeds University reluctantly terminated its existence in December 1982 as part of the policy of general cutbacks forced upon British science by the government. Jack Lewis took early retirement after arranging for most of the research team to move up the coast to Cullercoats, to continue their work in Newcastle University's Dove Marine Laboratory.

== Current structure ==
For a while the building remained empty, and then it was sold at a drastically reduced price. The university was pleased with the sale because the new owners proposed to use the building as a natural history educational establishment, and so it would remain in the education sector. It was described as a marine activity centre and was mainly used by parties of canoeists and scuba divers. In 1998 the building was bought by the National Trust and rebuilt in the style of the earlier coastguard station, becoming a visitor centre operated jointly by the National Trust and the North York Moors National Park Authority, and with holiday accommodation on the second floor.
