= Robin Hood's Bay =

Village in North Yorkshire, England

Coordinates: 54°26′01″N 0°32′04″W

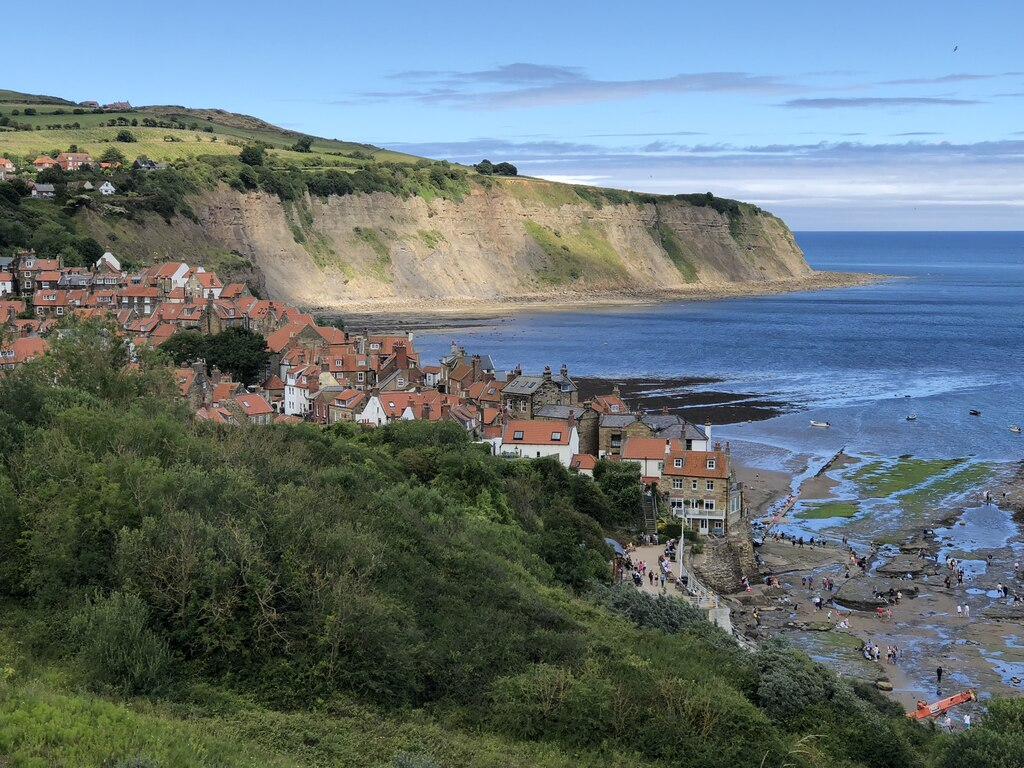
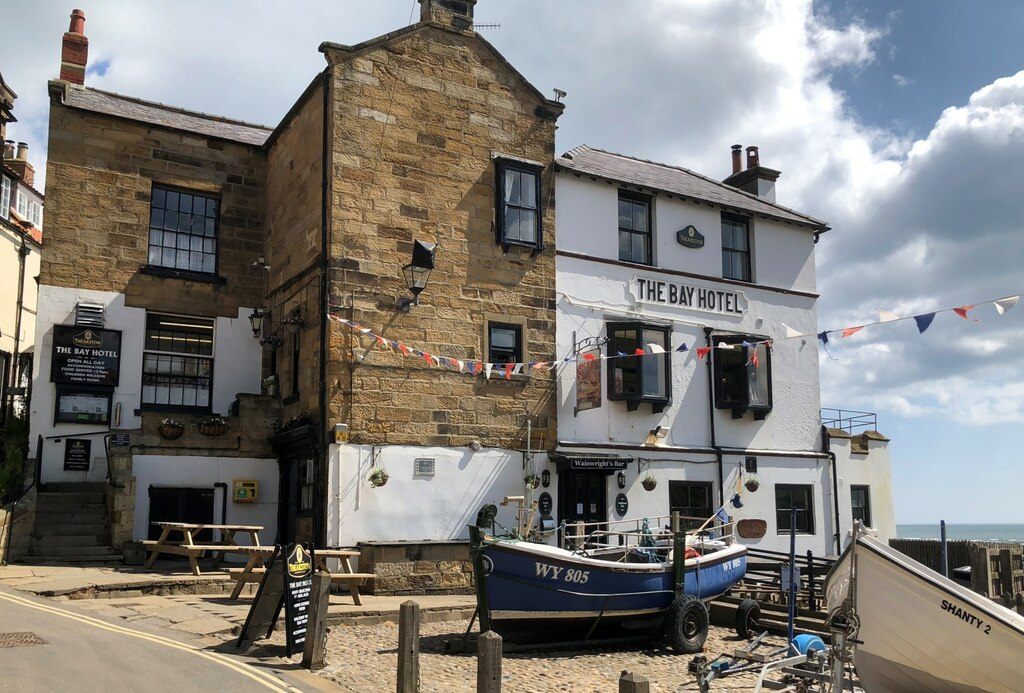
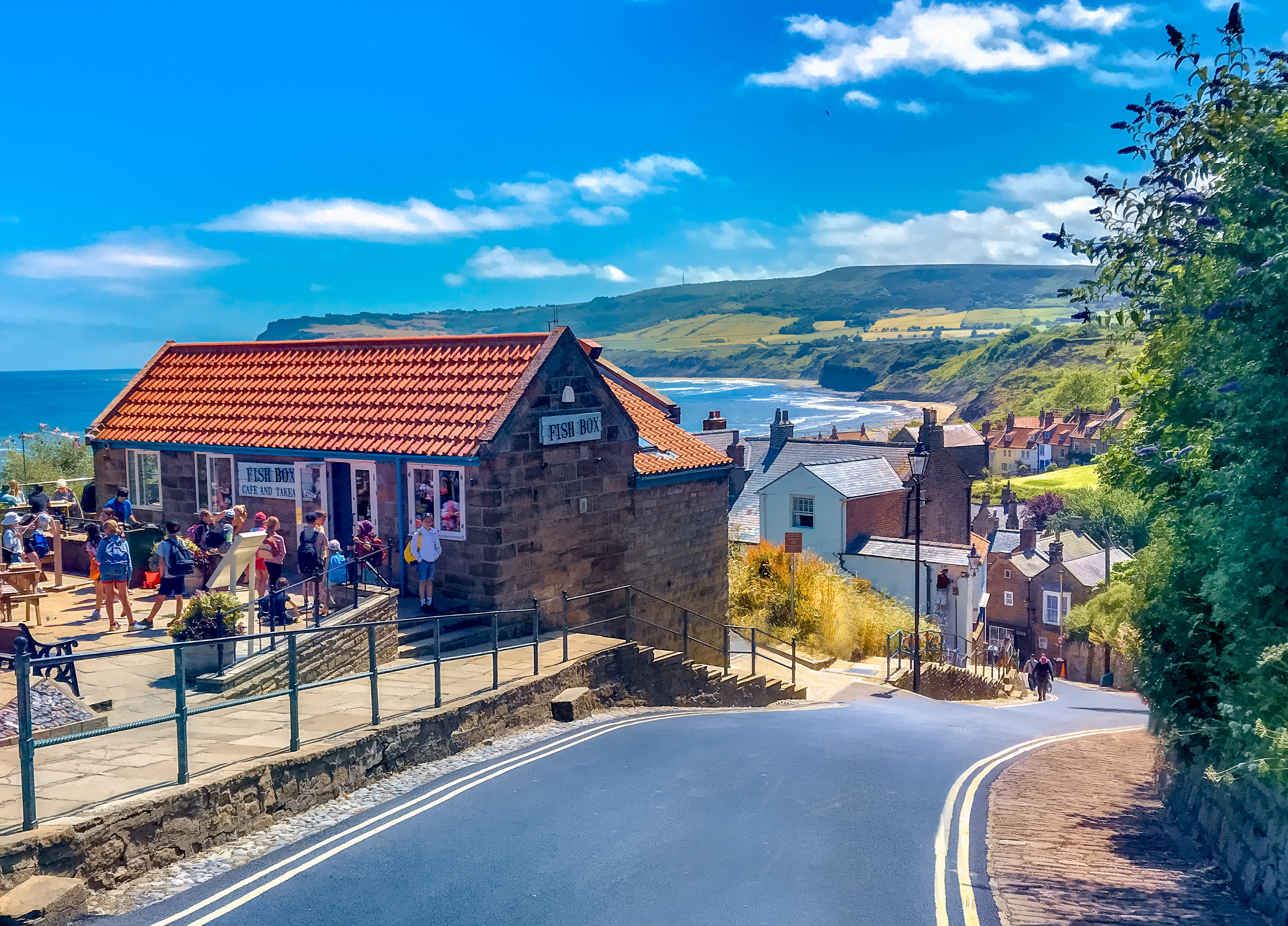
- The Dock Bay Road

- Location within North Yorkshire
- OS grid reference: NZ950053
- Civil parish: Fylingdales
- Unitary authority: North Yorkshire
- Ceremonial county: North Yorkshire
- Region: Yorkshire and the Humber
- Country: England
- Sovereign state: United Kingdom
- Post town: Whitby
- Postcode district: YO22
- Dialling code: 01947
- Police: North Yorkshire
- Fire: North Yorkshire
- Ambulance: Yorkshire
- UK Parliament: Scarborough and Whitby

Robin Hood's Bay is a village in North Yorkshire, England. It is 6 miles (10 km) south of Whitby and 15 miles (24 km) north of Scarborough on the Yorkshire Coast. Robin Hood's Bay is a tourist destination in the North York Moors National Park.

It is an ancient chapelry of Fylingdales in the wapentake of Whitby Strand. It is on the Cleveland Way national trail and also the end point of Wainwright's Coast to Coast route.

== History ==
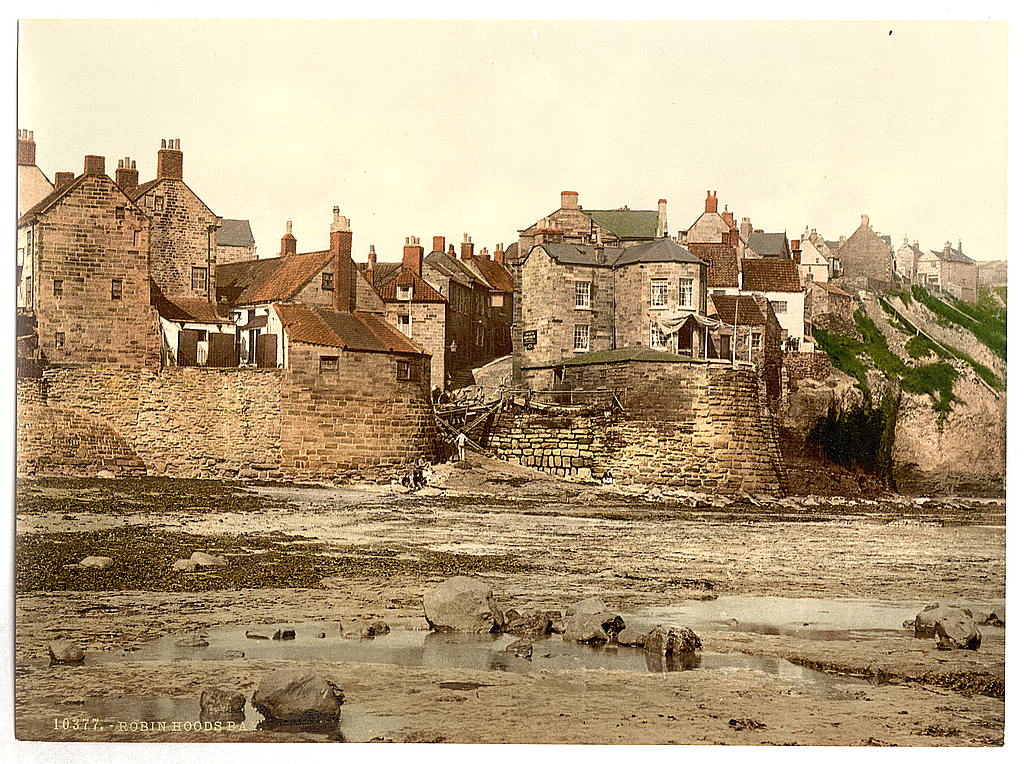
"Whitby, Robin Hood's Bay, Yorkshire, England", c. 1890–1900

=== Toponymy ===
The origin of the name is uncertain, and it is doubtful that Robin Hood was ever in the vicinity of the village (if indeed he ever existed). The place is attested in the early sixteenth century as "Robyn Hoodis Baye" in 1544. The English ballad The Noble Fisherman tells a story of Robin Hood visiting Scarborough, taking a job as a fisherman, defeating French pirates with his archery skills, and using half the looted treasure to build a home for the poor. However, the ballad is only attested to in the 17th century at the earliest. It is considered more likely to be a work original to the 17th century rather than an older medieval popular legend passed down, and very unlikely to be based on any historical incident. However, it is possible the author knew of Robin Hood's Bay, and sought to tie the story he wrote to the Scarborough area to explain and justify the name.

=== Early history ===
By about 1000 the neighbouring hamlet of Raw and the village of Thorpe (Fylingthorpe) in Fylingdales had been settled by Norwegians and Danes. After the Norman conquest in 1069 much land in Northern England, including Fylingdales, was laid waste. William the Conqueror gave Fylingdales to Tancred the Fleming, who later sold it to the Abbot of Whitby.

In the period 1324–1346 there was an early reference to Robin Hood's Bay. Louis I, Count of Flanders, wrote a letter to King Edward III in which he complained that Flemish fishermen together with their boats and catches were taken by force to Robyn Oeds Bay. The settlements were about a mile inland at Raw but by about 1500 a settlement had grown up on the coast. "Robin Hoode Baye" was mentioned by Leland in 1536 who described it as,

"A fischer tounlet of 20 bootes with Dok or Bosom of a mile yn length."

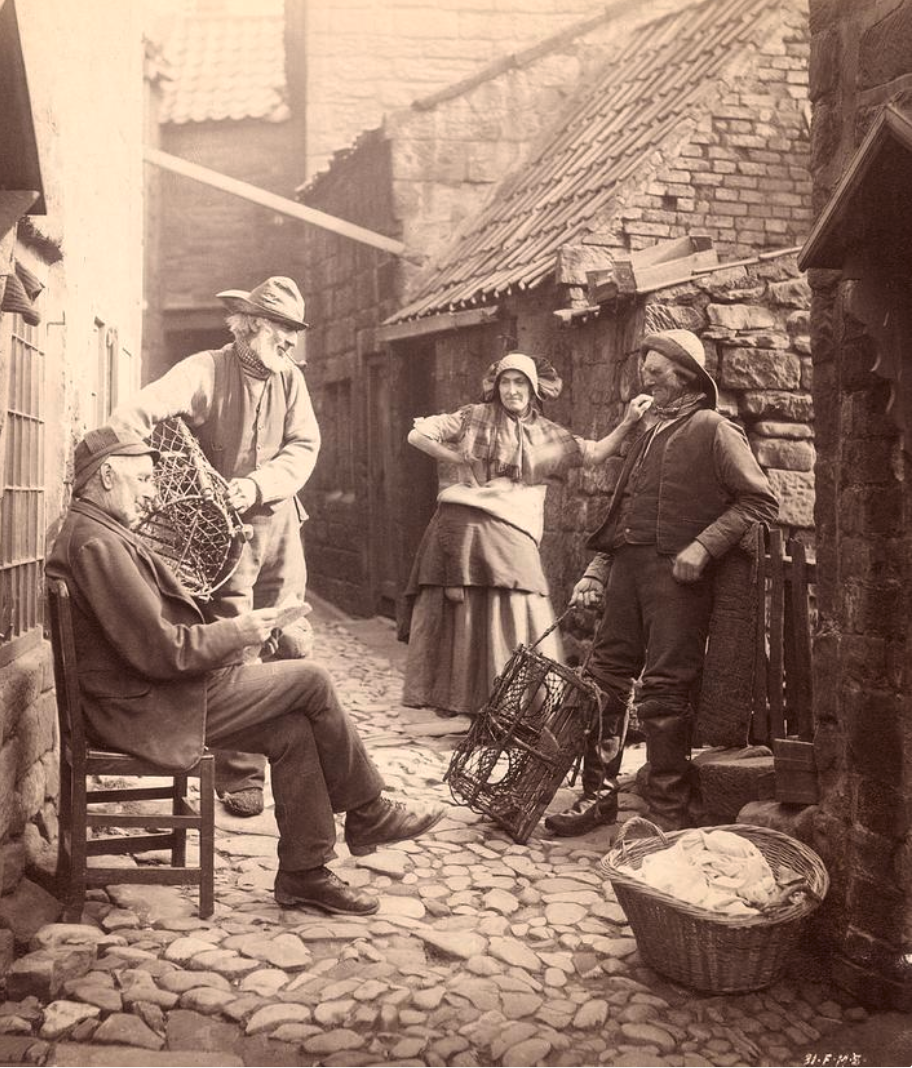
Fisher folk, Robin Hood's Bay, 1880, by Frank Sutcliffe

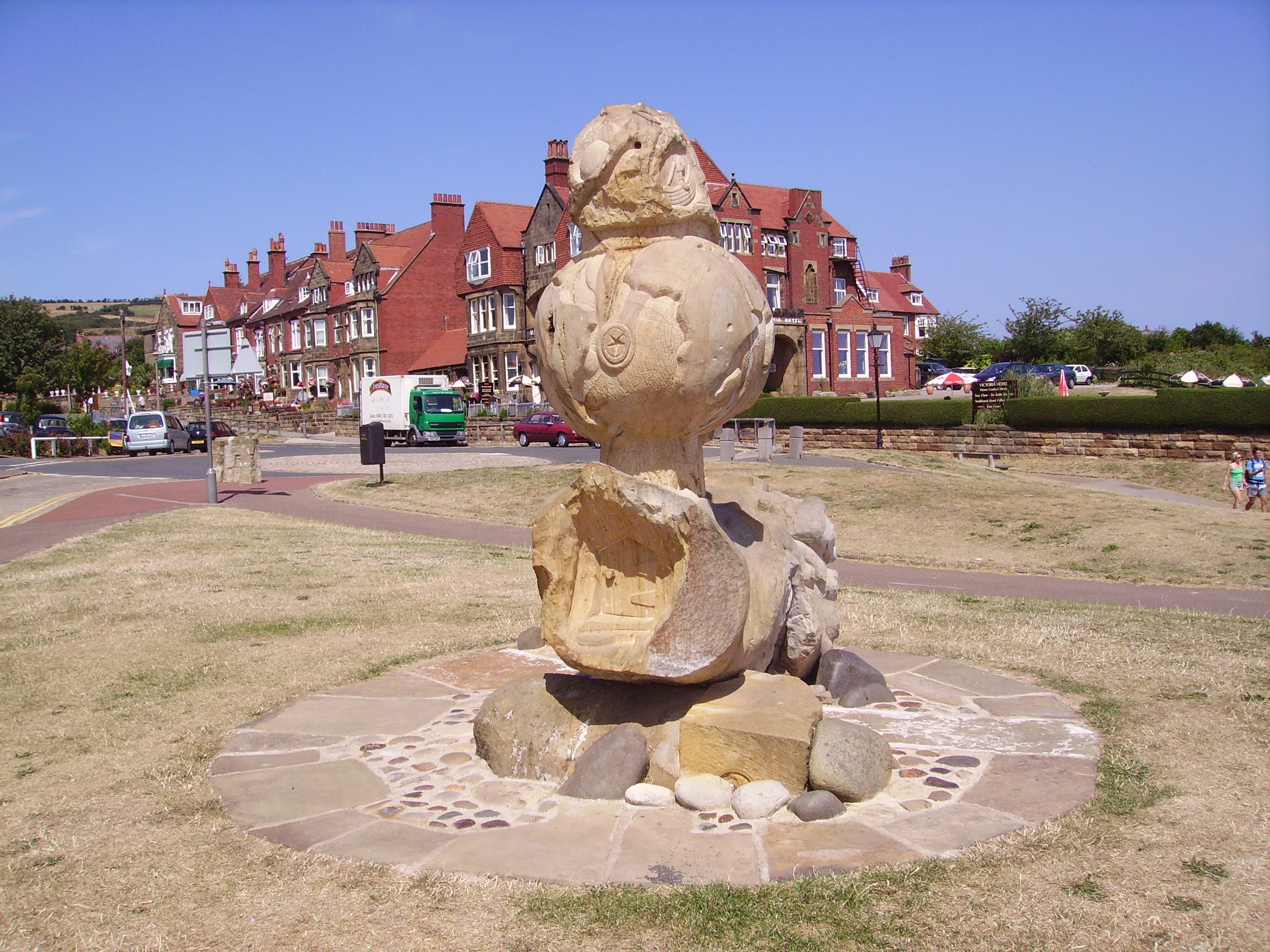
Robin Hood's Bay Sculpture

After the Dissolution of the Monasteries in 1540, Whitby Abbey and its lands became the property of King Henry VIII with King Street and King's Beck dating from this time.

In the 16th century, Robin Hood's Bay was a more important port than Whitby, it is described by a tiny picture of tall houses and an anchor on old North Sea charts published by Waghenaer in 1586 and now in Rotterdam's Maritime Museum.

=== Smuggling ===
The village, which consists of a maze of tiny streets, has a tradition of smuggling, and there is reputed to be a network of subterranean passageways linking the houses. During the late 18th century smuggling was rife on the Yorkshire coast. Vessels from the continent brought contraband which was distributed by contacts on land and the operations were financed by syndicates who made profits without the risks taken by the seamen and the villagers. Tea, gin, rum, brandy and tobacco were among the contraband smuggled into Yorkshire from the Netherlands and France to avoid the duty.

In 1773 two excise cutters, the Mermaid and the Eagle, were outgunned and chased out of the bay by three smuggling vessels, a schooner and two shallops. A pitched battle between smugglers and excise men took place in the dock over 200 casks of brandy and geneva (gin) and 15 bags of tea in 1779.

=== Fishing, farming and lifeboats ===
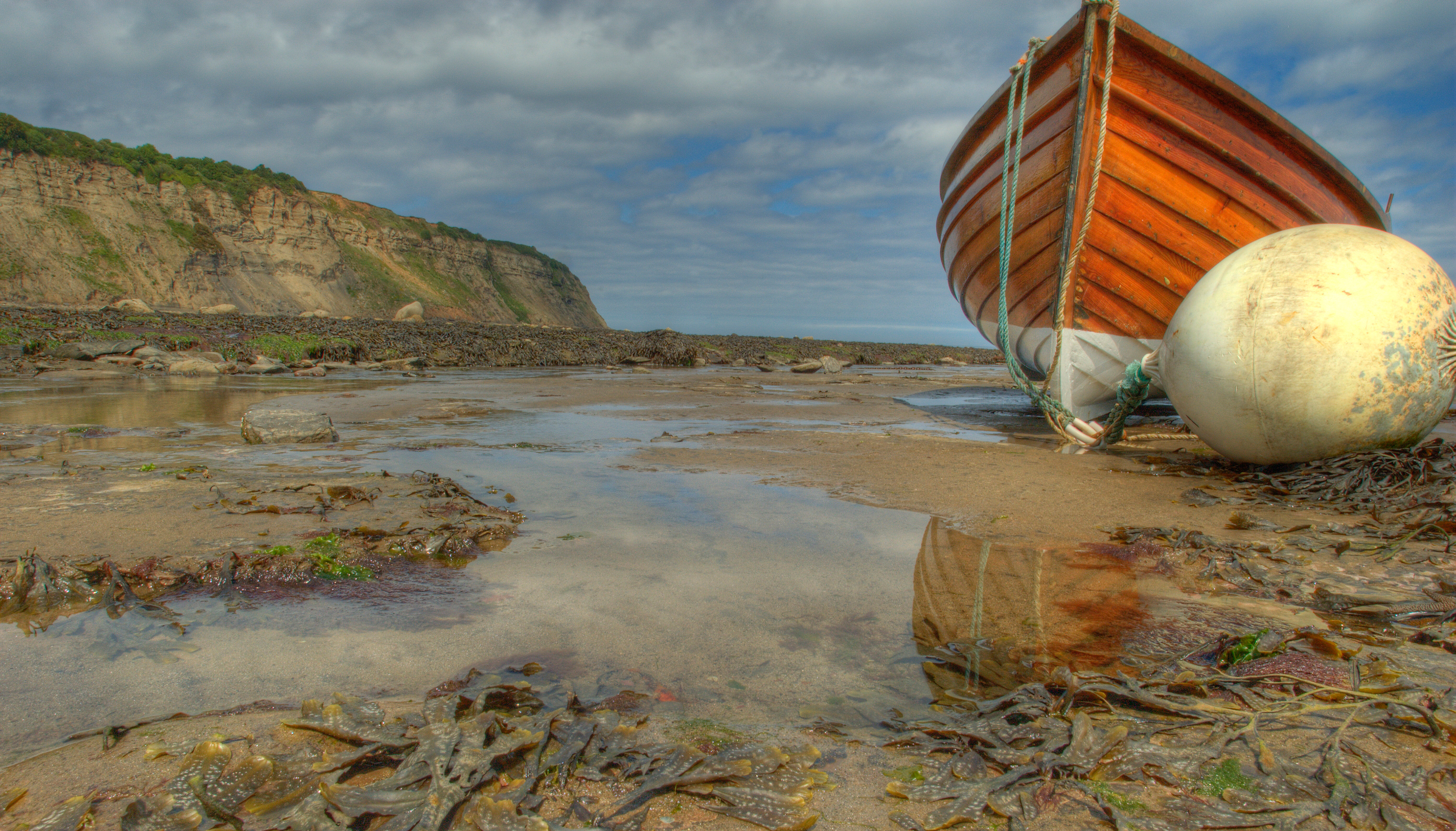
A boat in Robin Hood's Bay

Fishing and farming were the original occupations followed by generations of Bay folk. Many houses in the village were built between 1650 and 1750 and whole families were involved in the fishing industry. Many families owned or part-owned cobles. Later some owned ocean-going craft. Fishing reached its peak in the mid 19th century, fishermen used the coble for line fishing in winter and a larger boat for herring fishing. Fish was loaded into panniers and men and women walked or rode over the moorland tracks to Pickering or York.

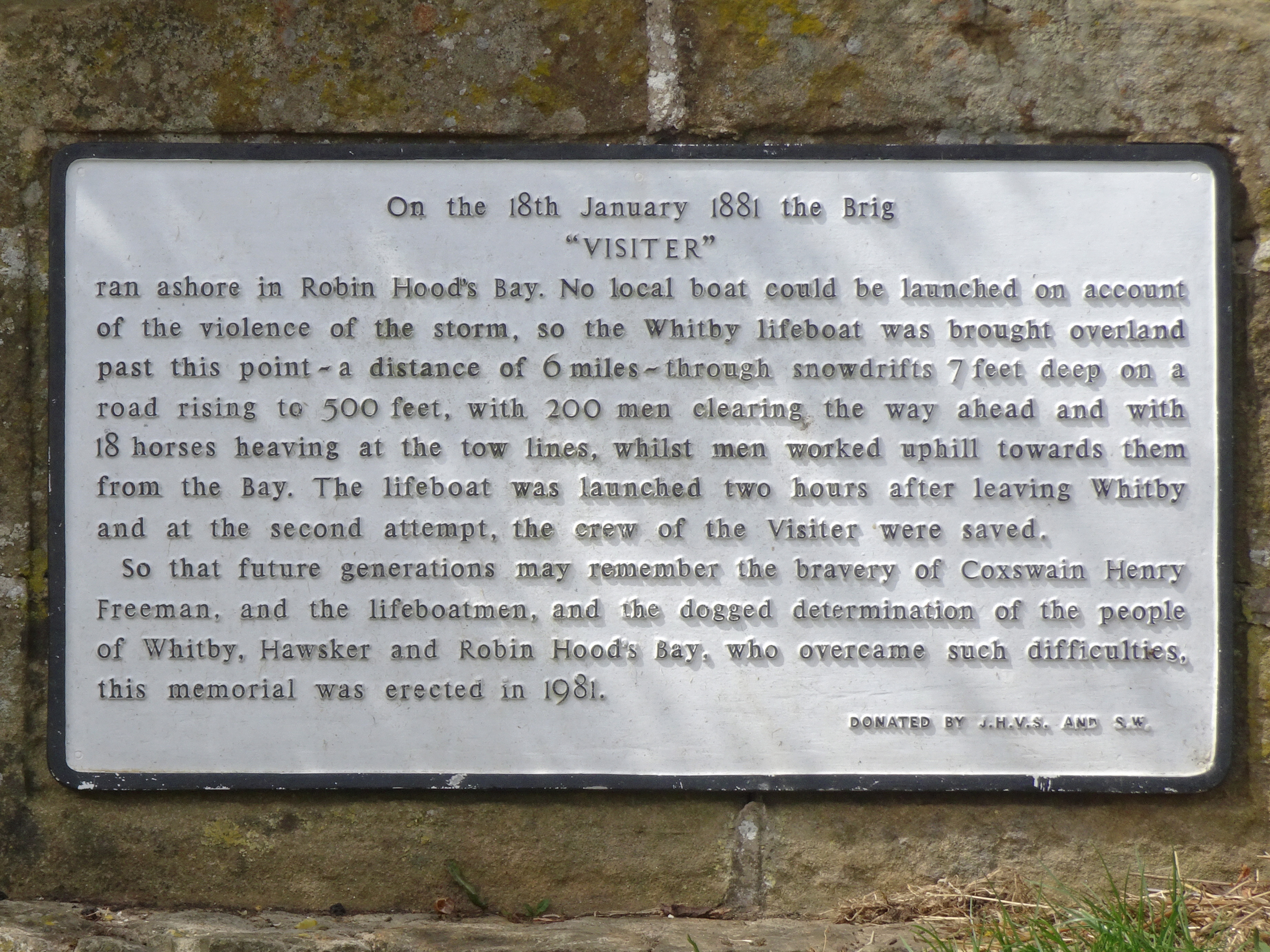
The "Visiter" wreck plaque

A plaque in the village records that a brig named "Visiter" ran aground in Robin Hood's Bay on 18 January 1881 during a violent storm. In order to save the crew, the lifeboat from Whitby was pulled 6 miles (9.7 km) overland by 18 horses, with the 7-foot (2.1 m) deep snowdrifts present at the time cleared by 200 men. The road down to the sea through Robin Hood's Bay village was narrow and had awkward bends, and men had to go ahead demolishing garden walls and uprooting bushes to make a way for the lifeboat carriage. It was launched two hours after leaving Whitby, with the crew of the "Visiter" rescued on the second attempt.

The main legitimate activity had always been fishing, but this started to decline in the late 19th century. These days most of its income comes from tourism.

Robin Hood's Bay is also known for the large number of fossils which may be found on its beach. The foreshore rocks on the north side of the bay, in particular, are a well known location for finding ammonites, especially after winter storms.

In 1912, Professor Walter Garstang of Leeds University, in cooperation with Professor Alfred Denny of the University of Sheffield, established the Robin Hood's Bay Marine Laboratory, which continued on the site for the next 71 years, closing in 1983.

== Governance ==
Robin Hood's Bay was part of the chapelry of Fylingdales in the Liberty of Whitby Strand, which was a wapentake in the North Riding of Yorkshire. From 1974 to 2023 it was part of the Borough of Scarborough. It is now administered by the unitary North Yorkshire Council.

== Geography ==
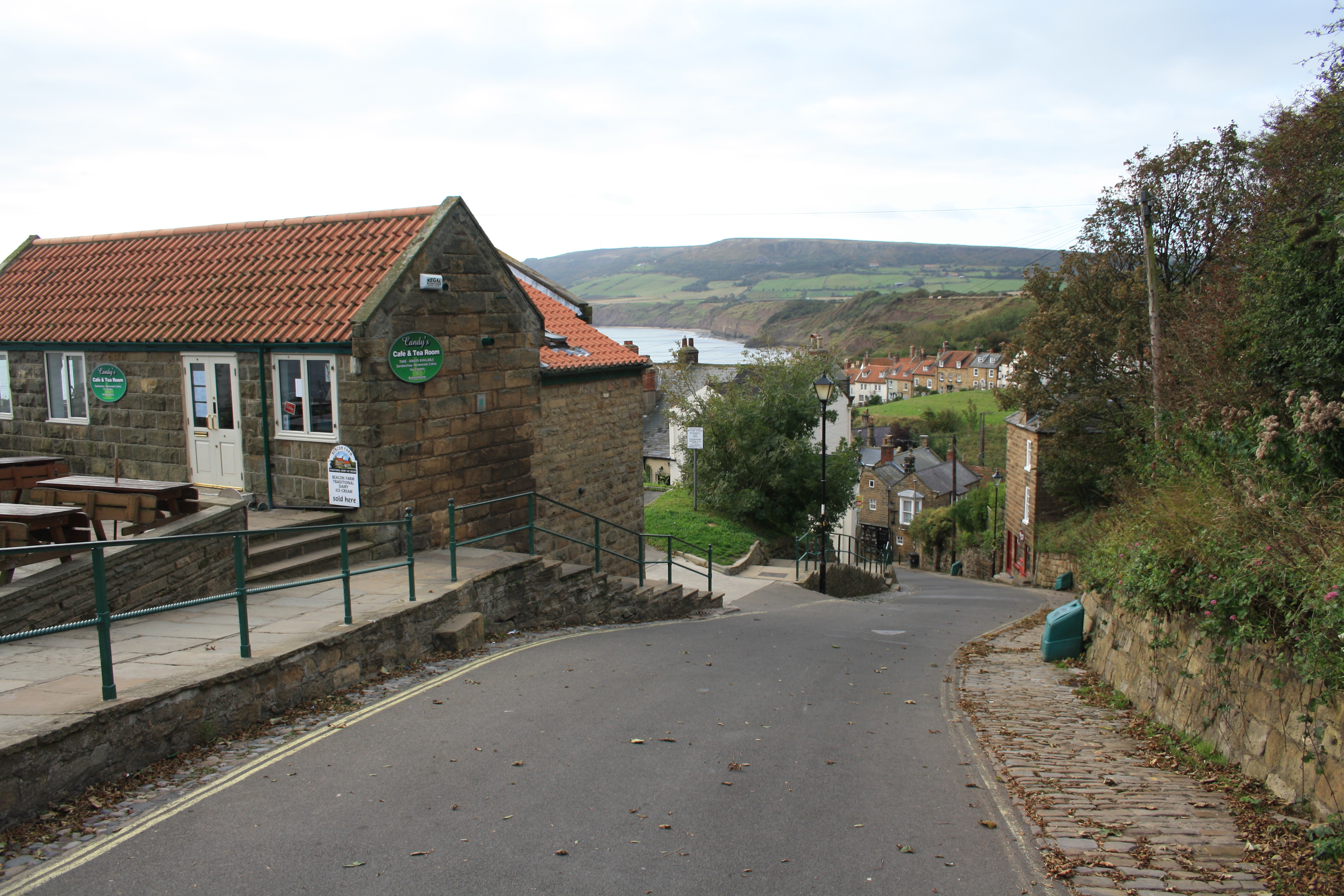
New Road, leading down to the sea shore

Robin Hood's Bay is built in a fissure between two steep cliffs. The village houses were built mostly of sandstone with red-tiled roofs. The main street is New Road, which descends from the cliff-top where the manor house, the newer houses and St Stephen's Church, Fylingdales stand. It passes through the village crossing the King's Beck and reaches the beach by a cobbled slipway known as Wayfoot where the beck discharges onto the beach.

The cliffs are composed of Upper Lias shale, capped by Dogger and False Bedded Sandstones and shales of the Lower Oolite.

The Wine Haven Profile near Robin Hood's Bay is the Global Stratotype Section and Point (GSSP) of the Pliensbachian Epoch (183,0–189,6 mya), one of four chronographic substages of the Early Jurassic Epoch.

The headlands at each end of the beach are known as Ness Point or North Cheek (north) and Old Peak or South Cheek (south).

== Transport ==
The village was once served by Robin Hood's Bay railway station on the Scarborough and Whitby Railway line which opened in 1885 and closed in 1965. The track of the old railway is now a footpath and cycleway. The nearest railway station is in Whitby.

The village connects to the A171 allowing access to Whitby and Scarborough. The X93 Arriva bus service between Scarborough and Middlesbrough passes through Robin Hood's Bay every hour, increasing to every 30 minutes or every 20 minutes during the summer.

Robin Hood's Bay is the eastern terminus of Wainwright's Coast to Coast Walk that crosses from St Bees Head on the Irish Sea coast of Cumbria. The village is also on the coastal section of the Cleveland Way, a long-distance footpath that encircles the North York Moors, and the Cinder Track, a multi-user path that forms part of National Cycle Route 1 and links Whitby and Scarborough.

== Religion ==
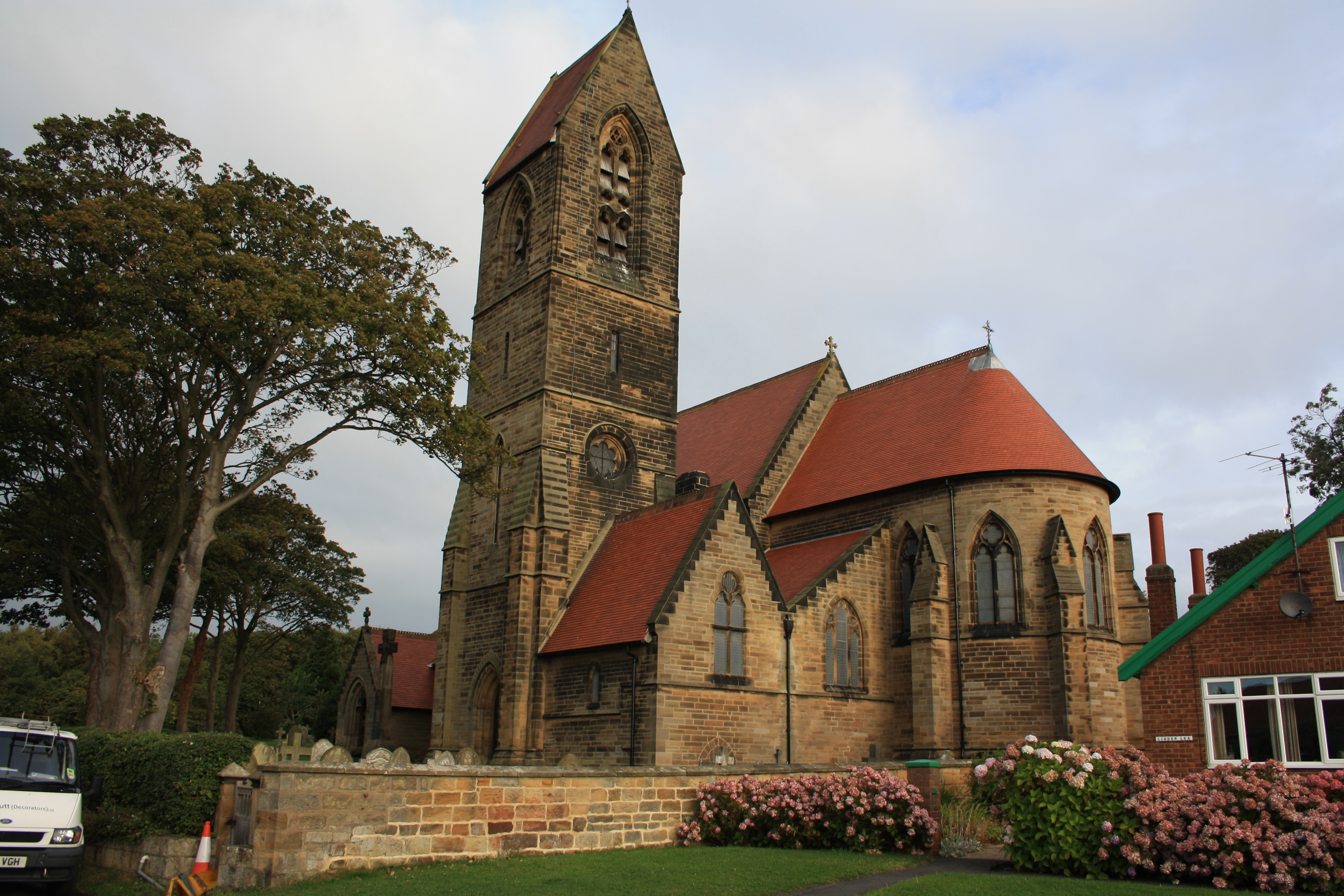
The new St Stephen's Church on Thorpe Lane

Robin Hood's Bay is in the parish of Fylingdales, which contains two churches both dedicated to St Stephen. The Old St Stephen's Church, Fylingdales, on the hillside at Raw, above the village, replaced an ancient church which had Saxon origins and was demolished in about 1821. This was a dependent chapel of Whitby Abbey. A new church, also St Stephen's, designed by George Edmund Street, was built in 1870.

The village was visited by the preacher John Wesley in 1761, and has a Methodist church.

== Culture ==
The Bay Hotel

Robin Hood's Bay is the setting for the Bramblewick novels (Three Fevers, Phantom Lobster, Foreigners, Sally Lunn, Master Mariner and Sound of the Sea) by Leo Walmsley (1892–1966), who was educated in the schoolroom of the old Wesleyan Chapel, in the lower village. The 1935 film Turn of the Tide, based on Walmsley's Three Fevers, was filmed in the village.

In 1925, the Fylingdales Group of Artists was founded at Denton Hawley's studio in Robin Hood's Bay.

In 1948, LIFE magazine ran a story of an unknown Poison Penman who had been writing spiteful anonymous letters to the inhabitants of Robin Hood's Bay since 1928.

The 2008 film Wild Child contains several scenes filmed at Robin Hood's Bay. The 2017 film Phantom Thread starring Daniel Day-Lewis features a number of Robin Hood's Bay locations, including the classic interior of the Victoria Hotel and the clifftops above the village.

Missing in Time, a novel by Catherine Harriott, is set in Robin Hood's Bay and contains references and descriptions of local history, geography and culture. "Robin Hood's Bay" is a poem by children's poet Michael Rosen.

The Bayfair newspaper contains news and local information on the village. Wireless Internet access is provided for visitors all around the village by the Bay Broadband Co-operative.

== Media ==
Local news and television programmes are provided by BBC North East and Cumbria and ITV Tyne Tees. Television signals are received from the local relay transmitter which transmitted via the Bilsdale TV transmitter, the relay transmitter is situated near Ravenscar.

Local radio stations are BBC Radio Tees, BBC Radio York, Greatest Hits Radio Yorkshire Coast, Coast & County Radio and This is The Coast.

The village is served by these local newspapers:

- Whitby Gazette
- Evening Gazette
- BayTown Chronicle

== Notable people ==
- Eileen Colwell, librarian, born in Robin Hood's Bay
- Stanley Hollis VC spent part of his youth working in the town
- Steve Huison, actor (The Full Monty), has lived in Robin Hood's Bay
- Leo Walmsley (1892–1966), writer, lived in the village between 1894 and 1913
- Folk singer and guitarist Martin Carthy has lived for many years in the village, with his family, which has included wife Norma Waterson (1939–2022) and daughter Eliza Carthy.

== See also ==
- Listed buildings in Fylingdales

== Gallery ==
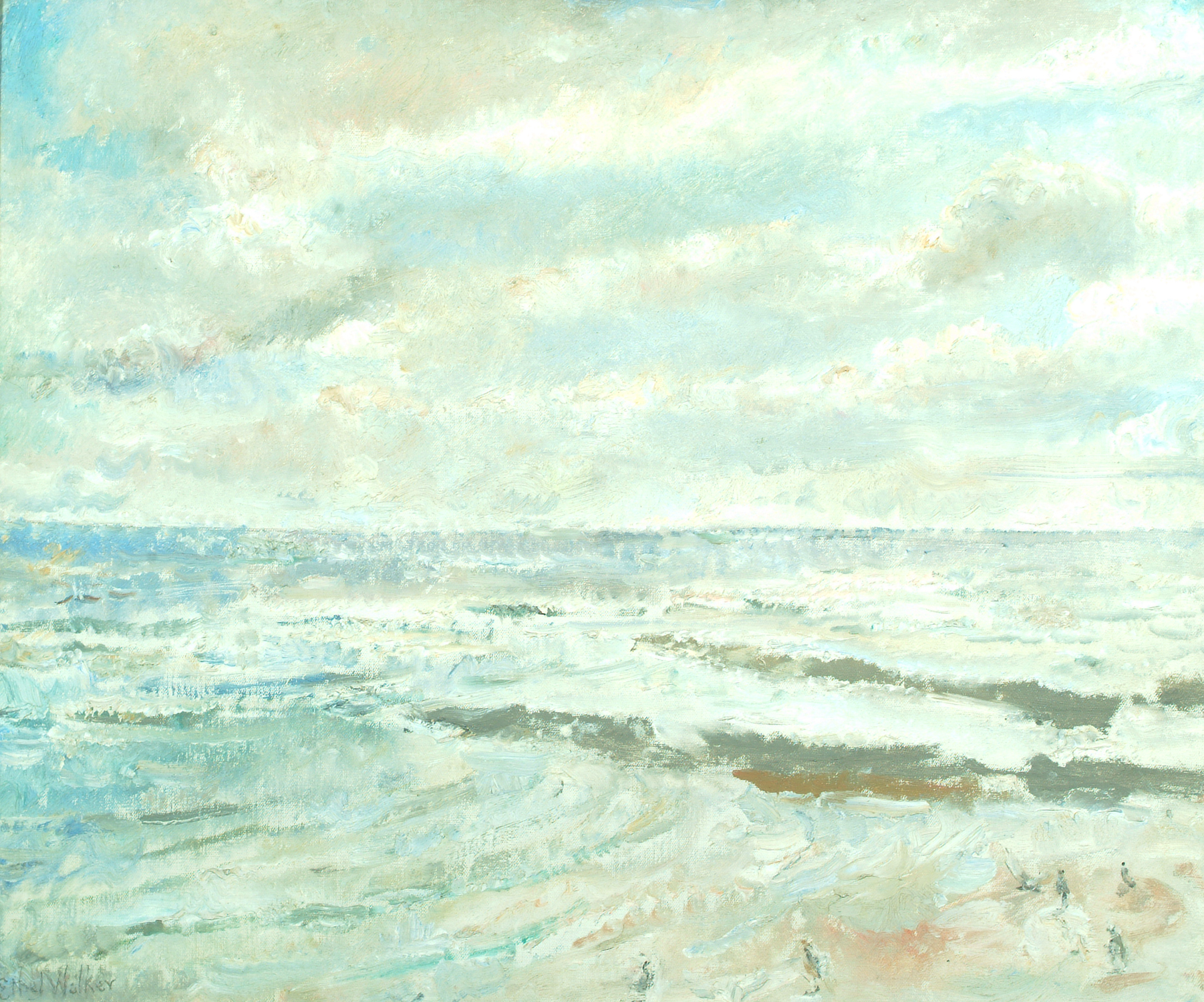
Robin Hood's Bay by Dame Ethel Walker, Aberdeen Art Gallery

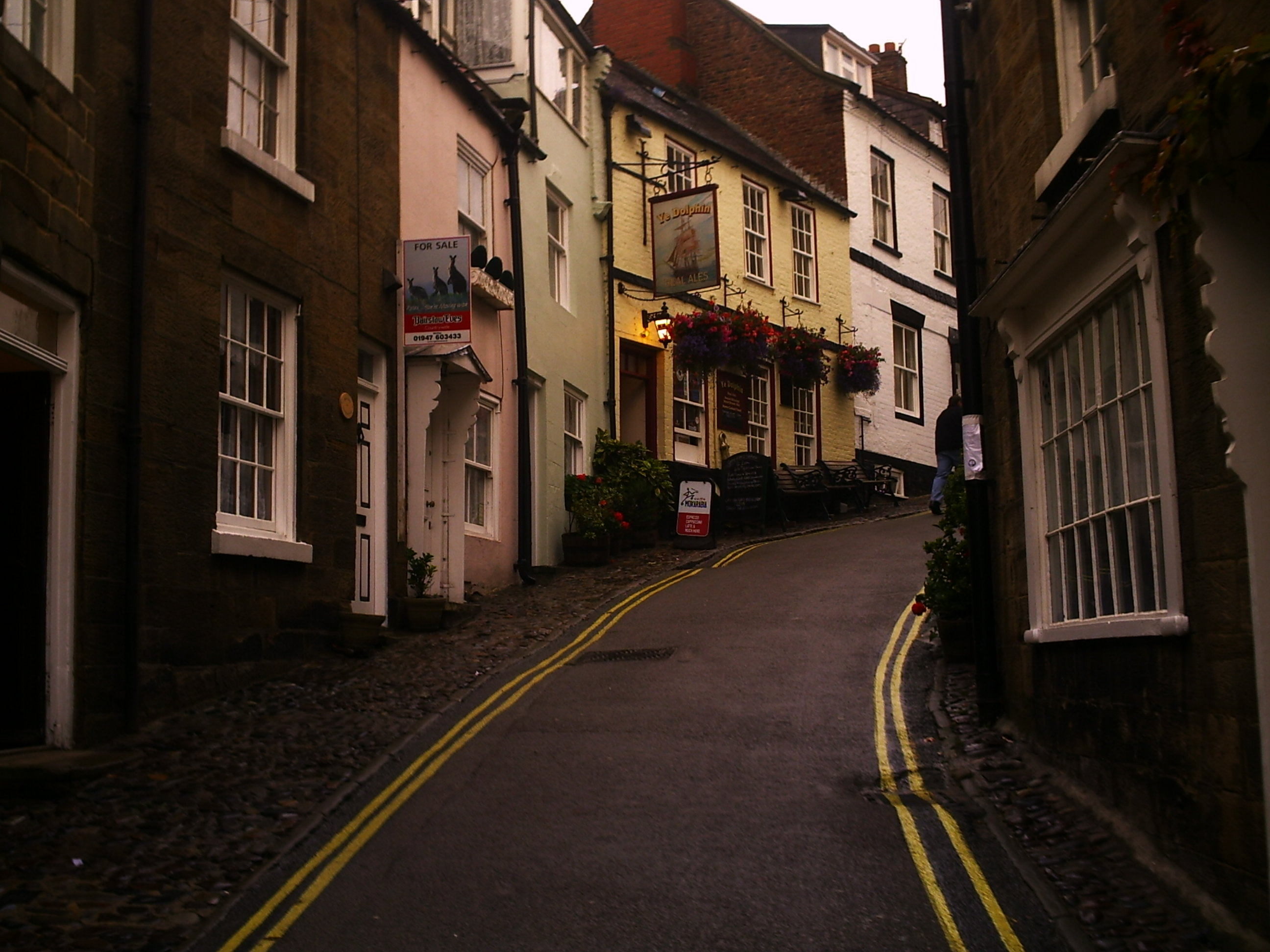
King Street in Robin Hood's Bay

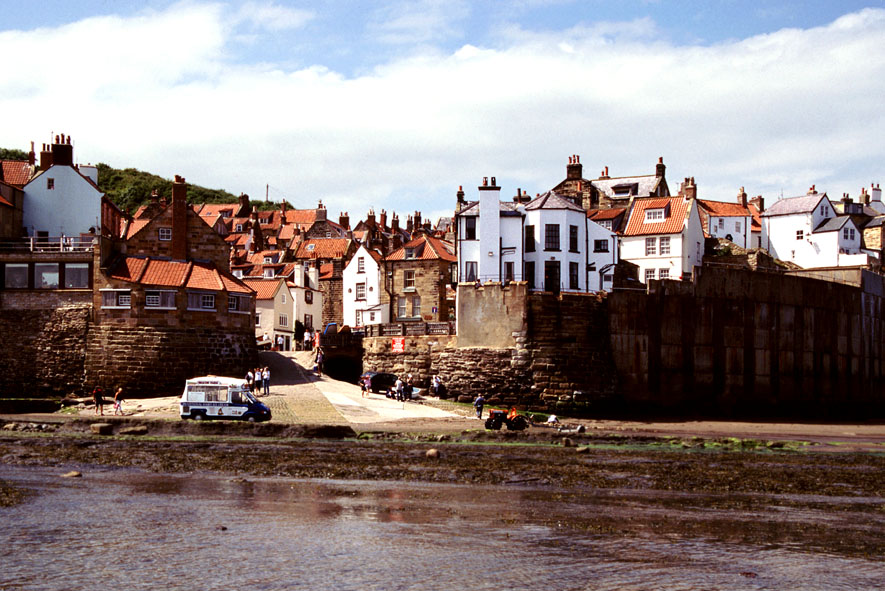
Robin Hood's Bay – view from the sea

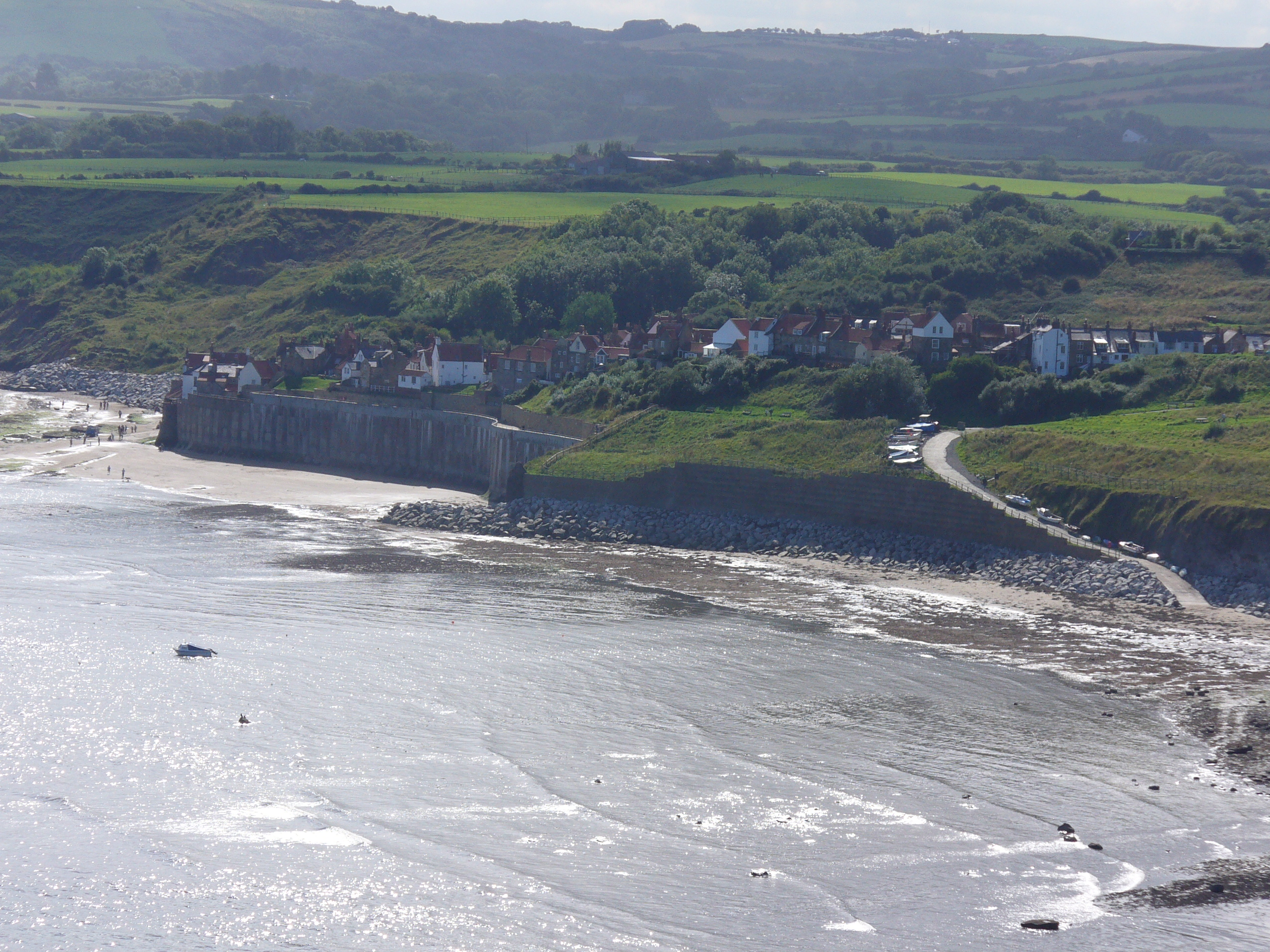
Robin Hood's Bay from the Cleveland Way

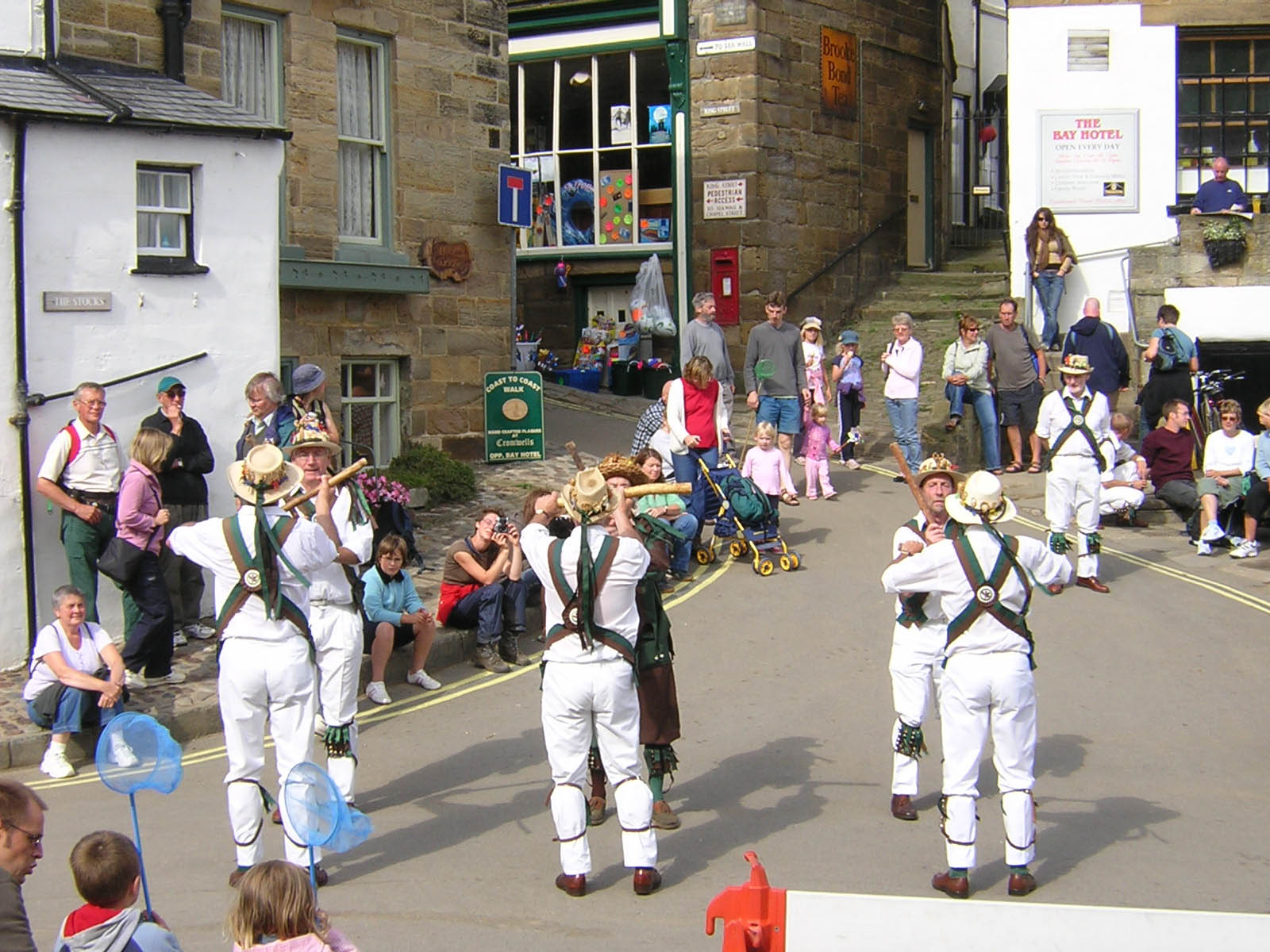
Morris Dancers in Robin Hood's Bay
