= Old Chapel =

Old Chapel may refer to:

== United Kingdom ==
- Fulwood Old Chapel, Sheffield, England
- The Old Chapel, Ripon, North Yorkshire, England
- The Old Chapel, Robin Hood's Bay, North Yorkshire, England
- The Old Chapel, Skipton, North Yorkshire, England

== United States ==
- Old Chapel (Amherst, Massachusetts), also known as Old Chapel Library, a 19th-century building on the campus of the University of Massachusetts Amherst
- Old Chapel (Millwood, Virginia), listed on the National Register of Historic Places in Clarke County, Virginia
- Old Chapel (Indianola, Iowa), listed on the National Register of Historic Places in Warren County, Iowa
- Old Chapel Church, Penhook, Virginia
