= The Fylingdales Group of Artists =

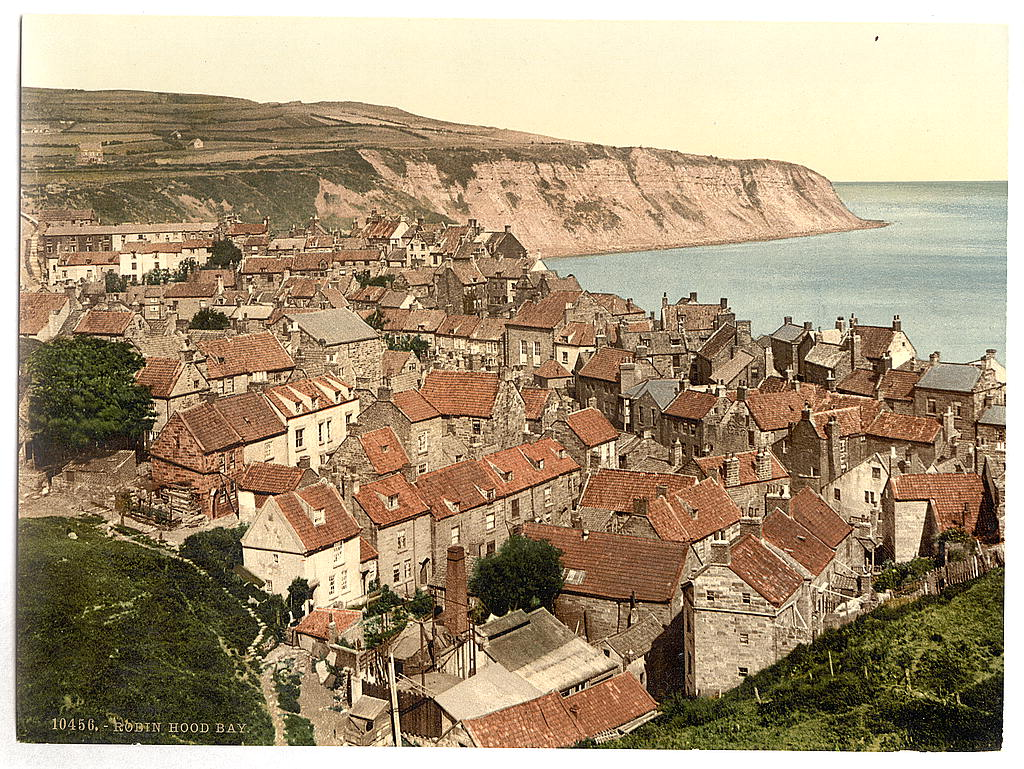
Historic view of Robin Hood's Bay, where the Fylingdales Group was founded

The Fylingdales Group of Artists is a group of Yorkshire-based artists in England.

The group was founded in 1925 at Denton Hawley's studio, located at Robin Hood's Bay in Yorkshire. Initially, there were eight members, including Owen Bowen, Dame Ethel Walke ARA, and Ulric Walmsley. The group's first meeting took place on 25 June 1925, followed by the first exhibition. Membership gradually increased and now consists of 22 artists. Later members included Harry Bateman, Colin Verity, and Joseph West.

Group membership is by invitation. The group's aim is to exhibit pictures of Yorkshire. The group has held an annual exhibition at the Pannett Art Gallery in Whitby since 1952. The group's name derives from Fylingdales near Scarborough in North Yorkshire, the civil parish in which Robin Hood's Bay is located.
