= Harry Bateman (artist) =

English artist (1896–1976)

- Born: 1896; England
- Died: 1976 (aged 79–80); England
- Occupation: Artist
- Known for: Landscape painting, drawing
- Movement: The Fylingdales Group of Artists

Harry Bateman (1896–1976) was an English artist.

Bateman volunteered for the Royal Field Artillery. During World War I, he served as a gunner and signaller in the Somme-Thiepval and Beaumont-Hamel area during April to November 1916 and was hospitalised subsequently.

Bateman was a member of the Fylingdales Group of Artists in Yorkshire. His work is in the collection of the Scarborough Art Gallery and the Imperial War Museum.
