= Walter Lucian Garstang =

British educationalist (1908–1991)

Walter Lucian Garstang (2 September 1908 – 19 September 1991) was a British educationalist. He was headmaster of Owen's School 1949–1954; of Loughborough Grammar School, 1955–1958 and finally of The John Roan School, Greenwich, from 1959 until his retirement in 1968.

Garstang was the son of the marine biologist Professor Walter Garstang and his wife Lucy (née Ackroyd). He was educated at Oundle School and Trinity College, Oxford (1927–1931). He worked as research chemist for Gas Light and Coke Company from 1931 until 1937, when he turned to teaching at Oundle, becoming an assistant master there from 1937-1944. He then was 1944-1946 an assistant master at Merchant Taylors' School, Northwood, and senior science master at Maidstone Grammar School from 1946 to 1948.

He was commissioned into the Royal Air Force, as a Pilot Officer on Probation (2 July 1930), Pilot Officer (2 July 1931), and Flying Officer (2 January 1932). He resigned his commission on 21 May 1934.
