= The Old Chapel, Robin Hood's Bay =

Church in Robin Hood's Bay, North Yorkshire, England

Coordinates: 54.431°N 0.5333°W

The former Wesleyan Chapel on Chapel Street, Robin Hood's Bay, North Yorkshire, England, was built in 1779. John Wesley is recorded as preaching there on 28 June that same year.
When built, the chapel was separated from the cliff top by a row of cottages, a road and a grass bank, but in 1780 there was a major cliff fall, bringing the cliff edge within feet of the building.
The author Leo Walmsley was educated in the chapel's schoolroom.
In 1936 a new Methodist church was opened in the upper village, and services were transferred away from the chapel.

== Alternative uses ==
Since closure as a chapel, the building has had various uses, including a time as a fisherman's store, an artist's studio (during the 1950s), an exhibition centre (from 1987), and a secondhand bookshop and vegetarian cafe (until 2005).

== The present (2007) ==
The lower floor of the Old Chapel is currently in use as a cafe and giftshop, and the upper floor (formed from the gallery area) is now the Swell Cinema.
