= Walter Garstang =

British zoologist and academic (1868–1949)

- Born: 9 February 1868
- Died: 23 February 1949 (aged 81)
- Citizenship: British
- Education: Jesus College, Oxford
- Known for: Chordate evolution Marine invertebrate larvae Zoology poems
- Spouse: Lucy Ackroyd
- Scientific career
- Fields: Marine Zoology
- Workplaces: University of Oxford; University of Leeds

Walter Garstang FLS FZS (9 February 1868 – 23 February 1949), a Fellow of Lincoln College, Oxford and Professor of Zoology at the University of Leeds, was one of the first to study the functional biology of marine invertebrate larvae. His best known works on marine larvae were his poems published as Larval Forms and Other Zoological Verses, especially The Ballad of the Veliger. They describe the form and function of several marine larvae as well as illustrating some controversies in evolutionary biology of the time.

Garstang was known for his vehement opposition to Ernst Haeckel's Biogenetic Law, now discredited. He is also noted for his hypothesis on chordate evolution, known as Garstang's theory, which suggests an alternative route for chordate evolution from echinoderms. The last-cited reference gives special attention to how the ideas of Garstang's predecessors profoundly influenced his biological theories.

== Early life ==
Walter Garstang was born on 9 February 1868 as the eldest son of Dr Walter Garstang of Blackburn and his wife Matilda Mary Wardley, and older brother of the archaeologist John Garstang.

In 1895, he married Lucy Ackroyd; they had one son, Walter Lucian Garstang, and five daughters.

== Academic career ==
In 1884, at the age of 16, he was awarded a scholarship to Jesus College, Oxford and was initially going to study medicine. Under the guidance of Henry Nottidge Moseley, he shifted to and joined the school of Zoology and graduated in 1888 at the age of 20. Before graduation, Garstang was offered a position as secretary and assistant to Gilbert C Bourne, the new resident director of the Marine Biological Association of the United Kingdom in Plymouth. There he met Ray Lankester. In 1891, he left Plymouth and was a Berkley Research Fellow under Milnes Marshall at Owens College, Manchester. A year later, Garstang returned to Plymouth as Assistant Naturalist, only to be elected a Fellow of Lincoln College, Oxford, in 1893. In 1894, while Ray Lankester held the Linacre Chair, he became a lecturer at Lincoln College and in 1895 he started the series of Easter classes in which he took students on week-long field courses to Plymouth.

Between 1902 and 1907, Garstang was employed by the MBA as the principal investigator working on North Sea fisheries. He helped to establish a fisheries laboratory in Lowestoft that was later to become the Centre for Environment, Fisheries and Aquaculture Science (Cefas), part of the Ministry of Agriculture, Fisheries and Food (United Kingdom). Garstang instigated a series of detailed fisheries surveys throughout the southern North Sea aboard the RV Huxley, under the auspices of the newly formed International Council for the Exploration of the Sea (ICES).

Garstang was Professor of Zoology at the University of Leeds from 1907 to 1933. The Garstang Building at the university is named in his honour. In 1912, in cooperation with Professor Alfred Denny of the University of Sheffield he established the Robin Hood's Bay Marine Laboratory. The minutes of Sheffield's Faculty of Pure Science on 12 March 1912 record the following resolution that was carried unanimously: That the Faculty approves of the proposal to extend the work of the Department of Zoology by co-operating with the University of Leeds in establishing a small marine Zoological Laboratory at Robin Hood's Bay.

== Evo-devo ==
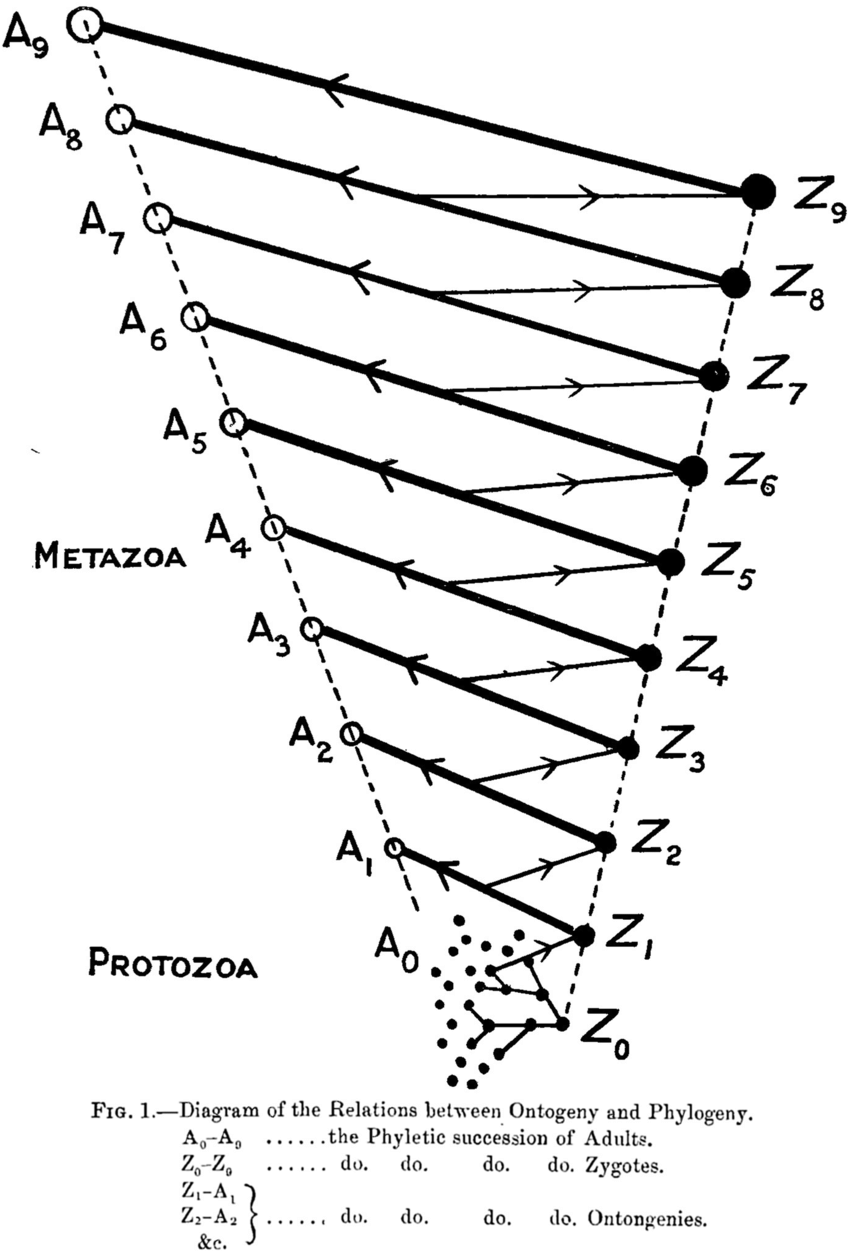
Walter Garstang's theory of recapitulation. It shows that phylogeny is not a succession of adult forms, but a succession of entire ontogenies. An early example of evo-devo thinking.

In his time, Haeckel's biogenic law was being replaced, but biologists were not sure what exactly should replace it. Some preferred to discard it completely, so that development and evolution are not related. Garstang preferred to modify it.

According to Garstang, ontogeny recapitulates phylogeny when characters at one stage of development are required for the other characters at subsequent stages. This is his "stepping stone model".

Small changes in the early embryo development can result in large changes in the adult form, a source of evolutionary novelty.

Garstang also argued that ontogeny creates [aspects of] phylogeny, in that embryonic development puts constraints on evolution, favoring particular evolutionary outcomes while excluding others.

== Garstang's hypothesis ==
A. Lancelet, B. Larval tunicate, C. Adult tunicate. 1. Notochord, 2. Neural tube, 5. Pharyngeal slit, 17. Tail

Garstang made the radical suggestion that the chordates evolved from the larvae of another group, whether the larvae of hemichordates or of echinoderms, by progenesis (which Garstang called "neoteny"). Echinoderm larvae, like chordates, are bilaterally symmetric. Especially notable are their similarities to larvae of hemichordates, which are a step closer to chordates as they share two of the five most commonly noted chordate characteristics, namely a hollow neural tube and pharyngeal slits.

is his definitive statement of the hypothesis.

Garstang's idea has been expanded and is supported by many lines of evidence. Perhaps most interesting and compelling is the fact that some amphibians can stay in larval form and still reach sexual maturity—this shows that echinoderm larvae could, theoretically, have become sexually mature and simply stopped morphing into adults, instead evolving into chordate ancestors. Species that show this refusal to leave the larval stage include mud puppies and other salamanders, which either partially or completely show neoteny (also called pedomorphism): retention of juvenile traits or phenotypes after sexual maturity.

Garstang's hypothesis (this term is also used for his proposals on gastropod torsion, as described in The Ballad of the Veliger) was revolutionary for both its time and idea: it suggests that not only may single species evolve, but that single life stages of species may evolve into separate organisms. The hypothesis, which Garstang proposed in the early 20th century, seemed far-fetched at the time of its conception and did not receive support until after Garstang's death.

== Poetry ==
=== Larval Forms and Other Zoological Verses ===
First published in 1951, two years after his death, Larval Forms and Other Zoological Verses (ISBN 978-0-226-28423-1) is a compilation of 26 poems by Garstang on the form, function and development of various larval invertebrates. Although they were published posthumously, Garstang had had a desire to publish them for many years and never did because he always thought he would add to them. Except for the introduction written by Sir Alister Hardy, everything in the final publication, including the title and order of the poems, was his own work.

Many of his poems were written to express his views on the scientific theories of the time. Most notable may be The Axolotl and the Ammocoete which speculates an evolutionary relationship between the Axolotl and the Ammocoete. Alister Hardy wrote on this in the Introduction to Larval Forms:

Only a few months before he died Garstang had drafted a communication to Nature to put forward his latest suggestion that Amphioxus might be regarded as a paedomorphic ammocoete-like larva of a Cyclostome; it was never sent, because the day on which he was to have posted it he found that the whole of his idea had recently and quite independently been published by the great Stensio.

Most of these poems were written before 1922 and reflect the knowledge and theories of that time. In some of the poems, some of the animals, or species of animals, have speaking parts. The poems included in his final work are:

Name	Theme	Speaking parts	Lines
The Amphiblastula and the Origin of Sponges	comment on theories		64
The Invaginate Gastrula and the Planula	comment on theories		24
The Origin of Cnidoblasts and Cnidozoa	theory		60
Conaria and Co.	How Conaria becomes Velella		18
Mülleria and the Ctenophore	theory that ctenophores arose from neotenic larvae of polyclads	Mülleria, ctenophore	48
The Onchosphere	development		18
The Trochophores	development		32
Mitraria's Fan Dance	how it feeds		30
The Ballad of the Veliger, or How the Gastropod got its Twist	development, theory		40
Echinospira's Double Shell	development, comments		126
The Nauplius and the Protaspis	theory that the two are related		24
Kentrogon	development into Sacculina		16
Isopod Phylogeny	comment about ideas	a baby woodlouse	12
The Millipede's Egg-tooth	theory		36
The Trilobites and After	evolution	Paradoxides, Lepidocaris, Arthropleura	72
Actinotrocha	development		14
Cyphonautes	related to Actinotrocha?		4
Echinoderm Larvae and the Origin of Quinqueradial Symmetry	development		48
The Pentacrinule	comment about larva of Antedon		30
Tornaria's Water-Works	description		56
Oikopleura, Jelly-builder	description		48
The Ancestry of Vertebrates	homologous head parts		8
Leptocephalus brevirostris, the Larva of the Eel	development		52
The Axolotl and the Ammocoete	theory		16
An Oceanographer's Dream	Bermuda as an ideal place for an oceanography base		32
To a Herring Gull	description & relationship		84

=== The Ballad of the Veliger ===
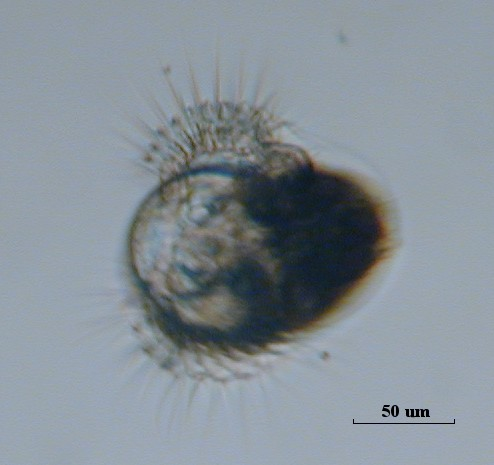
Veliger larva of sea hare Dolabrifera dolabrifera, with two curved rows of cilia, Garstang's "whirling wheel on either side" and "double screws"

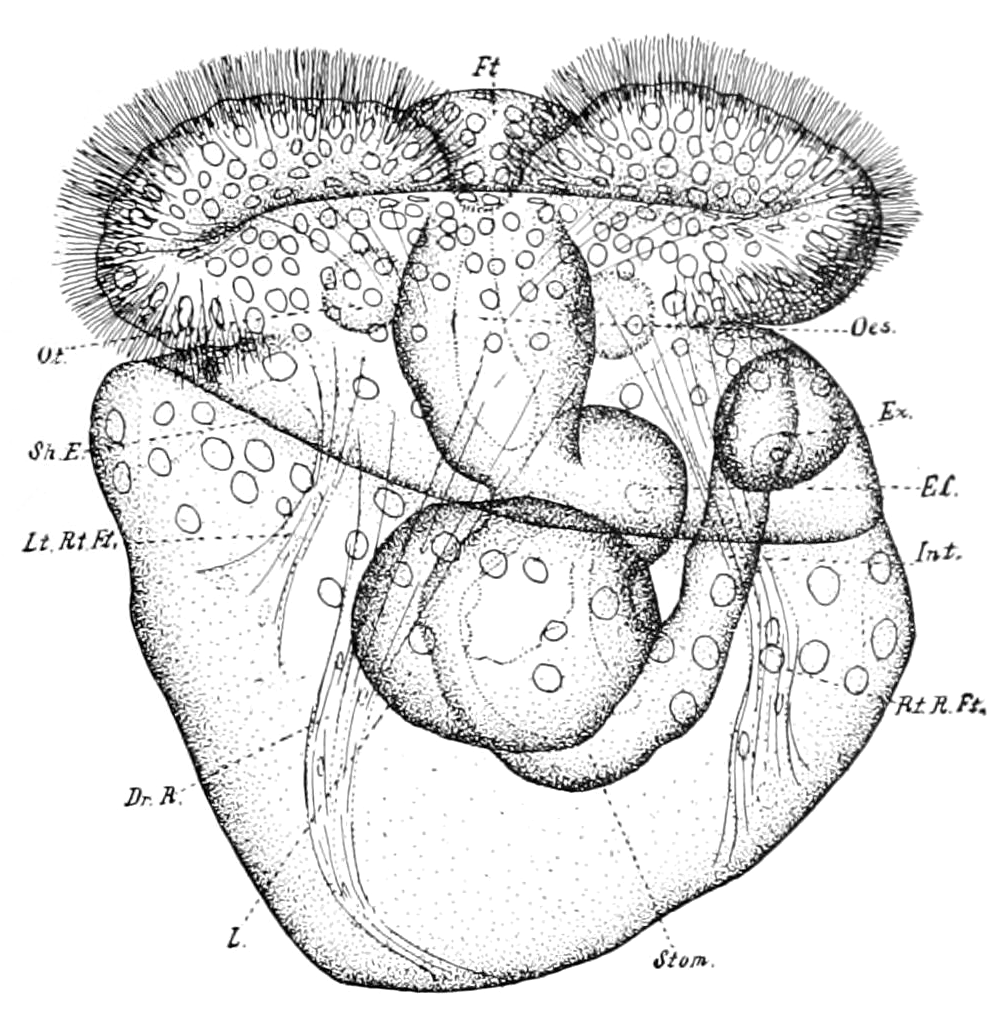
Diagram of veliger larva of sea slug Fiona pinnata

Walter Garstang's most famous zoological verse, The Ballad of the Veliger, was first published in 1928 and privately printed. Copies were handed out at that year's BA meeting, where he gave the Presidential Address to the Zoology section.

The Ballad of the Veliger or
How the gastropod got its twist

The Veliger's a lively tar, the liveliest afloat,
A whirling wheel on either side propels his little boat;
But when the danger signal warns his bustling submarine,
He stops the engine, shuts the port, and drops below unseen.

He's witnessed several changes in pelagic motor-craft;
The first he sailed was just a tub, with a tiny cabin aft.
An Archi-mollusk fashioned it, according to his kind,
He'd always stowed his gills and things in a mantle-sac behind.

Young Archi-mollusks went to sea with nothing but a velum—
A sort of autocycling hoop, instead of pram—to wheel 'em;
And, spinning round, they one by one acquired parental features,
A shell above, a foot below—the queerest little creatures.

But when by chance they brushed against their neighbours in the briny,
Coelenterates with stinging threads and Arthropods so spiny,
By one weak spot betrayed, alas, they fell an easy prey—
Their soft preoral lobes in front could not be tucked away!

Their feet, you see, amidships, next the cuddy-hole abaft,
Drew in at once, and left their heads exposed to every shaft.
So Archi-mollusks dwindled, and the race was sinking fast,
When by the merest accident salvation came at last.

A fleet of fry turned out one day, eventful in the sequel:
Whose left and right retractors on the two sides were unequal:
Their starboard halliards fixed astern alone supplied the head,
While those set aport were spread abeam and served the back instead.

Predaceous foes, still drifting by in numbers unabated,
Were baffled now by tactics which their dining plans frustrated.
Their prey upon alarm collapsed, but promptly turned about,
With the tender morsel safe within and the horny foot without!

This manoeuvre (fide Lamark) speeded up with repetition,
Until the parts affected gained a rhythmical condition,
And torsion, needing now no more a stimulating stab,
Will take its predetermined course in a watchglass in the lab.

In this way, then, the Veliger, triumphantly askew,
Acquired his cabin for'ard, holding all his sailing crew—
A Trochophore in armour cased, with a foot to work the hatch,
And double screws to drive ahead with smartness and despatch.

But when the first new Veligers came home again to shore,
And settled down as Gastropods with mantle-sac afore,
The Archi-mollusk sought a cleft his shame and grief to hide,
Crunched horribly his horny teeth, gave up the ghost, and died.

== Archives ==
The National Marine Biological Library at the Marine Biological Association in Plymouth holds some of Garstang's archival material (diaries and photographs) and documents relating to the Easter Classes. Leeds University Special Collections also holds some archival material.
