= Leo Walmsley =

English fiction writer (1892–1966)

- Leo Walmsley
- Born: Lionel Walmsley; 29 September 1892; Shipley, West Riding of Yorkshire, England
- Died: 8 June 1966 (aged 73); Fowey, Cornwall, England
- Occupation: Writer

Leo Walmsley MC (born Lionel Walmsley; 29 September 1892 – 8 June 1966) was an English writer. Walmsley was born in Shipley, West Riding of Yorkshire, but brought up in Robin Hood's Bay in the North Riding. Noted for his fictional Bramblewick series, based on Robin Hood's Bay, he fought in the Royal Flying Corps, later the Royal Air Force, in the First World War, being awarded the Military Cross.

== Life ==
He was born Lionel Walmsley, at 7 Clifton Place, Shipley in the West Riding of Yorkshire in 1892. Two years later, his family moved to Robin Hood's Bay on the coast of present-day North Yorkshire, where he was schooled at the old Wesleyan chapel and the Scarborough Municipal School. He was the son of the painter James Ulric Walmsley (1860–1954) who studied under Stanhope Forbes in Cornwall before settling in Robin Hood's Bay.

During the First World War he served as an observer with the Royal Flying Corps in East Africa, was mentioned in dispatches four times and was awarded the Military Cross. After a plane crash he was sent home, and after some time teaching at the school in Robin Hood's Bay, eventually pursued a literary career. After the war he left Robin Hood's Bay to work in London where he met his first wife. Following the end of the marriage he returned to live at Robin Hood's Bay then moved to Wales after the outbreak of World War II. Following the end of his second marriage, he moved to the area of Fowey, Cornwall, where he settled at Pont Pill near Polruan, where he became friendly with the writer Daphne du Maurier.

Walmsley was married three times. He married Elsie Susanna Preston in 1919, divorcing her in 1932. Then, in 1933, he married Margaret Bell Little, divorcing her around 1946. His final marriage was to Stephanie Gubbins, in 1955.

Many of Walmsley's books are mainly autobiographical, the best known being his Bramblewick series set in Robin Hood's Bay, with Whitby appearing as Burnharbour. His most notable works were Foreigners, Three Fevers, Phantom Lobster and Sally Lunn, the second of which was filmed as Turn of the Tide (1935). The author's note to Phantom Lobster, states that "There is no secret about Bramblewick. Its latitude and longitude are roughly 54.28.40 north, 0.34.10. west."

He died in Fowey, Cornwall, on 8 June 1966. The house he lived in at 21 Passage Street was named "Bramblewick" after his book series. The house that he lived in on King's Street in Robin Hood's Bay has a blue plaque on the outside.

== Bibliography ==
- 1914 – Guide to the Geology of Whitby and District – Horne (Whitby)
- 1919 – Fossils of the Whitby District – Horne
- 1920 – Flying and Sport in East Africa – Blackwood
- 1921 – The Silver Blimp – Nelson
- 1923 – The Lure of Thunder Island – Jenkins
- 1926 – The Green Rocket – Jenkins
- 1926 – Toro of the Little People – Hodder & Stoughton
- 1932 – Three Fevers – Cape
- 1933 – Phantom Lobster – Cape
- 1935 – Foreigners – Collins
- 1937 – Sally Lunn – Collins
- 1939 – Love in the Sun – Collins
- 1941 – Fishermen at War – Collins
- 1942 – British Ports and Harbours – Collins
- 1944 – So Many Loves (autobiography) – Collins
- 1944 – Sally Lunn (the play) – Collins
- 1948 – Master Mariner – Collins
- 1951 – Lancashire and Yorkshire – Collins
- 1952 – Invisible Cargo – Joseph
- 1954 – The Golden Waterwheel – Collins
- 1957 – The Happy Ending – Collins
- 1959 – Sound of the Sea – Collins
- 1963 – Paradise Creek – Collins
- 1965 – Angler's Moon – Hamilton

== Biographies ==
- 1944 – So Many Loves – Leo Walmsley (autobiography)
- 1991 – The Honey Gatherers – Peter J. Woods
- 1995 – Autumn Gold – Stephanie Walmsley (his widow)
- 2001 – Shells and Bright Stones – Nona Stead (ed.)
