= Tees Valley Metro =

Proposed transport system in England

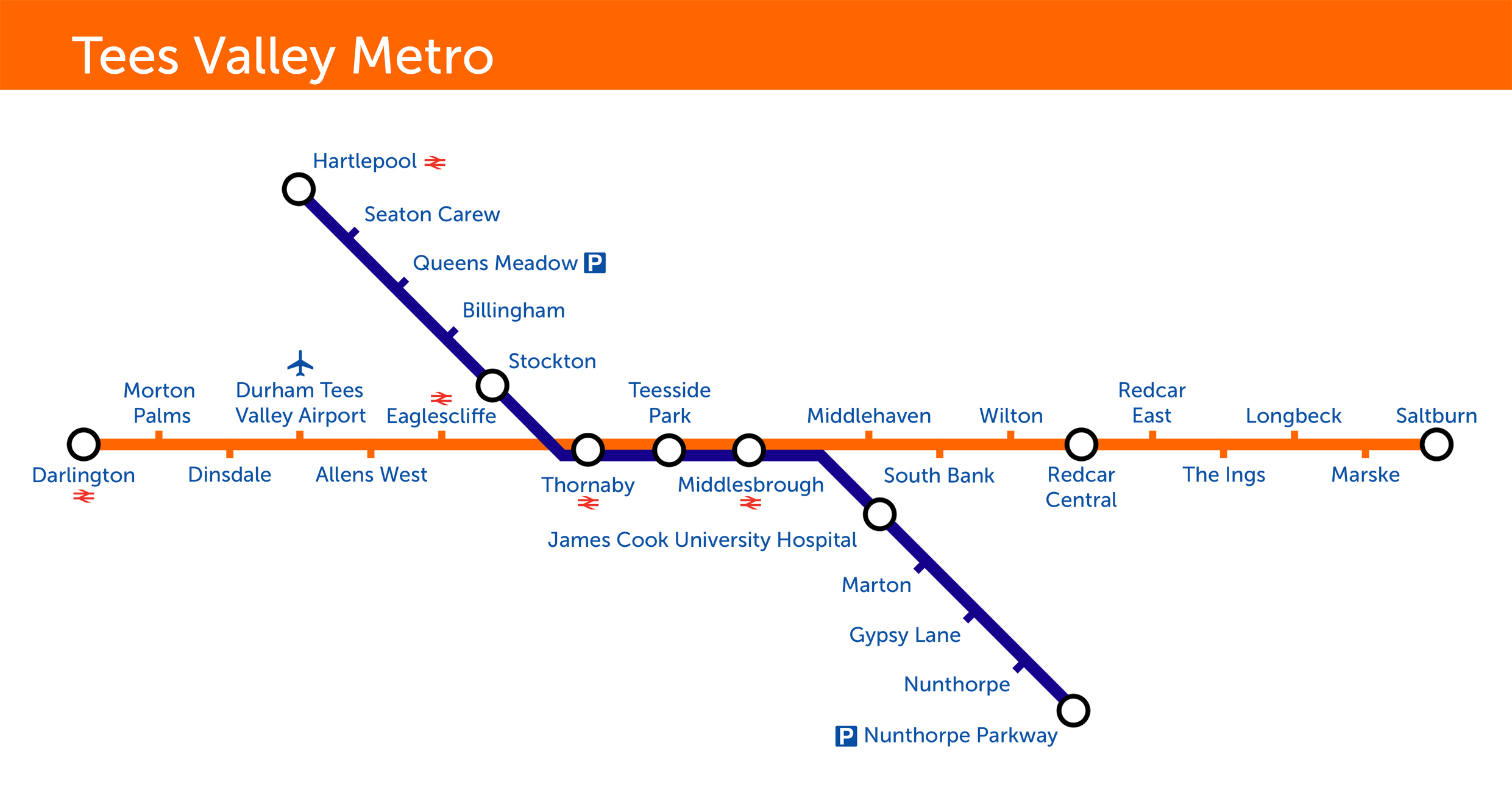
- mapped proposed route

Overview
- Status: Project cancelled by Government in 2010.
- Locale: Teesside and the rest of Dale of the Tees, England

Service
- Type: Metro, Commuter Rail
- Services: Line 1 (Darlington via Middlesbrough to Saltburn); Line 2 (Hartlepool to Nunthorpe Parkway)

Technical
- Track gauge: 4 ft 8 1/2 in (1,435 mm) standard gauge

The Tees Valley Metro was a project to upgrade the Tees Valley Line and sections of the Esk Valley Line and Durham Coast Line to provide a faster and more frequent service across the North of England. In the initial phases the services would have been heavy rail mostly along existing alignments. The later phase would have introduced tram-trains to allow street running. The project was backed by all the local authorities through which the system would have run: Darlington, Hartlepool, Middlesbrough, Redcar & Cleveland and Stockton-on-Tees. Support was also forthcoming from the Department for Transport. The project was cancelled due to lack of funding, with the focus moving to the Northern Rail franchise.

Of the original Tees Valley Metro project, only the construction of a new station at James Cook University Hospital in 2014 has come to fruition, as well as the redevelopment of Hartlepool Station in 2024.

A number of the initially planned projects received preliminary funding in 2024, including expansion to Darlington station, improvements at Eaglescliffe, Thornaby and Teesside Airport, and the construction of a new Teesside Park station.

== Route ==
The proposed initial routes would have used sections of the Tees Valley, Esk Valley and Durham Coast Lines. There were no plans as to the interoperability of the existing services and the planned metro services, but would have been considered at the next stage of the process. Several new stations would have been built across two phases.

Additional routes using street running were to be considered after Stage 2 was implemented.

== Detailed plans ==
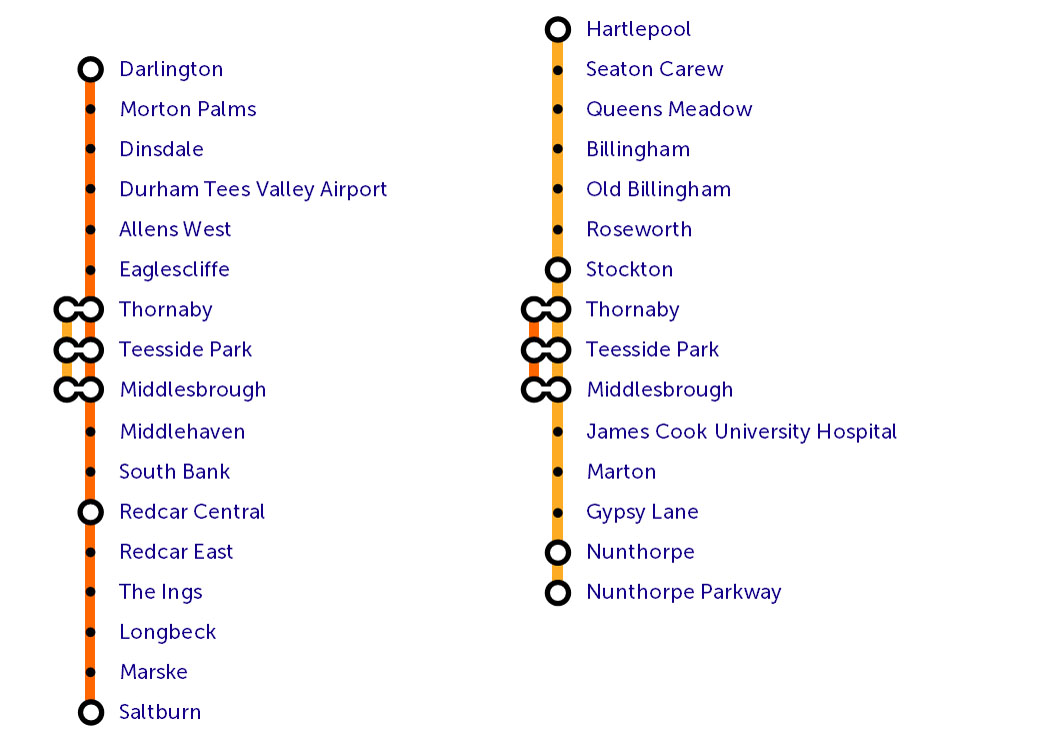
The two proposed lines of the Metro.

The project was planned to be delivered in two phases, with the first phase split into stages and further projects being delivered after.

In 2007, the full cost of the project was finalised as being £141.9 million, with an estimate of £88.8 million being allocated from existing funding. This left a £45 million funding gap, of which an estimated £14 million could be secured from local authorities with each of the 5 paying £3 million each. This was against an estimated £400 million of GVA benefits being generated for the community, which would be a £1 to £2.80 cost return. By August 2009, project costs had increased to £220 million.

It was also calculated that the running cost of the regional rail system would increase from £5.7 million to £6.6 million a year, but due to predicted increased passenger revenue, would also result in £1.5 million less per year in subsidy payments for the central Government.

=== Phase 1 - Stage 1 ===
Initial work was proposed to be complete by December 2012 and would have included new stations, rollingstock and timetable improvements, and station upgrades.

==== Service and rolling stock improvements ====
- An increase in services from 1–2 to four trains per hour on the Tees Valley Line between Darlington and Saltburn.
- A reduction in journey time from 58 minutes to 48 between Darlington and Saltburn.
- Construction of additional trackage for future capacity.
- New rolling stock which would be more modern and lighter than existing stock (Possibly refurbished Class 156 "Sprinters" rolling stock) (New rollingstock was also mentioned for Phase 2).

==== Station upgrades ====
- Possible new platforms at Middlesbrough, and a new entrance to the north of the station creating access points for the Boho and Middlehaven developments.
- Darlington Station would have had two new bay platforms on the east side to reduce the need for local services to cross the East Coast Main Line. The new platforms would be connected to the main building by a new footbridge and lifts. The existing car parking places that would have been lost with the new platforms would be replaced at a similar distance from the station, and a new entrance, including pick-up/drop-off facilities, was considered on the eastern side.
- Eaglescliffe station receiving new ticket office, waiting facility, outdoor shelters, electronic information displays, and possible extension to car park (occurred after cancellation) (new footbridge started 2024).
- Thornaby station having footbridge replaced with a modern structure (occurred after cancellation).
- Redcar Central Station upgrades were considered for upgrading the existing footbridge, waiting shelters and passenger information facilities. There would also be three new pedestrian links – one each to the new civic quarter, to the town centre and new seafront and to Redcar & Cleveland College, as well as a new bus/rail interchange and pick-up/drop-off facilities (occurred after cancellation).
- Saltburn Station would receive new shelters and new electronic information displays (occurred after cancellation).
- Hartlepool Station would receive a new glazed waiting area on the main platform. The existing bay platform would have been repaved and new waiting shelters provided and the north side platform would have been resurfaced and had new artwork installed. New electronic information screens would also have been provided. There was also mention of a new bus/rail interchange.

==== New stations ====
- Relocation of Teesside Airport station to serve Durham Tees Valley Airport (Airport is now Teesside International) better. The new station would have been near the road bridge that connects the Airport link road to the A67 as well as a planned new hotel development. A platform in each direction would have been provided, along with stairs and ramps to the road bridge. A new waiting area was also discussed, potentially with electronic information screens displaying rail and air departure information. The station would have been linked to the terminal via a separate footpath, with bus connections also been located at the terminal.
- A station at Wilton (possibly a relocation/renaming of Redcar British Steel).
- A new station at James Cook University Hospital (opened 2014 after project cancellation).

These improvements were estimated to cost £30 – 40 million.

=== Phase 1 - Stage 2 ===
The second stage of Phase 1 was due to be completed in December 2014.

- New stations at Teesside Park (construction started 2024), Morton Park and Middlehaven.
- New rolling stock, Class 172 Turbostar was put forward. (New rollingstock was also mentioned for Phase 2)
- Refurbishment of other stations on Route 1.

The cost of these improvements was estimated at £50 – 60 million.

=== Phase 2 ===
==== Service and rolling stock ====
- Track capacity and signalling improvements along the Darlington to Saltburn line (providing east – west connections).
- Improvements to existing stations along the route.
- Examination of the best means of replacing life-expired rolling stock to allow increased frequencies whilst minimising any increase in operating costs.
- (New rollingstock was also mentioned to be delivered in Phase 2, in contradiction to other documents).
- Ensuring that the network is capable of accommodating 9’6” freight containers. This mainly involves platform alterations, changes to rail signals, partial reconstruction of the overbridge at Dinsdale rail station, and upgrading the freight rail network to W10 gauge clearance. This is to support the growth of PD Ports logistics platform at Teesport.

==== New stations ====
- Morton Palms
- Teesside Park
- The Ings
- Hartlepool Interchange
- Middlehaven (May also have been constructed in an unconfirmed Phase 3)
- Nunthorpe Parkway
- Queens Meadow (May have been constructed in an unconfirmed Phase 3)
- (Teesside Airport was also mentioned to be constructed in Phase 2 instead of Phase 1)

=== Further details ===
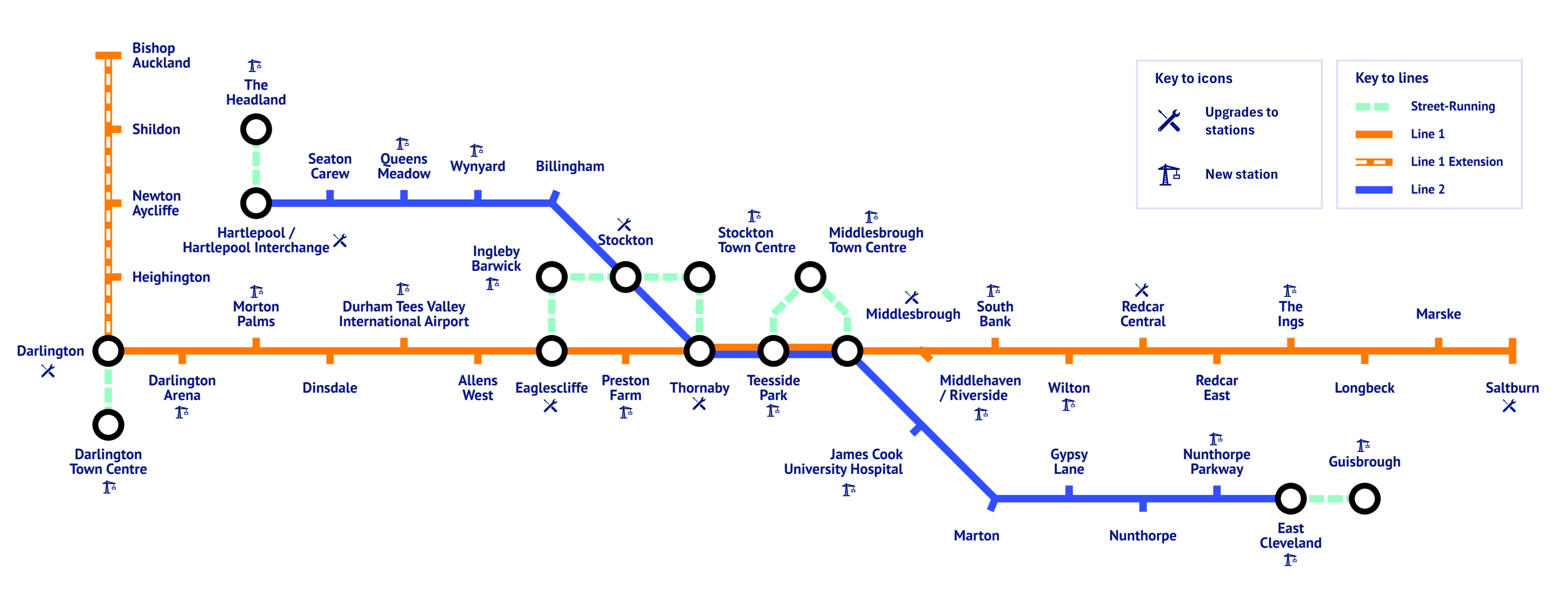
Transit diagram showcasing all discussed or mentioned ideas for the Tees Valley Metro.

During press releases, executive documents, and draft business cases, numerous further improvements and additional infrastructure was mentioned that would occur outside the two core phases, were mentioned in an unconfirmed "Phase 3", or were not given details as to when they would occur.

==== Infrastructure and improved heavy rail services ====
There was also mention of the Boldon East Curve reinstatement, York-Northallerton and Northallerton-Eaglescliffe line speed increases, and Stillington Branch signalling and line speed improvements.

Release of track capacity on the ECML to allow more trains to run from Darlington to York and Newcastle.

Enhanced heavy rail connections along the Durham Coast line, including Grand Central.

Fast and frequent connections to the ECML at Darlington, TransPennine Express services stopping at Thornaby, and Grand Central services for Eaglescliffe and Teesside Airport.

==== Additional stations ====
- New Riverside Stadium station for Middlesbrough Football Club (possibly an alternative name for Middlehaven).
- New East Cleveland Park and Ride (possibly an alternative name for Nunthorpe Parkway).
- Possible new stations around Eaglescliffe, Preston Farm, and Thornaby.
- Hartlepool Interchange integrating both bus and rail services (possibly only a name for a bus hub adjacent to the station like what was created after).
- New Mowden Park station for Darlington Arena (possibly an alternative name for Morton Palms), which would have served Darlington F.C. but is now home to Darlington Mowden Park R.F.C.
- Further extension with stations in Guisborough.
- Further extension with stations in Bishop Auckland.
- Further extension with stations in Wynyard.
- Further extension with stations in Ingleby Barwick.
- Further extension with stations in the Headland.

==== Street-running trams ====
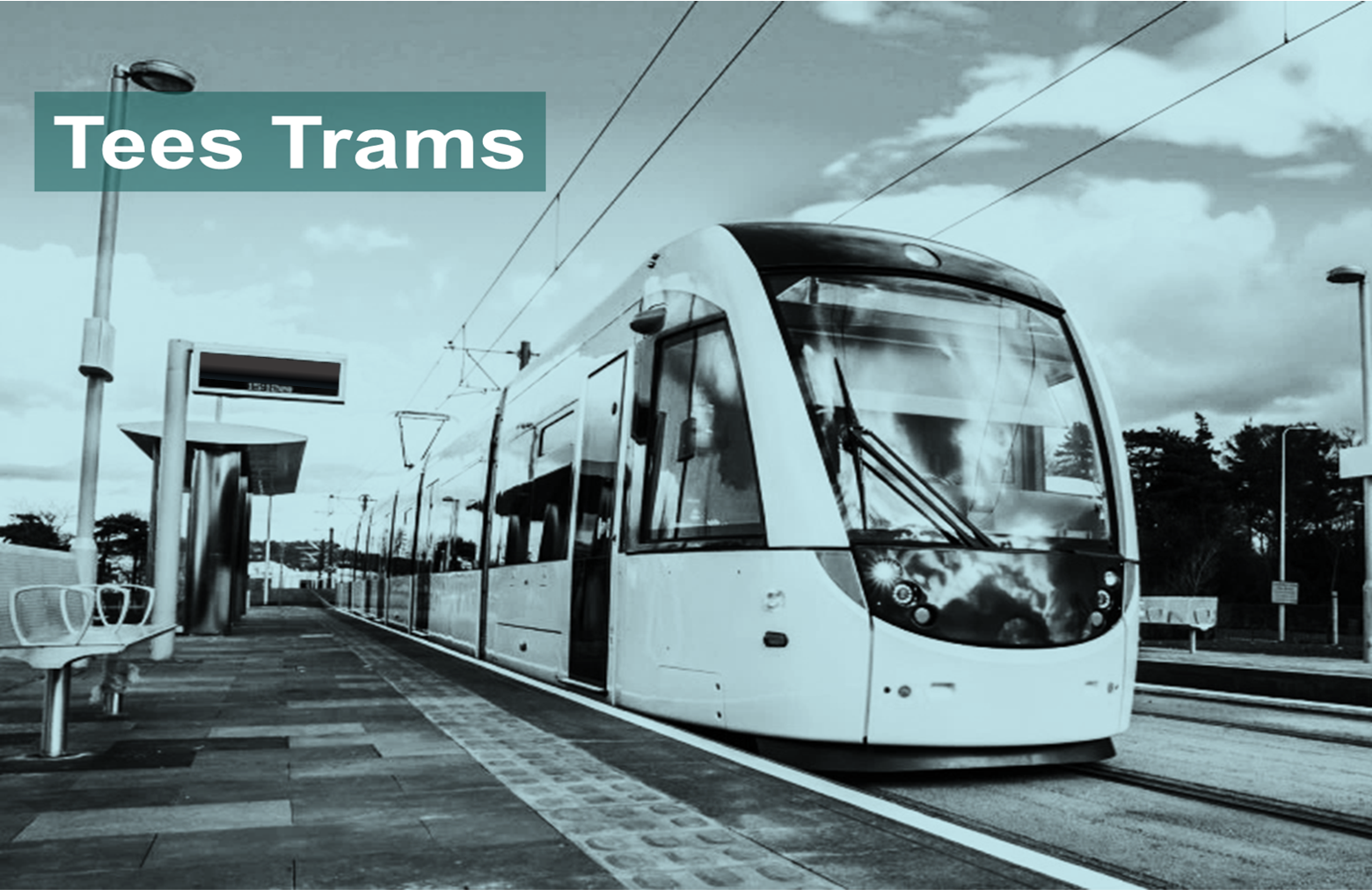
Tees Valley trams proposal revealed by Mayor Ben Houchen on 15 Jan 2024.

Further details about the project also involved possible further extensions to Guisborough, Bishop Auckland, Wynyard, Ingleby Barwick, East Cleveland, and The Headland at Hartlepool once the first two phases ended. This had possible street-running sections as listed below.

Proposed Further Street-Running Extensions [Source:]
Start	End
Darlington	Darlington Town Centre
Stockton-On-Tees	Stockton Town Centre
Stockton-On-Tees	Ingleby Barwick
Redcar and Cleveland	Guisborough
Middlesbrough	Middlesbrough Town Centre

==== Bus network ====
There was also the expansion of the Tees Valley Bus Network as well as integration of metro stations into its system, as well as the creation of express bus services where heavy rail/metro services are not economically viable in the short term.

== Timeline and shelving ==
In November 2005, Darlington MP and former Health Secretary Alan Milburn first started partitioning that the Tyne and Wear Metro network to be extended into County Durham and Teesside. In 2006, this evolved to being a business case being submitted to the Department for Transport by all of the involved local authorities, as well as Tees Valley Regeneration, with a reply from the DfT being given by the end of 2007.

In March 2007 the Tees Valley Metro was mentioned within a parliamentary debate, where the Secretary of State for Transport at the time (Tom Harris) stated the Department for Transport had "no plans to fund the development of a Tees Valley Metro system and has received no request to do so".

The project had originally received approval from the Interim Regional Transport Board in September 2008, allowing more detailed plans and a public consultation to go ahead. Construction of the first phase was due to commence in 2010 and would have been completed by the end of 2013. Phase one would cost around £80 million and Network Rail had already committed £40 million for signalling improvements. The second phase would cost a further £140 million and would have been in place by 2018.

In March 2009, the Secretary of State for Transport at the time (Paul Clark), stated that the DfT was making "£5.46 million available to Middlesbrough over the three financial years, 2008-11" for general funding to transport which could be used for its plans. He also stated that the DfT was "committed to working with the Tees Valley Metro promoters to help them to develop their business case".

In June 2009, Nick Brown Minister for the North-East, said he could not guarantee that the work done in phase one would lead to a Metro service and stated that there was “no permission for phase two or three” from the DfT.

On 23 July 2009 the project received £23 million in-principle funding from the Department for Transport via the Regional Funding Allocation process. Each of the individual components were treated as an individual project, eligible for fast track funding. Funding was expected for the two new platforms at Darlington, the reopening of platform 3 at Middlesbrough, the relocation of Teesside Airport station to within 350m of the terminal building, improvements at Eaglescliffe, Thornaby and Hartlepool, including new lifts and footbridges, and the new station at James Cook University Hospital. Reports also mentioned a possible new station between Middlesbrough and Redcar Central, proposed as a new station for Wilton International, reopening Grangetown Station or improving and bringing South Bank station fully into use, possible relocation of Redcar British Steel station, as well as infrastructure and rolling stock improvements and increased train frequency.

In August 2009, the cost of the project increased, going from £140 million to £220 million reportedly due to inflation, however £70 million for signalling upgrades had been confirmed from Network Rail.

The project was officially shelved by central Government and Tees Valley Unlimited due to lack of funding and a lack of interest in the project from Network Rail. The project has effectively been cancelled due to funding goals being changed by the incoming Conservative government in 2010 and the scheme failing to acquire funding in 2011 and 2012. It was not listed in the 2012 £1.5bn Government transport package, and in 2011 the £9.05m light rail network bid was questioned over value/cost estimates.

In 2020, at the time Leader of the Opposition Sir Keir Starmer, urged Rishi Sunak's government to "sort this issue and give the Tees Valley the infrastructure it needs" and saying that "the Tees Valley Metro would have provided a faster and more frequent service across the area".

== Implemented after shelving ==
A number of the projects first put forward by the project have been initially funded or reproposed as independent projects since the ending of the project in 2010. Improvements to Darlington, Eaglescliffe, Thornaby, and Teesside International Airport received preliminary funding in 2024. This also includes construction of two new platforms at Darlington (already started as part of the Darlington station redevelopment plan in 2022) as laid out in the Metro plan, and a new station at Teesside Park. There is also £20 million allocated for "15 trackless autonomous electric trams in town centres".

Rail services provided by Northern Rail were altered to try and marginally improve journey times.

In 2012, Saltburn station was improved. The package for this station included new waiting shelters, decorative planting schemes, renewed station signage, a digital information screen displaying live departures, and the installation of CCTV. The long-line Public Address system (PA) was also renewed and upgraded with pre-recorded train announcements.

At the same time as Saltburn station, Redcar station was also improved in 2012. A new pedestrian access to the westbound platform and ticket office from West Dyke Road was created. Additional lighting, CCTV and cycle parking facilities were also added. For the eastbound station facilities new Lighting, CCTV, help points, shelters and signage were installed.

In 2014, a new railway station at the rear of James Cook University Hospital was built and opened.

In May 2014, Thornaby Railway Station's ticket office was refurbished and extended. The Government, whilst not ensuring, requested that the new franchise holder from 2016 onwards must attempt to refurbish or replace 35 year old Pacer trains in use at the time.

Pacer trains began to be removed in 2019 from the network and were replaced with refurbished class 156 Sprinters from elsewhere.

In December 2023, a £150 million pound plan was unveiled for the creation of a Teesside Park rail and bus station and improvements to Thornaby Station. The new station would also connect with the new Care and Health Innovation Zone at the Tees Marshalling Yards.

In January 2024, £6 million was earmarked for the reopening of Teesside Airport railway station.

In May 2024, improvements to Eaglescliffe Station started, with a new footbridge connecting to the west side as well as the existing footbridge and ramps refurbished, with new waiting areas and taxi office being added as part of the project.

As of 2 June 2024, platform 3 at Hartlepool has been brought back into use with Northern introducing 3 trains every two hours at peak times on the Durham Coastline.

In August 2024, the initial renders of the redeveloped Darlington train station were released. The plan involves the creation of two additional platforms, access to the roof via a new footbridge, and the creation of a new concourse and multistory carpark.

In August 2024, Tees Valley Mayor Ben Houchen unveiled proposals of ''15 trackless autonomous electric trams in five town centres" in a £20 million plan.

== Tees Valley Mayor rail plans ==
Proposals remain the same for rail across the Tees Valley with the Tees Valley Mayor (Ben Houchen) continuing the promise of trains twice an hour across the Tees Valley, with proposals dating back as early as 2013. This change as its stated will not take place without further funding from Department for Transport and private sector contributions. As of 2021 this has still not happened and neither currently have plans to do this.

Northern currently have put out to tender for the provision of new rolling stock to replace all class 15x units by 2028. As of June 2024 no orders have been placed or plans submitted to the DfT or DFTO. Northern and DfT have not committed to new trains for the Tees Valley and may again use diesel trains from elsewhere to replace the current Sprinter fleet.

Northern have stated that new trains could be up to 10 years away and for Tees Valley “they may be cascaded diesel rolling stock from elsewhere.”

In 2025, Northern Trains shortlisted suppliers of new rolling stock over the next 10 years, with new trains starting to enter service in 2030 missing the original 2028 date as stated by the DfT.

The plan from Northern as of January 2025 is now to replace only classes 150-156 Sprinters, however the Tees Valley will not receive these new trains and instead receive cascades of class 158 Express Sprinter diesel units to cover the whole of the North East until at least 2035 and possibly beyond. Northern New Trains

As of November 2025, the introduction of new fleet from Northern is now expected to be 2031/32 which will impact delivery of cascades to the Tees Valley.

September 2026, the Government announced 29 new trains had been ordered from Alstom for GBR | TPE and would not be delivered until 2034 and will only potentially support Manchester to Teesside routes TPE New Trains As of the end of 2026 Northern has still not placed orders for new fleet, this is still pending a business case to the DfT to be supported by Transport for the North, TfN Rail North Consultation Call Sep 2026 and no guarantee this will include new rolling stock for the Tees Valley.

In October 2026 as reported by Rail Magazine the funding for new fleet of bi-mode or tri-mode trains has been delayed again and may be cancelled as funding via RoSCo’s is not possible for non-electric vehicles, this is highly likely civil service speak for they have been cancelled and therefore no new rolling stock for non-electrified routes will be procured and given that Northern has acquired a cascaded fleet of class 350 units the whole project for a new fleet will likely be shelved.
