= Redcar railway station =

Redcar railway station may refer to:

- Redcar Central railway station
- Redcar East railway station
- British Steel Redcar railway station
