= Cargo Fleet railway station =

Disused railway station in England

Cargo Fleet
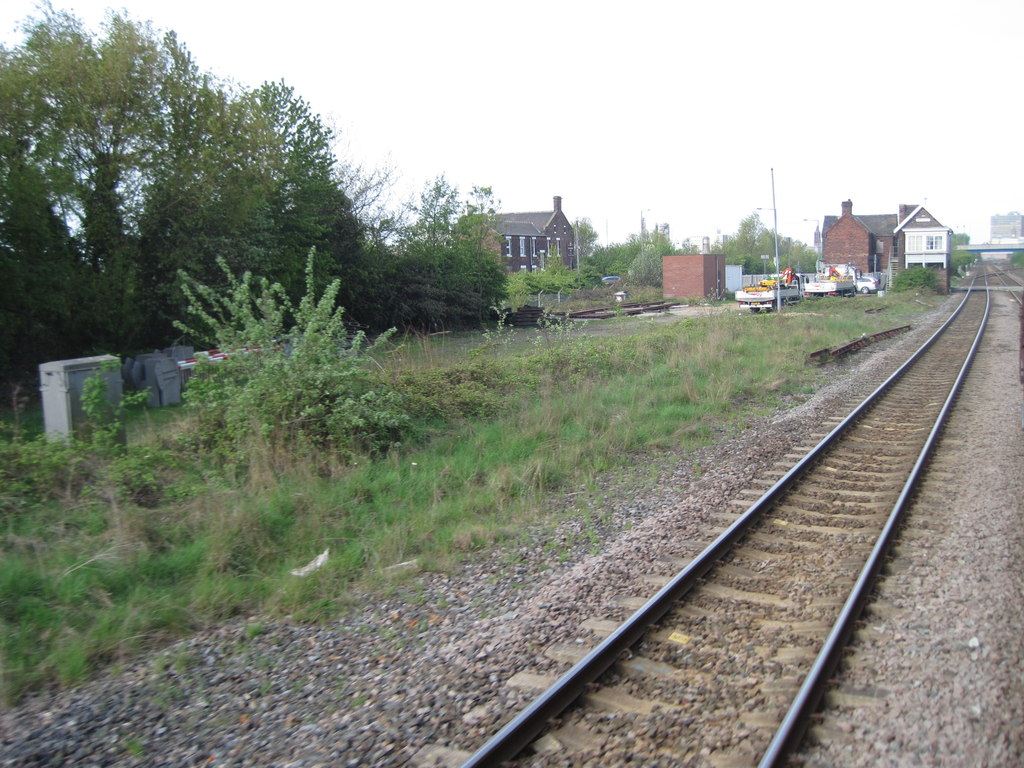
- The site of the station, looking west towards Middlesbrough, in 2010

General information
- Location: Cargo Fleet, Middlesbrough; England
- Coordinates: 54.577°N 1.2094°W
- Grid reference: NZ512204
- Platforms: 2

Other information
- Status: Disused

History
- Original company: North Eastern Railway
- Pre-grouping: North Eastern Railway
- Post-grouping: LNER; British Railways (North Eastern); British Rail (Eastern)

Key dates
- 8 November 1885: Opened
- 22 January 1990: Closed
Location

Cargo Fleet railway station served the Cargo Fleet area of Middlesbrough, North East England from 1885 to 1990 as a stop on the Tees Valley line.

== History ==
The station was opened on 8 November 1885 by the North Eastern Railway. The main part of the station was constructed from materials recovered from the closed Middlesbrough excursion station, which saved the North Eastern Railway £1,600 (equivalent to £178,000 in 2025). It was an island platform situated a mile east of Middlesbrough station, adjacent to Dockside Road, between junctions with Marsh Road and Works Road. Cargo Fleet was a passenger only station, although there were sidings nearby which handled goods traffic. The 1904 RCH handbook recorded that the sidings served two ironworks, (one that served a brickworks and a wharf) a warrant stores, a timber yard and wharves, a salt works and a wharf.

On 4 May 1969 the station was one of many to be reduced to an 'unstaffed halt', which meant that the station was attractive to vandals. By 1972 the windows were boarded up, the brickwork had graffiti all over it, the lamps were smashed and the posters were ripped to the point where only peelings remained. After these buildings were demolished, a small brick shelter was built with electric lighting.

Due to the low population of Cargo Fleet (in 1911 it was estimated to have only 682 residents) and the closure of nearby factories on the line, there was very little passenger demand. British Rail realised that the station would require an outlay of £60,000 if it remained open, so it closed completely on 22 January 1990.

Preceding station	Disused railways	Following station
South Bank; Line and station open	London and North Eastern Railway; Tees Valley Line	Middlesbrough; Line and station open
