= Newton Aycliffe railway station =

Railway station in County Durham, England

Newton Aycliffe
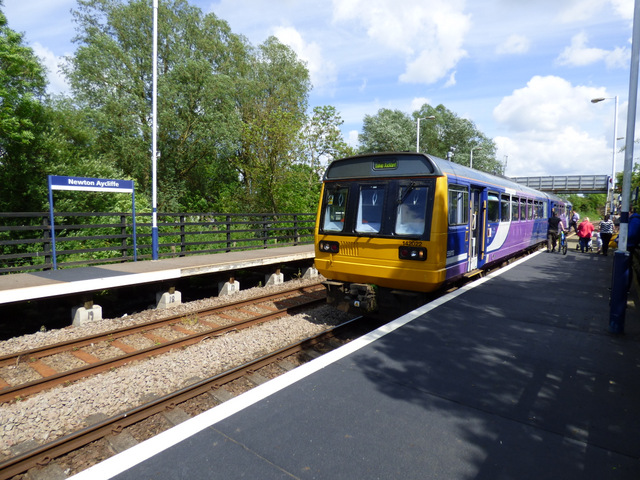

General information
- Location: Newton Aycliffe, County Durham; England
- Coordinates: 54°36′49″N 1°35′23″W
- Grid reference: NZ265243
- Owner: Network Rail
- Manager: Northern Trains
- Platforms: 2
- Tracks: 2

Other information
- Station code: NAY
- Classification: DfT category F1

History
- Original company: British Rail (Eastern Region)

Key dates
- 9 January 1978: Opened

Passengers
- 2021/22: ▲74,760
- 2022/23: ▲85,142
- 2023/24: ▼77,578
- 2024/25: ▲78,114
- 2025/26: ▲87,214
Location
- Location within County Durham
Notes
- Passenger statistics from the Office of Rail and Road

Newton Aycliffe is a railway station on the Tees Valley Line, which runs between Bishop Auckland and Saltburn via Darlington. The station, situated 7 miles 4 chains (11.3 km) north-west of Darlington, serves the town of Newton Aycliffe in County Durham, England. It is owned by Network Rail and managed by Northern Trains.

== History ==
The station is located on the original alignment of the Stockton and Darlington Railway, where it junctioned with the Clarence Railway at what was then known as Simpasture Junction.

The station is a relatively recent addition, having only opened by British Rail on 9 January 1978.

== Facilities ==
Station facilities here have been improved as part of the Tees Valley Metro project. The package for this station included new fully lit waiting shelters, digital CIS displays, renewed station signage and the installation of CCTV. In 2018, Arriva Rail North installed a ticket machine. The long-line Public Address system (PA) has been renewed and upgraded with pre-recorded train announcements.

== Services ==
As of the May 2021 timetable change, the station is served by an hourly service between Saltburn and Bishop Auckland via Darlington. All services are operated by Northern Trains.

Rolling stock used: Class 156 Super Sprinter and Class 158 Express Sprinter

| Preceding station | National Rail | Following station |
|---|---|---|
| Heighington | Northern Trains; Tees Valley Line | Shildon |
