= Newport (North Yorkshire) railway station =

Disused railway station in Middlesbrough, North Yorkshire, England

Newport (Middlesbrough)
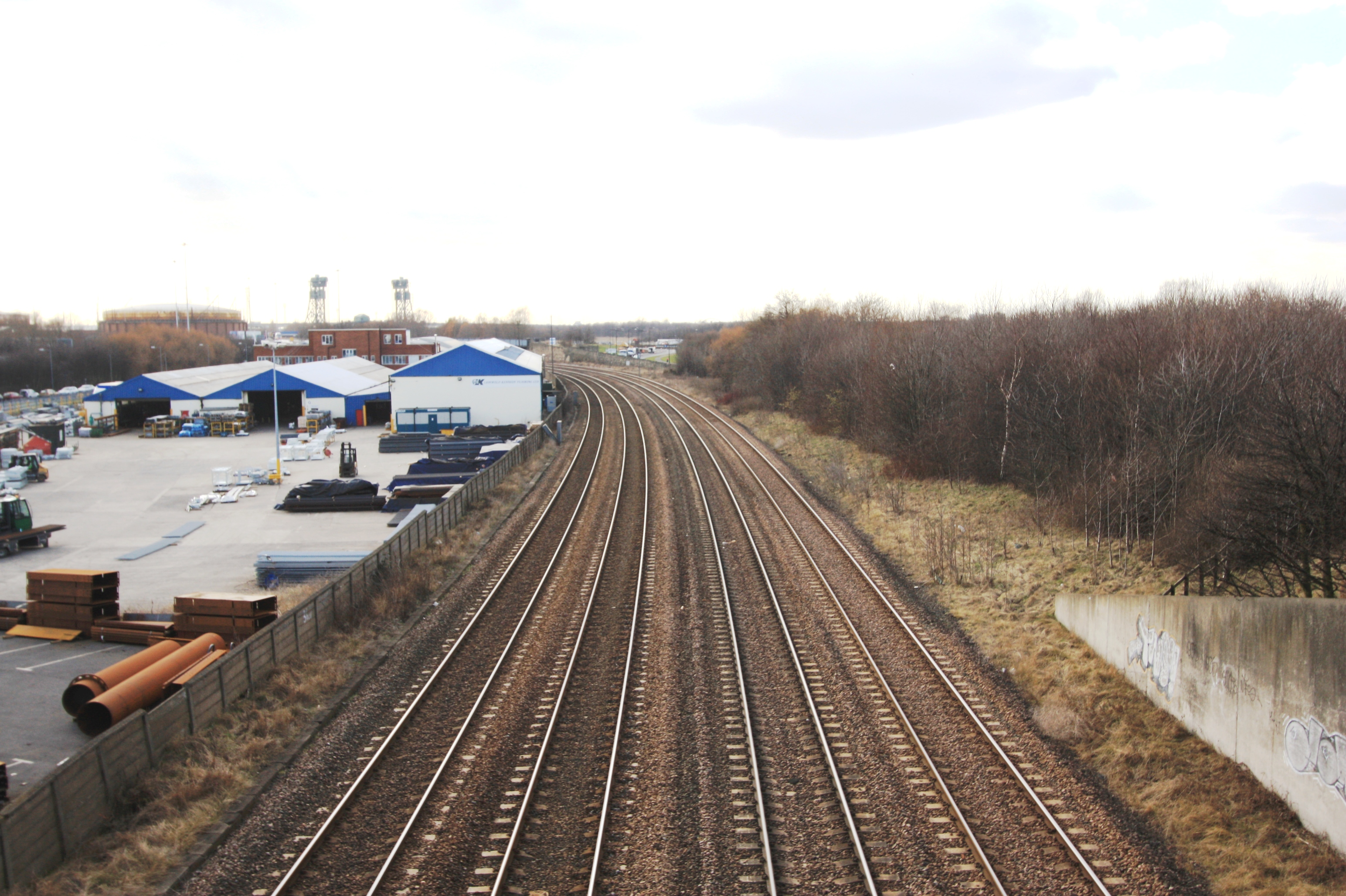
- Tracks near the site at Newport Bridge in Middlesbrough

General information
- Location: Middlesbrough, Borough of Middlesbrough, North Yorkshire; England
- Coordinates: 54.571°N 1.259°W

Other information
- Status: Disused

History
- Original company: Stockton and Darlington Railway
- Pre-grouping: North Eastern Railway

Key dates
- 27 December 1830: Opened
- 8 August 1915: Closed
Location

Newport railway station served the suburb of Newport in Middlesbrough, Borough of Middlesbrough, in North Yorkshire, England from 1830 to 1915 on the Middlesbrough branch of the Stockton and Darlington Railway.

== History ==
The station was opened on 27 December 1830 by the Stockton and Darlington Railway. It closed on 8 August 1915, although it continued to be used for excursions in 1932 and 1956.

Preceding station	Disused railways	Following station
Thornaby; Line and station open	Stockton and Darlington Railway	Middlesbrough; Line and station open
