= Redcar British Steel railway station =

Disused railway station in North Yorkshire, England

Redcar British Steel British Steel Redcar
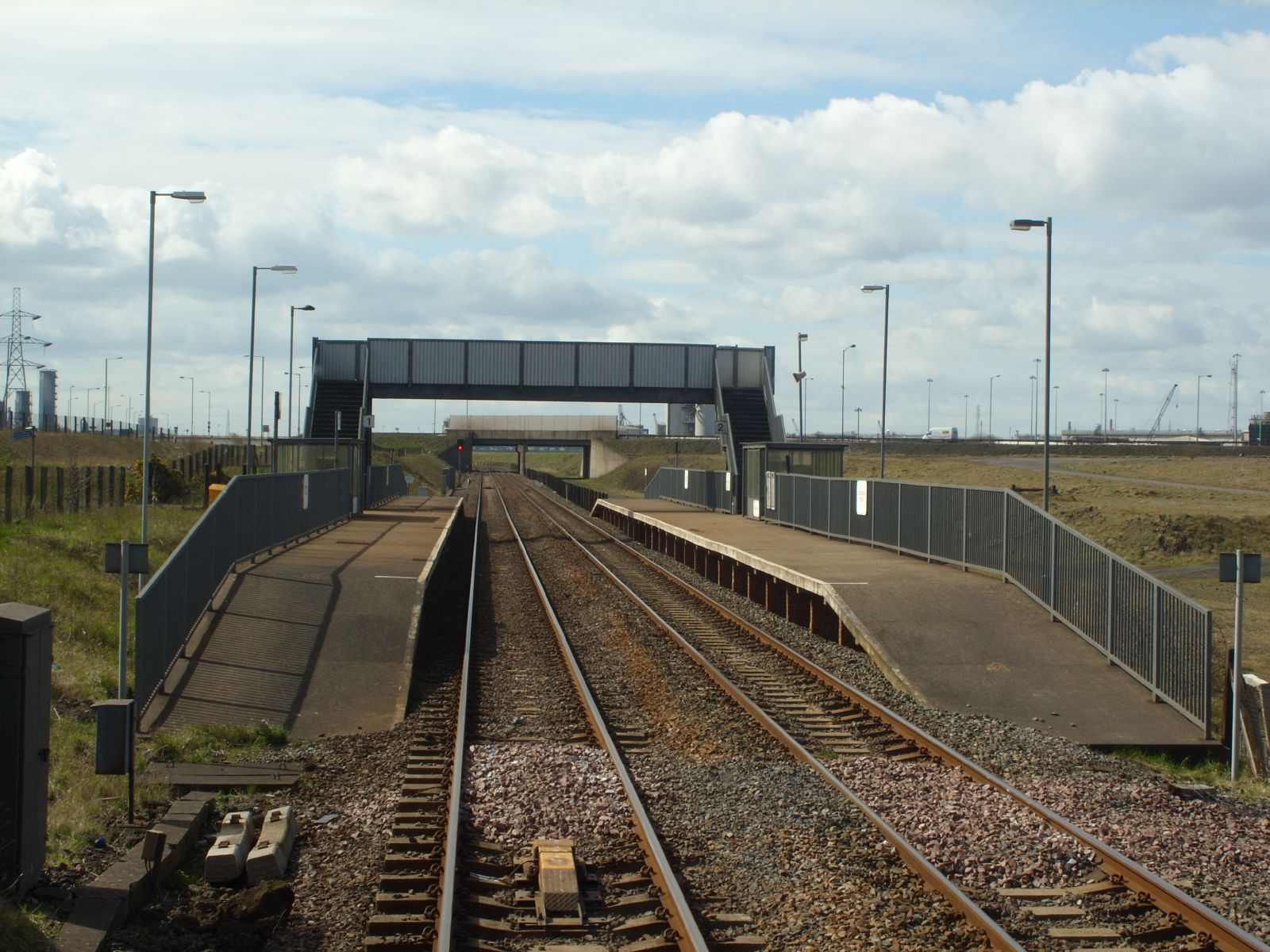
- The station in 2008, viewed from a train cab

General information
- Location: Redcar, Redcar and Cleveland; England
- Coordinates: 54°36′35″N 1°06′45″W
- Grid reference: NZ573241
- Owner: National Rail
- Manager: Northern Trains
- Platforms: 2
- Tracks: 2

Other information
- Status: Services suspended
- Station code: RBS
- Classification: DfT category F2

History
- Original company: British Rail (Eastern Region)

Key dates
- 19 June 1978: Opened
- 14 December 2019: Services suspended

Passengers
- 2015/16: ▼740
- 2016/17: ▼50
- 2017/18: ▼40
- 2018/19: ▲360
- 2019/20: ▲1,060 (Note: Services were permanently suspended starting 14 December 2019)
Location
Notes
- Passenger statistics from the Office of Rail and Road

Redcar British Steel (also known as British Steel Redcar) is a mothballed railway station on the Tees Valley Line, which runs between Bishop Auckland and Saltburn via Darlington. The station, situated 5 3/4 miles (9 km) east of Middlesbrough, served the Teesside Steelworks, Redcar and Cleveland in North Yorkshire, England. At the time of the suspension of services, the station was owned by Network Rail and managed by Arriva Rail North.

== History ==
The station was opened by British Rail on 19 June 1978. It is situated on a re-sited portion of route that was commissioned to allow the previous alignment to be used for an expansion of the Teesside Steelworks. This included a station at Warrenby Halt, which was closed and replaced by the current station.

Arriva Rail North suspended services from the station on 14 December 2019. However, work to regenerate the site of the former Teesside Steelworks is being undertaken by South Tees Development Corporation, which aims to redevelop the station and improve services.

== Facilities ==
At the time of the suspension of services the station had two platforms, both of which had very basic amenities. There was a waiting shelter on each platform, as well as timetable posters. There was no step-free access between platforms, which could be accessed only by a metal footbridge.

== Passenger volume ==
In the 2014–15 period, the Office of Rail and Road recorded a total of 1,570 entries and exits. In 2015, the majority of the Teesside Steelworks closed, resulting in a drop in passenger usage of the station.

In the 2016–17 period the entries and exits dropped to fifty, making it the fourth-least-used station in Britain. In the 2017–18 period it was named the least used station in Britain, with only forty entries and exits, surpassing Barry Links.

The station saw a significant increase in passengers in the 2018–19 and 2019–20 periods, with 360 and 1,060 entries and exits respectively; the reason for the increase was thought likely to be its "least-used" status. This "least-used" status was highlighted in Geoff Marshall's video about the station.

Passenger volume at Redcar British Steel
	2004–05	2005–06	2006–07	2007–08	2008–09	2009–10	2010–11	2011–12	2012–13	2013–14	2014–15	2015–16	2016–17	2017–18	2018–19	2019–20
Entries and exits	486	920	596	[z]	[z]	1,560	954	822	890	1,418	1,570	740	50	40	360	1,060

The statistics cover twelve month periods that start in April.

== Services ==
At the time of suspension, the station was served by four trains per day. Heading east, two trains per day operated to Saltburn, which commenced at Hexham via Hartlepool (morning) and Bishop Auckland (afternoon) respectively. Heading west, two trains per day operated to Bishop Auckland, both of which commenced at Saltburn. All services were operated by Arriva Rail North.

Preceding station	National Rail	Following station
	Historical railways	
Redcar Central	Arriva Rail North; Tees Valley Line	South Bank
Redcar Central	British Rail (Eastern Region); Tees Valley Line	Grangetown
