= Tees Valley line =

Railway route in northern England

Tees Valley Line
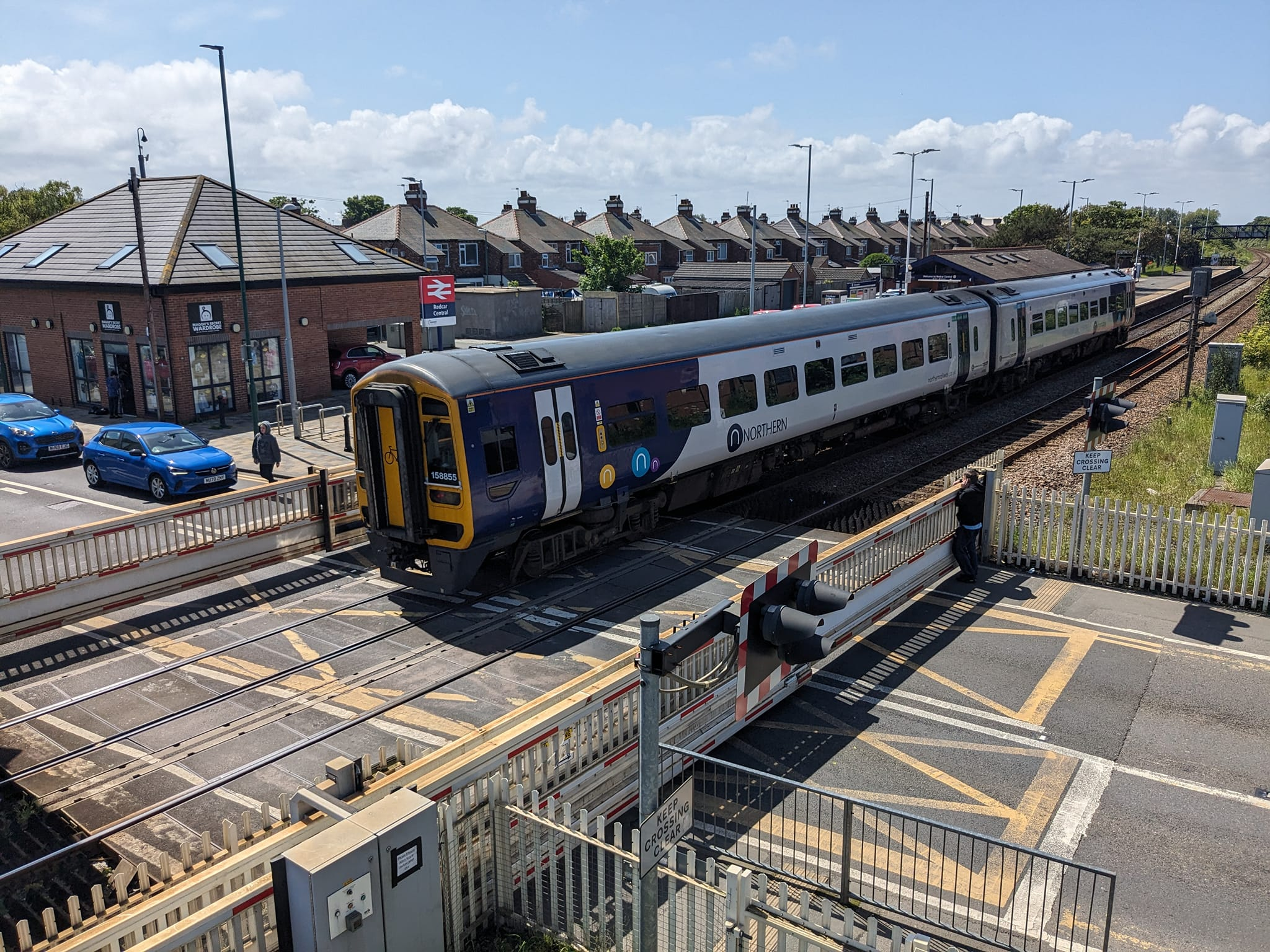
- A Northern Trains Class 158 arriving at Redcar Central Railway Station Platform One.

Overview
- Status: Operational
- Owner: Network Rail
- Locale: County Durham; North Yorkshire; Tees Valley
- Termini: Darlington; Saltburn
- Stations: 18

Service
- Type: Heavy rail
- System: National Rail
- Operators: Northern Trains; TransPennine Express; London North Eastern Railway; Grand Central
- Depot: Heaton Depot
- Rolling stock: Class 156; Class 158; Class 185; Class 800

History
- Opened: 27 September 1825

Technical
- Track length: 38 miles (61 km)
- Track gauge: 4 ft 8 1/2 in (1,435 mm) standard gauge
- Operating speed: 60 mph (97 km/h)
Route map
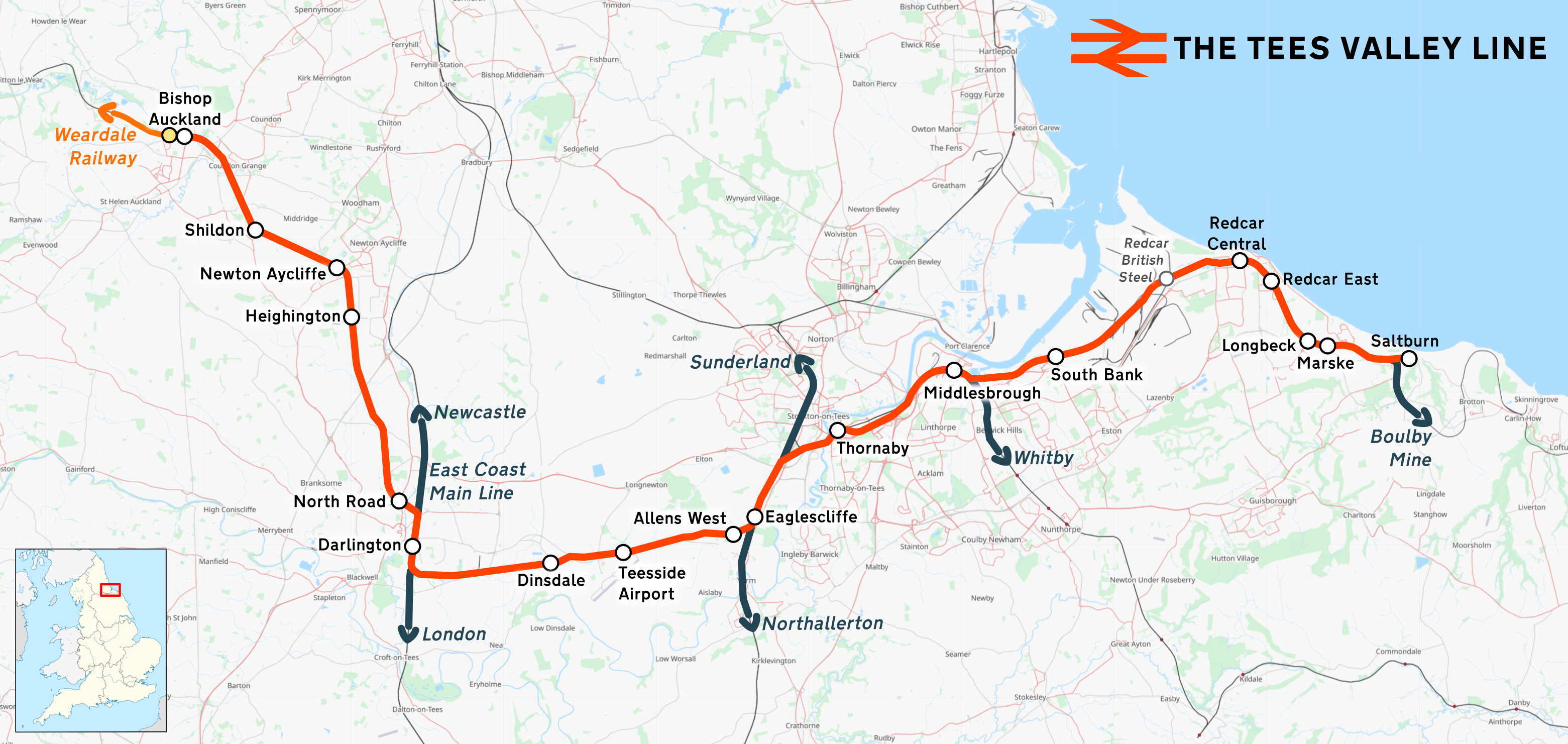
(Click to expand)

The Tees Valley Line is a railway route in Northern England, following part of the original Stockton and Darlington Railway route of 1825. The line covers a distance of 38 miles (61 km), and connects Darlington with Saltburn via Middlesbrough, Redcar Central and other stations across the Tees Valley.

The section of line beyond Darlington through to Bishop Auckland is branded as the Bishop Line and is supported by the Bishop Line Community Rail Partnership. The section of the route between Darlington and Saltburn is branded as the Tees Valley Line and is supported by the Tees Valley Line Rail User Group. Beyond the Bishop line's western terminus at Bishop Auckland, the tracks continue for around 16 miles (26 km) to Stanhope along what is now the Weardale Heritage Railway.

== History ==
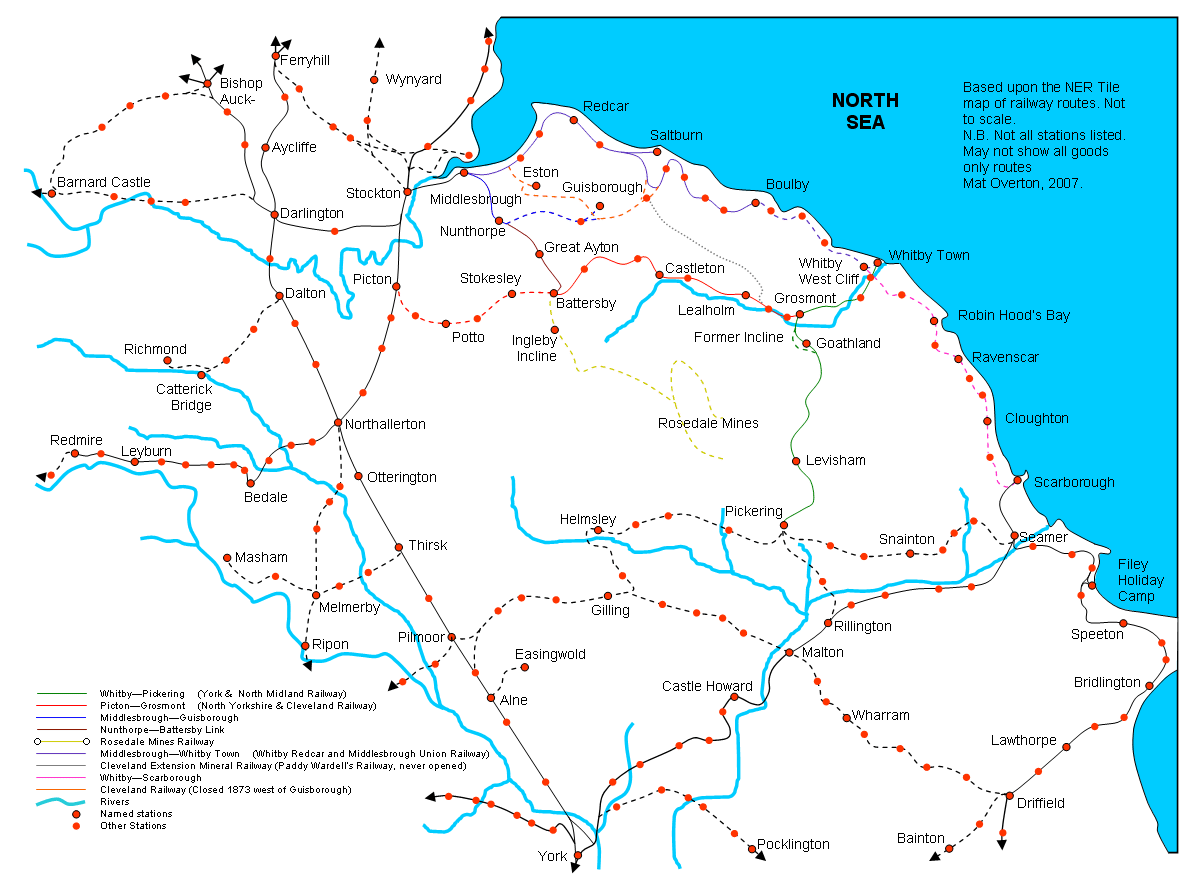
A map of the railway network of the Tees Valley, and neighbouring areas of County Durham and North Yorkshire, at its greatest extent during the early 20th century

The section of line between Bishop Auckland and Albert Hill Junction, Darlington (prior to joining the East Coast Main Line), as well as the section between Oak Tree Junction, Dinsdale (near Middleton St. George) and Eaglescliffe, follow the original route of the Stockton and Darlington Railway (S&DR), which dates back to 1825. The 1825 S&DR route is rejoined north of Eaglescliffe and runs as far as Bowesfield Junction, Stockton.

The S&DR line from Bowesfield to Watson's Wharf on the Tees near Middlesbrough opened in 1830, and this was extended to Redcar in 1846. The extension to Saltburn opened in 1861 and the line towards Brotton and Loftus opened in 1872. The line beyond Loftus (now the freight-only line to Boulby Mine) was part of the Whitby, Redcar & Middlesbrough Union Railway, opened in 1883; it closed on 5 May 1958.

In March 2015, a 0.62 miles (1 km) electrified siding was laid adjacent to the Tees Valley Line, just south of Heighington. This allows low-speed testing of the trains manufactured at the nearby Hitachi Rail plant at Newton Aycliffe, including TOPS classes 800, 801, 805, 807, 810 and 385.

== Services ==
Services on the Tees Valley Line are operated by three train operating companies:

- Northern Trains, with a half hourly service from Saltburn to Darlington, of which one train every hour extends to all stations on the Bishop Line through to Bishop Auckland. Additional services operate along the Tees Valley Line during the morning peak, with some journeys between Saltburn and Newcastle running along the East Coast Main Line, rather than the Durham Coast Line.
- TransPennine Express also operates along part of the Tees Valley Line, with hourly services from Redcar Central to Manchester Airport calling at Middlesbrough, Thornaby, Eaglescliffe, Yarm, Northallerton, York, Leeds, Manchester Victoria and Manchester Airport. Eaglescliffe was added as a call for the first time during the December 2024 timetable change. Three trains a day extend to/from Redcar Central to Saltburn.
- London North Eastern Railway operates a weekday return service from Middlesbrough to London King's Cross.

== Rolling stock ==
Predominantly, rolling stock on the Tees Valley Line consists of:

- Northern Trains operates Class 156 and Class 158 diesel multiple units (DMUs)
- TransPennine Express uses Class 185 DMUs
- London North Eastern Railway operates Class 800 bi-mode multiple units

Between 2019 and 2021, Class 156 and 158 units operating on the Tees Valley Line were refurbished, introducing free WiFi, power sockets, on-board passenger information displays and an interior refresh.

Class 185 units were refurbished as part of a £32 million investment, with the work being completed in 2018.

Class 142 Pacer DMUs formerly served the line on Northern services, until the early 2020s when they were withdrawn from passenger service.

== Stations ==
The combined Bishop/Tees Valley Line route serves the following stations:

Point	Coordinates (Links to map resources)	OS Grid Ref	Notes
Bishop Auckland	54.6572°N 1.678°W	NZ20872917	
Shildon	54.6262°N 1.6367°W	NZ23552573	
Newton Aycliffe	54.6137°N 1.5897°W	NZ26592435	
Heighington	54.5971°N 1.5818°W	NZ27112251	
North Road	54.5357°N 1.5537°W	NZ28971569	
Darlington	54.5207°N 1.5467°W	NZ29441402	
Dinsdale	54.5150°N 1.4671°W	NZ34591343	
Teesside Airport	54.5185°N 1.4253°W	NZ37301384	
Allens West	54.5246°N 1.3616°W	NZ41411455	
Eaglescliffe	54.5301°N 1.3497°W	NZ42181517	
Thornaby	54.5592°N 1.302°W	NZ45231844	
Middlesbrough	54.5791°N 1.2345°W	NZ49572070	
Cargo Fleet	54.577°N 1.2094°W	NZ51202048	Closed 1990
South Bank	54.5840°N 1.1763°W	NZ53332128	
Grangetown	54.5885°N 1.1521°W	NZ54892180	Closed 1991
Warrenby Halt	54.6156°N 1.1135°W	NZ57342485	Closed 1978
Redcar British Steel	54.6098°N 1.1126°W	NZ57412421	Suspended 2019
Redcar Central	54.6160°N 1.0703°W	NZ60132493	
Redcar East	54.6091°N 1.05193°W	NZ61332418	
Longbeck	54.5893°N 1.0310°W	NZ62712199	
Marske	54.5874°N 1.0195°W	NZ63462179	
Saltburn	54.5834°N 0.9752°W	NZ66332139	
Zetland Hotel platform	54.5837°N 0.9715°W	NZ66562143	Closed 1983

=== Least-used stations ===
In 2019, the Tees Valley Line was home to two of the country's least-used railway stations.

==== Redcar British Steel ====
In 2017-18, Redcar British Steel was the least-used station in Great Britain, with an estimated 40 passenger journeys made.

Prior to service suspension in December 2019, it was served by two trains during the morning peak and two during the evening peak.

==== Teesside Airport ====
In 2012–13 and 2013–14, Teesside Airport was the least-used station in the country, with just eight passenger journeys made in both periods.

It is currently served by a once-weekly parliamentary service; a Sunday service, commencing at Hartlepool, calls here before continuing through to Darlington.

In 2020/21, due to decreased travel throughout the COVID-19 pandemic, the station saw only two passenger journeys made. While remaining officially open, the station has seen its service suspended since May 2022, with the one operational platform condemned as unsafe. As a result, there were only 2 passengers in the year beginning April 2022.
