= South Bank railway station (England) =

Railway station in North Yorkshire, England

South Bank
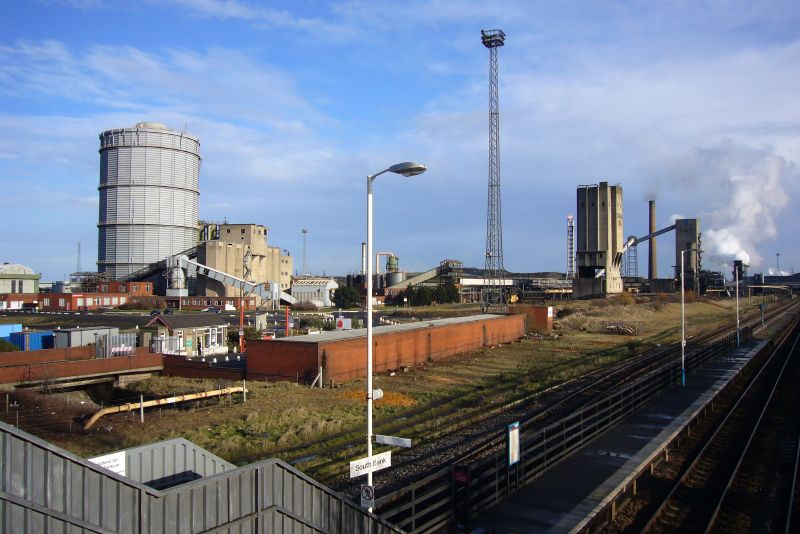

General information
- Location: South Bank, Redcar and Cleveland; England
- Coordinates: 54°35′02″N 1°10′35″W
- Grid reference: NZ532212
- Owner: Network Rail
- Manager: Northern Trains
- Platforms: 2
- Tracks: 2

Other information
- Station code: SBK
- Classification: DfT category F2

History
- Original company: North Eastern Railway
- Pre-grouping: North Eastern Railway
- Post-grouping: London and North Eastern Railway; British Rail (North Eastern Region)

Key dates
- 1 May 1882: Opened
- 23 July 1984: Resited a short distance to the west

Passengers
- 2021/22: ▲30,198
- 2022/23: ▲33,636
- 2023/24: ▲38,302
- 2024/25: ▼29,630
- 2025/26: ▼13,030
Location
Notes
- Passenger statistics from the Office of Rail and Road

South Bank railway station serves the town of South Bank, Redcar and Cleveland in North Yorkshire, England and is on the Tees Valley Line, which runs between Bishop Auckland and Saltburn via Darlington. The station is situated 2 miles 40 chains (4 km) east of Middlesbrough (17 miles 40 chains (28 km) from Darlington) and is the first station before Redcar Central. It is managed by Northern Trains, who operate all services.

== History ==
The first station, initially named Eston, was opened in 1853 by the Middlesbrough and Redcar Railway. On 1 May 1882, this was replaced by an island platform by the North Eastern Railway, to serve the growing town of South Bank. Ironically, this was located on the same site as the present station. The original station survived intact, but was derelict for many years thereafter. It has since been demolished to allow the down (eastbound) line through the site to be realigned.

In July 1984, British Rail resited the current station to the west, as the previous station was inconveniently sited in a heavily industrialised area, and in the way of a planned new dockside access road.

The closure of the earlier station was closely followed by nearby Cargo Fleet on 22 January 1990, and Grangetown on 25 November 1991.

In October 2024, part of the station was closed due to the footbridge becoming unsafe for passengers, resulting in Saltburn-bound trains (eastbound) not stopping at South Bank. Replacement buses have been laid on to accommodate passengers to and from the station. Rather than remove the footbridge, it may simply be strengthened to save money. Although due to be removed in August 2025, it is still in place as of July 2026.

=== Tees Valley Metro ===
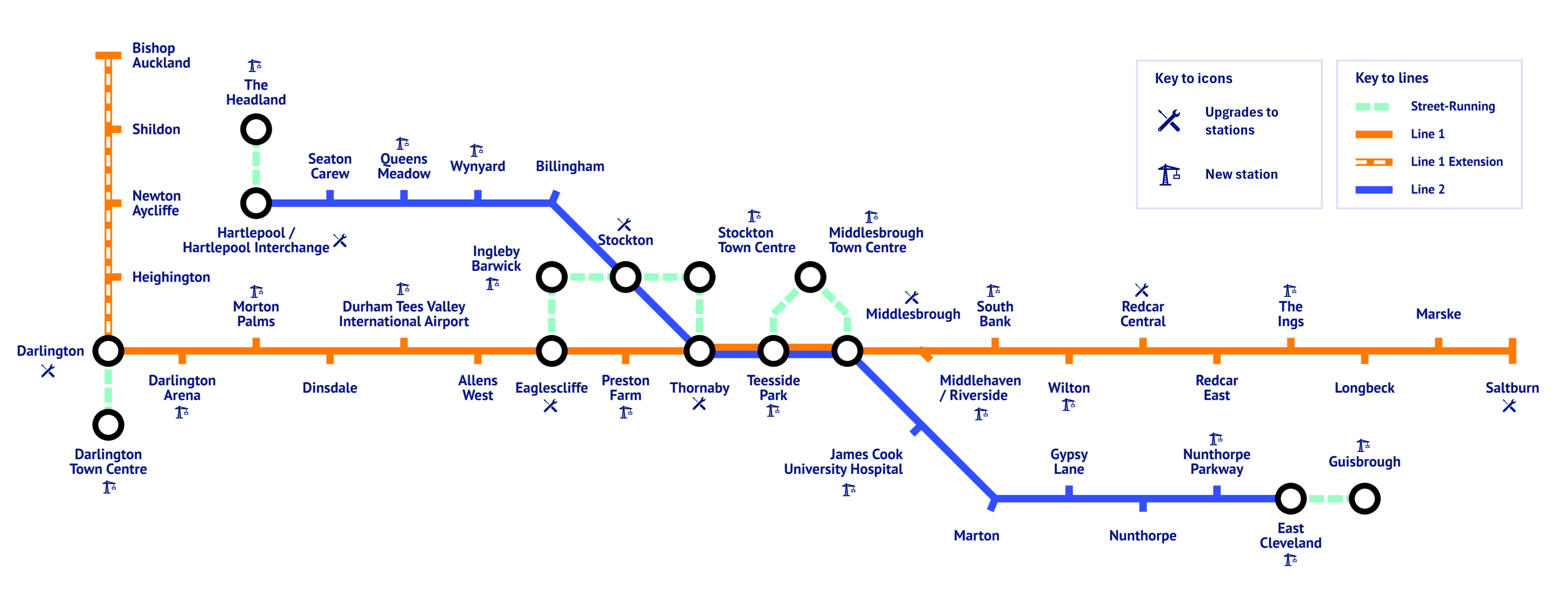
Transit diagram showcasing all discussed or mentioned ideas for the Tees Valley Metro.

Starting in 2006, South Bank was mentioned within the Tees Valley Metro scheme. This was a plan to upgrade the Tees Valley Line and sections of the Esk Valley Line and Durham Coast Line to provide a faster and more frequent service across the North East of England. In the initial phases the services would have been heavy rail mostly along existing alignments with new additional infrastructure and rolling stock. The later phase would have introduced tram-trains to allow street running and further heavy rail extensions.

As part of the scheme, South Bank station would have received improved service to Darlington (1–2 to 4 trains per hour) and new rollingstock.

However, due to a change in government in 2010 and the 2008 financial crisis, the project was ultimately shelved. Several stations eventually got their improvements and there is a possibility of improved rollingstock and services in the future which may affect South Bank.

== Facilities ==
Station facilities here been improved as part of the Tees Valley Metro project. The package for this station included new fully lit waiting shelters, renewed station signage and the installation of CCTV. The long-line Public Address system (PA) has been renewed and upgraded with pre-recorded train announcements. The station also has cycle storage facilities.

== Passenger volume ==
The station usage estimates of 2014 and 2015 also make note of the fact that the service improvement has increased the patronage substantially enough to be in the top ten most percentage increase of passenger numbers across the whole of the United Kingdom.

Passenger volume at South Bank
	2004–05	2005–06	2006–07	2007–08	2008–09	2009–10	2010–11	2011–12	2012–13	2013–14	2014–15	2015–16	2016–17	2017–18	2018–19	2019–20	2020–21	2021–22	2022–23	2023–24	2024–25
Entries and exits	1,057	1,942	1,590	1,706	1,530	1,118	2,510	2,654	4,704	12,544	22,860	21,846	23,926	21,424	23,282	27,624	11,296	30,198	33,636	38,302	29,630

The statistics cover twelve month periods that start in April.

== Services ==
As of the May 2026 timetable, the station is served by an hourly service between Saltburn and Bishop Auckland via Darlington. There were formerly 2 trains per day leaving South Bank running direct to Newcastle via Durham. All services are operated by Northern Trains.

Preceding station	National Rail	Following station
Redcar Central	Northern Trains; Tees Valley Line	Middlesbrough
	Historical railways	
Grangetown	London and North Eastern Railway; Tees Valley Line	Cargo Fleet
