= Grangetown railway station (England) =

Disused railway station in Grangetown, North Yorkshire

Grangetown
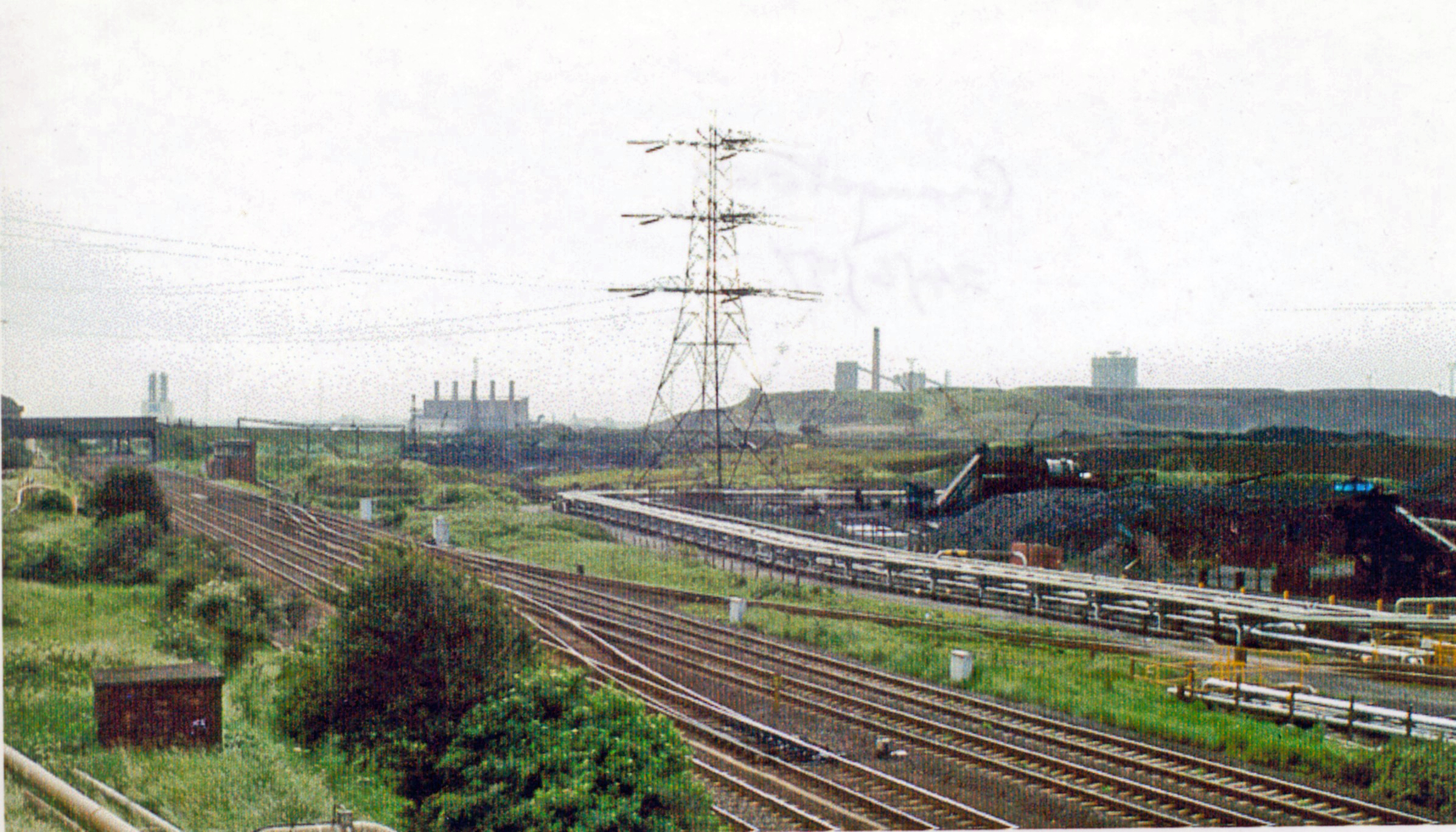
- The site of the closed Grangetown station in 1997

General information
- Location: Grangetown, Redcar and Cleveland; England
- Coordinates: 54.5885°N 1.1521°W
- Grid reference: NZ548218
- Platforms: 2

Other information
- Status: Disused

History
- Original company: North Eastern Railway
- Post-grouping: LNER; British Railways (North Eastern); British Rail (Eastern)

Key dates
- 22 November 1885: Opened as Eston Grange
- 1 January 1902: Renamed Grangetown
- 25 November 1991: Closed
Location

Grangetown railway station served the township of Grangetown in the Borough of Redcar and Cleveland, North East England between 1885 and 1991 as a stop on the Tees Valley line.

== History ==
The station opened as Eston Grange on 22 November 1885 by the North Eastern Railway. It was situated about 1 km from the current Grangetown. The station's name was changed to Grangetown on 1 January 1902. Grangetown was one of the stations to have been adversely affected due to the closure of factories, having only a few passengers left. The station was closed to passengers on 25 November 1991. Its old island platform remains intact (as of April 2024), as it used for operational purposes by Network Rail as the location of a signal relay room.

Preceding station	Historical railways	Following station
Warrenby Halt; Line and station closed	London and North Eastern Railway; Tees Valley Line	South Bank; Line and station open
Redcar British Steel; Line open, station temporarily closed	British Rail Eastern Region; Tees Valley Line	South Bank; Line and station open
