= Redcar Central railway station =

Railway station in North Yorkshire, England

Redcar Central
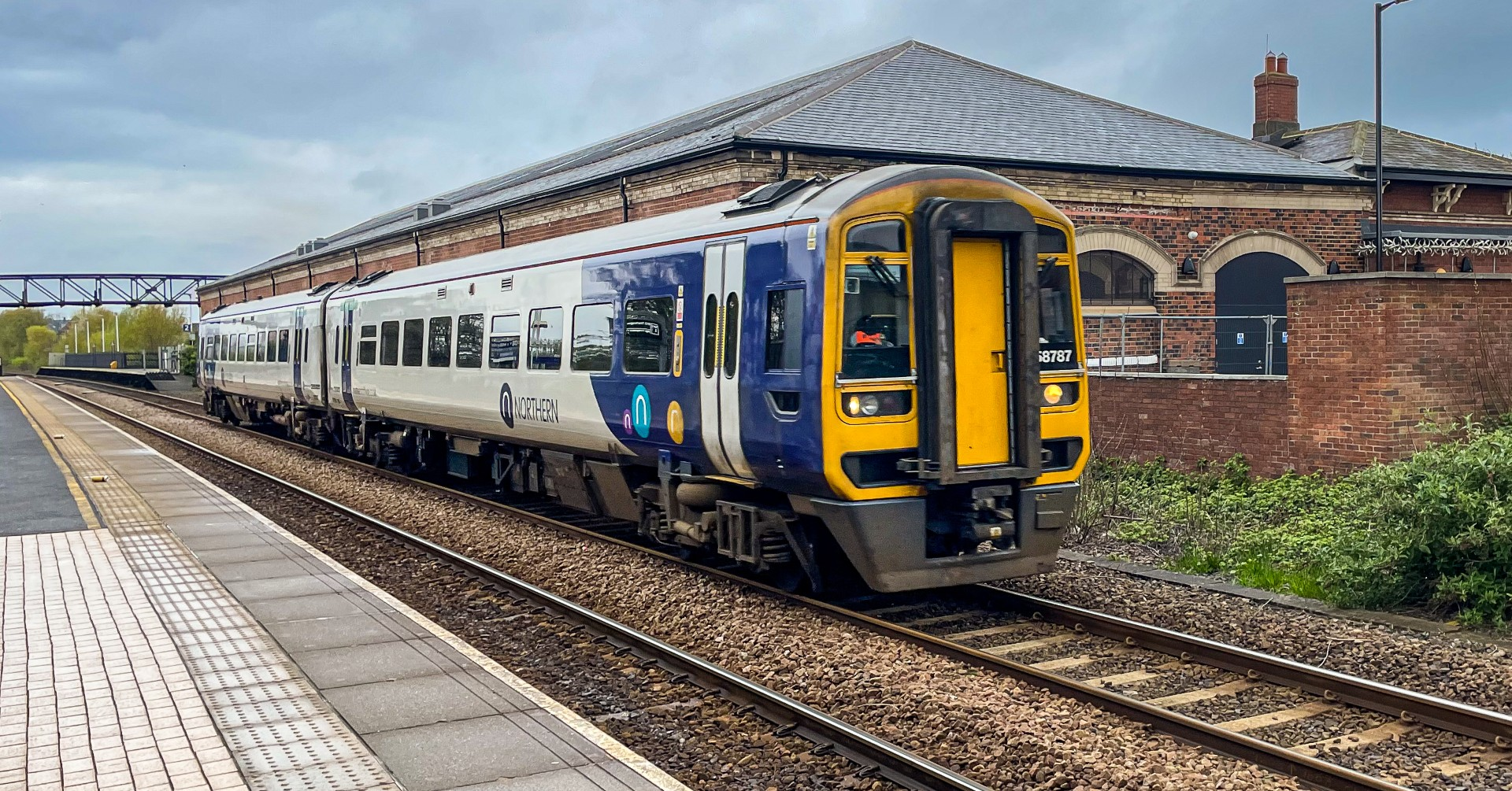
- A Northern Trains Class 158 leaving Redcar Central

General information
- Location: Redcar, Redcar and Cleveland; England
- Coordinates: 54°36′58″N 1°04′13″W
- Grid reference: NZ600249
- Owner: Network Rail
- Manager: Northern Trains
- Platforms: 2
- Tracks: 2

Other information
- Station code: RCC
- Classification: DfT category E

History
- Original company: Middlesbrough and Redcar Railway
- Pre-grouping: North Eastern Railway
- Post-grouping: London and North Eastern Railway; British Rail (North Eastern Region)

Key dates
- 5 June 1846: Opened as Redcar
- 19 August 1861: Resited
- 25 September 1950: Renamed Redcar Central

Passengers
- 2021/22: ▲0.344 million
- 2022/23: ▲0.367 million
- 2023/24: ▲0.408 million
- 2024/25: ▲0.411 million
- 2025/26: ▲0.416 million
Location
- Location within North Yorkshire
Notes
- Passenger statistics from the Office of Rail and Road

Redcar Central is a railway station on the Tees Valley Line, which runs between Bishop Auckland and Saltburn via Darlington. The station, situated 7 miles 64 chains (12.6 km) east of Middlesbrough, serves the seaside town of Redcar, Redcar and Cleveland in North Yorkshire, England. It is owned by Network Rail and managed by Northern Trains.

== History ==
The line into the town from the west was opened as the Middlesbrough and Redcar Railway on 5 June 1846. The company that constructed it was nominally independent but, in reality, was backed financially by the Stockton and Darlington Railway and the Great North of England Railway, one of the constituent companies of the North Eastern Railway.

The Stockton and Darlington Railway had formally taken over by the time an extension eastwards to Saltburn was completed in August 1861. The route diverged from the original line just short of the existing terminus, part of which remained in use for goods traffic, and a new through station had to be constructed. This was built in a similar style to that used by G.T. Andrews elsewhere on the North Eastern Railway, with an impressive frontage and overall roof.

Initially, the station had only a single platform, which led to congestion issues and delays during the summer months, when traffic levels were at their heaviest. A second platform outside the train shed was eventually provided for westbound services by the London and North Eastern Railway in 1935. Today, the original train shed is no longer used, with a replacement eastbound platform having been constructed alongside it at the end of the 1980s.

The level crossing utilised motorised wooden boom gates that swung across the road for many years. Still, these later became increasingly unreliable and prone to failure in high winds. In 2015, Network Rail replaced these with telescopic metal gates — a design unique to this particular location until 2026. Similar gates have now been installed at Nunthorpe on the Esk Valley line.

=== Tees Valley Metro ===
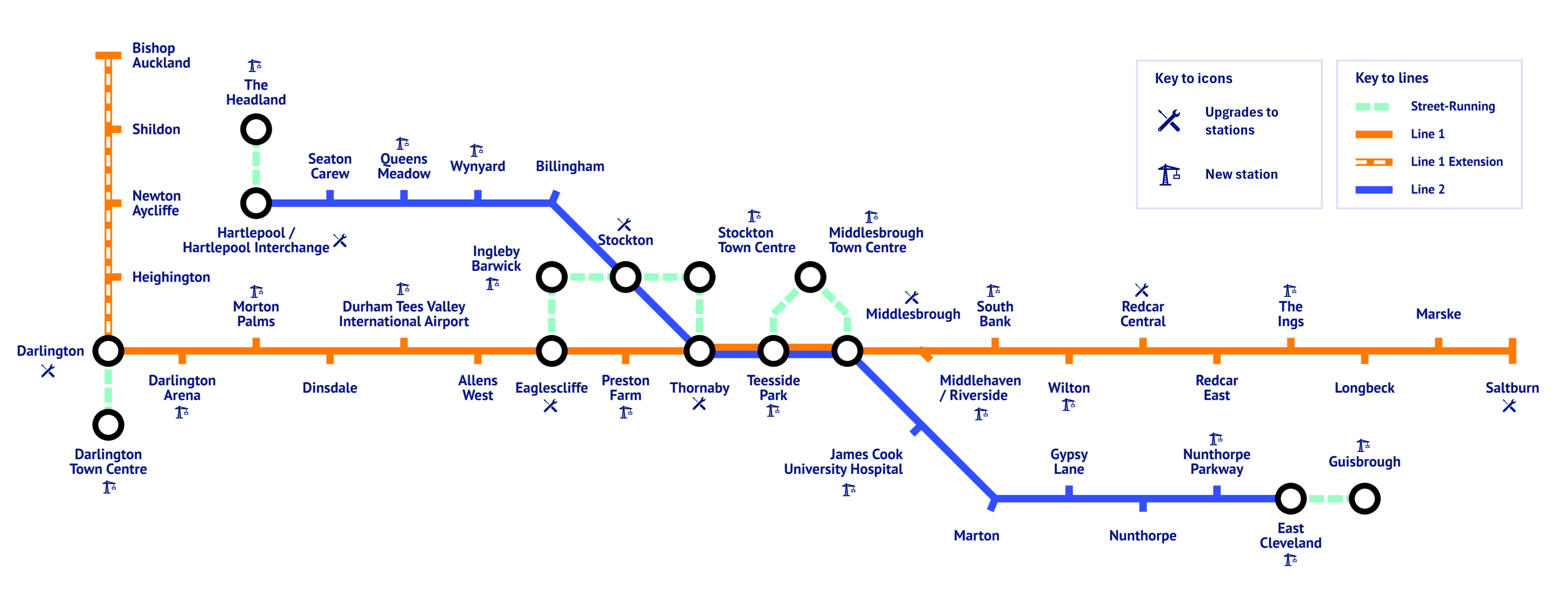
Transit diagram showcasing all discussed or mentioned ideas for the Tees Valley Metro.

Starting in 2006, Redcar was mentioned within the Tees Valley Metro scheme. This was a plan to upgrade the Tees Valley Line and sections of the Esk Valley Line and Durham Coast Line to provide a faster and more frequent service across the North East of England. In the initial phases, the services would have been heavy rail mostly along existing alignments with new additional infrastructure and rollingstock. The later phase would have introduced tram-trains to allow street running and further heavy rail extensions.

As part of the scheme, Redcar station would have received improved service to Darlington (1–2 to 4 trains per hour) and new rollingstock. Upgrades were also considered for the existing footbridge, waiting shelters and passenger information facilities. There would also be three new pedestrian links – one each to the new civic quarter, to the town centre and new seafront and to Redcar & Cleveland College, as well as a new bus/rail interchange and pick-up/drop-off facilities (occurred after cancellation).

However, due to a change in government in 2010 and the 2008 financial crisis, the project was ultimately shelved. Several stations eventually got their improvements and there is a possibility of improved rollingstock and services in the future which may affect Redcar.

== Facilities ==
Redcar Central has a staffed ticket office, open Monday to Saturday (07:50–14:45) but not on Sunday. A self-service ticket machine is available for use outside these hours or for collecting pre-paid tickets. There is also a waiting room that is open Monday to Saturday - these are both on the southern side (platform 1). Platform 2 has a shelter, timetable, poster boards and bench seating.

Platform 1 is further west than platform 2, and a bridge over the track connects the two. There is a level crossing over one of the major roads into Redcar at the end of platform 1, which can also be used to cross over the track. Nearby is the Redcar Station business park, which is housed in the old trainshed, closed since 2016, and now in disrepair. Platform 2 has a turnback facility for terminating trains from the west, which is used mainly by TPE services, but it can also be used by Northern in the event of service disruption or planned engineering work.

Station facilities here were improved in 2013. The package for this station included improved platform lighting, renewed station signage, digital information screens and the installation of CCTV. The long-line Public Address system (PA) has been renewed and upgraded with pre-recorded train announcements. Step-free access is available to both sides.

== Services ==
=== Northern Trains ===
As of October 2025, the station is served by two trains per hour between Saltburn and Darlington via Middlesbrough, with one train per hour extending to Bishop Auckland. An hourly service operates between Saltburn and Bishop Auckland on Sunday.

=== TransPennine Express ===
As of September 2025, TransPennine Express operate 1 train per hour to Manchester Airport via York with all services running via Yarm. Two evening services extend to Saltburn with the first early morning departure also starting back from there.

With the exception of services extended to and from Saltburn, all TransPennine Express services depart from Platform 2.

| Preceding station | National Rail | Following station |
|---|---|---|
| Redcar East | Northern Trains; Tees Valley line | South Bank |
| Saltburn | TransPennine Express; North TransPennine | Middlesbrough |
| Terminus | TransPennine Express; North TransPennine | Middlesbrough |
| | Historical railways | |
| Redcar East | British Rail (Eastern Region); Tees Valley line | Redcar British Steel |
| Redcar East | London and North Eastern Railway; Tees Valley line | Warrenby Halt |

== Sources ==
- Body, Geoffrey (1989). Railways of the Eastern Region. Wellingborough, Northamptonshire, England: P. Stephens. ISBN 1-85260-072-1.
