= Middlesbrough railway station =

Railway station in North Yorkshire, England

Middlesbrough
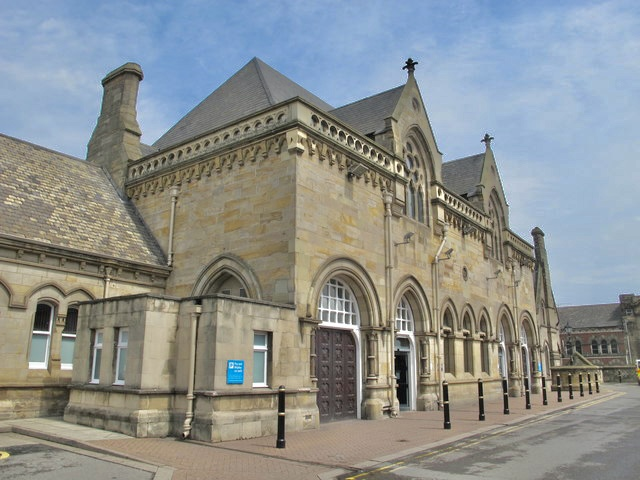
- The station in 2013

General information
- Location: Middlesbrough, Borough of Middlesbrough, England
- Coordinates: 54°34′45″N 1°14′04″W
- Grid reference: NZ495207
- Owner: Network Rail
- Manager: TransPennine Express
- Platforms: 2
- Tracks: 2

Other information
- Station code: MBR
- Classification: DfT category C1

History
- Original company: Stockton and Darlington Railway
- Pre-grouping: North Eastern Railway
- Post-grouping: London and North Eastern Railway, British Rail (North Eastern Region)

Key dates
- December 1830: Opened (Note: The first station was a timber-built shed, constructed by the Stockton and Darlington Railway.)
- 1839: Resited (second) (Note: The second station was located on Commercial Street.)
- 26 July 1847: Resited (third)
- 16 December 1874: Closed (third)
- December 1877: Resited and reopened (fourth)
- 3 August 1942: Station extensively damaged in World War II air raid

Passengers
- 2020/21: ▼0.343 million
- 2021/22: ▲1.211 million
- Interchange: 53,435
- 2022/23: ▲1.376 million
- Interchange: ▼48,167
- 2023/24: ▲1.467 million
- Interchange: ▲65,298
- 2024/25: ▲1.543 million
- Interchange: ▲86,879
Location
- Location within North Yorkshire
Notes
- Passenger statistics from the Office of Rail and Road

Middlesbrough railway station serves the town of Middlesbrough, in North Yorkshire, England. It lies on the Durham Coast, Esk Valley and Tees Valley lines. It is owned by Network Rail and managed by TransPennine Express. Direct destinations include Darlington, Redcar Central, Saltburn, Sunderland, Newcastle, York and Manchester Airport; there is also direct service to London Kings Cross once per weekday.

According to the Office of Rail and Road statistics, Middlesbrough station is the fourth busiest in the North East region, with 1,466,884 total entries and exits in the 2023–24 period.

== History ==
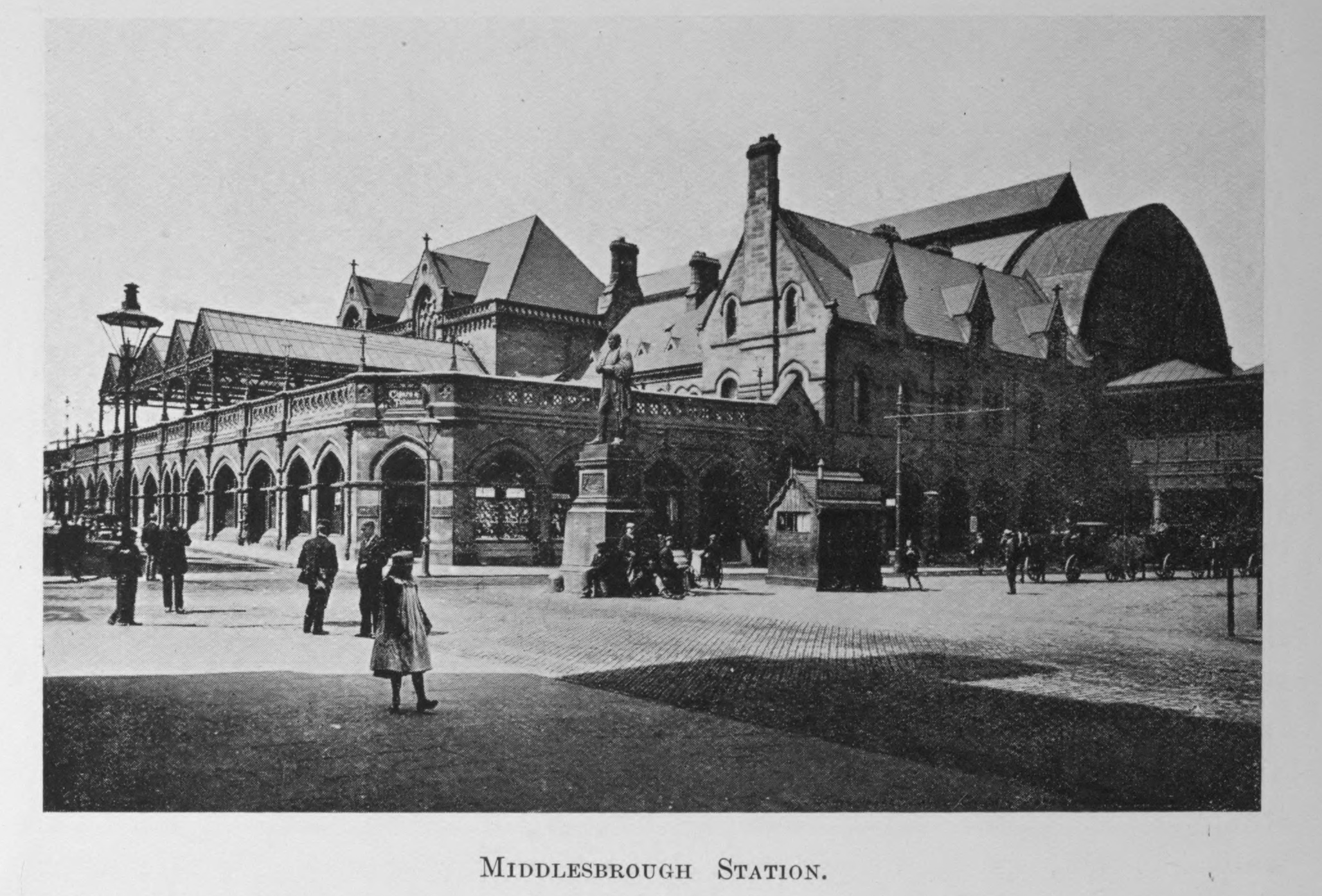
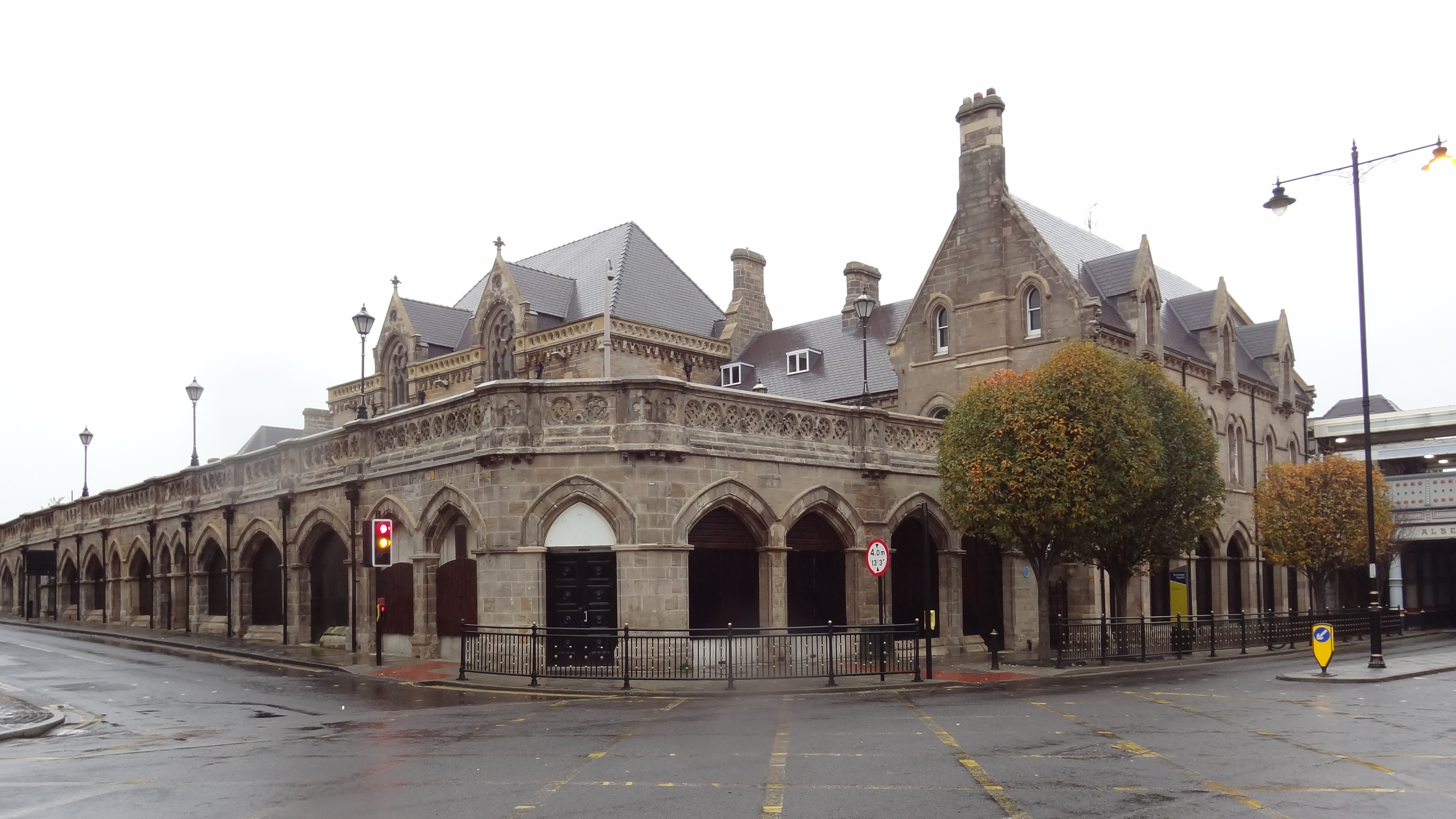
The station, as seen at the turn of the 20th century (left) and in the 2010s (right).

The first railway line was opened in the area in December 1830, as an extension of the Stockton and Darlington Railway (SD&R) to connect with the port of the (then new) town of Middlesbrough. From the opening of the line until 1837, passengers were served by a wooden shed on the route to the riverside coal staithes. The line was extended to the new exchange along Commercial Street in 1837, with a new station being constructed two years later. This more substantial station was opened by the S&DR in 1839.

In June 1846, a branch line extending eastwards from the Stockton and Darlington Railway towards Redcar was opened by the Middlesbrough and Redcar Railway. Situated on the Redcar branch line on the southern edge of the new town, a new passenger station was designed by John Middleton, which opened on 26 July 1847.

As the town expanded rapidly southwards during the second half of the 19th century, the station was unable to cope with the increased traffic. Due to the design of the station not lending itself to expansion, it was subsequently demolished in 1874. It was replaced by the current, much larger station, which opened in December 1877. The Commercial Street station, which was increasingly isolated from the town by the opening of the Redcar branch line, became a goods station before eventually being demolished.

The current station was designed by the North Eastern Railway's chief architect, William Peachey, with an ornate Gothic style frontage. Behind this, an overall roof of elliptical design once existed. It was constructed using wrought iron of lattice design, with glass covering the middle half and timber (inside) and slate (outside) covering the outer quarters. The two end screens were glazed with timber cladding around the outer edges. The roof was high in relation to its width.

The elliptical roof was severely damaged in a German daylight air raid, which took place on the afternoon of 3 August 1942. It was eventually removed in 1954, to be replaced by the current design over the concourse and platforms.

A major refurbishment of the station took place during 2017 and 2018, with repairs carried out to the station's roof and stonework, as well as the upgrading of the Wood Street car park. New information screens were also installed as part of the refurbishment.

As part of a major upgrade to the station, platform 2 was extended in the first half of 2021, allowing for a new direct service from Middlesbrough to London King's Cross. On 13 December 2021, a London North Eastern Railway (LNER) Class 800 Azuma departed from the station at 07:08, the first direct service to the capital since 1988.

=== Tees Valley Metro ===
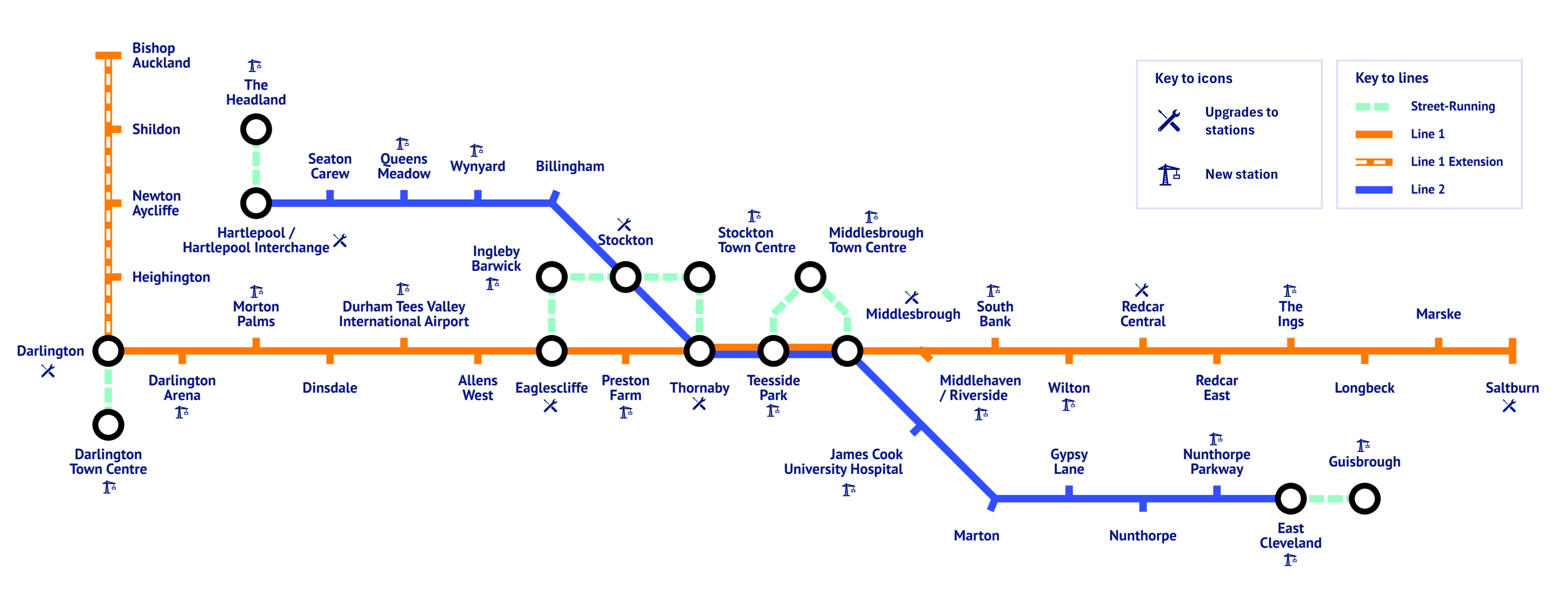
Transit diagram showcasing all discussed or mentioned ideas for the Tees Valley Metro

Starting in 2006, Middlesbrough was mentioned within the Tees Valley Metro scheme. This was a plan to upgrade the Tees Valley Line, and sections of the Esk Valley Line and Durham Coast Line, to provide a faster and more frequent service across the North East of England. In the initial phases, the services would have been heavy rail mostly along existing alignments with new additional infrastructure and rolling stock. The later phase would have introduced tram-trains to allow street running and further heavy rail extensions.

As part of the scheme, Middlesbrough station would have received improved service to Darlington and Saltburn (from one/two up to four trains per hour), as well as Nunthorpe and Hartlepool, and new rolling stock. There was also the talk of new platforms at Middlesbrough, and a new entrance to the north of the station creating access points for the Boho and Middlehaven developments. The plan also suggested new street-running trams going into Middlesbrough town centre, but no concrete plans were ever submitted; the line from Nunthorpe to Hartlepool may have been extended to include street-running to Guisborough and the Headland.

However, due to the 2008 financial crisis and a change in government in 2010, the project was ultimately shelved. Several stations eventually got their suggested improvements after the scheme was cancelled and there is a possibility of improved rolling stock and services in the future which may affect Middlesbrough.

== Facilities ==
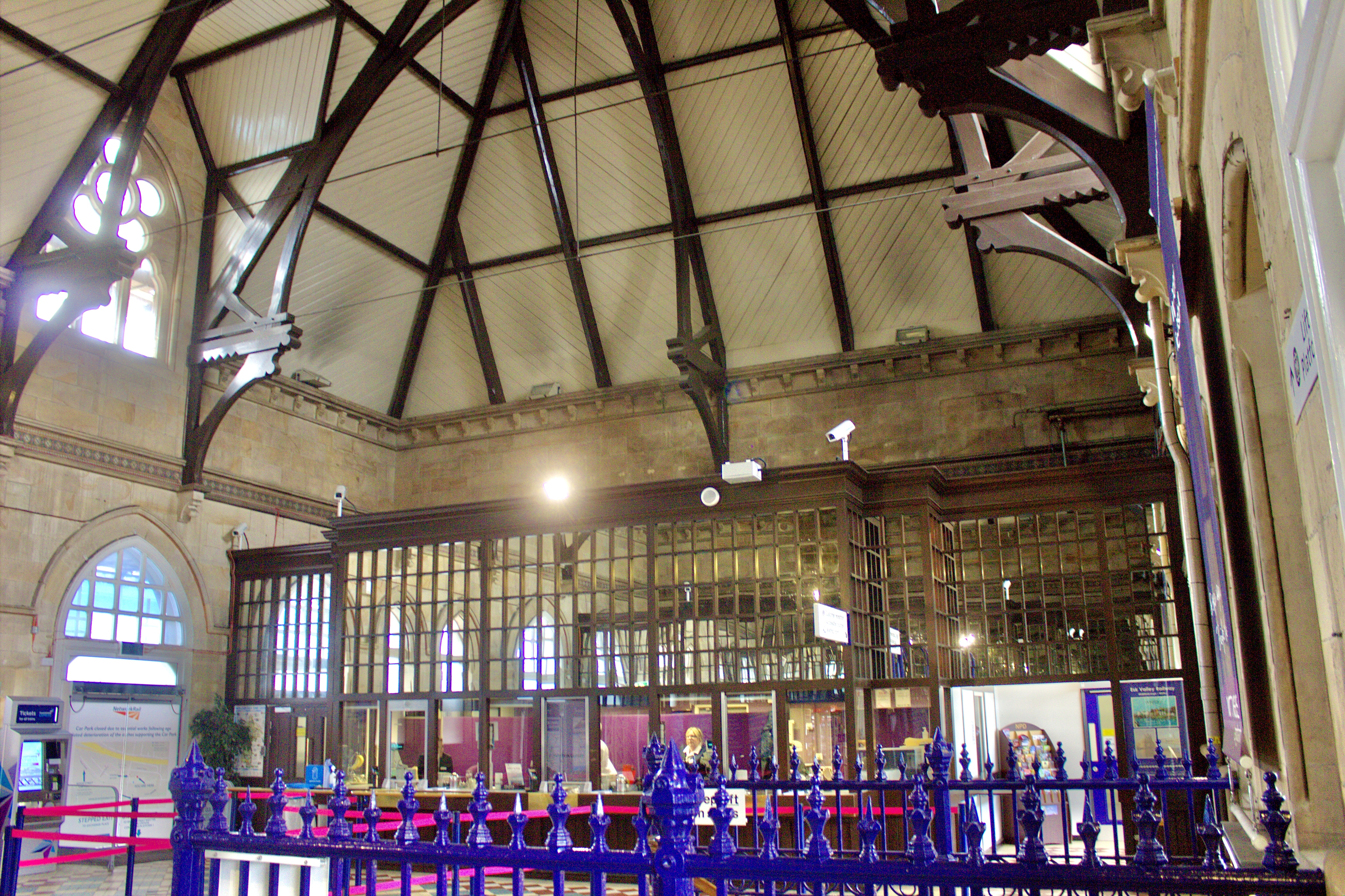
The ticket offices

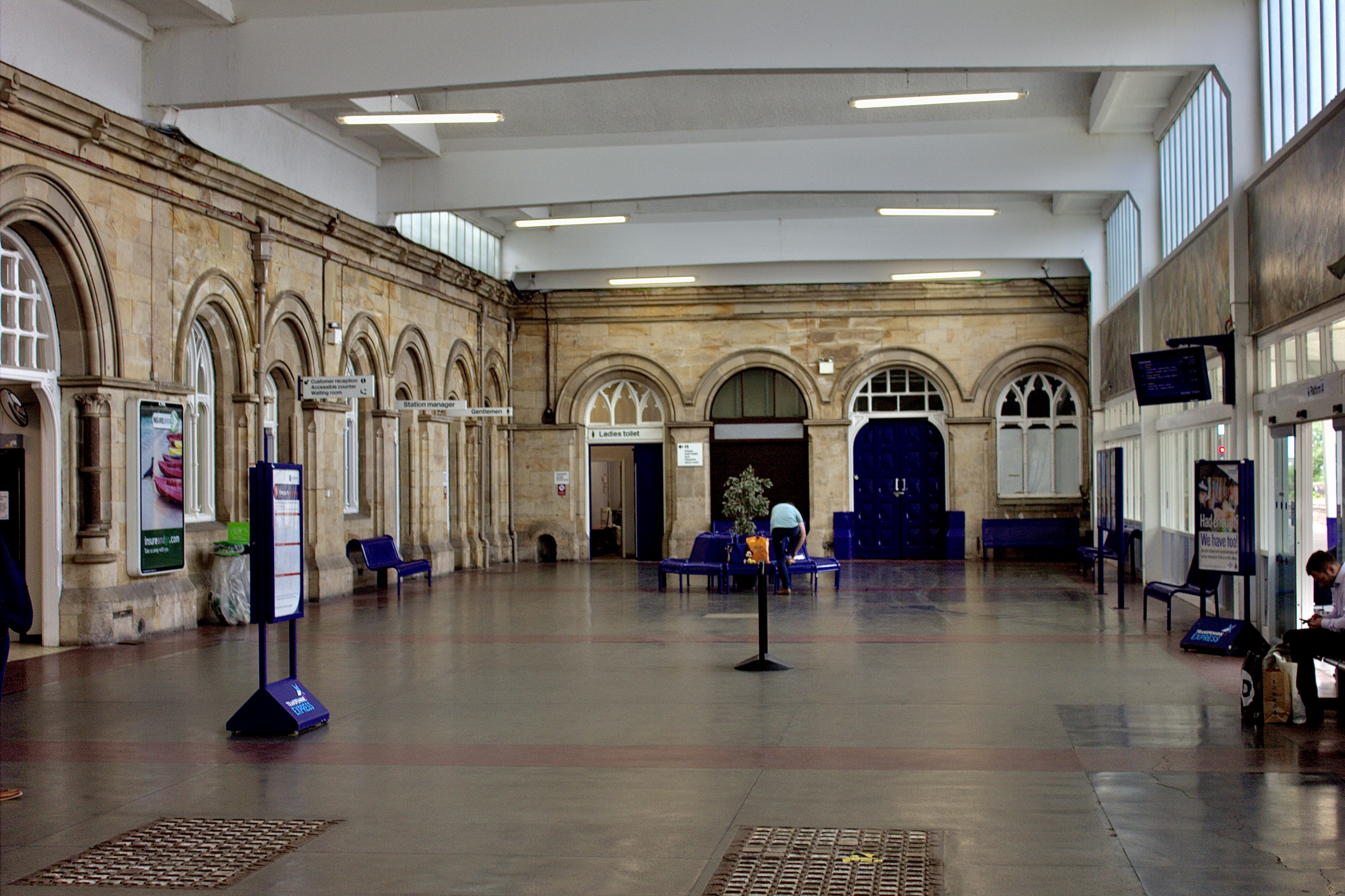
The waiting room

The main station layout consists of an entrance hall, with ticket office, large concourse/waiting area and two covered platforms that are each subdivided into two sections (a and b); two freight lines by-pass to the north of the station.

The station is staffed and has a range of facilities including a cafe/bar, newsagent, bicycle storage, toilets and lifts. A number of information screens throughout the station provide information on train arrivals and departures. Car parking, with 134 spaces, is situated to the east of the station and can be accessed via Exchange Square and Wood Street, and by footpath directly to the station. A drop-off point is located at the front of the station, close to the main entrance.

=== Redevelopment ===
As of April 2026, the station is currently undergoing a major £125 million multi-year redevelopment programme to improve the overall layout of the station. Phase 1 has been completed and included existing station platforms being extended and infrastructure upgraded to introduce a daily weekday LNER service to London.

Phase 2 currently in progress, has seen further improvements to the station including the existing undercroft and associated new units being completely rebuilt, existing staircases repositioned and a new station entrance built. Completion of phase 2 is expected by the end of 2026.

Phase 3 of the station will see a new platform 3 and additional track infrastructure built on the northern side of the station, increasing capacity to accommodate more trains. Phase 3 of the redevelopment is now estimated to cost £90 million (as of December 2025) and will be funded by money secured from the scrapping of the HS2 Northern leg and is now scheduled to be completed in 2028.

== Services ==
The station is served by three train operating companies; they provide the following general off-peak services in trains per hour/day (tph/tpd):

=== Northern Trains ===
==== Durham Coast Line ====
- 1 tph to Carlisle, via Stockton, Hartlepool, Sunderland, Newcastle and Hexham (limited stop)
- 1 tph to Newcastle, via Hartlepool and Sunderland (stopping service).

==== Esk Valley Line ====
- 1 tph to Nunthorpe; of which:
  - 2 tpd continue to Great Ayton
  - 6 tpd continue to Whitby, via Battersby.

==== Tees Valley Line ====
- 2 tph to Saltburn
- 2 tph to Darlington; of which:
  - 1 tph extends to Bishop Auckland
  - 2 tpd extend to Newcastle via Durham.

=== TransPennine Express ===
- 1 tph to Redcar Central; of which:
  - 2 tpd extend to Saltburn
- 1 tph to Manchester Airport, via York, Leeds and Manchester Piccadilly.

=== London North Eastern Railway ===
- 1 tpd to London King's Cross, calling at Thornaby, York, Doncaster, Retford and Peterborough.

Preceding station	National Rail	Following station
Thornaby	TransPennine Express; North TransPennine	Redcar Central
Thornaby	London North Eastern Railway; East Coast Main Line	Terminus
Thornaby	Northern Trains; Durham Coast Line	Terminus
Thornaby	Northern Trains; Tees Valley line	South Bank
Terminus	Northern Trains; Esk Valley line	James Cook
	Historical railways	
Terminus	London and North Eastern Railway; Middlesbrough and Guisborough Railway	Ormesby
Newport; Line open, station closed	North Eastern Railway	Terminus

== Gallery ==
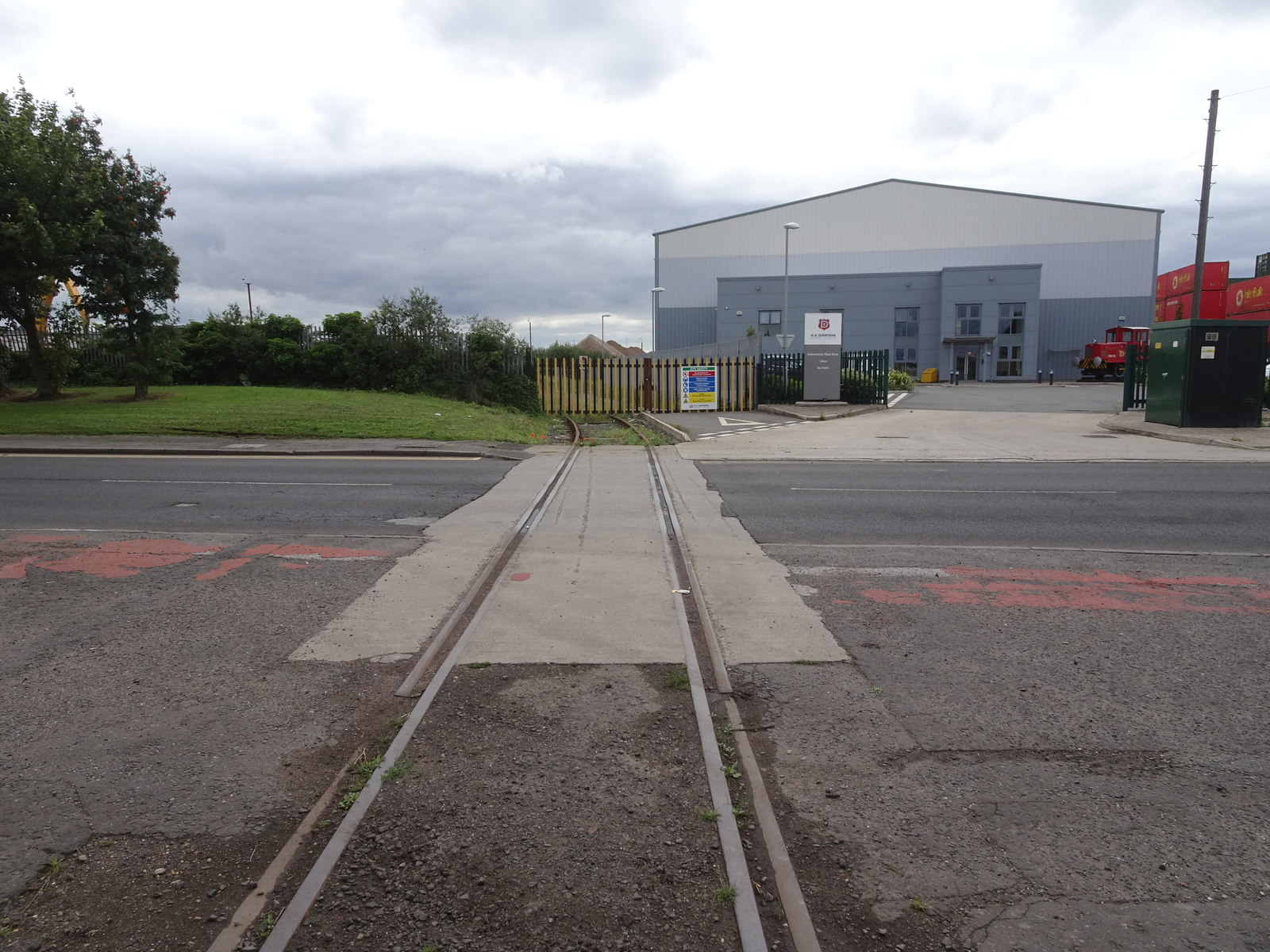
The site of the timber-built first station, opened in 1830 by the Stockton & Darlington Railway; it is now an industrial estate

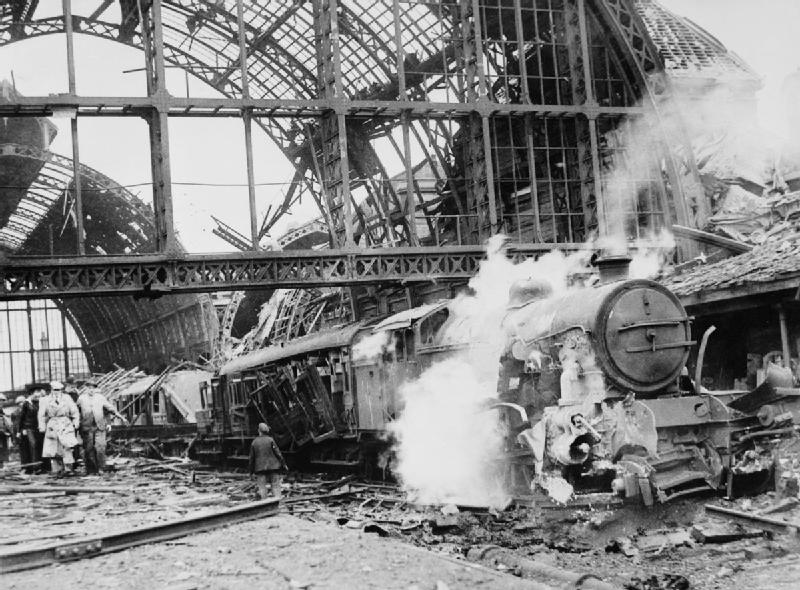
The station after a German air raid (3 August 1942)

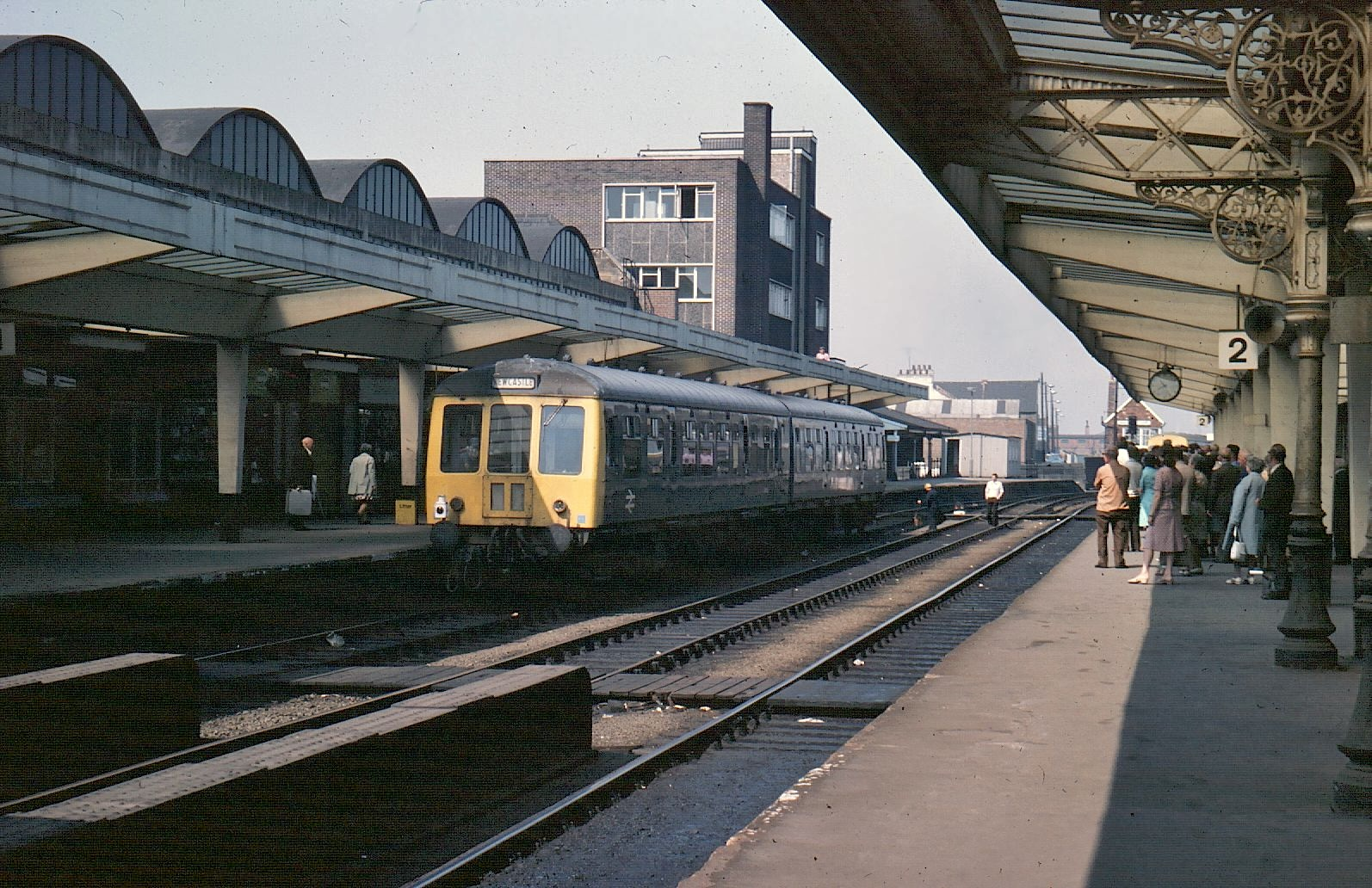
The station, looking west towards Thornaby (July 1977)

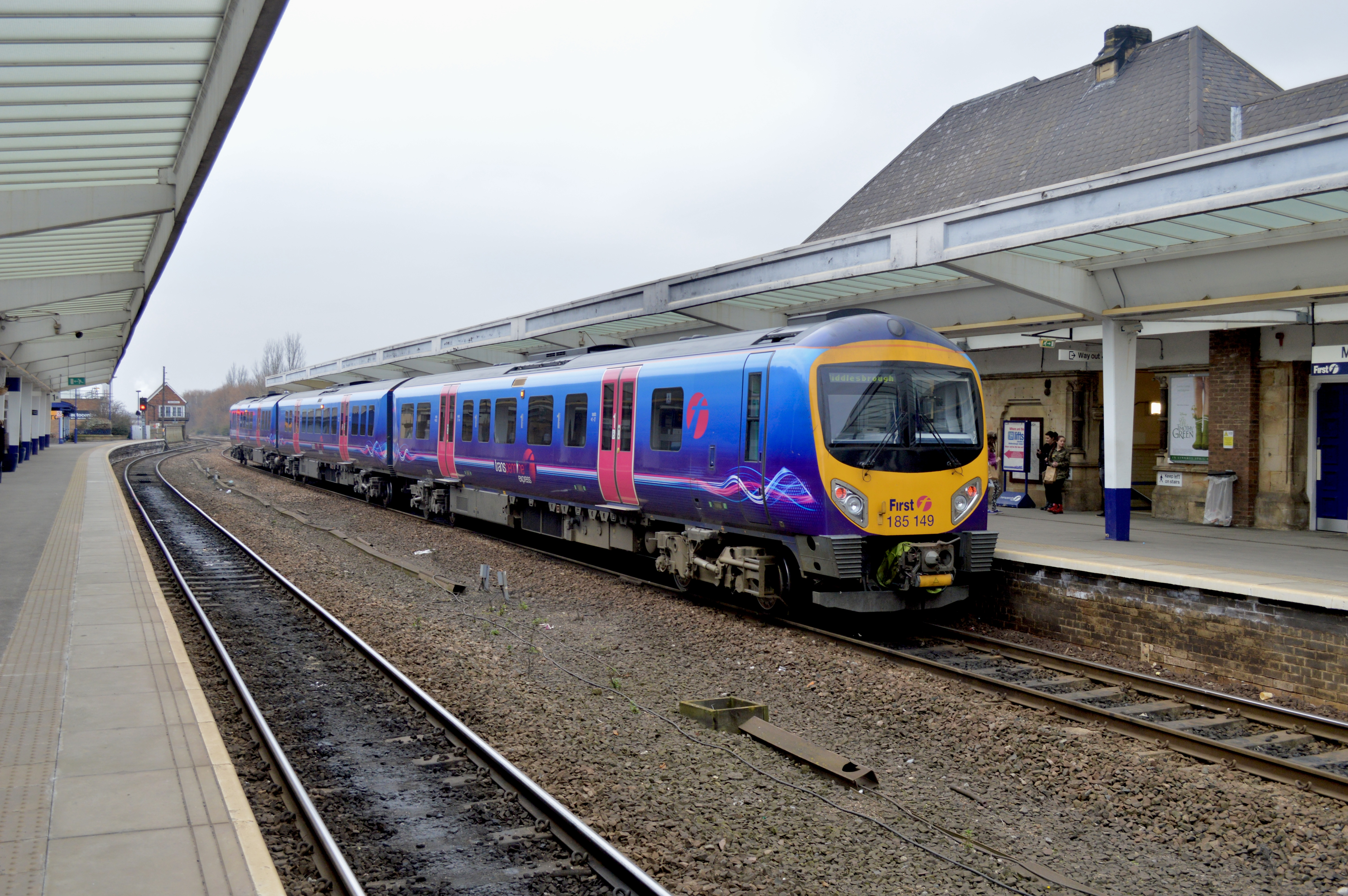
A Class 185 Desiro at platform 2 (April 2013).
