= Zetland Hotel =

Hotel in Saltburn, North Yorkshire, England

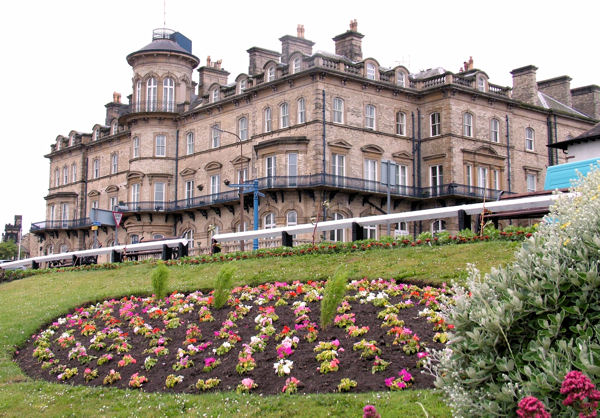
The Zetland Hotel, now converted to flats

The Zetland Hotel is located on the north east coast of England at Saltburn-by-the-Sea, North Yorkshire. It was designed by William Peachey, architect to the Stockton and Darlington Railway. The seaside resort of Saltburn was developed by Henry Pease who was a director of the Stockton and Darlington Railway. It is a Grade II listed building.

With the discovery of ironstone in the local hills ironstone mining became a lucrative industry. In order to transport the raw materials and final products of this industry the Stockton and Darlington Railway Company was formed and both Henry and Joseph Pease were on the board of trustees.

Henry Pease realised that the area above the hamlet of Saltburn had great potential as a resort for the moneyed and titled as well as providing goods and services and homes for mineworkers. The Saltburn Improvement Company laid down a number of stipulations relating to public buildings had to be faced with white firebricks purchased from the Pease West Brickworks in County Durham. The railway was extended to Saltburn not only to bring trade and business to the area but to collect ironstone from the local mines.

It is said that he built the town from scratch after having an apparition of a heavenly city above the cliffs. However Pease was a pragmatic man and there were harder economic reasons for developing this stretch of the Cleveland coast. The Zetland Hotel was said to be the jewel in his crown. Henry Pease and his family owned a house at 5 Britannia Terrace, close to the hotel but its location cannot be accurately determined due to the re-numbering of the Terrace after an envisaged development (The Assembly Rooms) failed to materialise on the corner of Britannia Terrace and Milton Street.

On 2 October 1861 the foundations were laid for the hotel by Lord Zetland. The specification included that white fire bricks had to be used with Westmorland slate on the roof. A glass canopy from the station platform to the rear entrance of the hotel had to be constructed to protect the guests from the elements. The Zetland Hotel was one of the world's earliest purpose-built railway hotels with its own private platform (the first was built in Derby). The hotel was opened, again by Lord Zetland on 27 July 1863.

Early tariffs indicate that room rates ranged from 2s 6d for a regular bedroom to 4s 6d for an extra large bedroom.

In addition the hotel boasted lawn tennis courts facing Dundas Street. Also featured were hot and cold sea and fresh water baths. The hotel proved to be extremely popular and in 1876 magistrates granted an extension of opening hours from 10.00 pm to 11.00 pm to encourage trade. Alcoholic drinks, however, were still not allowed for consumption on the open terraces. In 1882, John Richardson was fined 5/- for drinking a glass of beer outside the hotel. The manager of the hotel, Mr Verini, was also fined 5/- for supplying him.

From a visitor’s handbook of 1863, the Zetland Hotel was described as

... in the Italian Style... of firebricks... The front and sides have spacious terraces, with perforated balustrades of terra-cotta, surmounted with vases of flowers: and a neat balcony runs along the whole front of the middle storey. A semi-circular tower rises in the centre of the front, which is used as a telescope room, and is provided with another balcony; and both from the top of this tower and the balcony the view is gorgeous. The hotel contains about 90 rooms, comprising about 50 bedrooms, a large dining and coffee room, a ladies' coffee and drawing room, reading room, smoking room, billiard room etc.

— George Tweddell, Saltburn by the Sea

In 1937 the LNER decided to modernise the hotel with the provision of hot and cold water in all visitor bedrooms, and by installing additional bathrooms. The existing dining rooms were converted into a lounge and reading room, which also doubled as a ball room. A new dining room was built and a cocktail bar.

The hotel was closed from 1940 for the duration of the war, and was re-opened by the Hotel Executive British Transport on 3 October 1949.

In 1951 the British Transport Commission put the hotel up for sale, but in the auction in 11 October, there were no bidders.

However, by the early 1970s the number of visitors to the town had dropped substantially. Many hotels struggled to survive and had to close. Eventually, the Zetland Hotel also closed in 1983 and was converted into apartments in 1989. The station platform, canopy and railway buffer, however, can still be seen. The building is now known simply as 'The Zetland'.
