= Saltburn railway station =

Railway station in North Yorkshire, England

Saltburn
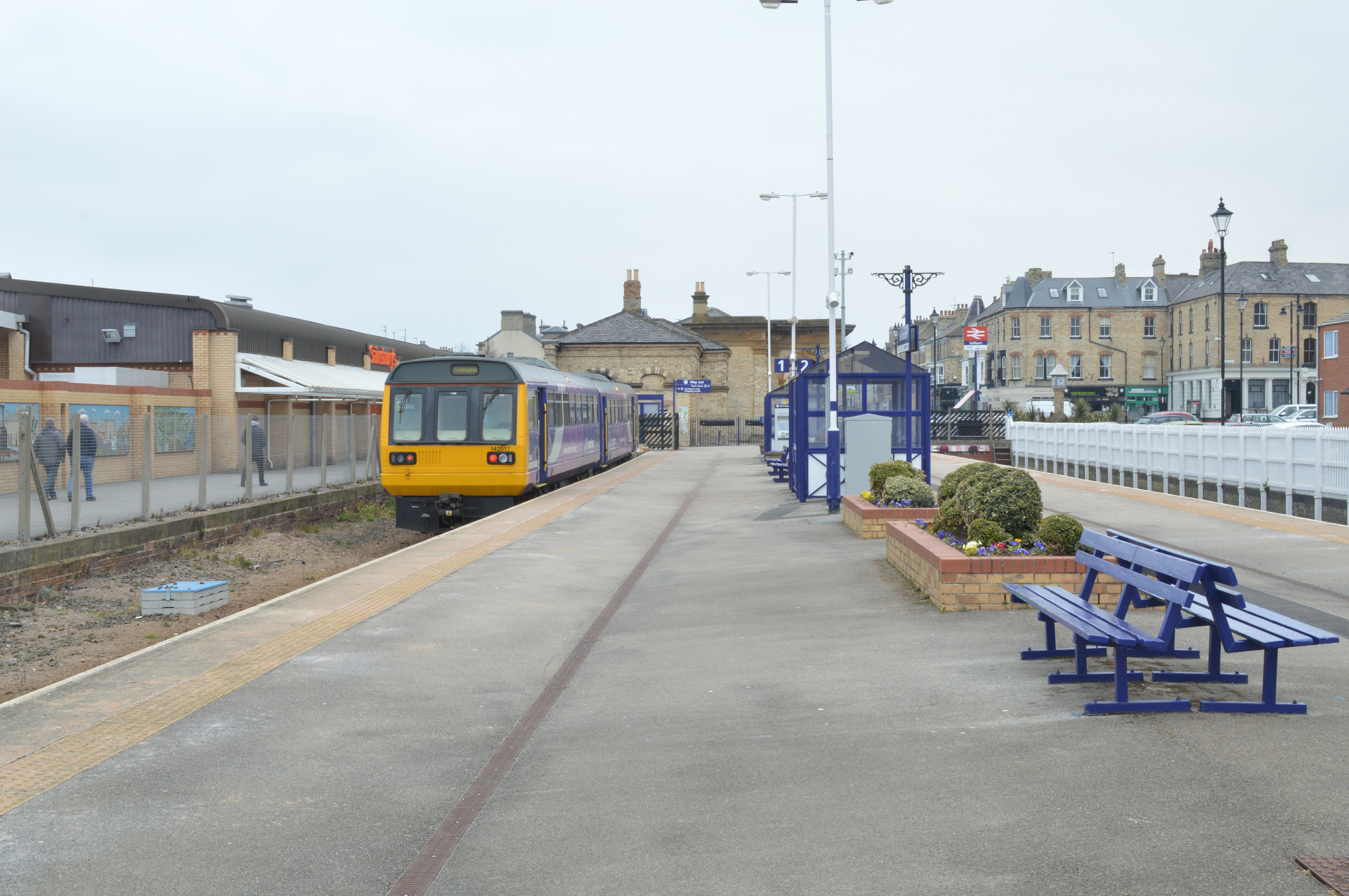

General information
- Location: Saltburn-by-the-Sea, Redcar and Cleveland, England
- Coordinates: 54°35′00″N 0°58′31″W
- Grid reference: NZ664214
- Owner: Network Rail
- Manager: Northern Trains
- Platforms: 2
- Tracks: 2

Other information
- Station code: SLB
- Classification: DfT category F1

History
- Original company: North Eastern Railway
- Pre-grouping: North Eastern Railway
- Post-grouping: London and North Eastern Railway, British Rail (North Eastern Region)

Key dates
- 19 August 1861: Opened

Passengers
- 2021/22: ▲0.202 million
- 2022/23: ▲0.249 million
- 2023/24: ▲0.319 million
- 2024/25: ▲0.356 million
- 2025/26: ▲0.359 million
Location
- Location within North Yorkshire
Notes
- Passenger statistics from the Office of Rail and Road

Saltburn is a railway station on the Tees Valley Line, which runs between Bishop Auckland and Saltburn, via Darlington. The station, situated 12 miles 57 chains (20.5 km) east of Middlesbrough, serves the seaside town of Saltburn-by-the-Sea, in North Yorkshire, England. It is owned by Network Rail and managed by Northern Trains.

== History ==
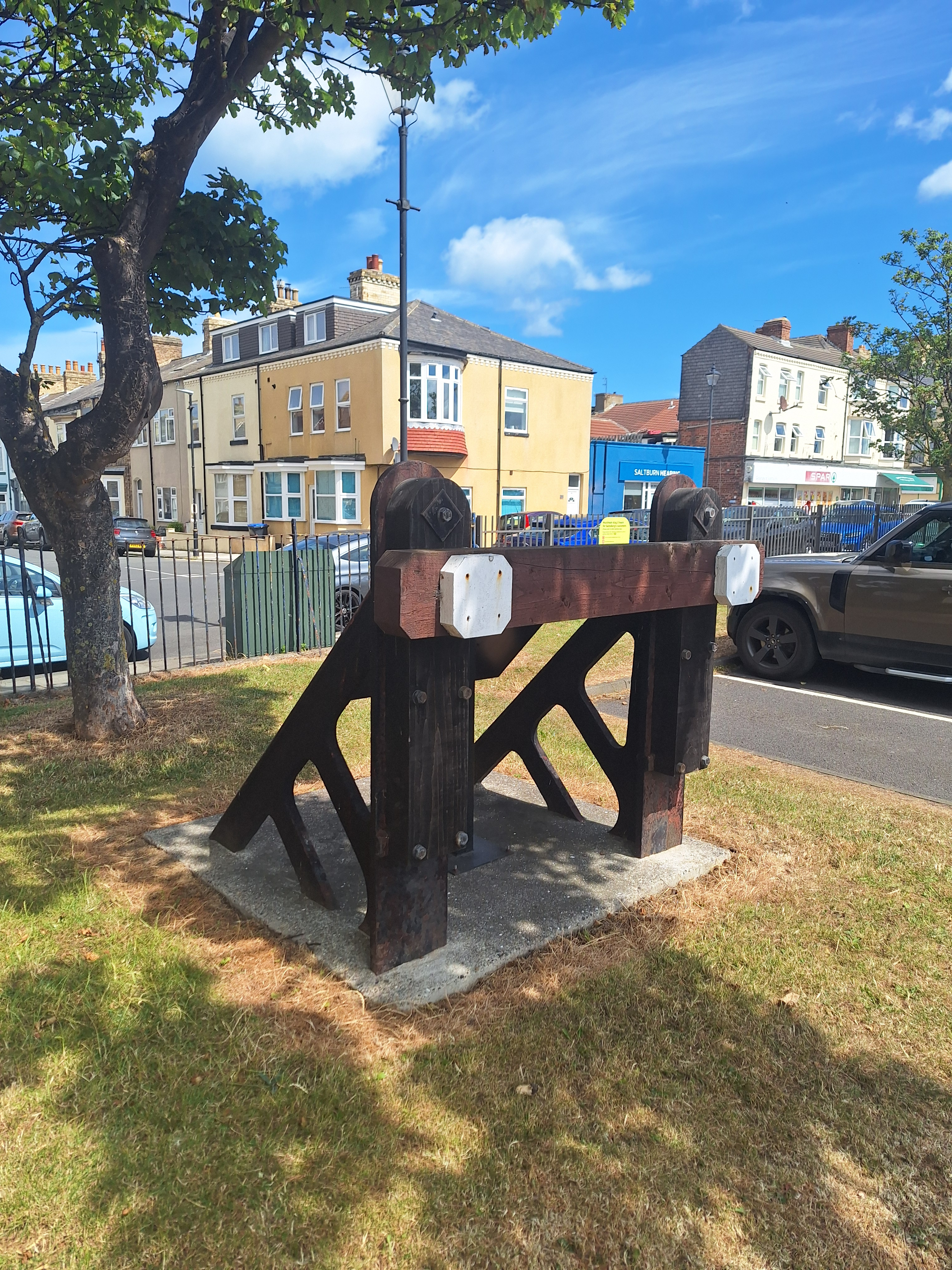
Buffers used as a heritage marker

The station was opened by the Stockton and Darlington Railway as the terminus of their line from Redcar on 17 August 1861; although the ornate station building was not finished until the following year. Eleven years later, the North Eastern Railway opened a line towards Brotton (the Whitby Redcar and Middlesbrough Union Railway) from the town, but this diverged from the original route some 440 yards (400 m) west of the 1861 station in order to avoid excessively steep gradients further east. This meant that passenger trains from the town to Loftus and Whitby that started in 1875 had to reverse into and out of the terminus before regaining the correct direction at Saltburn West Junction. This line is still in operation today to serve the Skinningrove Steelworks and the Boulby potash mine, although passenger trains ceased in 1958.

In its heyday, the station had four platforms and a sizeable number of carriage sidings to handle the large quantities of excursion trains that ran there; these included services from as far away as Leeds and Blackpool. There was also a short siding extension (approximately 300 yards (270 m)) from the main station to another platform at the rear of the railway-owned Zetland Hotel (opened in 1863), where passengers in first class carriages could disembark directly into their accommodation.

A 1974 remodelling scheme saw the station reduced in size with the two main platforms and signal box being taken out of use along with most of the sidings and one of the two running lines from West Junction. Today, both of the two surviving excursion bay platforms are used for scheduled services, but neither the main station building nor the Zetland Hotel is in rail-related use. The former having been converted into a photographic studio, cafe and various other retail outlets and the latter into luxury flats.

A buffer stop from the siding formerly on the south side of the station has been re-erected in a car park on the north side of the station to commemorate Saltburn's railway heritage. An accompanying display sign describes the history of the station, with a map and old photographs.

=== Tees Valley Metro ===
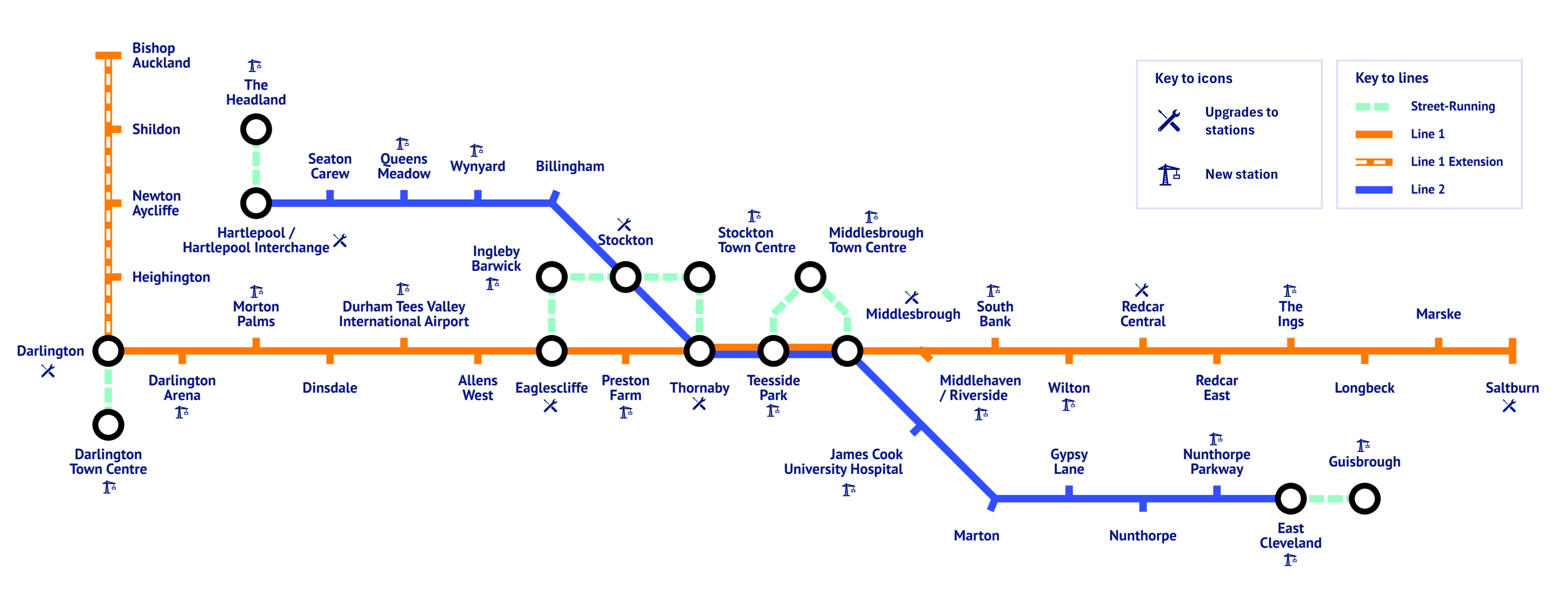
Transit diagram showcasing all discussed or mentioned ideas for the Tees Valley Metro

Starting in 2006, Saltburn was mentioned within the Tees Valley Metro scheme. This was a plan to upgrade the Tees Valley Line, with sections of the Esk Valley Line and Durham Coast Line to provide a faster and more frequent service across the North East of England.

As part of the scheme, Saltburn station would have received new shelters and new electronic information displays, as well as improved service to Darlington (one/two to four trains per hour).

However, due to a change in government in 2010 and the 2008 financial crisis, the project was ultimately shelved. Several stations eventually got their improvements including Saltburn in 2012, and there is a possibility of improved rolling stock and services in the future which may affect Saltburn.

== Facilities ==
The station is unstaffed; it has two acrylic glass passenger shelters, bench seating and an electronic information board. A self-service ticket machine is available. Step-free access is provided from the main entrance to both platforms.

Station facilities here were improved in summer 2012. The package for this station included new waiting shelters, decorative planting schemes, renewed station signage, a digital information screen displaying live departures, and the installation of CCTV. The long-line Public Address system (PA) has been renewed and upgraded with pre-recorded train announcements.

== Services ==
The station is served by two train operating companies; they provide the following general off-peak services in trains per hour/day (tph/tpd):

Northern Trains

- 2 tph to Darlington, via Middlesbrough; of which:
  - 1 tph continues to Bishop Auckland
- 1 tpd to Newcastle, via Darlington and Durham.

On Sundays, there is 1 tph to Bishop Auckland.

TransPennine Express

- 1 tpd to Manchester Airport
- 2 tpd to York.

On Saturdays, there is 1 tpd to Manchester Airport and 1 tpd to York.

Preceding station	National Rail	Following station
Terminus	Northern Trains Tees Valley Line	Marske
Terminus	TransPennine Express North TransPennine	Redcar Central
	Disused railways	
Terminus; Line open, station open	North Eastern Railway	North Skelton; Line open, station closed

This station offers access to the Cleveland Way
Distance to path	
Next station anticlockwise	Kildale 8 miles
Next station clockwise	Whitby 19 miles
