= Sexhow railway station =

Disused railway station in North Yorkshire, England

Sexhow
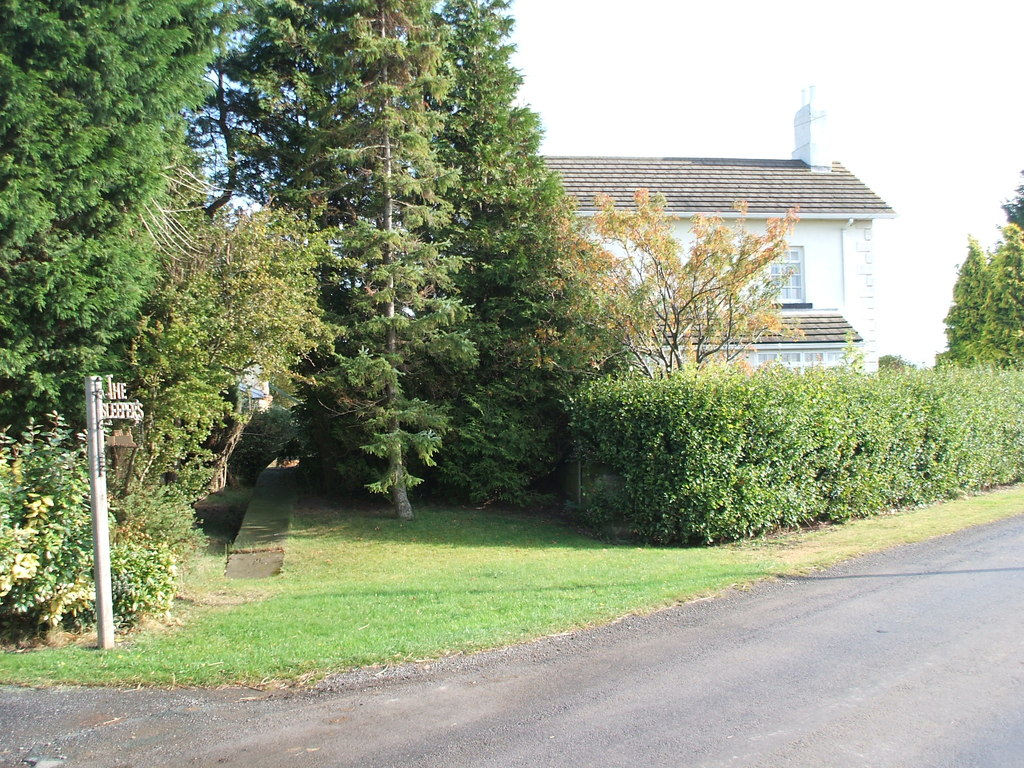
- The site of the station in 2009

General information
- Location: Sexhow, North Yorkshire; England
- Coordinates: 54.4404°N 1.2468°W
- Grid reference: NZ439050
- Platforms: 2

Other information
- Status: Disused

History
- Original company: North Yorkshire and Cleveland Railway
- Pre-grouping: North Eastern Railway
- Post-grouping: London and North Eastern Railway

Key dates
- April 1857: Station opened
- 14 June 1954: Closed to passengers
- 1 December 1958: Closed completely
Location

Sexhow railway station was a railway station built to serve the hamlet of Sexhow in North Yorkshire, England. The station was on the North Yorkshire and Cleveland's railway line between Picton and Stokesley, which opened in 1857. The line was extended progressively until it met the Whitby & Pickering Railway at Grosmont. Sexhow station was closed in 1954 to passengers and four years later to goods. The station was located 13 miles (21 km) south of Stockton, and 3 3/4 miles (6.0 km) west of Battersby railway station.

== History ==
The station was opened in April 1857, when the line from Picton was opened up as far as Stokesley. Mapping shows the station to have had three sidings in the goods yard, coal drops and a crane. The main station buildings were on the westbound (Picton direction) side of the station. The station was south of the village that it served, and was actually in the parish of Carlton in Cleveland, which has led to speculation that it was named Sexhow to avoid confusion with Redmarshall railway station, which was originally named Carlton.

Bradshaw's timetable of 1877 shows five out and back workings between Stockton railway station and Whitby, with connections advertised in Middlesbrough. The timetable of 1906 shows that the station had six services eastbound from Stockton railway station towards Stokesley, with five going all the way to Whitby and one terminating at Battersby railway station. Return services were just five a day with four coming from Whitby. The other service from Whitby reversed at Battersby and went to Stockton via Middlesbrough railway station. By 1946, eight years before closure, the service was down to just three stopping services each way per day, with most of the services from Whitby to Stockton reversing at Battersby and going via Middlesbrough.

The station closed to passengers in June 1954, and then closed completely in December 1958, having been used for goods traffic.

Preceding station	Disused railways	Following station
Potto; Line and station closed	NER; Picton-Battersby Line	Stokesley; Line and station closed
