= Northallerton Town railway station =

Disused railway station in North Yorkshire, England

Northallerton Town
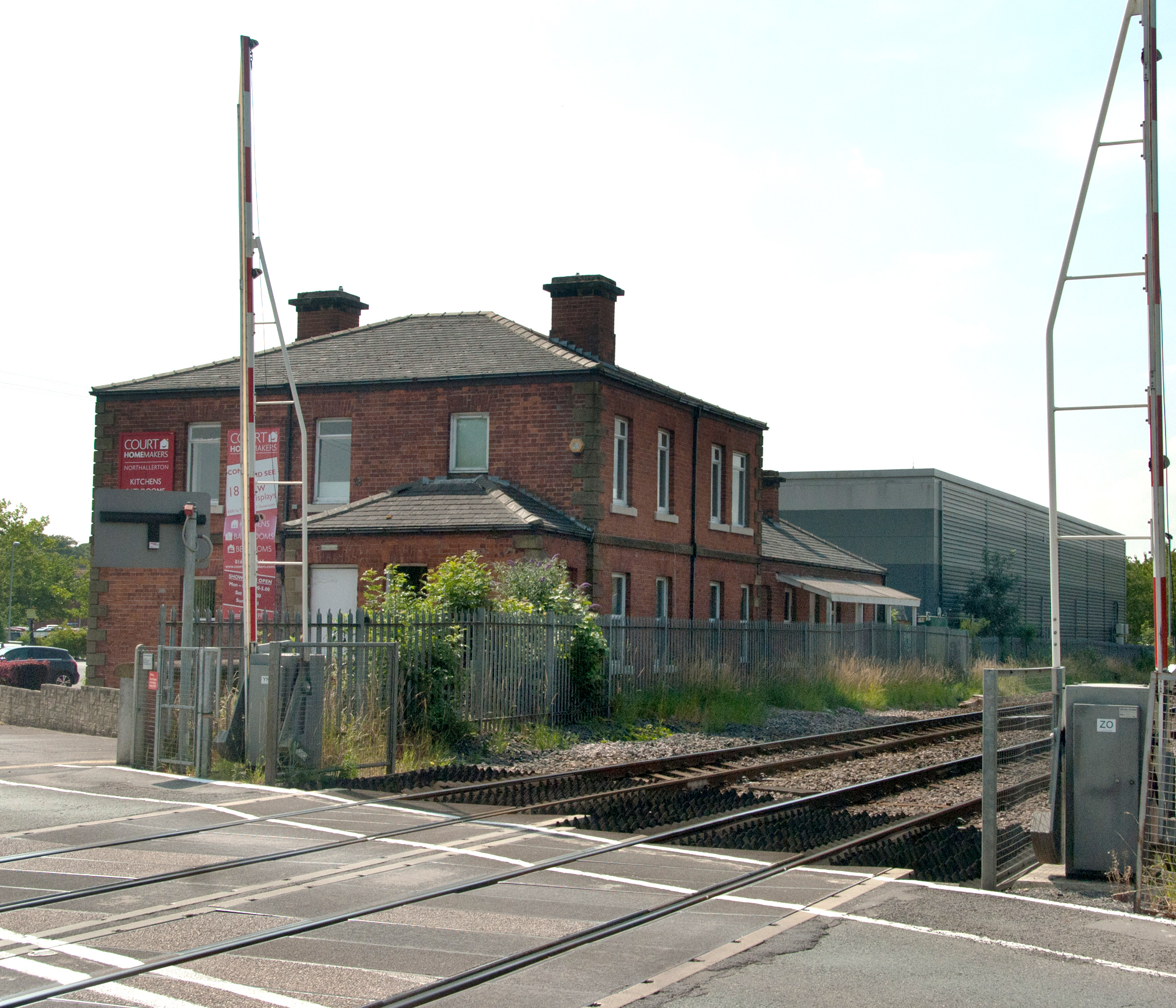
- Northallerton Town station building

General information
- Location: Northallerton, North Yorkshire; England
- Coordinates: 54.345387°N 1.439517°W
- Grid reference: SE365945

Other information
- Status: Disused

History
- Pre-grouping: Leeds Northern Railway
- Post-grouping: North Eastern Railway

Key dates
- 2 June 1852: Station opened
- 1 January 1856: Station closed
Location

Northallerton Town railway station was a railway station on the Leeds Northern Railway just north-east of the present day Northallerton railway station. The station was open for only four years before an amalgamation of railway companies, and the re-routing of the trains through Northallerton station, precipitated its closure.

== History ==
The first railway to reach Northallerton was the York, Newcastle and Berwick Railway (YN&B) in 1841. The YN&B opened a railway station on that line, which is still in the same location today and is the only mainline station in Northallerton. The Leeds Northern Railway (LNR) extended their line from what would become Melmerby Junction to Stockton via Northallerton, which opened in June 1852 with Northallerton Town opening on the same day as the line. The two lines ran parallel to each other but at different levels, with the YN&B running on an embankment to the east of the LNR. The LNR line was routed under the YN&B just north of Northallerton station with the LNR station located on the north-eastern edge of town where the Low Gates level crossing still is.

In 1854, new platforms on the LNR were opened adjacent to Northallerton Station linked by a path which were called Northallerton Low. In July of the same year, the two companies (and one other, the York & North Midland) amalgamated to form the North Eastern Railway and in January 1856, a new spur was opened between the Leeds Northern Line and the high level Northallerton station, making Northallerton Town railway station redundant.

The station was retained for goods traffic with it being reduced to a public delivery siding in 1968. Whilst it has been altered many time over the intervening years, the station building survives as a retail space, but the platform has gone with two of the former goods sidings still extant as engineers sidings. The line through the site is still open and is part of the Northallerton–Eaglescliffe line.

== See also ==
- Railways in Northallerton

== Sources ==
- Chapman, Stephen (2010). Northallerton, Ripon & Wensleydale. Todmorden: Bellcode Books. ISBN 978-1-871233-23-0.

Preceding station	Historical railways	Following station
Northallerton (Low); Station closed; Line open	Leeds Northern Railway; North TransPennine	Brompton; Station closed; Line open
