= Potto railway station =

Disused railway station in North Yorkshire, England

Potto
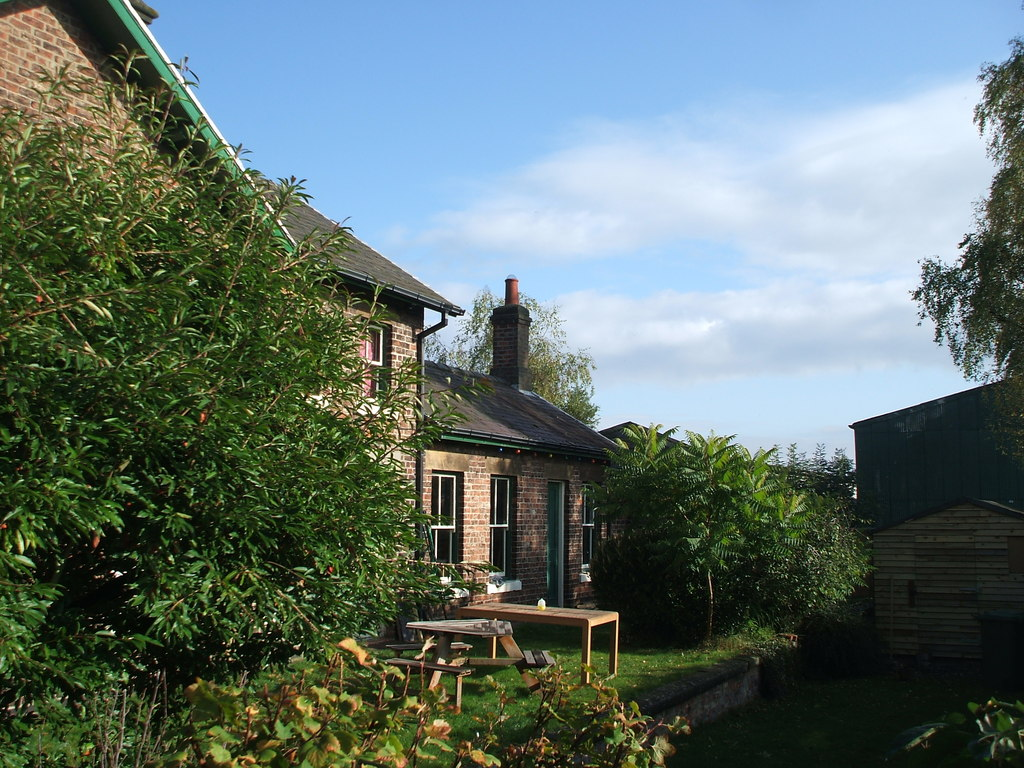
- The former station in 2009

General information
- Location: Potto, North Yorkshire; England
- Coordinates: 54°26′05.0″N 1°16′30.2″W
- Grid reference: NZ471046
- Platforms: 2

Other information
- Status: Disused

History
- Original company: North Yorkshire and Cleveland Railway
- Pre-grouping: North Eastern Railway
- Post-grouping: London North Eastern Railway

Key dates
- 3 March 1857: Station opened
- 12 June 1954: Station closed to passengers
- 1 December 1958: Station closed completely
Location

Potto railway station was a railway station built just north of the village of Potto in North Yorkshire, England. The station was on the North Yorkshire and Cleveland's railway line between Picton and Stokesley. The line was extended progressively until it met the Whitby and Pickering Line at Grosmont. Potto station was closed in 1954 to passengers and four years later to goods.

== History ==
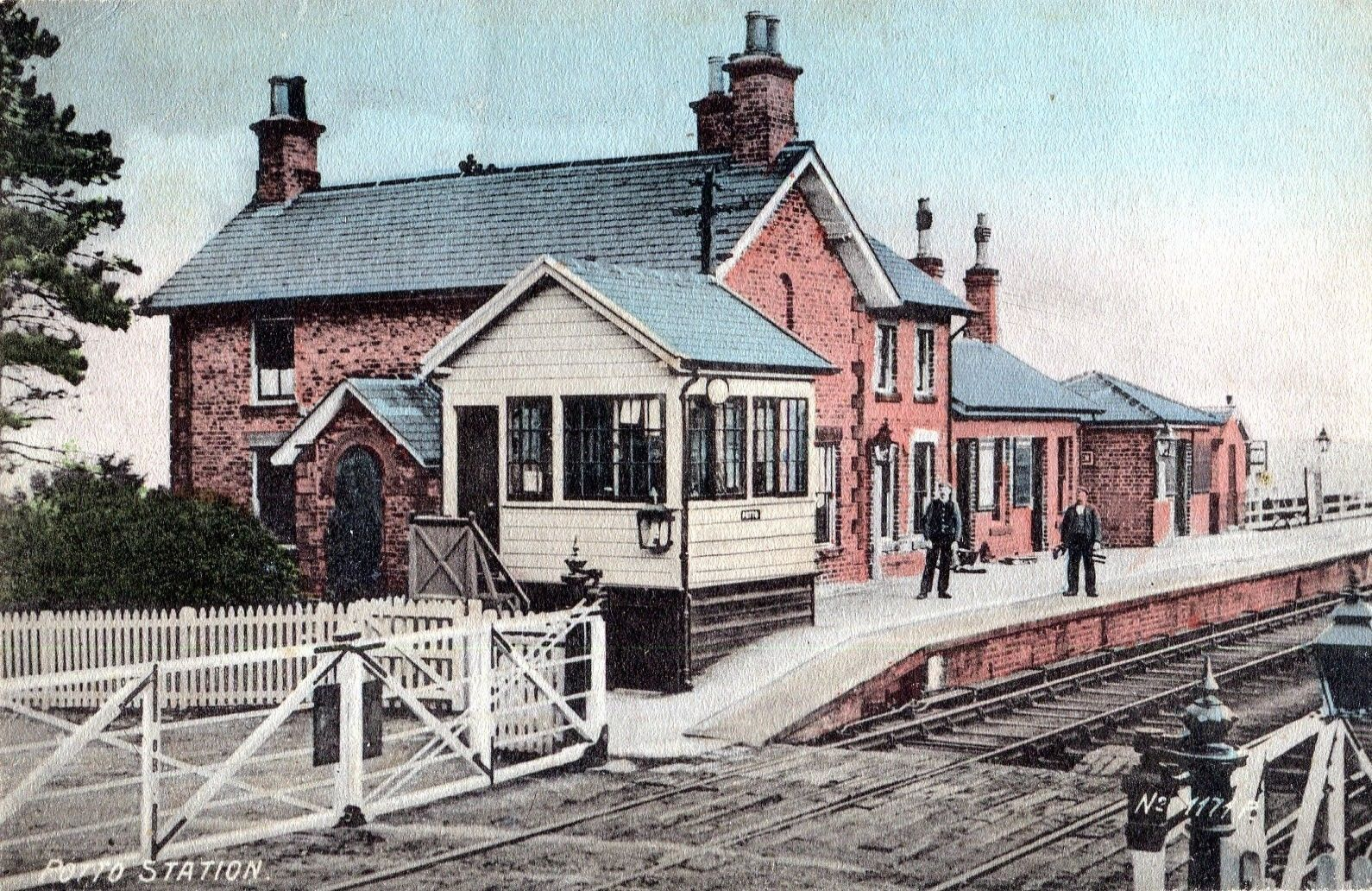
Potto station about 1905

The station was opened with the line in 1857 when the North Yorkshire and Cleveland Railway Company built their line between Picton and Stokesley. Picton became a north facing junction on the Leeds Northern Railway that allowed services on the line through Potto to work between Stockton and Whitby. The line and stations were taken over by the North Eastern Railway (NER) in 1859. The station was in use for passengers until 1954 when the line became freight only, with freight being withdrawn by December 1958. During the last few years of operation, only the eastbound track was used through the station, whilst the westbound track was used for wagon storage.

The station had only nine stationmasters, of whom the first three, were from the same family (grandfather, father and son) and were incumbent between 1857 and 1911. The last stationmaster was appointed in 1945 and he formally ended his tenure as stationmaster in 1960, just over a year after the line had closed.

Between 1867 and 1892, Potto was the junction for the Whorlton Branch line which served Ailesbury ironstone mines in the Whorlton and Swainby region to the south of Potto.

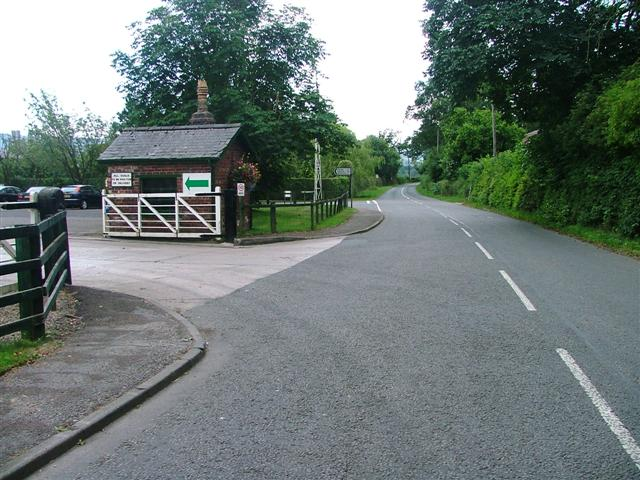
Cabin in the former station yard

After closure, the main station building became a private house with the goods yard and other sidings becoming part of the freight depot for a road freight haulier.

Preceding station	Disused railways	Following station
Trenholme Bar	NER; Picton-Battersby Line	Sexhow
