= Ingleby railway station =

Disused railway station in North Yorkshire, England

Ingleby
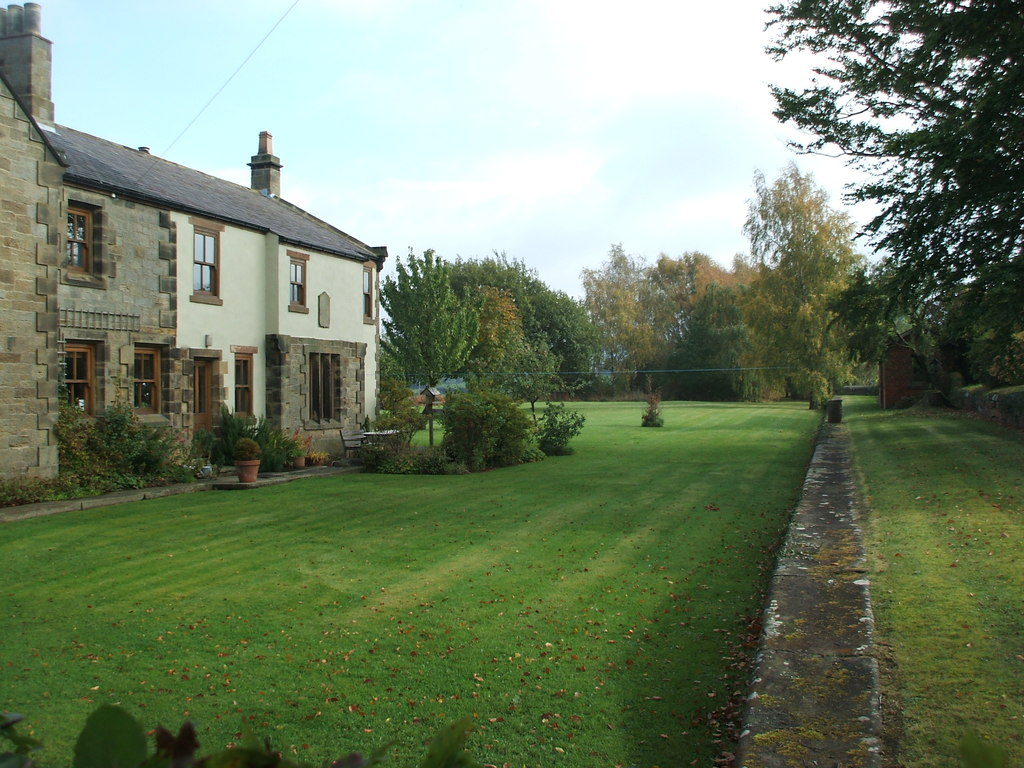
- Ingleby railway station site in 2009

General information
- Location: England
- Coordinates: 54.4548°N 1.1076°W
- Grid reference: NZ533074
- Platforms: 2

Other information
- Status: Disused

History
- Original company: North Yorkshire and Cleveland Railway
- Pre-grouping: North Eastern Railway
- Post-grouping: London and North Eastern Railway

Key dates
- 1 April 1861: Station opens
- 14 June 1954: Station closed
Location

Ingleby railway station was a railway station built to serve the village of Ingleby Greenhow in North Yorkshire, England. The station was on the North Yorkshire and Cleveland's railway line between Sexhow and Ingleby, which opened in 1857. The line was extended progressively until it met the Whitby & Pickering Railway at Grosmont. Ingleby station was closed in 1954 to passengers and four years later to goods. The station was located 19 miles (31 km) south of Stockton, and only 3/4 mile (1.2 km) west of Battersby railway station.

== History ==
The first stage of the North Yorkshire and Cleveland Railway was opened between Picton and Stokesley in March 1857. The line eastwards from Stokesley to Ingleby was opened in February 1858, though the station at Ingleby wasn't opened until 1861. From Ingleby, the extension of the line to Kildale, was opened in April 1858. The station was located 300 yards (270 m) north of Ingleby Greenhow and was furnished with three sidings in a goods yard on the eastbound platform. In 1859, two years before the station at Ingleby was opened, the North Eastern railway bought out the North Yorkshire and Cleveland Railway.

The timetable from 1864, when the line only extended as far as Castleton railway station, saw the station served by four trains on a daily basis with an earlier train on Wednesday mornings towards Stockton labelled as a Market Train. This came back in the late afternoons and terminated at Castleton. There was also one extra market train service on a Saturday leaving Stockton at 16:30 for all stations to Castleton. Bradshaw's timetable of 1877 shows five out and back workings between Stockton railway station and Whitby, with connections advertised in Middlesbrough. A working North Eastern Railway document shows that the station had five passenger services each way throughout the week. The goods trains passing through were minerals, coal, the pick-up goods and a daily service of coke to the ironworks at Grosmont.

The timetable of 1906 shows that the station had six services eastbound from Stockton railway station via Trenholme Bar, with five going all the way to Whitby and one terminating at Battersby railway station. Return services were just five a day with four coming from Whitby. The other service from Whitby reversed at Battersby and went to Stockton via Middlesbrough railway station. By 1946, eight years before closure, the service was down to just three stopping services each way per day, with most of the services from Whitby to Stockton reversing at Battersby and going via Middlesbrough.

The station was closed to passengers in 1954, along with most others on the line, however, Ingleby was also closed to freight on the same day, the first on the line to do so. When the line was lifted at the western end, the eastern portion from Battersby to Stokesley remained open for freight. This was finally closed in August 1965.

The nearest railway station to Ingleby is Battersby railway station, which is located on the Esk Valley Line.

Preceding station	Disused railways	Following station
Stokesley; Line and station closed	NER; Picton-Battersby Line	Battersby; Line closed, station open
