= West Rounton Gates railway station =

Disused railway station in North Yorkshire, England

West Rounton Gates
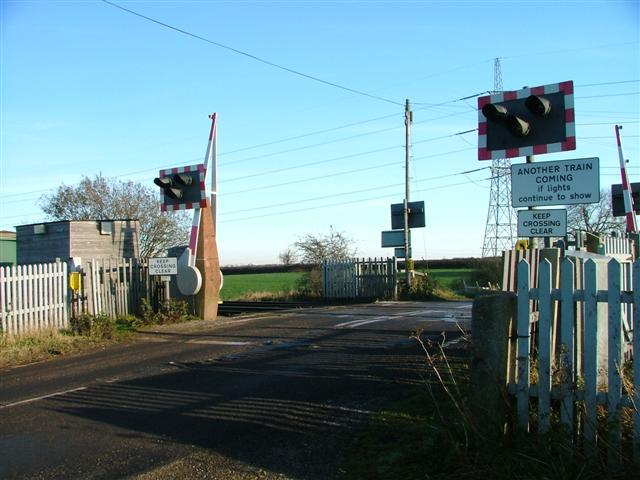
- West Rounton Gates Crossing.The station was to the left of the level crossing

General information
- Other names: West Rounton Gate
- Location: West Rounton; North Yorkshire; England
- Coordinates: 54.434°N 1.368°W
- Ordnance Survey: NZ410045
- Elevation: 180 feet (55 m)
- Line: Northallerton to Eaglescliffe Line
- Platforms: 2

History
- Opened: May 1864
- Closed: 13 September 1939
- Original company: Leeds Northern Railway
- Pre-grouping: North Eastern Railway
- Post-grouping: London and North Eastern Railway
Location

West Rounton Gates railway station, was a railway station between Welbury and Picton railway stations on the Leeds Northern Railway in North Yorkshire, England. The station was opened in 1864, but it was served by trains on Wednesdays only for the market day in Stockton-on-Tees.

== History ==
The line between Northallerton and Eaglescliffe (now part of the North TransPennine route), was opened on 2 June 1852 by the Leeds Northern Railway, being 54 1/2 miles (87.7 km) north of Leeds Central railway station, and 10 miles (16 km) south of Stockton-on-Tees. Whilst the two stations either side of West Rounton Gates were opened with the line, West Rounton itself did not appear in timetables until May 1864. The Railway Clearing Handbook shows the station being only equipped to handle passengers, and mapping from 1911 does not show any goods sidings. The station was only used on Wednesdays, when those living in the area could travel to Stockton-on-Tees for the local market.

The station was closed completely in September 1939. Whilst the date is significant for the Second World War, it was not listed as one of the stations closed by the LNER as an economy measure.

The level crossing and line are still open. The level crossing is 6 miles 68 chains (11 km) south of Eaglescliffe, and 7 miles 13 chains (11.5 km) North of Low Gates crossing in Northallerton.

== Services ==
The 1866 timetable shows that two early morning trains stopped on their way north, and two returns in an afternoon on Wednesdays only.

Though the station is listed in the index for the 1944 timetable, no services show calling there. Some timetables referred to the station as West Rounton Gate until around 1903–1904.

Preceding station	Historical railways	Following station
Welbury; Line open; station closed	North Eastern Railway; Northallerton–Eaglescliffe line	Picton; Line open; station closed
