= Picton railway station (England) =

Disused railway station in North Yorkshire, England

Picton
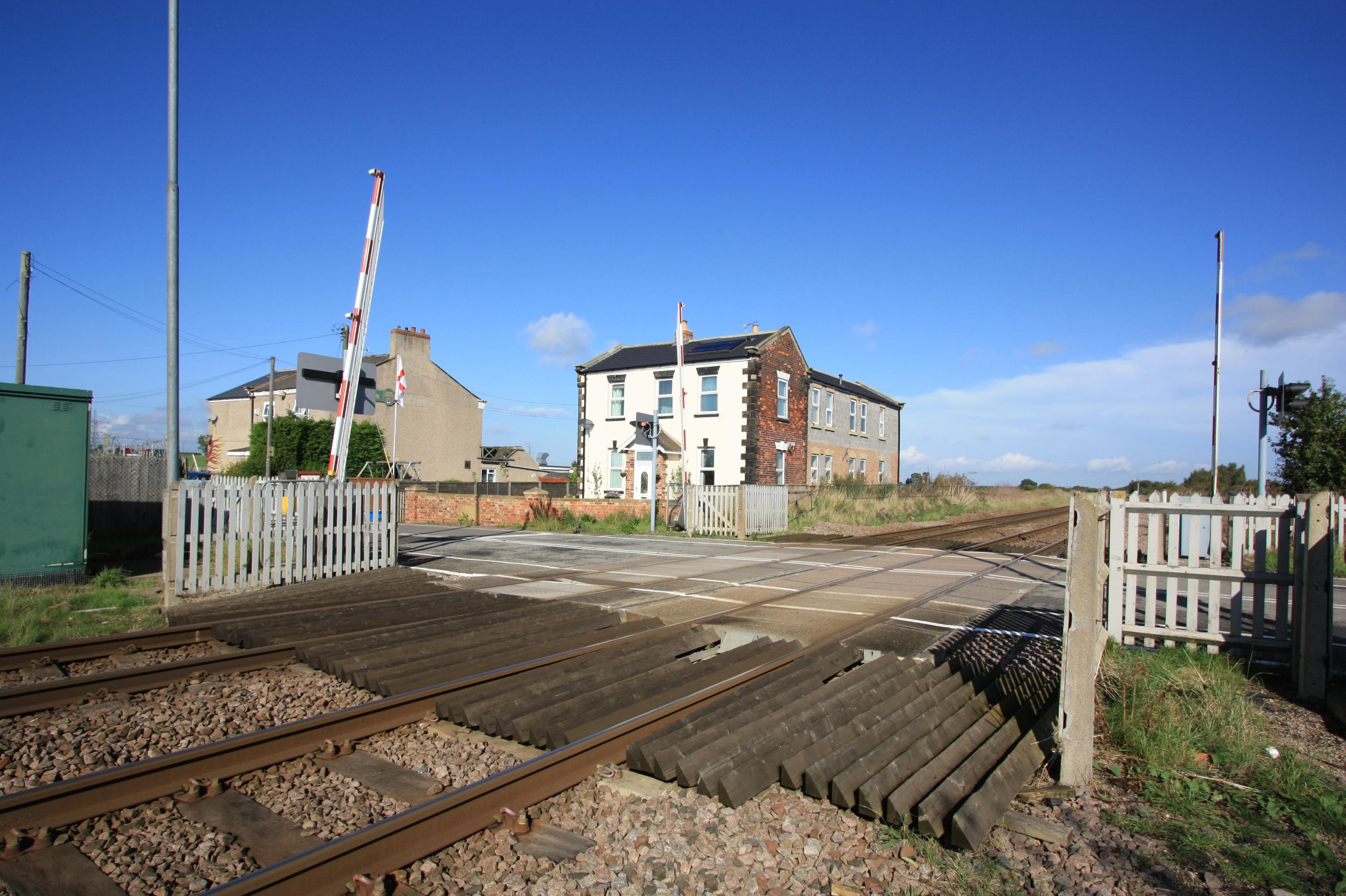
- Railway crossing with the old station buildings in the background, in 2010

General information
- Location: Picton, North Yorkshire; England
- Coordinates: 54.4649°N 1.3492°W
- Grid reference: NZ422079
- Platforms: 2

Other information
- Status: Disused

History
- Original company: Leeds Northern Railway
- Pre-grouping: North Eastern Railway
- Post-grouping: London and North Eastern Railway

Key dates
- 2 June 1852: Opened
- 4 January 1960: Closed to passengers
- 7 July 1964: Closed completely
Location

Picton railway station was a railway station serving the village of Picton in North Yorkshire, England. Located on the Northallerton to Eaglescliffe Line (which is now the North TransPennine line) it was opened on 2 June 1852 by the Leeds Northern Railway. It closed to passengers on 4 January 1960 and closed completely in July 1964.

== History ==
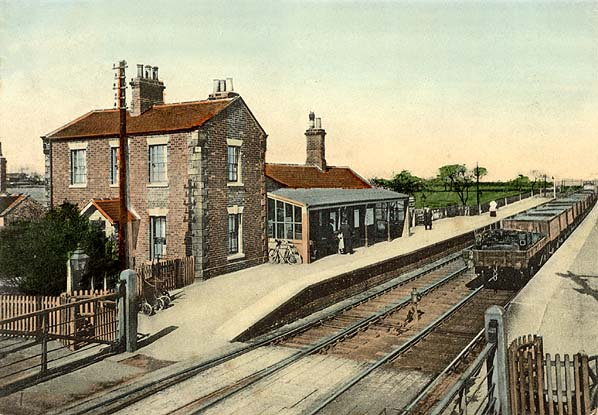
The station as it appeared in 1904

The station was located just north of the junction for the North Yorkshire and Cleveland Railway line to Battersby and Grosmont on the Whitby and Pickering Railway. It was 2 miles (3.2 km) south of Yarm and 10 miles (16 km) north of Northallerton. Local services started at the station with the opening of the Leeds Northern Railway and then along the Battersby line when the first section to Stokesley opened in 1857.

With the full opening of the line to Grosmont in 1865, four out and back services to Whitby per day were worked along the Battersby line. The timetable from 1906 shows that the station had five stopping services each way on both lines; the services south went to Northallerton and the services on the line to Stokesley originated in Stockton and ran through to Whitby. By 1922, this was down to four services on the Battersby line, and by the time of the closure of that line to passengers in 1954, the service ran to only two trains per day through Picton.

The station remained open for a further six years for local services on the Northallerton to Eaglescliffe line, and was closed to passengers in 1960. The station closed to goods traffic in January 1964, with the goods yard being used by a stone merchant. The stationmasters house still stands, but the other buildings have all been demolished.

The line through the site remains open as part of the Northallerton to Eaglescliffe line.

Preceding station	Historical railways	Following station
West Rounton Gates; Line open; station closed	North Eastern Railway; Northallerton–Eaglescliffe line	Yarm; Line and station open
	Disused railways	
Trenholme Bar; Line and station closed	North Eastern Railway; Picton-Battersby line	Yarm; Line and station open
