= Brompton railway station =

Disused railway station in North Yorkshire, England

Brompton
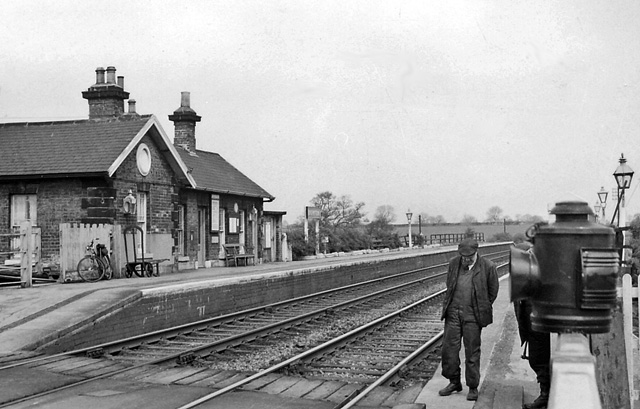
- Brompton station looking north-eastwards towards Eaglescliffe, in 1961

General information
- Location: Brompton, North Yorkshire; England
- Coordinates: 54°21′52.2″N 1°25′30.1″W
- Grid reference: SE374966
- Platforms: 2

Other information
- Status: Disused

History
- Original company: Leeds Northern Railway
- Pre-grouping: North Eastern Railway
- Post-grouping: London and North Eastern Railway

Key dates
- 1854: Station opened
- 6 September 1965: Station closed
Location

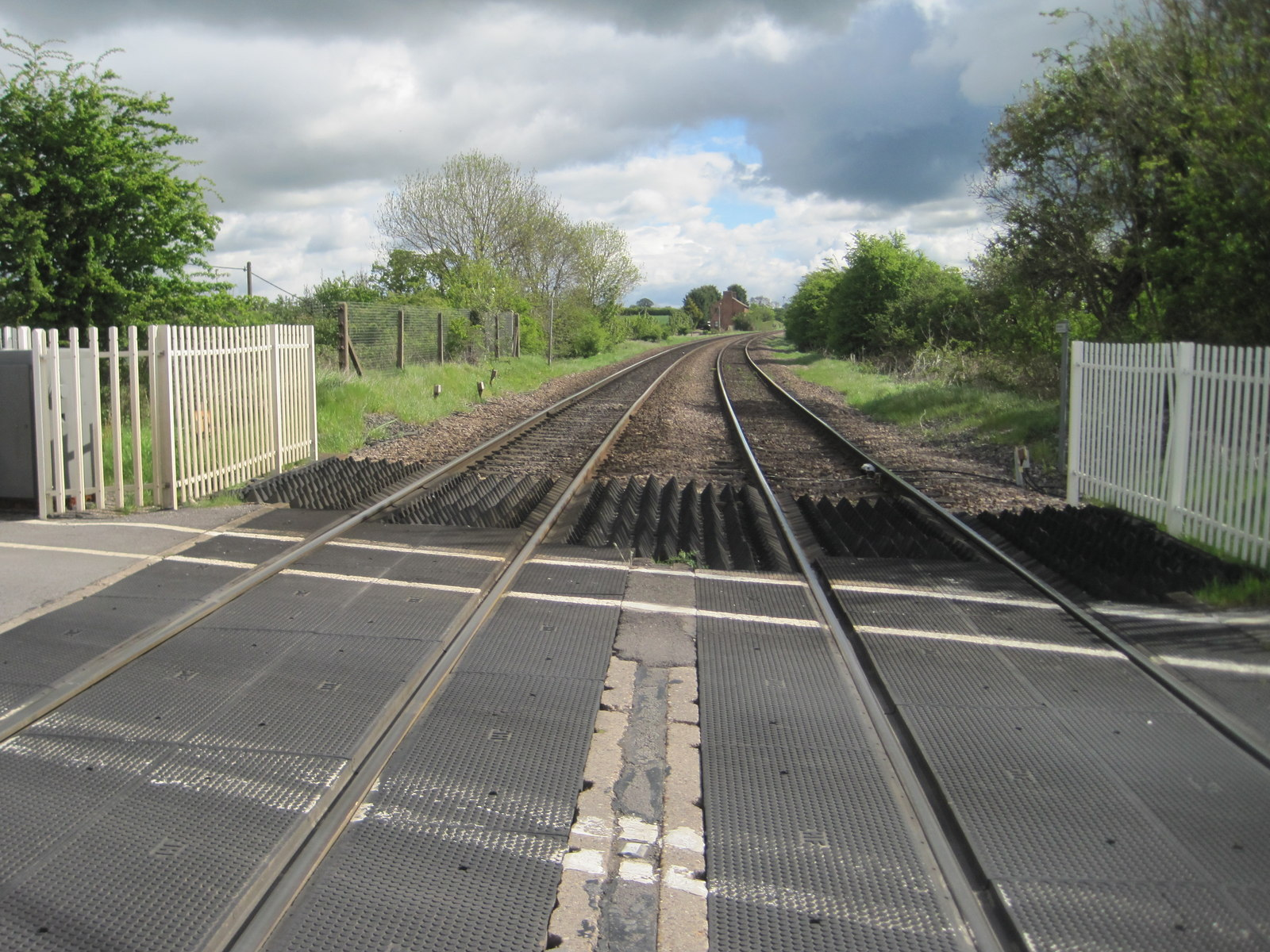
The site of the station as it appeared in 2015

Brompton railway station was a railway station that served the town of Brompton, North Yorkshire, England. It was opened in 1854 and closed in 1965. The line it was on is still open and carries passenger traffic to and from Sunderland and Middlesbrough to Manchester Airport and London King's Cross.

== History ==
The Leeds Northern Railway line between Northallerton and Eaglescliffe was opened in 1852; the station opened in 1854. It was equipped with three sidings to the south of the level crossing a weighbridge, a coal drop, and a private siding. The principal freight from the station was hay and clover. The level crossing is still in operation, though the station buildings were demolished in the early 2000s.

Passenger trains in 1906 amounted to six stopping trains either way. Most ran between Leeds and Hartlepool; the remainder were services between Northallerton and Hartlepool.

The station was closed on 6 September 1965. It was the last intermediate station still in operation between Northallerton and Eaglescliffe (although Yarm railway station reopened in 1996).

The railway is still in operation for passenger trains to and from Sunderland (Grand Central), and to and from Middlesbrough (TransPennine Express). The line is also used for freight trains between the northeast and the south.

== 1924 accident ==
On 17 March 1924, a train between Northallerton and West Hartlepool derailed after travelling through a crossover at 40 miles per hour (64 km/h). Men were working on the line and crossings to replace worn out tracks and fittings. Unwittingly, the gauge at the crossover was too wide and the last four coaches of the train derailed, with some mounting the platform on the opposite side of the line.

Preceding station	Historical railways	Following station
Northallerton Town; Line open; station closed	North Eastern Railway; Northallerton–Eaglescliffe line	Welbury; Line open; station closed
Northallerton; Line and station open	North Eastern Railway; Northallerton–Eaglescliffe line	Welbury; Line open; station closed
