= Welbury railway station =

Disused railway station in North Yorkshire, England

Welbury
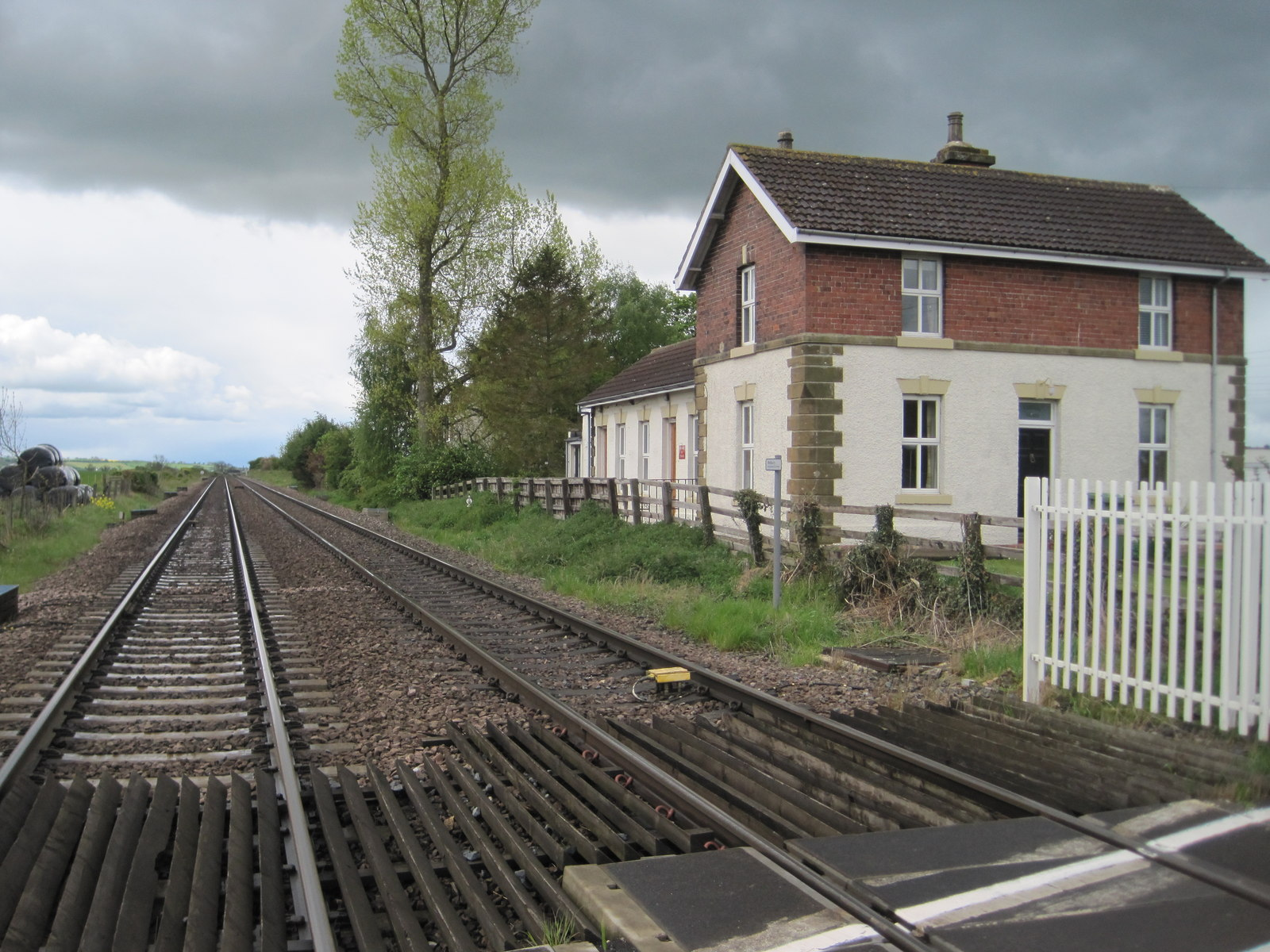
- The former station building in 2015

General information
- Location: England
- Coordinates: 54.408171°N 1.382325°W
- Grid reference: NZ401015
- Platforms: 2

Other information
- Status: Disused

History
- Original company: Leeds Northern Railway
- Pre-grouping: North Eastern Railway
- Post-grouping: London and North Eastern Railway

Key dates
- 2 June 1852: Opened
- 1954: Closed to passengers
- 1963: Closed completely
Location

Welbury railway station was a railway station serving the village of Welbury in North Yorkshire, England. Located on the Northallerton to Eaglescliffe Line (now part of the North TransPennine route) it was opened on 2 June 1852 by the Leeds Northern Railway. It closed to passengers on 20 September 1954 and closed completely in 1963.

The station was located 5.6 miles (9 km) north of Northallerton station and 8.7 miles (14 km) south of Eaglescliffe.

The line is still open for passenger and freight trains, with TransPennine Express providing an hourly service between Manchester Airport, Middlesbrough and Redcar Central and Grand Central providing five trains per day in each direction between Sunderland and London King's Cross. Freight is mostly, steel, coal and biomass run by several operators.

There is a level crossing at Welbury which is controlled by Low Gates box in Northallerton.

Preceding station	Historical railways	Following station
Brompton; Line open; station closed	North Eastern Railway; Northallerton–Eaglescliffe line	West Rounton Gates; Line open; station closed
