= Stokesley railway station =

Disused railway station in North Yorkshire, England

Stokesley
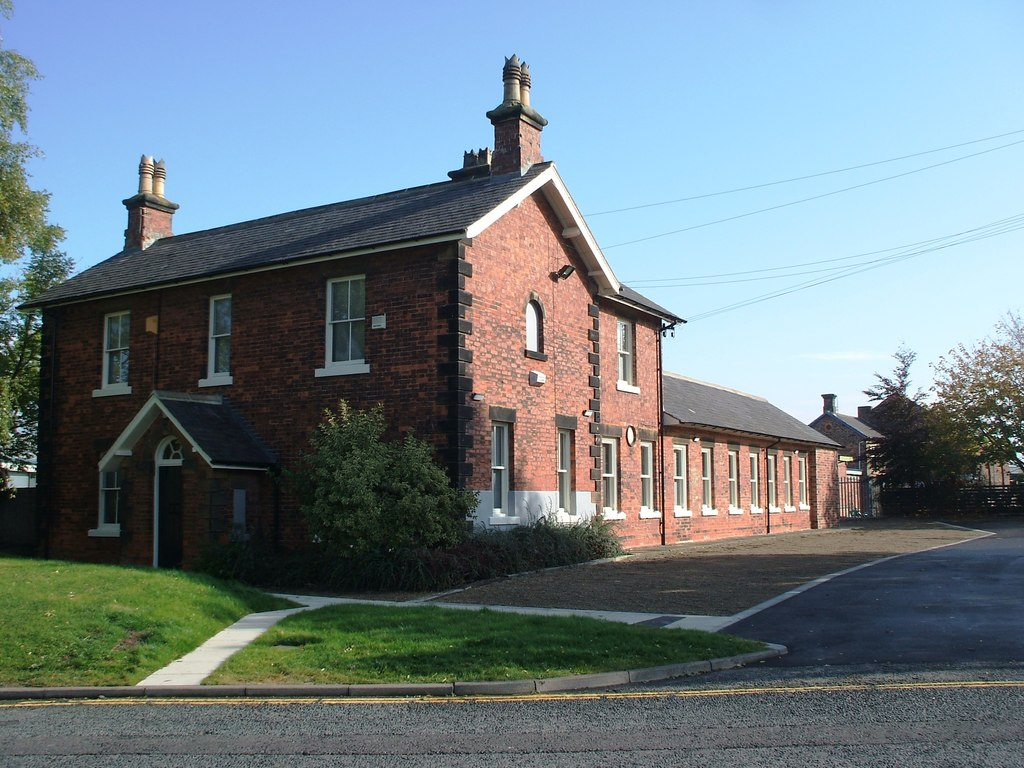
- The main buildings of Stokesley railway station in 2009. This is looking north eastwards.

General information
- Location: Stokesley, North Yorkshire; England
- Coordinates: 54.4594°N 1.1800°W
- Grid reference: NZ579069
- Platforms: 2

Other information
- Status: Disused

History
- Original company: North Yorkshire and Cleveland Railway
- Pre-grouping: North Eastern Railway
- Post-grouping: London and North Eastern Railway

Key dates
- 2 March 1857: Station opens
- 14 June 1954: Closed to passengers
- 2 August 1965: Closed completely
Location

Stokesley railway station was a railway station built to serve the town of Stokesley in North Yorkshire, England. The station was on the North Yorkshire and Cleveland line between Sexhow and Ingleby, which opened in 1857. The line was extended progressively until it met the Whitby & Pickering Railway at Grosmont. It was closed in 1954 to passengers and eleven years later to goods. The station was located 16 miles (26 km) south of Stockton and 3 1/2 miles (5.6 km) west of Battersby station.

== History ==
A railway station had been planned for Stokesley in the 1830s when the Stockton and Darlington Railway Company issued a prospectus for an extension of their line from Yarm to Stokesley. In the end, this line was never built and the first railway station in Stokesley came about with the opening of the North Yorkshire and Cleveland Railway in 1857. The station was opened formally on 2 March 1857 and then to the public on the following day. Stokesley was a terminus for a year until the line eastwards was opened up progressively in 1858 to Ingleby and then Kildale. The station was actually located 1 mile (1.6 km) south of Stokesley town; it was in the parish of Kirkby.

Stokesley is a market town, and as such, was the most important and heavily used station on the line, for both passengers and freight. Excursion trains would be laid on for the annual agricultural show and various freight workings used the yard. Between 1885 and 1922, tickets issued at Stokesley varied between 19,000 and 14,000, however, by 1934, this had fallen dramatically to 2,707.

Bradshaw's timetable of 1877 shows five out and back workings between Stockton railway station and Whitby, with connections advertised in Middlesbrough. The timetable of 1906 shows that the station had six services eastbound from Stockton railway station via Trenholme Bar, with five going all the way to Whitby and one terminating at Battersby railway station. Return services were just five a day with four coming from Whitby. The other service from Whitby reversed at Battersby and went to Stockton via Middlesbrough railway station. By 1946, eight years before closure, the service was down to just three stopping services each way per day, with most of the services from Whitby to Stockton reversing at Battersby and going via Middlesbrough.

Besides the main station buildings, which were on the eastbound platform, there was a signal box, the stationmaster's house, the house for the signalman and four workers cottages set in an "L" shape with a communal courtyard. The goods shed which was built in between 1857 and 1858 still stands. The goods sidings and coal depot were located on the northern side of the line. Fresh water was piped from a spring near to Battersby station with the pipe being laid between the two railway tracks.

The station features in the British Transport Films film entitled A Farmer Moves South. In it, a local farmer from Skutterskelfe moves his farm to Sussex on 31 December 1950, reputedly the coldest night of the year.

The station was closed to passengers in June 1954, with the tracks westbound being lifted so that all trains had to leave eastbound, making Stokesley a terminal station again. The station closed completely in August 1965. The nearest railway station to Stokesley is now Great Ayton some 3.7 miles (6 km) to the east, which is served by a handful of trains per day. There are plans for a park and ride station known as Roseberry Parkway to the north which would have an enhanced rail service.

Preceding station	Disused railways	Following station
Sexhow; Line and station closed	NER; Picton-Battersby Line	Ingleby; Line and station closed
