= Trenholme Bar railway station =

Disused railway station in North Yorkshire, England

Trenholme Bar

General information
- Location: North Yorkshire; England
- Coordinates: 54.4386°N 1.3235°W
- Grid reference: NZ439050
- Platforms: 2

Other information
- Status: Disused

History
- Original company: North Yorkshire and Cleveland Railway
- Pre-grouping: North Eastern Railway
- Post-grouping: London and North Eastern Railway

Key dates
- April 1857: Station opened
- 14 June 1954: Closed to passengers
- 1 December 1958: Closed completely
Location

Trenholme Bar railway station was a railway station built to serve the hamlet of Trenholme Bar in North Yorkshire, England. The station was on the North Yorkshire and Cleveland's railway line between Picton and Stokesley, which opened in 1857. The line was extended progressively until it met the Whitby & Pickering Railway at Grosmont. Trenholme Bar station was closed in 1954 to passengers and four years later to goods. The station was located 9 miles (14 km) south of Stockton, and 10 miles (16 km) west of Battersby railway station.

The A19 trunk road now runs through part of the station site.

== History ==
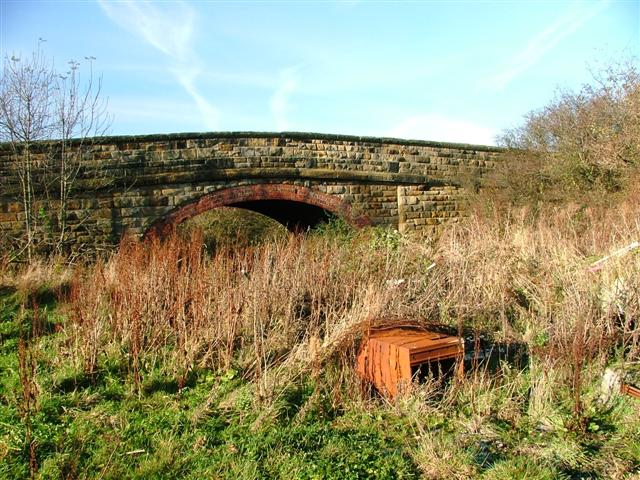
Peter Hill Bridge, Trenholme Lane. This was just east of the station site

The station was opened with the line in 1857 when the North Yorkshire and Cleveland Railway Company built their line between Picton and Stokesley, but just two years later, the line and stations were taken over by the North Eastern Railway (NER). Whilst the station was situated in a hamlet that had a crossing over a main north–south road (later the A19), it was the nearest railway station for Crathorne to the north and Mount Grace Priory to the south.

A derailment occurred some 300 yards (270 m) east of the station on 7 September 1866. A late-running train that was not due to stop at Trenholme Bar, left the rails and fell to the south side of the running line. The train was believed to have been travelling at between 30 miles per hour (48 km/h) and 35 miles per hour (56 km/h) at the time. It caused some injuries and two deaths, with the bodies being moved to an inn at nearby Hutton Rudby, where an inquest was opened soon afterwards. The Board of Inquiry found that the engine was a goods engine which was too heavy for the line it was on and it was stated that "...the permanent way was unable to withstand the strain thus put upon it."

Bradshaw's timetable of 1877 shows five out and back workings between Stockton railway station and Whitby, with connections advertised in Middlesbrough. The timetable of 1906 shows that the station had six services eastbound from Stockton railway station towards Stokesley, with five going all the way to Whitby and one terminating at Battersby railway station. Return services were just five a day with four coming from Whitby. The other service from Whitby reversed at Battersby and went to Stockton via Middlesbrough railway station. By 1946, eight years before closure, the service was down to just three stopping services each way per day, with most of the services from Whitby to Stockton reversing at Battersby and going via Middlesbrough.

The station was furnished with a small goods yard on the south side of the line. It had three sidings, one with a coal depot. The station closed in June 1954. When the A19 road was widened in the 1970s, the dual carriageway took up some of the former station site.

Preceding station	Disused railways	Following station
Picton; Line and station closed	NER; Picton-Battersby Line	Potto; Line and station closed
