= Sexhow =

Hamlet and civil parish in North Yorkshire, England

Coordinates: 54°26′51″N 1°15′57″W

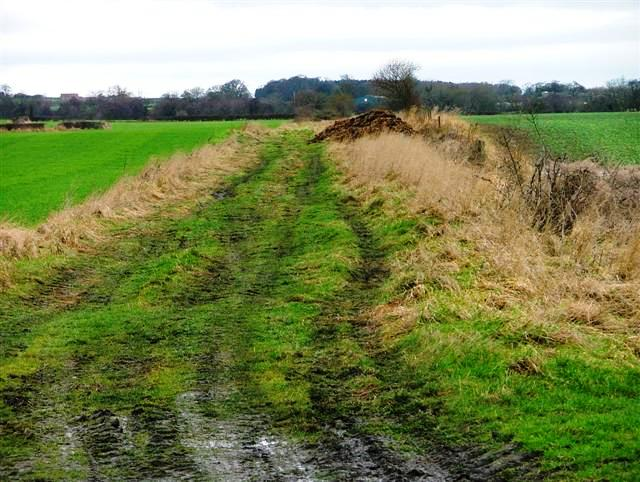
- Track of old railway line through Sexhow

- Location within North Yorkshire
- Civil parish: Sexhow
- Unitary authority: North Yorkshire
- Ceremonial county: North Yorkshire
- Region: Yorkshire and the Humber
- Country: England
- Sovereign state: United Kingdom
- Postcode district: TS15
- Dialling code: 01642
- Police: North Yorkshire
- Fire: North Yorkshire
- Ambulance: Yorkshire

Sexhow is a hamlet and civil parish in the county of North Yorkshire, England. The name of the hamlet derives from Old Norse of either sexhou or sekkshaughr, which means the hill of Sekk, a personal name. The population taken at the 2011 Census was less than 100, so details of the population are included on the civil parish of Potto. However, in 2015, North Yorkshire County Council estimated the population to be 20. It is on the River Leven and 5 miles (8 km) west of Stokesley.

From 1974 to 2023 it was part of the Hambleton District, it is now administered by the unitary North Yorkshire Council.

Sexhow hosts the annual Elim Festival every summer, organised by the Elim Pentecostal Church.

Sexhow station was on the Picton-Battersby Line; it operated from 1857 until passenger services on the line ended in 1954.

There used to be a hall where Sexhow Park Farm now stands. Sexhow Park Farm has been the location of the 'Cornshed' music festival since 1986. Sexhow Hall is a grade II* listed building.

A legendary dragon that plagued the village is a folk tale known as The Worm of Sexhow. It was described as being a beast that would feed on dairy and breathe out fire to burn farmers crops. One day, a knight came into the village, slew the beast and rode out again. The beast's scaly skin was said to have been displayed inside nearby Hutton Rudby church.
