= Picton, North Yorkshire =

Hamlet and civil parish in North Yorkshire, England

Coordinates: 54.46021°N 1.36044°W

Picton
- Location within North Yorkshire
- Population: 135 (2011 census)
- OS grid reference: NZ415075
  - London: 210 mi (340 km) S
- Unitary authority: North Yorkshire
- Ceremonial county: North Yorkshire
- Region: Yorkshire and the Humber
- Country: England
- Sovereign state: United Kingdom
- Post town: YARM
- Postcode district: TS15
- Police: North Yorkshire
- Fire: North Yorkshire
- Ambulance: Yorkshire

Picton is a hamlet and civil parish located in the north of North Yorkshire, England. It is situated approximately 4 miles (6 km) south from Yarm, 8 miles (13 km) south from Middlesbrough, and just over 1 mile (1.6 km) west from the A19 road. The name of the village derives from Old English and means "Pica's farm or settlement." Up until the 1850s, the village was spelt as Pickton with the old spelling being cut into the Picton Liberty stone which marked the boundary between the parishes of Picton and Kirklevington.

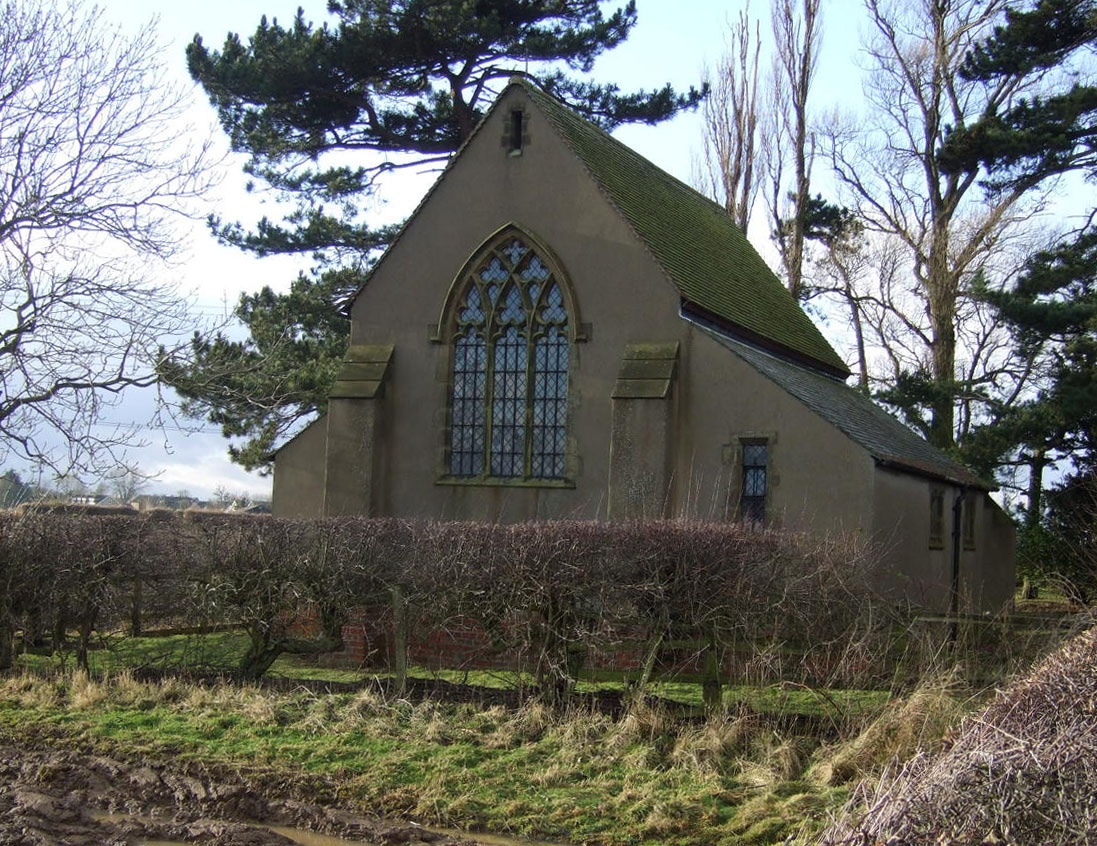
Church in Picton, now disused

The parish had a population of 108 according to the 2001 census, increasing to 135 at the 2011 Census. From 1974 to 2023 it was part of the Hambleton District, it is now administered by the unitary North Yorkshire Council. It lies just south of the border with the Stockton-on-Tees unitary authority.

A stream which lies east of the village is called the Picton Stell.

Every year Picton holds a show on the third Saturday in July. The event has horse, dog, craft and horticulture competitions, and traditional games and races for children. There is also a bar, and stalls for refreshment and entertainment.

This village contains The Station public house and a small disused church, the grade II listed Church of St Hilary, which was abandoned in 2004 due to structural problems. The Station pub takes its name from the railway station that was just east of the village on the Northallerton to Eaglescliffe line. The station was also a junction for trains on the Picton to Battersby line. The station was closed to passengers in 1960 and to goods in 1964.
