= Nunthorpe–Battersby Link =

Former railway line in Yorkshire, England

The Nunthorpe–Battersby Link was a short line connecting the Middlesbrough and Guisborough Railway and the now disused Picton-Battersby Line.

The line, which was opened in April 1868, ran from Nunthorpe Junction to Battersby. It remains in use today as part of the Esk Valley Line.
