= Sexhow Hall =

Building in Sexhow, North Yorkshire, England

Coordinates: 54.4487°N 1.2665°W

Sexhow Hall is a historic building in Sexhow, a village in North Yorkshire, in England.

The manor house was built in the late Mediaeval period, by the Layton family. It was extended in the 17th century, then in about 1800 the original hall was replaced by a new wing. By the mid 19th century, it was divided to form two farmhouses, the larger retaining the name of the hall, and the smaller becoming "Old Hall Cottage". Both hall and cottage were extended in the 20th century. The building was grade II* listed in 1966.

The house is largely built of sandstone with some brickwork, and the high pitched roofs are pantile, with a massive chimneystack. The stone in the Mediaeval wing is squared, in the 17th-century wing is herringbone, and in the cottage is rubble. The upper floor of the Mediaeval wing is timber framed and encased in brick. The building is two storeys high, with the hall being three bays wide, and the cottage two bays wide. The original mullioned windows have been replaced with sashes. Inside, one bedroom has ornamental 16th-century plasterwork, and there are a 14th-century doorway and fireplace.

== See also ==
- Grade II* listed buildings in North Yorkshire (district)
