= Listed buildings in Potto, North Yorkshire =

Potto is a civil parish in the county of North Yorkshire, England. It contains six listed buildings that are recorded in the National Heritage List for England. All the listed buildings are designated at Grade II, the lowest of the three grades, which is applied to "buildings of national importance and special interest". The parish contains the village of Potto and the surrounding countryside, and the listed buildings consist of houses and associated structures.

== Buildings ==
Name and location	Photograph	Date	Notes
Potto Grange; 54.43124°N 1.27869°W	—	Early to mid-18th century	The house was extended in the early 19th century. The early part forms the rear wing, and is in whitewashed brick, with a corbelled brick cornice, and a pantile roof. It has two storeys and three bays, and contains sash windows, some horizontally sliding, and French windows. The later part, forming the front range, is in brownish-red brick on a stone plinth, with a hipped Welsh slate roof. There are two storeys and three bays, and it contains a doorway with a fanlight in a Roman Doric doorcase with an open pediment, and sash windows with gauged flat brick arches. On the right return is a full height segmental bow window.
Church Cottage; 54.42610°N 1.27063°W	—	18th century	The house is in stone, and has a pantile roof with stone gable copings. There are two storeys and two bays. On the front is a doorway and horizontally sliding sash windows, and all the openings have lintels with keystones.
Wandhill Farmhouse; 54.42884°N 1.28603°W	—	18th century	The farmhouse is in whitewashed brick, with a stepped eaves cornice, and a pantile roof with stone gable copings. There are two storeys and two bays, and flanking single-storey single-bay wings. On the front is a doorway, the left wing contains a modern window, and the other windows are sashes, those in the upper floor horizontally sliding.
Lane House; 54.42454°N 1.27603°W	—	Early 19th century	The house is in sandstone, and has a pantile roof with stone gable copings and kneelers. There are two storeys and three bays, and an added bay to the left. On the front are two doorways and imitation horizontally sliding sash windows.
Outbuildings and wall north of Potto Grange; 54.43147°N 1.27872°W	—	Early 19th century	The outbuildings consist of a stable and granary and a coach house, in stone and red brick, that have pantile roofs with stone copings and kneelers. On the stable are external steps, and the former coach house has an elliptical-headed carriage entry with voussoirs. Attached to the north range is a stone coped wall.
Barn northeast of Wandhill Farmhouse; 54.42903°N 1.28609°W	—	Early to mid-19th century	The barn is in red brick with a pantile roof, and is in two parts. The northern part has two storeys and contains slit vents, and the southern part has one storey and has a blocked segmental wagon arch with pigeon holes above.
