= Yarm railway station =

Railway station in North Yorkshire, England

Yarm
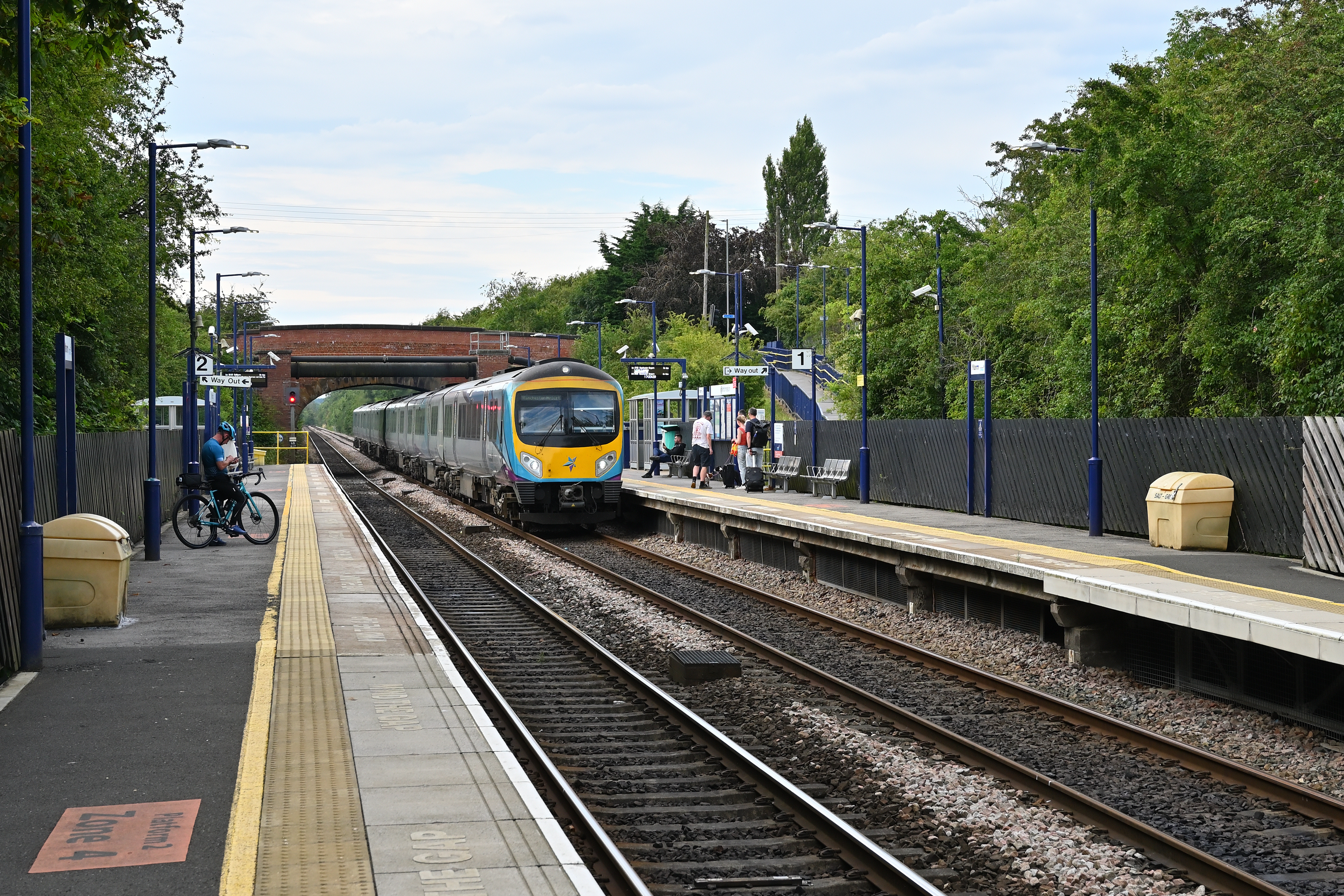
- Two Class 185 units at Yarm railway station

General information
- Location: Kirklevington, Borough of Stockton-on-Tees; England
- Coordinates: 54°29′38″N 1°21′05″W
- Grid reference: NZ420111
- Owner: Network Rail
- Manager: TransPennine Express
- Platforms: 2
- Tracks: 2

Other information
- Station code: YRM
- Classification: DfT category F2

History
- Original company: Leeds Northern Railway
- Pre-grouping: North Eastern Railway
- Post-grouping: London and North Eastern Railway; British Rail (North Eastern Region)

Key dates
- 25 May 1852: Opened
- 4 January 1960: Closed
- 19 February 1996: Resited and reopened

Passengers
- 2020/21: ▼26,302
- 2021/22: ▲0.103 million
- 2022/23: ▼98,818
- 2023/24: ▲0.125 million
- 2024/25: ▲0.146 million
Location
- Location within North Yorkshire
Notes
- Passenger statistics from the Office of Rail and Road

Yarm is a railway station on the Northallerton–Eaglescliffe Line, which connects the East Coast Main Line and Tees Valley Line. The station, situated 12 miles 7 chains (19 km) north-east of Northallerton, serves the market town of Yarm, Borough of Stockton-on-Tees in North Yorkshire, England. It is owned by Network Rail and managed by TransPennine Express.

== History ==
The station was originally opened by the Leeds Northern Railway on 25 May 1852. It was closed by British Rail on 4 January 1960. The former station building is still in place today, and is situated on the north side of Yarm Viaduct, in Egglescliffe, County Durham.

The imposing red brick structure consists of 43 arches, and spans a total of 690 metres (2,260 ft) over the River Tees. The viaduct was designated a Grade II listed structure on 23 June 1966.

The current station was opened by Railtrack on 19 February 1996, and is located 1 1/8 miles (1.8 km) south of the former.

== Facilities ==
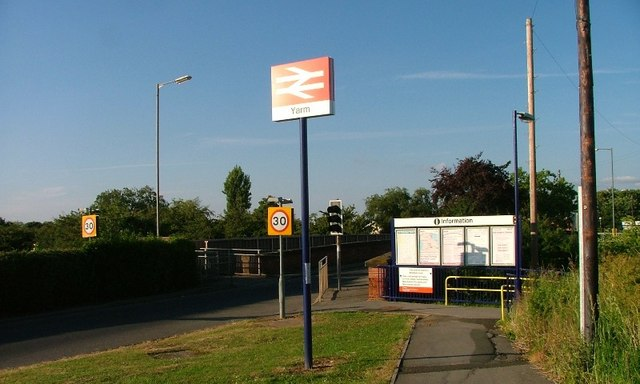
The station entrance from Green Lane, photographed in July 2006

The station is unstaffed, but a self-service ticket machine is available, which allows intending passengers to buy tickets before boarding or collect advance purchase/pre-paid tickets. The machine is located on platform 1 (bound for York/Manchester Piccadilly). There are waiting shelters, a customer help point, timetable posters and real-time information displays on both platforms. There is also a large free car park.

Both platforms have step-free access, and can be accessed by ramps from the road bridge on Green Lane.

== Services ==
As of the December 2024 timetable change, the station is served by an hourly service between Redcar Central and Manchester Airport via York.

Weekday and Saturday Services run every hour in both directions (roughly xx:18 each hour towards Redcar Central and xx:35 towards Manchester). Sunday services run to a similar pattern on a Sunday albeit with a later start. Three trains each day extend to/from Redcar to Saltburn.

== Sources ==
- Quick, Michael (2022) [2001]. Railway passenger stations in Great Britain: a chronology (PDF). version 5.04. Railway & Canal Historical Society. Archived from the original (PDF) on 25 November 2022.

Preceding station	National Rail	Following station
Northallerton	TransPennine Express; North TransPennine	Eaglescliffe
	Historical railways	
Picton; Line open; station closed	North Eastern Railway; Stockton–Whitby via Picton	Eaglescliffe; Line and station open
