= Rosedale Railway =

Former railway line in England

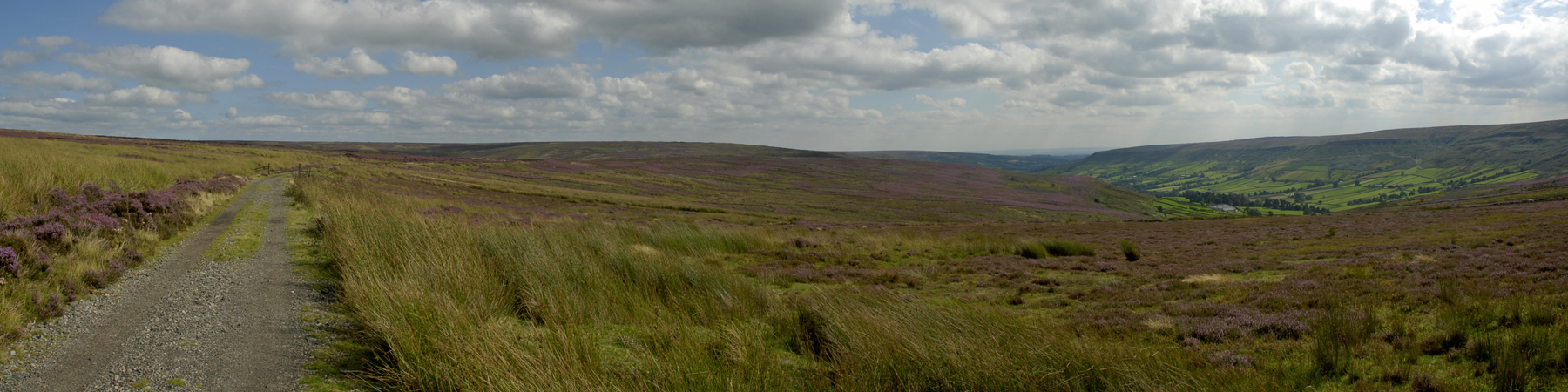
- Looking south across Rosedale Moor; the trackbed of the old railway leading away on the left, Farndale deep in green on the right

Overview
- Status: Closed, lifted
- Locale: North York Moors, England
- Termini: Battersby railway station; Rosedale West Rosedale East

Service
- Type: Heavy rail Freight railway

History
- Opened: 6 April 1858
- Converted to standard gauge: 27 March 1861
- Rosedale East branch opened: 18 August 1865
- Line closed: 11 June 1929

Technical
- Track length: 19 1/2 mi (31.4 km)
- Number of tracks: 1
- Track gauge: 1,435 mm (4 ft 8 1/2 in) standard gauge

The Rosedale Railway was a 19 1/2-mile (31.4 km) goods-only railway line running from Battersby Junction via Ingleby Incline, across the heights of the North York Moors in North Yorkshire, England to reach iron ore deposits in the remote hills of the Rosedale valley. It opened to traffic as a narrow gauge railway to Ingleby Incline top in 1858, converted to standard gauge and opened to Rosedale West in 1861, and closed completely in 1929. Apart from Ingleby Incline, no major engineering works were constructed, and as such, particularly the east branch, the railway followed the contours of the surrounding hillside. The former trackbeds of the railway are in use by walkers and cyclists.

== History ==
The first construction of a recognisable railway along this route was in 1858 when the Ingleby Ironstone and Freestone Mining Company constructed a narrow gauge line to link existing mining operations with the North Yorkshire and Cleveland Railway at Battersby (then known as Ingleby Junction). The North Eastern Railway (Bedale and Leyburn and Rosedale Railways Amalgamation) Act 1859 (22 & 23 Vict. c. xci) that covered the amalgamation into the NER of the line to Kildale and the Rosedale Railway meant that the NER became responsible for the lines in the area in August 1859, when the branch was still 18 months from completion. Because of the difference in height between the junction at Battersby railway station and the moorland location of the workings, a steep 1 in 5 (20%) incline was located at Ingleby, where trucks would be hauled up the slope to a height of 1,200 feet (370 m) above sea level using the weight of descending full wagons. The wagons descended at an average speed of 20 mph (32 km/h) which resulted in a journey time of 3 minutes from top to bottom.

When the NY&CR had been absorbed into the NER, the NER decided to convert the line to standard gauge operations and extend the track 10 miles (16 km) from the top of the incline to mine workings at Rosedale run by the Rosedale Ironstone Mining Company, in which the NER had interests. This line opened to the west side of Rosedale on 27 March 1861, costing £24,500. Within a few years mining also began on the east side of the valley, and an additional branch line was run from Blakey Junction around the head of the valley to reach the new workings. This was initially started by the railway company, but was completed by the NER and opened to traffic in August 1865. The branch to the east mines ran northwards from Blakey Junction for 1.2 miles (2 km) before curving eastwards and southwards, following the contours of the hillside. It dropped with a consistent gradient of 1-in-50 all the way from Blakey to Rosedale East. The mines at Rosedale East, Rosedale West and Blakey, were connected to the standard gauge line by tramways or narrow gauge railways. Only Sheriff Pit, which had a downshaft (the others being drift mines), had sidings directly onto the main running line.

The workings reached a peak production of over 560,000 long tons (569,000 tonnes) in 1873. Wagons containing ore were weighed at the weigh bridge located at Ingleby Incline foot, with all associated paperwork being dealt with at Battersby. Whilst there was a small goods station at Rosedale East, apart from come coal traded from that goods depot with the village of Rosedale Abbey, the branch was focussed on the iron ore trade. Passenger carrying was strictly limited to the families of the railwaymen and miners who worked in Rosedale. Trains would convey them to either Middlesbrough or Stockton and on the return, they would be carried up Ingleby Incline on the buffer beams of wagons, so that they need not walk up with their shopping.

The railway had two engine sheds; one was at the Rosedale West end of the line and consisted of two roads. A second shed was provided at Battersby Junction and had three roads in the shed, with two on the outside, one with a water tank and the other with a turntable. Engines working the line consisted of NER 1001 Class locomotives, which were eventually replaced with NER Class P, with just three examples latterly working the section of the line from the Incline top to Rosedale. Hoole and Huby (see Sources, below) reported that there was no signalling on the line but documentary evidence and the Ordnance Survey maps indicate that this was not the case. The line was divided into three single-line "Staff and Ticket" sections; Incline top to Blakey Junction, Blakey Junction to Rosedale West and Blakey Junction to Rosedale East. Each section had a metal token (the "staff" - actually metal rings with one, two or three links) that needed to be in the possession of the engine driver to allow them to work the line.

Just south of the incline top was Bloworth Crossing (also known variously as Blowoth, Blawith, Blowith) which had a permanently staffed crossing over an ancient trackway. Bloworth Crossing is still marked on mapping today and forms part of the Cleveland Way, the Coast to Coast, and the Lyke Wake Walk.

== Ingleby Incline ==
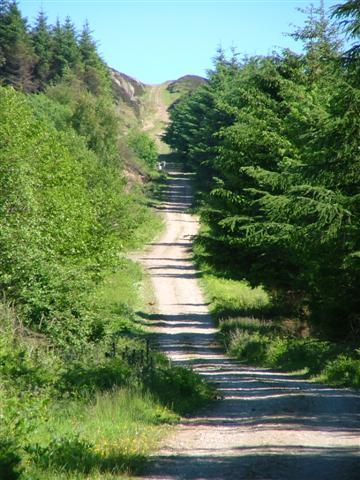
Ingleby Incline Looking Up

The incline started at 2 miles 53 chains (4.3 km) south west of Battersby railway station and rose from 650 feet (200 m) to 1,198 feet (365 m) at the incline top. It was constructed for the first narrow gauge railway in 1859/60 and took seven months to build. Varying lengths have been given for the incline, but it is thought to be 59 chains (3,900 ft; 1,200 m) in railway terms, or 3/4 mile (1.2 km). The first section of gradient was rated at 1-in-7.8, then stepping to 1-in-5.6 around the 1/4 mile (0.40 km) point, finally ascending to the incline top at a gradient of 1-in-5. A single line extended up the incline to the roughly half-way point where the track split into two to allow wagons to pass each other. The track then continued for the rest of the incline laid with three rails, the middle rail being common to both wagons ascending and descending the incline. A pointsman's cabin was located at the double track section, which would control which side that the trucks went up and down, it being varied for each iteration so that the ropes did not get crossed over. Treadles set into the line, ran bells in the brakesman's cabin by the drum house to warn of ascending wagons. This was particularly useful during night operations or in bad weather (fog).

The first drum house at the top of the incline was made of stone and contained two drums, both 14 feet (4.3 m) in diameter. The descending wagons (loaded with ore) would pull the cable around the drum and haul up the empty wagons. The wooden inserts on the drums which connected with the cables, needed replacing every five weeks due to wear, costing £20.00 each time for a new set. A fire in June 1869 destroyed the drum house, and a new building was built with the drums behind each other (the previous ones being located side by side). The newer drums were 18 feet (5.5 m) in diameter and were made of cast iron. The operation of the incline required six men; two each at the top, middle (double track section) and at the bottom. The normal mode of operation was that one loaded train would descend the incline at the same time that empty wagons were sent up. Descending trains were not usually let down without the counterbalance working; however, in 1871 it was reported that an ascending train broke free from the rope/cable hauling it up and the wagons ran backwards for 500-foot (150 m). The descending train was sent safely down the incline with braking applied to the drums.

The drum house was demolished in the early days of the Second World War, as it was believed it could be used as a landmark for enemy aircraft attacking Middlesbrough and the North East.

== Weather ==
The route across the moors was very inhospitable during winter months. Snowstorms were commonplace in winter; during 1874/5, 1882/3 and 1884/5 the snow did not thaw for at least three months. In 1895, the thaw started in March allowing the line to re-open by April, but by June, large snowdrifts were still extant on the moor tops. During a severe winter of 1916–17 the line was blocked for five weeks, when drifting snow developed into depths of 30 feet (9.1 m). An engine was buried in a drift, with the staff having to tunnel their way out of the snow. The engines on the upper line were fitted with a half-cab on the tender as a means of protection from the elements when the locomotives was required to run tender first.

== Closure and legacy ==
Because of increased costs and a fall in the price of iron, the mines closed in 1925. Operations continued for a few years extracting the valuable calcine dust from the slag heaps but traffic on the line finally ceased in 1929. The last locomotive was lowered down the incline on 8 June 1929. The loco needed to have its middle wheels removed so that it could be lowered over the crest of the incline and also to enable it to cross the bottom of the incline. The railway was declared closed three days later.

The original kilns at Rosedale West are still visible, whilst the nearby engine shed was dismantled with the stone being used for the construction of the village hall at Hutton-le-Hole, further down the valley. The incline and the trackbed from the incline to Blakey Junction is now a public bridleway, part of which is followed by the Coast to Coast Walk and the Esk Valley Walk. The whole of the trackbed of all of the railway lines can be enjoyed by walkers and cyclists, though parts of the east branch have become waterlogged and prone to subsidence. LIDAR surveying of the east line by Historic England has discovered the site of a navvy encampment around the 2-mile (3.2 km) point. This consisted of seven buildings; six of which measured 98 feet (30 m) by 23 feet (7 m) each divided into two by an internal wall, and a smaller building measuring 62 feet (19 m) by 28 feet (8.5 m).

== See also ==
- Ironstone mining in Cleveland and North Yorkshire
- British narrow gauge railways
- West Somerset Mineral Railway
