= Battersby =

Village in North Yorkshire, England

Coordinates: 54.45°N 01.09°W

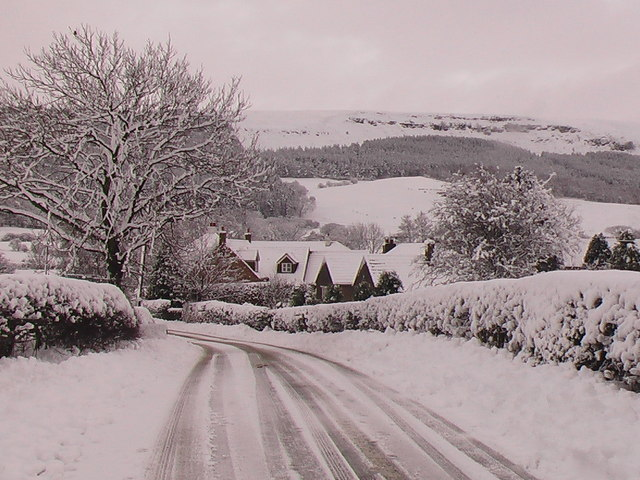
- Approaching Battersby in winter

- Location within North Yorkshire
- OS grid reference: NZ5907
- Unitary authority: North Yorkshire
- Ceremonial county: North Yorkshire
- Region: Yorkshire and the Humber
- Country: England
- Sovereign state: United Kingdom
- Post town: MIDDLESBROUGH
- Postcode district: TS9
- Police: North Yorkshire
- Fire: North Yorkshire
- Ambulance: Yorkshire
- UK Parliament: Richmond and Northallerton

Battersby is a hamlet in North Yorkshire, England. It lies on the edge of the North York Moors National Park and within the historic boundaries of the North Riding of Yorkshire, 5 miles (8 km) east of Stokesley, and 1.5 miles (2.4 km) south-west of Kildale. The settlement is mentioned in the Domesday Book as being part of the hundred of Langbaurgh, and having one ploughland. The name is recorded in 1086 as Badresbi, and in the 14th century as Batheresby. The first part is an Old Norse name (Bothvar or Boðvarr), and the by means farmstead. In the Late Middle Ages a watermill was employed on the local beck (Otter Hills Beck, and affluent of the River Leven) to grind corn.

Until 1974, the hamlet was in the North Riding of Yorkshire, part of the Stokesley Rural District, being transferred to the Hambleton District of the newer county of North Yorkshire. In 2023 the districts were abolished to be replaced by the unitary North Yorkshire Council. It is now part of the civil parish of Ingleby Greenhow, and is represented at the Houses of Parliament as part of the Richmond and Northallerton constituency.

== See also ==
- Battersby railway station
