= Potto, North Yorkshire =

Village and civil parish in North Yorkshire, England

Coordinates: 54.426°N 1.270°W

Potto
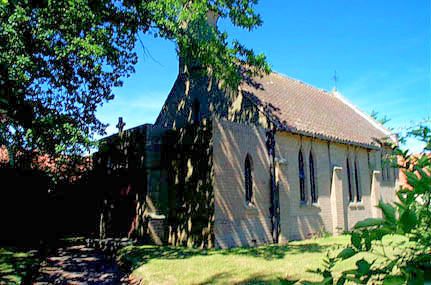
- St Mary's Church

- Location within North Yorkshire
- Population: 324 (Including Seahow. 2011 census)
- OS grid reference: NZ473036
- Civil parish: Potto
- Unitary authority: North Yorkshire
- Ceremonial county: North Yorkshire
- Region: Yorkshire and the Humber
- Country: England
- Sovereign state: United Kingdom
- Post town: NORTHALLERTON
- Postcode district: DL6
- Dialling code: 01642
- Police: North Yorkshire
- Fire: North Yorkshire
- Ambulance: Yorkshire

Potto is a village and civil parish in the county of North Yorkshire, England. It is 5 miles (8 kilometres) southwest of Stokesley and near the main A172 road. Potto has a pub, a church and a haulage company, Prestons of Potto, which was established in 1936.

From 1974 to 2023 it was part of the Hambleton District and is now administered by the unitary North Yorkshire Council.

== History ==
The name Potto derives from the Old English pott meaning pot, and the Old Norse haugr meaning 'hill/tumulus'.

The settlement of Potto can be traced to the 13th century, when it was owned by the Meynell family as part of the manor of Whorlton. Part of the estate passed to Dame Elizabeth Strangways in the 16th century and then to the Earl of Rutland. Another part, held by the original de Potto family and awarded to various land owners by royal grant, was merged into the Whorlton estate of the Marquess of Ailesbury.

In the 19th century the village was connected by a rail freight line from Swainby to serve the ironstone and jet mines in the area. Potto had a passenger station on the Picton–Battersby line, but its remoteness from the village and the introduction of buses that could take roads direct to Middlesbrough led to its closure in 1954. The former station was bought by Richard Preston Snr, whose son used it for his haulage company, Prestons of Potto. It is now a private dwelling.

In the mid-to-late 1950s the village became known as the village with "the pub that never opened". If a person wanted to enter, the owner looked through the window to see if you were respectable. After his death the pub and contents were sold.

== Geography ==
Located close to the western border of North York Moors National Park, the surrounding villages are Swainby to the south, Hutton Rudby and Rudby to the north and Faceby and Carlton in Cleveland to the east. It is 11.5 miles (19 km) from Northallerton and 14 miles (23 km) from Middlesbrough and Stockton-on-Tees.

== See also ==
- Civil parishes in North Yorkshire
- Listed buildings in Potto, North Yorkshire
