= Battersby railway station =

Railway station in North Yorkshire, England

Battersby
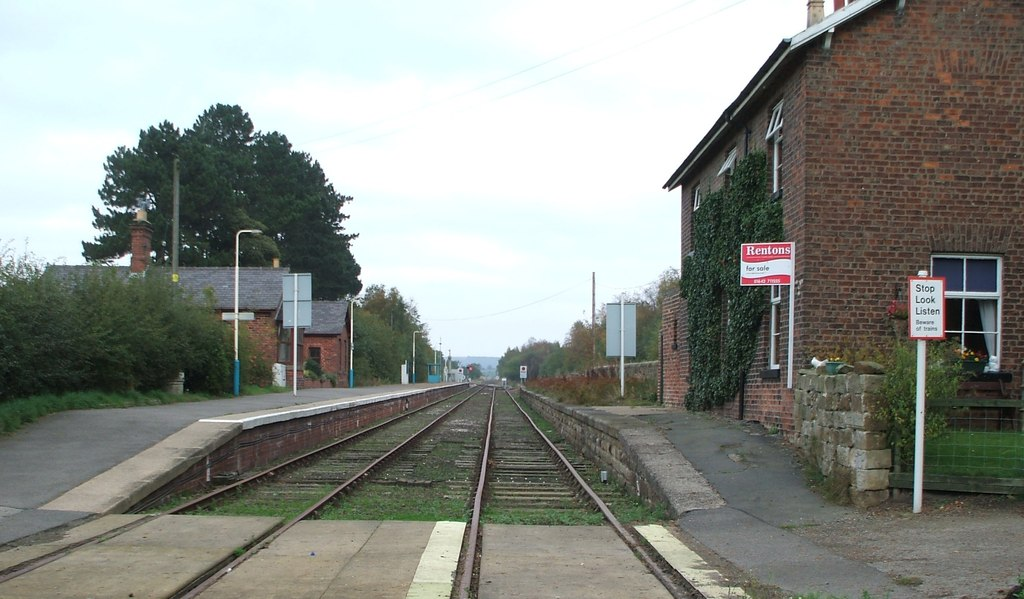
- The station seen in 2007, looking outbound to Middlesbrough and Whitby

General information
- Location: Battersby, North Yorkshire; England
- Coordinates: 54°27′26″N 1°05′37″W
- Grid reference: NZ588072
- Owner: Network Rail
- Manager: Northern Trains
- Platforms: 2 (1 in use)
- Tracks: 2

Other information
- Station code: BTT
- Classification: DfT category F2

History
- Original company: North Eastern Railway
- Pre-grouping: North Eastern Railway
- Post-grouping: London and North Eastern Railway; British Rail (North Eastern Region)

Key dates
- 1 April 1858: Opened as Ingleby Junction
- 30 September 1878: Renamed Battersby Junction
- 1 May 1893: Renamed Battersby

Passengers
- 2021/22: ▲2,736
- 2022/23: ▼2,164
- 2023/24: ▲2,268
- 2024/25: ▲2,524
- 2025/26: ▲3,142
Location
- Location within North Yorkshire
Notes
- Passenger statistics from the Office of Rail and Road

Battersby is a railway station on the Esk Valley Line, which runs between Middlesbrough and Whitby via Nunthorpe. The station, situated 10 miles 61 chains (17.3 km) Guisborough Junction, near Middlesbrough, serves the village of Battersby in North Yorkshire, England. It is owned by Network Rail and managed by Northern Trains, and is located between Great Ayton and Kildale.

== History ==
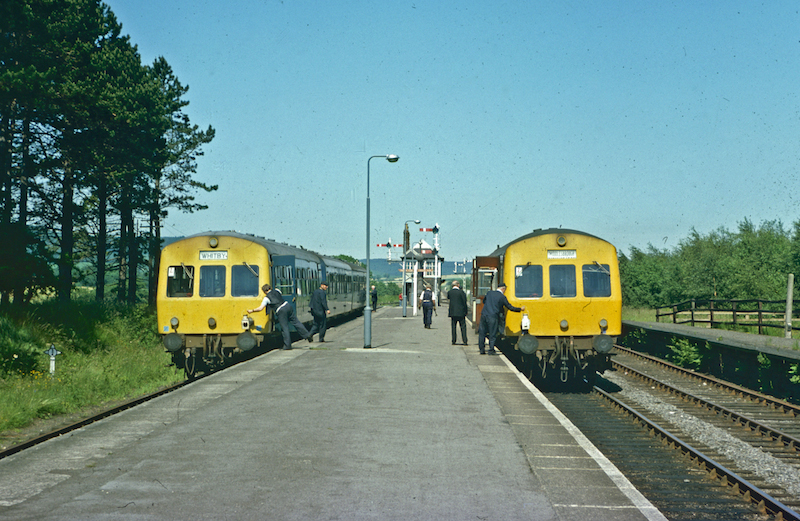
The station in 1977

In its early years Battersby was known as Ingleby Junction, and opened for goods traffic on the Picton to Grosmont line in 1858 when the Ingleby Mining company's private line (the Rosedale Railway) first linked to the North Yorkshire & Cleveland Railway. The station was opened to passenger traffic in April 1861. It was renamed to Battersby Junction in 1878 to avoid confusion with Ingleby station, on the Picton Branch, which ran from Battersby to the main line at Picton. The station was simplified to "Battersby" in 1893 (The NER had a dislike of "Junction" suffixes and removed most of them). Despite being located along single track routes, Battersby became a major hub with extensive marshalling sidings and three-road engine shed with turntable. Two terraces with 30 cottages along with two houses were built and still stand today.

Battersby used to have three platforms: two long through platforms connected by a central footbridge and a shorter bay platform with a run-round loop. Water towers were located at both ends of the station; however, only the one at the current "junction end" remains today. The signal box located here was closed in 1989, but traces of the third platform are still visible and a run-round loop is available which is controlled by a ground frame. Diesels took over regular passenger services from steam trains in 1958.

The station building is now a family home.

== Layout ==
Track layout at Battersby

Battersby is unusual on the British railway network, due to the layout of the tracks. Formerly the place where the branch from Middlesbrough joined the through route from Whitby to Picton (on the Stockton to Northallerton portion of the former Leeds Northern Railway), the closure of the direct line west of Battersby in 1954 means that all services have to reverse in the station. Until the rationalisation of the signalling in 1989 it was common for two trains to do so at the same time, in order to pass each other on the single track Esk Valley line. Trains can still pass each other in the one remaining platform, using the "first in, last out" principle, as the platform line is signalled to permit two trains to occupy it at once.

== Facilities ==
The station has a ticket machine, a waiting shelter, public address (for live and recorded announcements), and a customer information screen.

The station is step free to access but you do have to cross over a level crossing to reach the platform.

== Passenger volume ==
Passenger volume at Battersby
	2004–05	2005–06	2006–07	2007–08	2008–09	2009–10	2010–11	2011–12	2012–13	2013–14	2014–15	2015–16	2016–17	2017–18	2018–19	2019–20	2020–21	2021–22	2022–23	2023–24	2024–25
Entries and exits	1,591	1,653	1,711	2,028	1,806	2,012	1,476	1,504	1,574	1,592	1,488	1,458	1,660	1,564	1,520	1,760	396	2,736	2,164	2,268	2,524

The statistics cover twelve month periods that start in April.

== Services ==
As of the May 2026 timetable change, the station is served by six trains per day towards Whitby on weekdays and Saturdays, and four trains on Sunday. In the opposite direction, the same number run to Middlesbrough via Nunthorpe. All services are operated by Northern Trains, using Class 156 and Class 158 trains.

Preceding station	National Rail	Following station
Great Ayton	Northern Trains; Esk Valley Line	Kildale
	Disused railways	
Ingleby	North Eastern Railway; Picton and Battersby Line	Terminus

== Future proposals ==
Plans to either re-instate another platform at Battersby, or build a chord that avoids Battersby station altogether have been proposed.

== Community rail ==
The station, along with all other stations between Middlesbrough and Whitby, is part of the Esk Valley Railway Development Company, a Community Rail partnership.

== See also ==
- Rosedale Railway
