= Northallerton–Eaglescliffe line =

Railway line in England

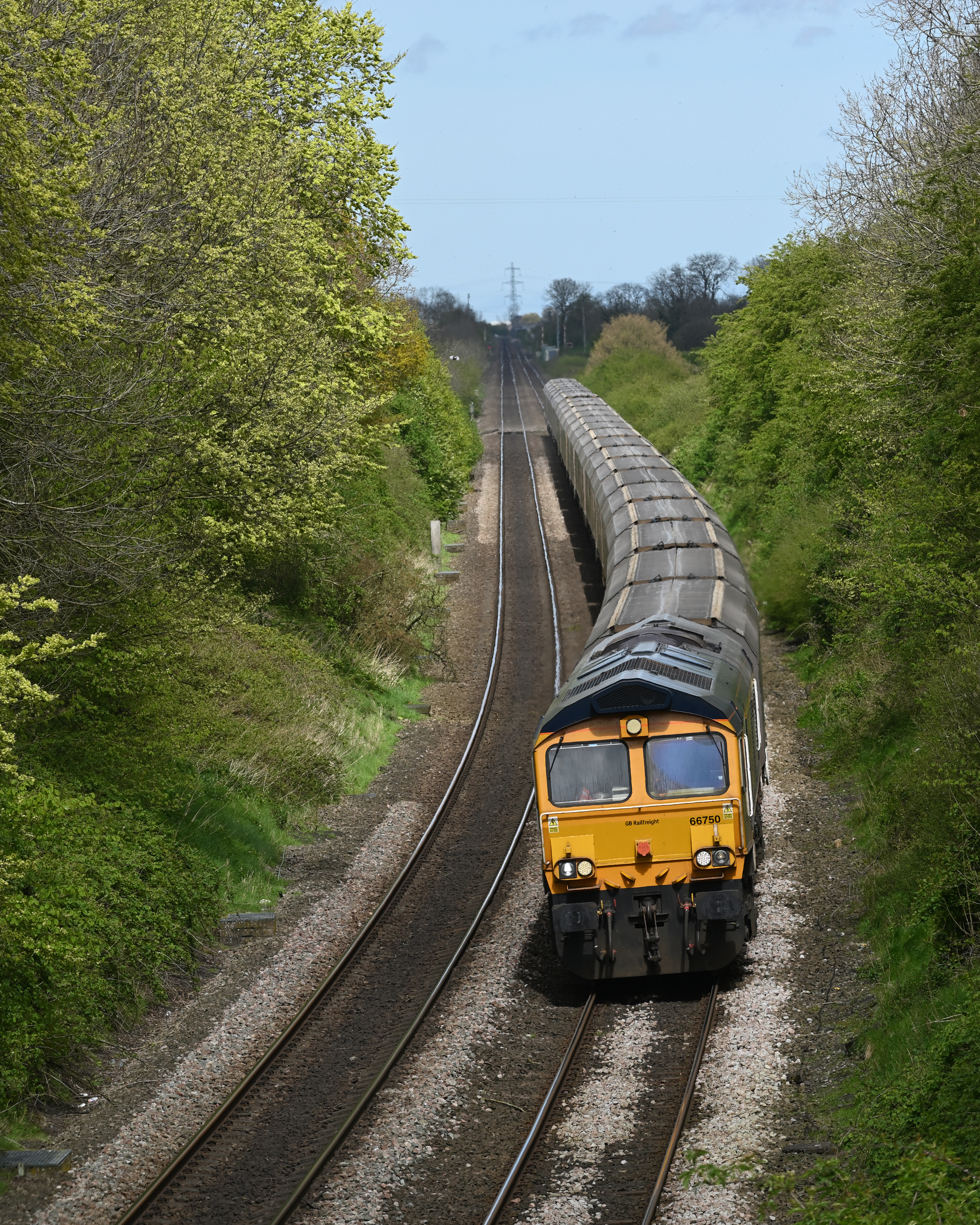
- Biomass train between Picton and Brompton

Overview
- Owner: National Rail
- Locale: North Yorkshire; County Durham

Service
- System: National Rail

History
- Opened: 2 June 1852

Technical
- Track gauge: 4 ft 8 1/2 in (1,435 mm)
- Operating speed: 70 mph (113 km/h)
Route map
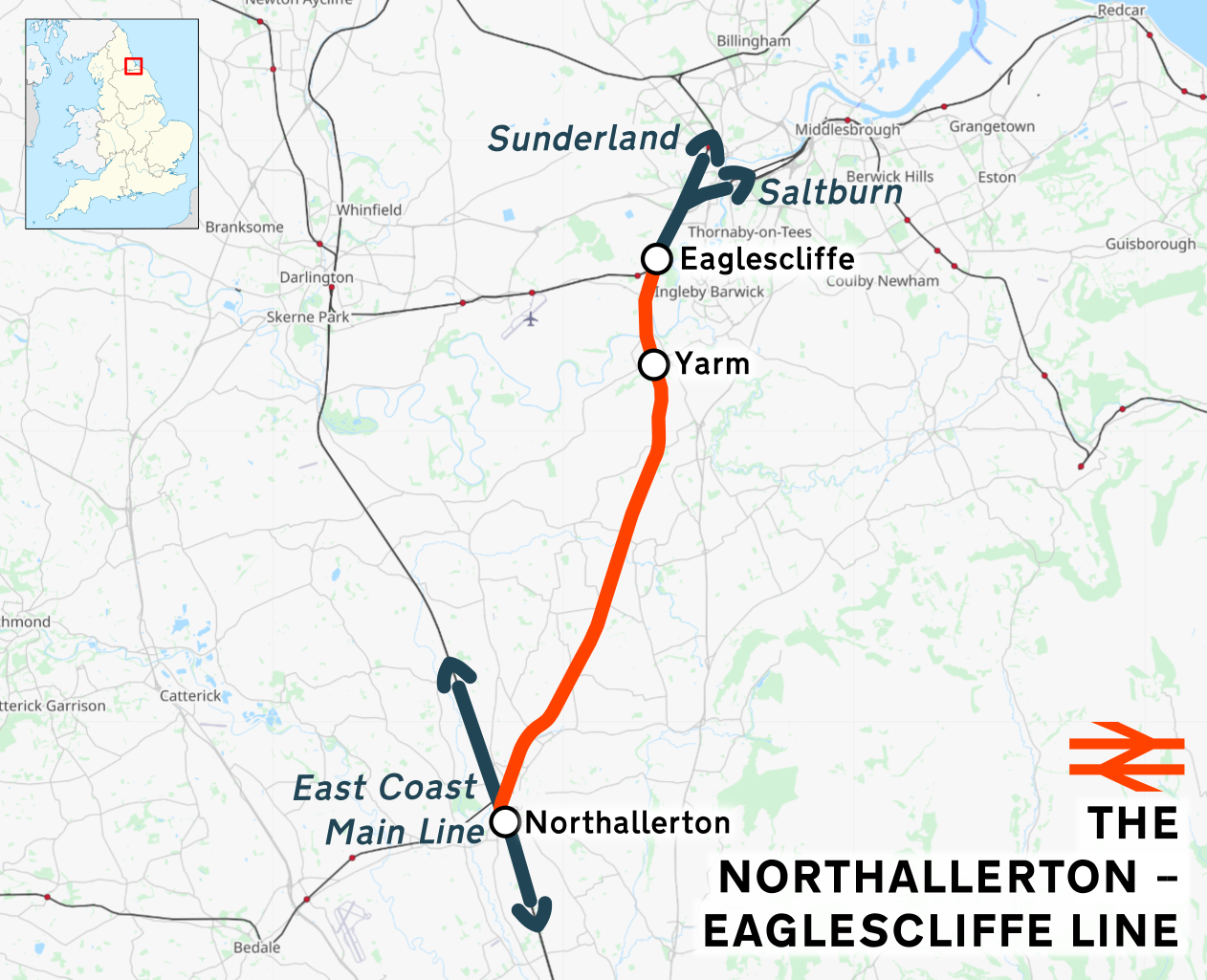
(Click to expand)

The Northallerton–Eaglescliffe line runs between Northallerton and Eaglescliffe stations. It connects the East Coast Main Line to the Tees Valley Line. It was built by the Leeds Northern Railway as part of their main line from Leeds to Stockton (via Harrogate and Ripon) which opened on 2 June 1852, although the connection to the ECML at the Northallerton end was not opened for a further four years.

== Stations ==
=== Open ===
The current stations on the line are:

- Northallerton
- Yarm
- Eaglescliffe

=== Closed ===
A number of stations that used to serve towns and villages on the line were closed between 1954 and the end of local passenger services over the route on 6 September 1965, with those at Picton railway station, Yarm railway station and Brompton being the last to go. The station at Yarm was subsequently reopened by Regional Railways North East in February 1996.

== Services ==
Most services are run by TransPennine Express between Manchester Airport and Middlesbrough. Services are roughly hourly and call at all stations as part of the North TransPennine route. A further five trains a day in each direction (as of December 2021) by Grand Central serve Northallerton and Eaglescliffe as part of the route between Sunderland and London King's Cross.

The lines also sees use by a variety of heavy freight services to/from Teesside, including petroleum from Port Clarence, steel trains to and from Hartlepool, Scunthorpe and Aldwarke, the Freightliner terminal at Teesport and waste traffic to Wilton EFW.

The line is also part of a diversionary route to Newcastle using the Durham Coast Line when the East Coast Main Line route via Darlington and Durham Is closed.

== Proposals ==
In early 2026, the Tees Valley Combined Authority awarded Network rail £800,000 to create a business case for electrifying the line throughout and beyond to Middlesbrough and Saltburn. This was on the back of the Trans-Pennine Route Upgrade (TRU) which would mean electric trains would be able to cross the Pennines using electricity throughout, but either have to be a bi-modal train, or completely diesel, to use the line from Northallerton northwards.

== Accidents and incidents ==
- 27 July 1963 – a freight train ran through a red signal in the early hours of the morning and collided with a slower moving freight train in the same section of line. The guard of the front train was crushed in his brake van and died of his injuries at the scene. The inquiry determined that the driver of the rear train had most likely fallen asleep.
- 11 July 2025 – a freight trains struck a vehicle on the level crossing at West Rounton Gates. The impact of the collision showered debris including one of the level crossing barriers into the gardens of nearby homes. The driver of the road vehicle died at the scene.
