= Eaglescliffe railway station =

Railway station in County Durham, England

Eaglescliffe
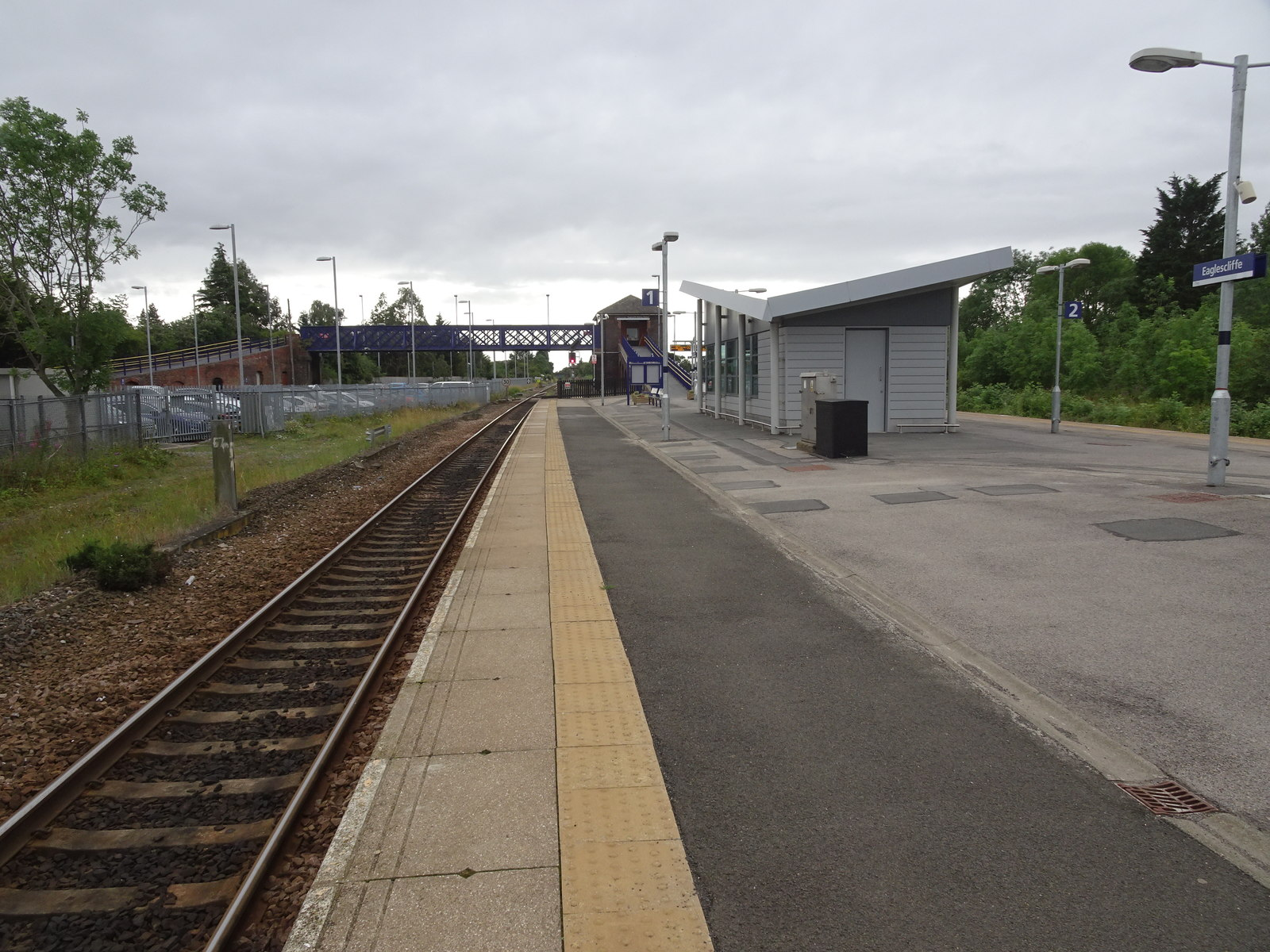

General information
- Location: Eaglescliffe, Borough of Stockton-on-Tees; England
- Coordinates: 54°31′48″N 1°20′59″W
- Grid reference: NZ421150
- Owner: Network Rail
- Manager: Northern Trains
- Platforms: 2
- Tracks: 2

Other information
- Station code: EAG
- Classification: DfT category F1

History
- Original company: Leeds Northern Railway
- Pre-grouping: North Eastern Railway
- Post-grouping: London and North Eastern Railway; British Rail (North Eastern Region)

Key dates
- 25 March 1852: Opened as Eaglescliffe
- 1852/1853: Renamed Eaglescliffe Junction
- 1854: Renamed Preston Junction
- 1 February 1878: Renamed Eaglescliffe Junction

Passengers
- 2021/22: ▲0.144 million
- 2022/23: ▲0.200 million
- 2023/24: ▲0.214 million
- 2024/25: ▼0.212 million
- 2025/26: ▲0.250 million
Location
- Location within County Durham
Notes
- Passenger statistics from the Office of Rail and Road

Eaglescliffe is a railway station on the Tees Valley Line, which runs between Bishop Auckland and Saltburn via Darlington. The station, situated 8 miles 63 chains (8.79 mi; 14.1 km) east of Darlington, serves the village of Eaglescliffe, Borough of Stockton-on-Tees in County Durham, England. It is owned by Network Rail and managed by Northern Trains.

== History ==
=== Before the station ===
The previous line ran on the east side of Yarm Road, through the grounds of Preston Hall. It is said that Lord Preston (Marshall Robinson Fowler) was unhappy the disruption that trains, such as Locomotion No. 1, caused to his cattle and had insisted that it was moved west of the road when the Stockton and Darlington Railway re-aligned their line.

The railway station serving the parishes of Preston-on-Tees and Egglescliffe, was known as Preston. Displeased at the cost of moving the station, the railway owners decided to name the new station after Egglescliffe (ultimately using a different spelling) instead.

=== Opening ===
The station was opened by the Leeds Northern Railway on 25 May 1852, with their line from Melmerby to Stockton. That line deviates from the original alignment of the Stockton and Darlington Railway. The station became known as Eaglescliffe Junction, as passengers could change between services on the two respective lines. Originally the station had four platforms: the westernmost platforms were taken out of use in the late 1960s and since been removed.

=== Misspelling ===
There are various stories as to how the station got the name Eaglescliffe, instead of the intended, Egglescliffe. One such set of stories is that the signwriter was sent a telegram with a misspelling to paint the sign as Eaglescliffe. Another variant was that the signwriter thought to change it, after believing it to be incorrect. In each variation, it is said that the sign was not changed for a period of time, by which time the name had been adopted. In the following years the surrounding area came to be known interchangeably as Eaglescliffe (on road signs) or Egglescliffe (often referring to the original village or in building names).

=== Tees Valley Metro ===
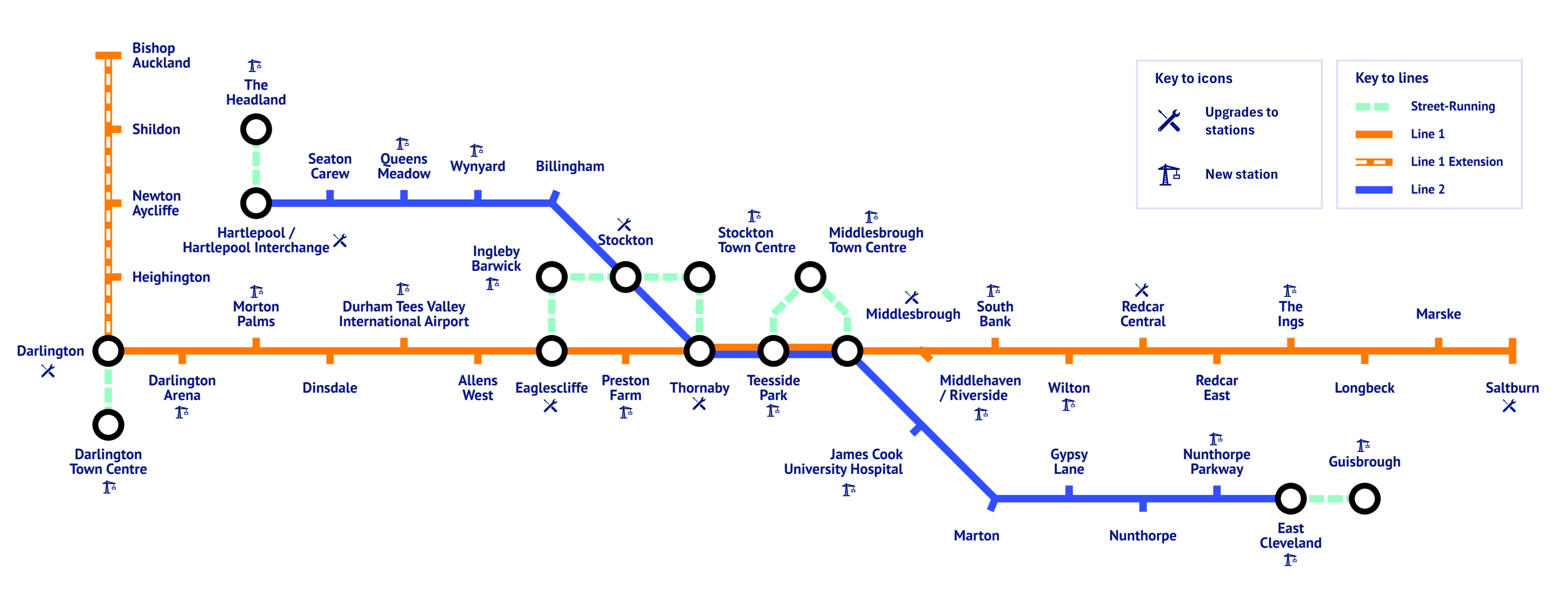
Transit diagram showcasing all discussed or mentioned ideas for the Tees Valley Metro.

Starting in 2006, Eaglescliffe was mentioned within the Tees Valley Metro scheme. This was a plan to upgrade the Tees Valley Line and sections of the Esk Valley Line and Durham Coast Line to provide a faster and more frequent service across the North East of England. In the initial phases the services would have been heavy rail mostly along existing alignments with new additional infrastructure and rollingstock. The later phase would have introduced tram-trains to allow street running and further heavy rail extensions.

As part of the scheme, Eaglescliffe station would have received improved service to Darlington and Saltburn (1–2 to 4 trains per hour) and new rollingstock. The station would also have received a new ticket office, waiting facility, outdoor shelters, electronic information displays, and possible extension to the car park (Improvements eventually occurred after cancellation, with plans for the new footbridge starting in 2024). While speculative, there was further talk about additional stations being added in the area such as a Preston Farm station, and street-running trams to Ingleby Barwick, which may have impacted Eaglescliffe.

However, due to a change in government in 2010 and the 2008 financial crisis, the project was ultimately shelved. Several stations eventually got their improvements and there is a possibility of improved rolling stock and services in the future which may affect Eaglescliffe.

== Facilities ==
The station's facilities have been recently upgraded during the early and mid–2010s, with improvements including the installation of real-time information screens and CCTV, as well as renewed station signage.

In January 2012, construction work started on a new ticket office at the station. In April 2015, the station's previous waiting shelters were replaced by a modern waiting room.

The station has been staffed since 2012. Initially, the ticket office was operated by an independent company, Chester-le-Track, which also operated the station at Chester-le-Street. Chester-le-Track ceased trading on 31 March 2018, and the booking office was subsequently closed.

The ticket office was later re-opened on 3 April 2018, and is now managed by Northern Trains, with staff provided by Grand Central.

There is step-free access to the island platform via the ramped footbridge from the car park and station entrance.

In May 2024, improvements to Eaglescliffe Station started, with a new footbridge connecting to the west side as well as the existing footbridge and ramps refurbished, with new waiting areas and taxi office being added as part of the project.

On 29 June 2026, an enlarged ticket office, a new overbridge with lifts and a new car park were opened as part of a £14.5 million project to improve the station's facilities.

== Services ==
=== Grand Central ===
Grand Central serves the station with 6 trains per day (5 on a Sunday) between Sunderland and London Kings Cross via Seaham, Hartlepool, Northallerton, Thirsk and York. One train per day calls at Peterborough.

=== Northern Trains ===
Northern Trains serves the station with an hourly service between Saltburn and Bishop Auckland and an hourly service between Saltburn and Darlington. Three trains per day extend to Newcastle via Durham (with two continuing to Carlisle) and two trains per day to Nunthorpe. One late night service terminates at Middlesbrough.

On Sundays, the station is served by an hourly service between Saltburn and Bishop Auckland. One train per day operates between Darlington and Whitby via Nunthorpe. Two trains per day operate between Darlington and Hartlepool via Stockton.

=== TransPennine Express ===
From the December 2024 timetable change TransPennine Express operates an hourly service between Redcar Central and Manchester Airport via Yarm. Two trains per day extend to terminate at Saltburn.

Preceding station	National Rail	Following station
Thornaby	TransPennine Express; North TransPennine	Yarm
Thornaby	Northern Trains; Tees Valley line	Allens West
Hartlepool	Grand Central; North Eastern	Northallerton

== Sources ==
- Body, G. (1988), PSL Field Guides - Railways of the Eastern Region Volume 2, Patrick Stephens Ltd, Wellingborough, ISBN 1-85260-072-1
- Quick, Michael (2022) [2001]. Railway passenger stations in Great Britain: a chronology (PDF). version 5.04. Railway & Canal Historical Society. Archived from the original (PDF) on 25 November 2022.
