= Picton–Battersby line =

Former railway in England

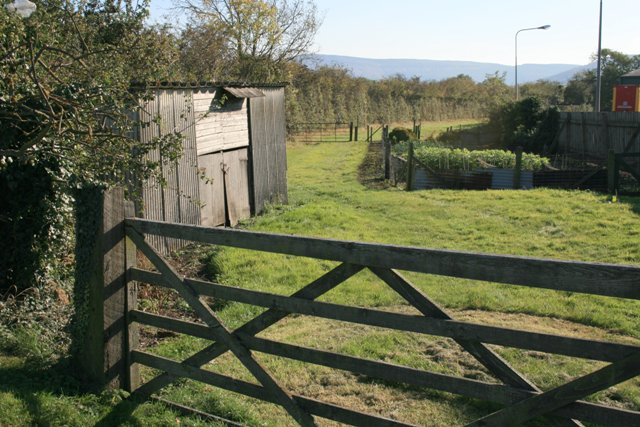
- Looking south east from the former Potto railway station onto the formation of the Whorlton branch

Overview
- Status: Closed
- Locale: North Yorkshire
- Termini: Picton; Battersby
- Stations: 7

Service
- Type: Heavy Rail
- Operator(s): North Yorkshire and Cleveland Railway; North Eastern Railway; London North Eastern Railway; British Rail

History
- Opened: March 1857 to Stokesley; April 1858 to Kildale
- Closed: June 1954 to passengers August 1965 completely

Technical
- Line length: 12.5 miles (20.1 km)
- Number of tracks: 1 as built, later dualled
- Track gauge: 4 ft 8 1/2 in (1,435 mm)

The Picton–Battersby line was a railway line running from Picton, North Yorkshire, England, on what is now the Northallerton–Eaglescliffe line, to Battersby on what is now the Esk Valley line.

== History ==
=== Construction ===
North Yorkshire and Cleveland Railway Act 1854
- Act of Parliament
- Parliament of the United Kingdom
- Long title: An Act to incorporate a Company for making a Railway from near the Picton Station on the Leeds Northern Railway to near the Grosmont Station on the Whitby and Pickering Branch of the York and North Midland Railway, and for other Purposes.
- Citation: 17 & 18 Vict. c. cli

Dates
- Royal assent: 10 July 1854

Other legislation
- Amended by: North Yorkshire and Cleveland Railway Act 1855

Text of statute as originally enacted

North Yorkshire and Cleveland Railway Act 1855
- Act of Parliament
- Parliament of the United Kingdom
- Long title: An Act to enable the North Yorkshire and Cleveland Railway Company to make a Branch from their Railway to the Middlesbrough and Guisbrough Railway, and also a Branch to Whorlton, and other Works; and to alter and amend the Act relating to the said Company; and for other Purposes.
- Citation: 18 & 19 Vict. c. cxvi

Dates
- Royal assent: 2 July 1855

Other legislation
- Amends: North Yorkshire and Cleveland Railway Act 1854

Text of statute as originally enacted

North Yorkshire and Cleveland Railway Act 1858
- Act of Parliament
- Parliament of the United Kingdom
- Long title: An Act to enable the North Yorkshire and Cleveland Railway Company to construct a new Branch from their Railway; to make a Deviation in the Main Line and other Works; to alter and amend the Acts relating to the Company; and for other Purposes.
- Citation: 21 & 22 Vict. c. cxxxiv

Dates
- Royal assent: 23 July 1858

The line was authorised by the North Yorkshire and Cleveland Railway Act 1854 (17 & 18 Vict. c. cli) and constructed by the North Yorkshire and Cleveland Railway (NY&CR) between Picton (on the Leeds Northern's 1852 route between Northallerton and Stockton) and Grosmont. It was opened in 1857 from Picton to Stokesley, with intermediate stations at Trenholme Bar, Potto and Sexhow. The line included a two-mile branch south from Potto to the mines at Whorlton.

The NY&CR was incorporated into the North Eastern Railway (NER) by the North Eastern Railway (Bedale and Leyburn and Rosedale Railways Amalgamation) Act 1859 (22 & 23 Vict. c. xci), the same year the Rosedale Branch Line for the Rosedale mines was purchased from private owners and began conversion from narrow gauge to standard gauge. It was left to NER to finish the line to Grosmont via Battersby. This and the link line to Nunthorpe were completed in stages to 1865.

=== Stations ===
There were seven stations on the Picton to Battersby section of the NY&C.

- Picton

Picton is the station at which the line met the Leeds Northern's route between Northallerton and Stockton, which is now the Northallerton–Eaglescliffe line. The station closed in 1960, but the stationmaster's house still survives.

- Trenholme Bar

One of the original stations upon opening in 1857, the station closed along with passenger traffic in 1954. The station was situated on a level crossing with the old A19 single carriageway. The stationmaster's house survives but most of the site was taken up by the A19 dual carriageway upgrade in the early 1970s.

- Potto

Serving the village of Potto, the station was open from 1857 to 1954. It was the last station before the branch to Whorlton mines, receiving two daily shipments of ironstone. The station building survives as a private residence and business premises.

- Sexhow

Served the village of Sexhow from 1857 to 1954. The station building survives.

- Stokesley

The last of the original stations opened in 1857, Stokesley closed in 1954 along with the rest of the passenger traffic. Closed to freight in 1965. The station building survives, after being well restored by a firm of architects. Stokesley station featured comprehensively in the BTF production "A farmer moves south" and is therefore one of the best documented of the closed rural stations.

- Ingleby

This station served the village of Ingleby Greenhow from 1858 to 1954. The station building remains.

- Battersby

Originally called Ingleby Junction in 1858, then Battersby Junction from 1878, before finally becoming Battersby in 1893, the station is the only one on the line to remain in use, as part of the Esk Valley line.

== Whorlton branch ==
A 2 miles (3.2 km) branch to the ironstone mines at Ailesbury and Swainby left the line southwards after Potto station. This was opened with the initial section of the line and forwarded two ironstone trains per day to the furnaces on Teesside. The mines were exhausted in 1887 and the branch was closed in 1892.

== Closure ==
When the freight from the mines ceased, the passenger services along the Picton–Battersby and Esk Valley lines still remained important to the region, despite competition along the coast lines, with seven weekday trains along the line between Teesside and Whitby in 1900. However, this dropped to four in 1922 and by 1954 it was only two. Passenger services were withdrawn on 14 June 1954, with goods traffic ending west of Stokesley in 1958. Freight traffic remained between Stokesley and Battersby until 1965, when it too ceased, and the line dropped completely out of use.

Battersby station (originally Ingleby Junction, later Battersby Junction in 1878, and its current name from 1893) and the line to Grosmont remain as part of the Esk Valley line.
