= Northallerton railway station =

Railway station in North Yorkshire on the East Coast Main Line

Northallerton
- A TransPennine Express Class 802 (right) passing a Grand Central Class 180 at Northallerton in June 2026

General information
- Location: Northallerton, North Yorkshire; England
- Coordinates: 54°19′57″N 1°26′29″W
- Grid reference: SE364931
- Owner: Network Rail
- Manager: TransPennine Express
- Platforms: 2

Other information
- Station code: NTR
- Classification: DfT category D

History
- Original company: Great North of England Railway
- Pre-grouping: North Eastern Railway
- Post-grouping: London and North Eastern Railway; British Rail (Eastern Region)

Key dates
- 31 March 1841: Opened

Passengers
- 2021/22: ▲0.681 million
- 2022/23: ▼0.620 million
- 2023/24: ▲0.661 million
- 2024/25: ▲0.798 million
- 2025/26: ▲0.819 million
Location
Notes
- Passenger statistics from the Office of Rail and Road

Northallerton railway station is on the East Coast Main Line (ECML) serving the market town of Northallerton in North Yorkshire, England. It is between Thirsk to the south and Darlington to the north. It is also a junction, with the line to Eaglescliffe and Middlesbrough diverging from the ECML. Its three-letter station code is NTR. The station is managed by TransPennine Express and also served by Grand Central and London North Eastern Railway trains. It is on one of the fastest parts of the ECML, and London North Eastern Railway, Lumo and CrossCountry express services pass through the station at speeds of up to 125 mph (200 km/h).

== History ==
Northallerton station was opened on 30 March 1841 by the Great North of England Railway, and the York Herald described it as "in the Elizabethan Gothic style". Although much remodelled, the station is in the same location, with staggered platforms as when first built. In 1842, the GNE was absorbed into the Newcastle and Darlington Junction Railway (N&DJR), who gained approval in the Great North of England and Bedale Branch Railway Act 1846 (9 & 10 Vict. c. xcvi) for a line between Northallerton and Bedale, which was completed in March 1848. Various other schemes progressed the line through Wensleydale and the N&DJR became part of the York, Newcastle and Berwick Railway (YN&BR) in 1847, although this company was short-lived and was incorporated into the North Eastern Railway in 1854. The Wensleydale line left Northallerton westwards and had two connections with the mainline north of Northallerton; one at Castle Hills South and the other at Castle Hills North.

The third line was the Leeds Northern Railway (LNR), previously the Leeds & Thirsk Railway, whose line opened in June 1852, and paralleled the YN&BR line at a lower level to the west on its way from Eaglescliffe through Northallerton to Ripon and Harrogate. The LNR line passed under the YN&BR line just north of Northallerton station via a short tunnel. The LNR opened two platforms on its line adjacent to Northallerton station. Access to these "Low-Level" platforms was via a path from the main station's "High-Level" platforms. A door in the subway under the main running lines allowed passengers to interconnect between all platforms. The Low-Level platforms were the terminus for local trains from Melmerby (via Sinderby) until 1901, when the line from Melmerby was doubled and became the key line north; the NER installed a junction at Cordio Wood to feed a spur into the south of the station. The Low-Level platforms thus became redundant and were abandoned, but were later resurrected for use during the Second World War and for engineering diversions. The line itself still exists, and is still used for freight trains travelling from the south towards Eaglescliffe and vice-versa, which can therefore avoid the station.

In 1911, the station was remodelled when an improved connection was installed on the western side for access to the Wensleydale line. The down platform (Darlington-bound) was converted into an island platform with two running lines and a north-facing bay for Wensleydale services. Another bay was installed on the up platform (York-bound) which allowed services to depart south for the Ripon line, although the stopping service until 1901 had used the low platforms. In 1923 the NER was amalgamated into the London and North Eastern Railway by the Railways Act 1921 and the station would remain under its control until the creation of British Railways in 1947.

When the passenger service ended on the Wensleydale line in April 1954, the direct curve from the station onto the line was used less until it closed in 1970. The last section of line to be closed, the Leeds Northern Line from Harrogate and Ripon, closed to passengers in 1967 but was not closed completely until 1969. With the loss of the local and long-distance traffic on the Wensleydale and Harrogate lines, the bay platforms at the southern and northern ends of the station were taken out of commission. The northbound platform buildings were removed in 1972–1973 and the southbound side lost its glass canopies in 1985. The station was remodelled between 1985 and 1986 with the line on the western edge of the station (the "down relief line") also being removed.

The ECML was electrified with the 25kV AC electrification system in 1991. The section between York and Northallerton was energised and tested in September 1990, although electric services between London King's Cross and Edinburgh did not commence until July 1991. Electrification involved raising many bridges and spelled the end for Northallerton signalbox, which had opened in September 1939 and controlled a large section of the ECML. The signalbox closed in April 1990 when control was transferred to York IECC. However, the control of the barriers at Low Gates level crossing and some other local level crossings remains under the authority of the signalbox at Low Gates in the north of the town. In 2017, a platform in the station was lengthened to enable the new Class 800 trains to call on East Coast services.

=== Accidents and incidents ===
On 29 December 1870, the boiler of a locomotive waiting to leave with a service to Bedale exploded in the station. Two North Eastern Railway employees were hurt by flying debris, and the accident report notes that "portions of the plate and engine were projected to great distances, and dealt much destruction to property at and in the neighbourhood of the station".

On 28 August 1979, a Kings Cross to Edinburgh service was derailed just south of the station. The train completely left the tracks, but stayed upright and came to a halt 1,800 feet (550 m) north of where it hit the trailing points that caused the derailment; the leading power car of the InterCity 125 train had suffered a seized front axle because of a gearbox failure caused by confusion over maintenance schedules, which caused damage to a wheelset which then derailed on the points. Although there were over 440 people on the train, only one person was kept in hospital overnight.

== Future plans ==
In plans published in 2020, Network Rail unveiled a proposal to provide two fast lines through the station and to move both platforms outwards with new loops. There are other possible variations including the installation of a grade-separated junction north of the station, to allow trains to access the Middlesbrough line without conflicting with trains heading south, and even a proposal to move the station south of the town so that it can be furnished with platforms that have access to all lines.

== Facilities ==
Northallerton station main entrance in 2026.

The station is staffed, its ticket hall opens from 05:30 until 18:30 each day (except Sundays, when it opens at 09:00). Self-service ticket machines are also available for the purchase and collection of tickets. Toilets are provided on the concourse, along with heated waiting rooms on both platforms. Train running information is offered via digital CIS displays, timetable posters, customer help points and automated announcements. There is a car park with spaces for 272 vehicles.

The station formerly had step-free access to both platforms via ramps from a subway, however, some wheelchair users struggled with the steepness of the ramps so in May 2021, work began on a project to replace the ramps with lifts. The project was completed at the end of March 2022.

== Services ==
Class 801 "Azuma" No.801226 in Pride Together livery departs with a King's Cross to Edinburgh service in November 2024.

The station is operated by TransPennine Express (TPE); the company serves Northallerton with one train an hour each way during the daytime. In the southbound direction, trains generally run to Manchester Airport via York, Leeds and Huddersfield and northbound, there is one train per hour to Redcar Central via Middlesbrough; three of these services are extended to or from Saltburn. In the early morning and late evening some services from Liverpool Lime Street to Newcastle call at the station, together with a single late night service from Newcastle to York.

London North Eastern Railway (LNER) serves the station with trains between London King's Cross and Newcastle; these call at Northallerton on an hourly basis seven days per week. On a Sunday, a few of these services terminate or originate from Edinburgh.

All Grand Central services between London King's Cross and Sunderland call at the station, with 6 trains per day in each direction (5 per day on a Sunday).

| Preceding station | National Rail | Following station |
|---|---|---|
| York | London North Eastern Railway; London–Newcastle/Edinburgh | Darlington |
| York | TransPennine Express North TransPennine | Darlington |
| Thirsk | TransPennine Express North TransPennine | Yarm |
| Thirsk | Grand Central London–Sunderland | Eaglescliffe |
Historical railways
| Ainderby; Line and station closed | North Eastern Railway; Hawes–Northallerton line | Terminus |
| Terminus | North Eastern Railway; Leeds–Northallerton railway | Newby Wiske; Line and station closed |
| Terminus | North Eastern Railway; Northallerton–Eaglescliffe line | Brompton; Line open; station closed |
| Otterington; Line open; station closed | North Eastern Railway; East Coast Main Line | Danby Wiske; Line open; station closed |

== See also ==
- Railways in Northallerton

== Sources ==
- Allen, Cecil J. (1974) [1964]. The North Eastern Railway. Ian Allan. ISBN 0-7110-0495-1.
- Body, Geoffrey (1989). Railways of the North Eastern Region; Vol 2, Northern Operating Area. Wellingborough: Patrick Stephens. ISBN 1-85260-072-1.
- Burgess, Neil (2011). The Lost Railways of Yorkshire's North Riding. Catrine: Stenlake. ISBN 978-1-840335-55-2.
- Chapman, Stephen (2010). Railway Memories No. 23; Northallerton, Ripon & Wensleydale. Todmorden: Bellcode Books. ISBN 978-1-871233-23-0.
- Chrystal, Paul; Sunderland, Mark (2010). Northallerton through time. Stroud: Amberley. ISBN 978-1-848681-81-1.
- Cobb, M.H. (2003). The railways of Great Britain : a historical atlas at a scale of 1 inch to 1 mile vol. 2 (2 ed.). Shepperton: Ian Allan Publishing. ISBN 0-7110-3003-0.
- Cobb, M.H. (2005). Railways of the Yorkshire Dales. Ilkley: Great Northern Books. p. 61. ISBN 1-905080-03-4.
- Goode, C.T. (1980). The Wensleydale branch. Trowbridge: Oakwood Press. p. 11. ISBN 0-85361-265-X.
- Haigh, Alan; Joy, David (1979). Yorkshire Railways. Clapham: Dalesman Books. ISBN 0-85206-553-1.
- Hoole, Ken (1974). A Regional History of the Railways of Great Britain. Vol. 4: The North East. Newton Abbot: David & Charles. ISBN 0-7153-6439-1.
- Hoole, Ken (1977). Railways in the Yorkshire Dales. Clapham: Dalesman Books. ISBN 0-85206-418-7.
- Hoole, Ken (1983). Trains in Trouble: Vol. 4. Redruth: Atlantic Books. p. 30. ISBN 0-906899-07-9.
- Hoole, Ken (1985). Railways in the Yorkshire Dales. Clapham: Dalesman Books. ISBN 0-85206-826-3.
- Ingledew, C. J. Davison (1858). History and Antiquities in the County of York. London: Bell & Daldy. OCLC 557309753.
- Jenkins, Stanley (1993). The Wensleydale Branch; a New History. Oakwood Press. ISBN 0-85361-437-7.
- Suggitt, Gordon (2007). Lost Railways of North & East Yorkshire. Newbury: Countryside Books. ISBN 978-1-85306-918-5.
- Riordan, Michael (1996). Britain in old photographs; Northallerton. Stroud: Sutton Publishing. ISBN 0-7509-0839-4.
- Riordan, Michael (2002). The History of Northallerton, North Yorkshire, from Earliest Times to the Year 2000. Pickering: Blackthorn Press. ISBN 0-9540535-0-8.
