= Stockton railway station (County Durham) =

Railway station in County Durham, England

Stockton
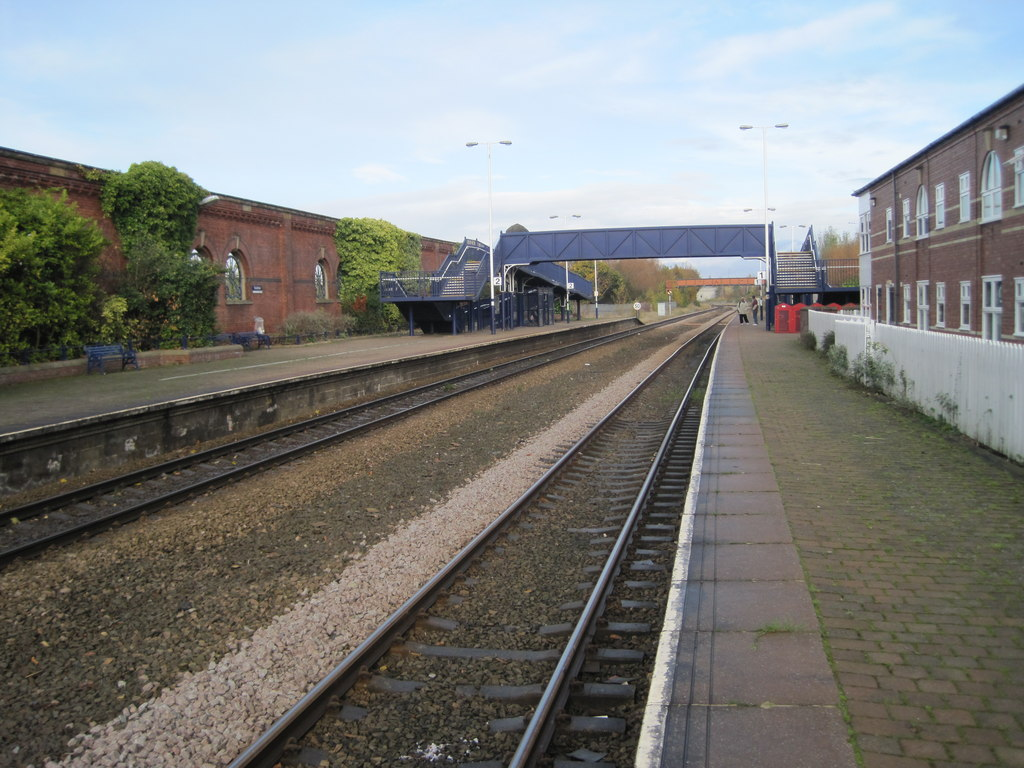

General information
- Location: Stockton-on-Tees, Borough of Stockton-on-Tees; England
- Coordinates: 54°34′12″N 1°19′05″W
- Grid reference: NZ441196
- Owner: Network Rail
- Manager: Northern Trains
- Platforms: 2
- Tracks: 2

Other information
- Station code: STK
- Classification: DfT category F1

History
- Original company: Leeds Northern Railway
- Pre-grouping: North Eastern Railway
- Post-grouping: London and North Eastern Railway; British Rail (North Eastern Region)

Key dates
- 2 June 1852: Opened as Stockton-on-Tees
- 1852/53: Renamed North Stockton
- 1 November 1892: Renamed Stockton-on-Tees
- 1985: Renamed Stockton

Passengers
- 2020/21: ▼26,174
- 2021/22: ▲78,162
- 2022/23: ▲84,768
- 2023/24: ▲0.110 million
- 2024/25: ▲0.120 million
Location
- Location within County Durham
Notes
- Passenger statistics from the Office of Rail and Road

Stockton is a railway station on the Durham Coast Line, which runs between Newcastle and Middlesbrough via Hartlepool. The station, situated 5 miles 45 chains (9.0 km) west of Middlesbrough, serves the market town of Stockton-on-Tees in County Durham, England. It is owned by Network Rail and managed by Northern Trains.

Thornaby railway station (known as "South Stockton" until 1892), across the River Tees from Stockton-on-Tees provides a wider range of services and acts as the main railway station for most of Stockton-on-Tees. This station originally had a roof but it was removed in 1979 due to being in a bad state of repair and it has not been replaced since (the same work also saw the removal of redundant track & platforms). The other main buildings are also no longer in rail use, having been converted into apartments.

Station facilities here have been improved and included new fully lit waiting shelters, digital information screens and the installation of CCTV. The long-line public-address (PA) system has been renewed and upgraded with pre-recorded train announcements. A fully accessible footbridge has also been built to provide step-free access to both platforms. There are however no ticket facilities here (the station being unstaffed), so all tickets have to be bought prior to travel or on the train.

Grand Central services between Sunderland and London King's Cross pass through the station but do not stop here.

== History ==
In 1852 the Leeds Northern Railway (LNR), which had been renamed from the Leeds and Thirsk Railway in 1849, extended its route northwards from Melmerby to Billingham-on-Tees (the now-closed original Billingham station) by way of Northallerton and Eaglescliffe. One of the intermediate stations on the line was at Stockton-on-Tees, this station opening on 2 June 1852; it was very soon renamed, becoming North Stockton in either 1852 or 1853. At that time, it was shared by the LNR and the Stockton and Hartlepool Railway. but soon after, in 1854, they both amalgamated with several other railways to form the North Eastern Railway (NER). On 1 November 1892 this station resumed its original name, and this was retained until 1985 when British Rail simplified the name to Stockton. The 1852 station was rebuilt on the same site in 1892/3 by the NER, including the overall roof mentioned above.

The current station is not at the same location as the former terminus of the Stockton and Darlington Railway (though using the same name).

The station was also served (albeit indirectly) by the Clarence Railway lines from Ferryhill and Simpasture Junction via Redmarshall, which joined the Leeds Northern line at Norton and also by the NER-built route to Wellfield (where it connected to the West Hartlepool - Haswell - Sunderland line) from 1880. These routes were built primarily to convey coal from the many collieries in the area to the docks at Middlesbrough, but the Ferryhill and Wellfield lines also had local passenger services that called here. Trains on the Wellfield route were withdrawn by the LNER in November 1931, whilst the Ferryhill service ended in March 1952.

=== Tees Valley Metro ===
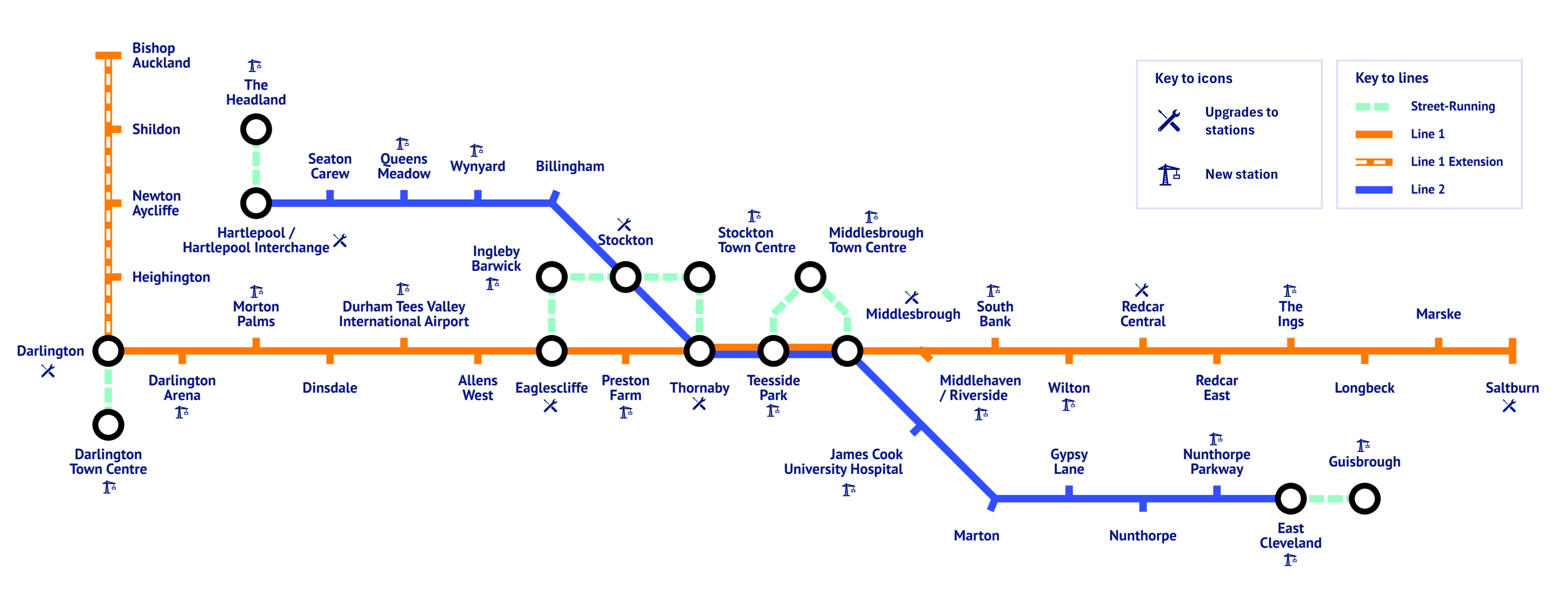
Transit diagram showcasing all discussed or mentioned ideas for the Tees Valley Metro.

Starting in 2006, Stockton was mentioned within the Tees Valley Metro scheme. This was a plan to upgrade the Tees Valley Line and sections of the Esk Valley Line and Durham Coast Line to provide a faster and more frequent service across the North East of England. In the initial phases the services would have been heavy rail mostly along existing alignments with new additional infrastructure and rollingstock. The later phase would have introduced tram-trains to allow street running and further heavy rail extensions.

As part of the scheme, Stockton station would have received improved service to Nunthorpe and Hartlepool, possibly a street-running link to Guisborough and the Headland, as well as new rollingstock.

However, due to a change in government in 2010 and the 2008 financial crisis, the project was ultimately shelved. Several stations eventually got their improvements and there is a possibility of improved rollingstock and services in the future which may affect Stockton.

== Services ==
There is an hourly service from the station in each direction (with a few peak hour extras), northbound to Sunderland and Newcastle and southbound to Middlesbrough. Many northbound trains continue to Hexham, whilst most southbound trains run through to Nunthorpe (some continue beyond there, including two through trains to Whitby).

On Sundays there is an hourly service in each direction between Middlesbrough and Newcastle, with some extensions to/from Carlisle, plus two additional services between Darlington and Hartlepool that avoid Middlesbrough using the original 1852 link via Stockton Cut Junction. These are the last remnants of the much more frequent direct service (approx two-hourly Mon-Sat plus some Sunday trains) that ran between Darlington and Hartlepool up until 1991.

== Sources ==
- Allen, Cecil J. (1974) [1964]. The North Eastern Railway. Shepperton: Ian Allan. ISBN 0-7110-0495-1.
- Body, G. (1988). PSL Field Guides - Railways of the Eastern Region Volume 2. Wellingborough: Patrick Stephens Ltd. ISBN 1-85260-072-1.
- Butt, R.V.J. (1995). The Directory of Railway Stations. Yeovil: Patrick Stephens Ltd. ISBN 1-85260-508-1. R508.

Preceding station	National Rail	Following station
Thornaby	Northern Trains Durham Coast Line	Billingham
Historical railways
Terminus	North Eastern Railway; Clarence Railway	Carlton; Line open, station closed
Terminus	North Eastern Railway; Clarence Railway (Port Clarence Branch)	Norton-on-Tees; Line open, station closed
Terminus	North Eastern Railway; Castle Eden Railway	Thorpe Thewles; Line and station closed
