= Roseberry Parkway railway station =

Proposed railway station in England

Roseberry Parkway

General information
- Location: Nunthorpe, Middlesbrough; England
- Coordinates: 54.5240°N 1.1452°W
- Managed by: Northern (Proposed)
- Platforms: 1

Roseberry Parkway railway station (also known as Nunthorpe Parkway) is a proposed railway station which would be between Nunthorpe and Great Ayton railway stations on the Esk Valley Line, in North Yorkshire, England. The station was proposed in August 2019 by a joint project between Redcar & Cleveland and Middlesbrough Councils and the Tees Valley Combined Authority. The project is "aimed at easing road congestion and improving access to East Cleveland".

A parkway station near Nunthorpe has been proposed since at least 2009 when central government funding was made available for studies into improving transport links in the East Cleveland area. The station was listed as Nunthorpe Parkway in the Tees Valley Metro Project documentation of 2010, though this maintained that any future station would be constructed after 2014. Roseberry Parkway station would serve an estimated population of 70,000 people and seek to encourage 30,000 car journeys away from the Marton Crawl, a name applied to the gridlock along the A-roads (A172 and A171) leading northwards into Middlesbrough.

Although an exact site is not yet proposed, it is suggested that the station is situated in the shadow of Roseberry Topping and would be a transport hub connecting pedestrians, bikes, cars and buses with trains. Trains to Middlesbrough would run half-hourly, with the prospect of trains to Whitby being doubled. Local opinion on the proposals was mixed, with some suggesting a revamp of the station at Teesside Airport as a preferred option for a rail and bus interchange.

Preceding station	National Rail	Following station
Nunthorpe	Northern Esk Valley Line	Great Ayton
