= Kildale railway station =

Railway station in North Yorkshire, England

Kildale
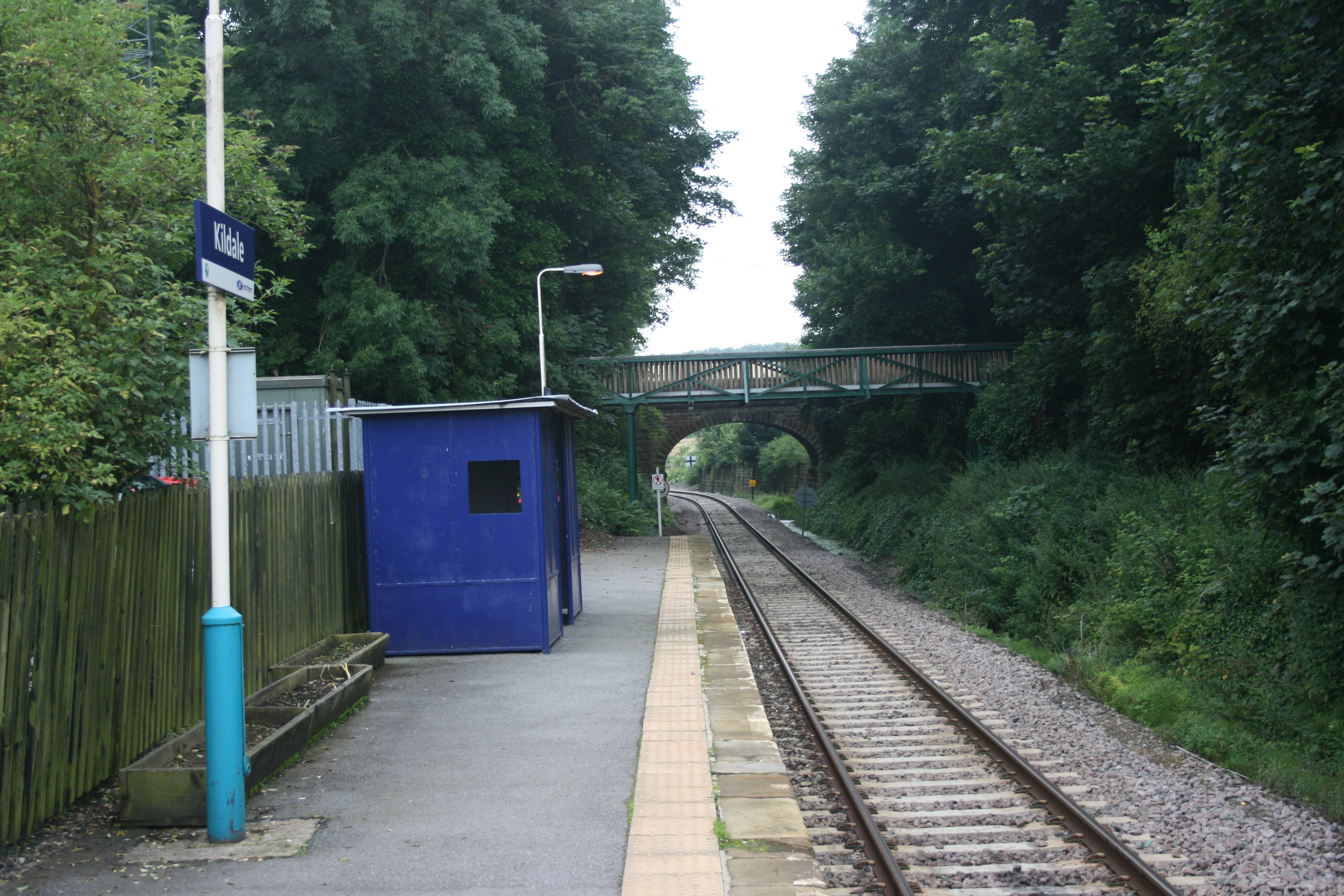

General information
- Location: Kildale, North Yorkshire; England
- Coordinates: 54°28′40″N 1°04′05″W
- Grid reference: NZ604095
- Owner: Network Rail
- Manager: Northern Trains
- Platforms: 1
- Tracks: 1

Other information
- Station code: KLD
- Classification: DfT category F1

History
- Original company: North Eastern Railway
- Pre-grouping: North Eastern Railway
- Post-grouping: London and North Eastern Railway; British Rail (North Eastern Region)

Key dates
- 6 April 1858: Opened

Passengers
- 2021/22: ▲1,276
- 2022/23: ▲1,372
- 2023/24: ▲1,450
- 2024/25: ▲1,672
- 2025/26: ▲2,056
Location
- Location within North Yorkshire
Notes
- Passenger statistics from the Office of Rail and Road

Kildale is a railway station on the Esk Valley Line, which runs between Middlesbrough and Whitby via Nunthorpe. The station, situated 12 miles 65 chains (20.6 km) south-east of Middlesbrough, serves the village of Kildale in North Yorkshire, England. It is owned by Network Rail and managed by Northern Trains.

== History ==
The station opened in April 1858, when the North Yorkshire and Cleveland Railway extended their line from Ingleby Junction (now Battersby) to Kildale. The line was further extended to Commondale and Castleton Moor, in April 1861. Through services to Whitby Town began following the opening of the section between Grosmont and Castleton Moor, the last section of the line to be opened, with service commencing in October 1865.

The station used to have a passing loop. The line, however, now runs as single track for 14 miles and 47 chains from Battersby to Glaisdale.

The station used to have a wooden bridge, which allowed access to St Cuthbert's Church on the north side of the line. During the early 1880s, the North Eastern Railway replaced the wooden bridge with a cast iron structure.

== Facilities ==
The station has one platform, which has seating, a waiting shelter and an emergency help point. There is step-free access to the platform, a small car park, cycle racks and a toilet with a facility for those with disabilities.

Kildale is not part of the Northern Trains penalty fare network, as ticket machines have not yet (as of July 2023) been installed at the station.

== Services ==
As of the May 2026 timetable change, the station is served by five trains per day towards Whitby on weekdays and Saturdays, and four trains on Sunday. In the opposite direction, there are six trains per day to Middlesbrough via Nunthorpe, with four on Sundays. All services are operated by Northern Trains.

Preceding station	National Rail	Following station
Battersby	Northern Trains; Esk Valley Line	Commondale
