= James Cook railway station =

Railway station in North Yorkshire, England

James Cook
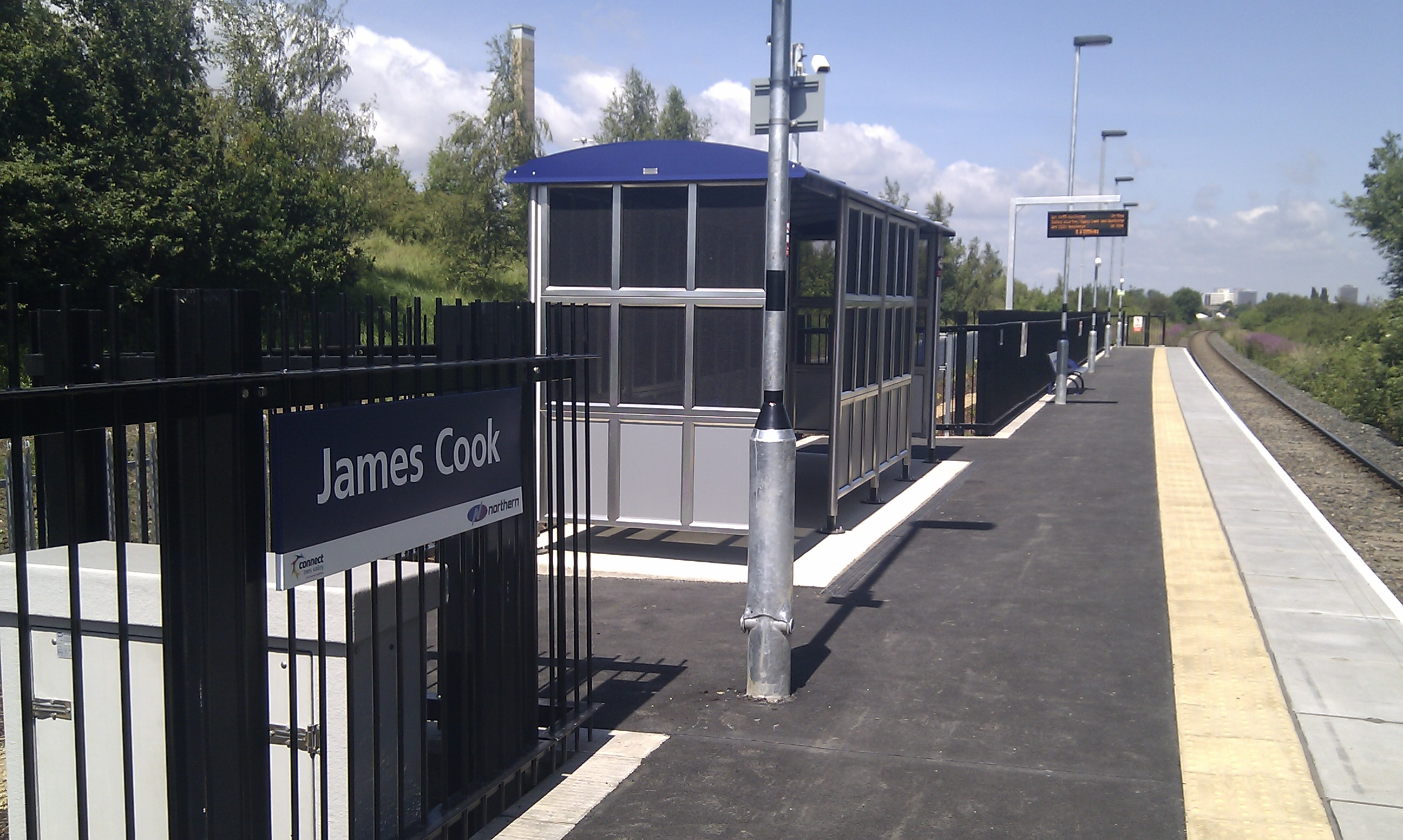

General information
- Location: Park End, Middlesbrough; England
- Coordinates: 54°33′08″N 1°12′31″W
- Grid reference: NZ512177
- Owner: Network Rail
- Manager: Northern Trains
- Platforms: 1
- Tracks: 1

Other information
- Station code: JCH

History
- Original company: Network Rail

Key dates
- 18 May 2014: Opened

Passengers
- 2021/22: ▲26,744
- 2022/23: ▲37,120
- 2023/24: ▲52,370
- 2024/25: ▲60,804
- 2025/26: ▲62,342
Location
- Location within North Yorkshire
Notes
- Passenger statistics from the Office of Rail and Road

James Cook (also known as James Cook University Hospital) is a railway station on the Esk Valley Line, which runs between Middlesbrough and Whitby via Nunthorpe. The station, situated 2 miles 24 chains (3.7 km) south-east of Middlesbrough, serves James Cook University Hospital and the suburbs of Berwick Hills and Park End, Middlesbrough in North Yorkshire, England. It is owned by Network Rail and managed by Northern Trains.

== History ==
Plans for the building of a station at the hospital had been discussed for some 25 years, including as part of the, now abandoned, Tees Valley Metro project.

The station was finally given the green light by Middlesbrough Council's planning committee in January 2013, and construction work started in January 2014.

The station, named after the locally born 18th century British explorer, and circumnavigator Captain James Cook, cost £2.2 million to build and opened to the public on 18 May 2014. It was officially opened on 18 July 2014 by then Minister of State for Transport, Baroness Kramer.

== Facilities ==
The 371-foot (113 m) long single platform station includes a fully lit waiting shelter with seating, CCTV coverage and passenger information via an electronic screen and public address announcements.

== Services ==
Following the May 2021 timetable change, the station is served by an hourly service between Middlesbrough and Nunthorpe, with two trains per day (excluding Sunday) continuing to Battersby, and six per day (four on Sunday) continuing to Whitby. Most trains continue to Newcastle via Hartlepool. All services are operated by Northern Trains.

Rolling stock used: Class 156 Super Sprinter and Class 158 Express Sprinter

| Preceding station | National Rail | Following station |
|---|---|---|
| Middlesbrough | Northern Trains; Esk Valley Line | Marton |
