= Danby railway station =

Railway station in North Yorkshire, England

Danby
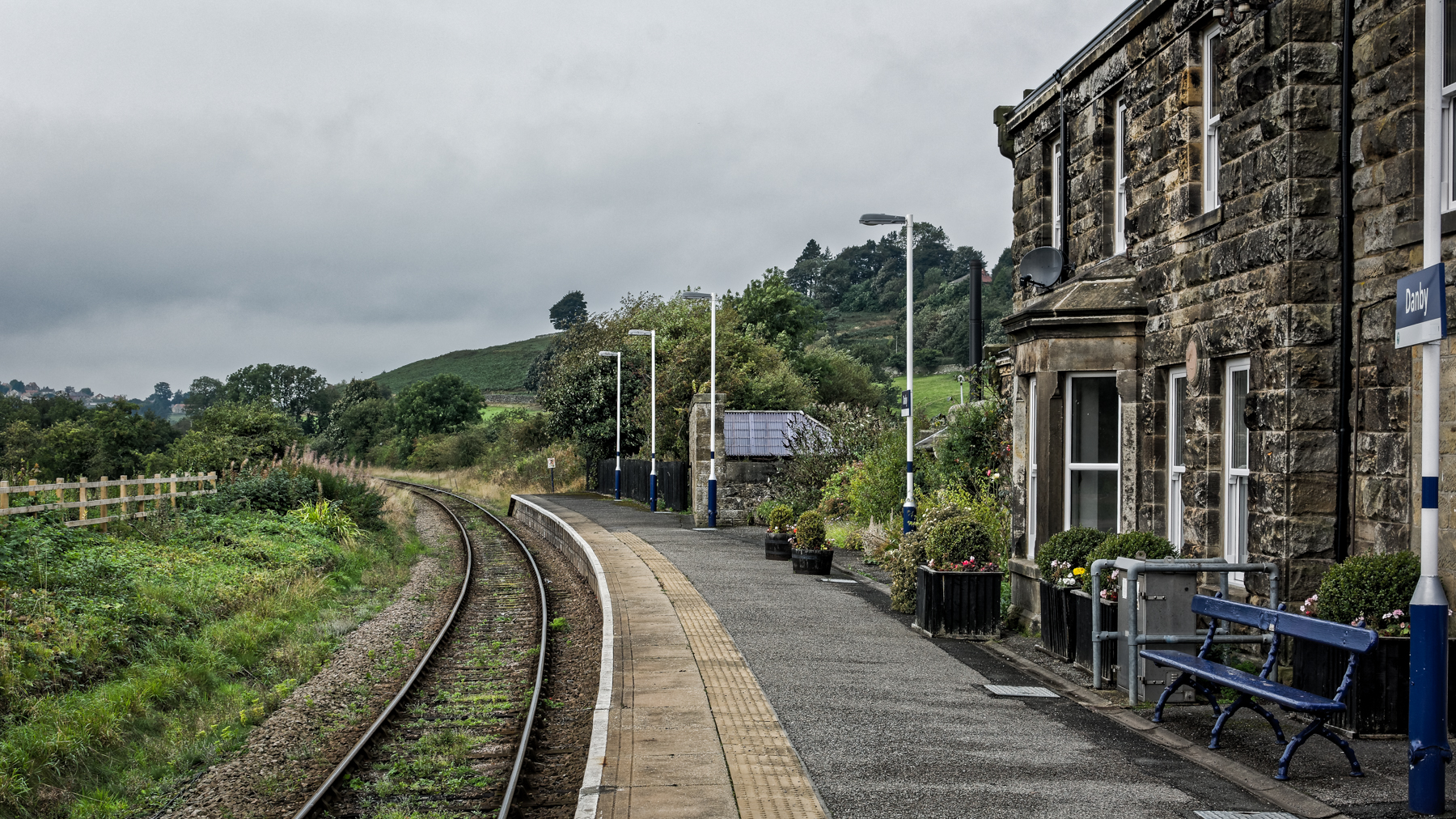

General information
- Location: Danby, North Yorkshire; England
- Coordinates: 54°27′58″N 0°54′40″W
- Grid reference: NZ706084
- Owner: Network Rail
- Manager: Northern Trains
- Platforms: 1
- Tracks: 1

Other information
- Station code: DNY
- Classification: DfT category F2

History
- Original company: North Eastern Railway
- Pre-grouping: North Eastern Railway
- Post-grouping: London and North Eastern Railway; British Rail (North Eastern Region)

Key dates
- 2 October 1865: Opened

Passengers
- 2021/22: ▲4,400
- 2022/23: ▲5,596
- 2023/24: ▲7,414
- 2024/25: ▲8,520
- 2025/26: ▲9,008
Location
- Location within North Yorkshire
Notes
- Passenger statistics from the Office of Rail and Road

Danby is a railway station on the Esk Valley Line, which runs between Middlesbrough and Whitby via Nunthorpe. The station, situated 15 miles 9 chains (24.3 km) west of Whitby, serves the villages of Ainthorpe and Danby, North Yorkshire, England. It is owned by Network Rail and managed by Northern Trains.

== History ==
The station was opened by the North Eastern Railway on 2 October 1865, following the opening of the route between Castleton and Grosmont.

The station was host to a camping coach between 1936 and 1939. Camping coaches were holiday accommodation offered by many railway companies in the United Kingdom from the 1930s. The coaches were old passenger vehicles no longer suitable for use in trains, which were converted to provide sleeping and living space at static locations.

Danby is the location of the North York Moors National Park Visitors' Centre. It is located about 3/4 mile (1.2 km) from the station by foot.

== Services ==
As of the May 2026 timetable change, the station is served by five trains per day towards Whitby on weekdays and Saturdays, and four trains on Sunday. In the opposite direction, there are six trains per day to Middlesbrough via Nunthorpe, with four on Sundays. All services are operated by Northern Trains.

Rolling stock used: Class 156 Super Sprinter and Class 158 Express Sprinter

Preceding station	National Rail	Following station
Castleton Moor	Northern Trains; Esk Valley Line	Lealholm
