= Glaisdale railway station =

Railway station in North Yorkshire, England

Glaisdale
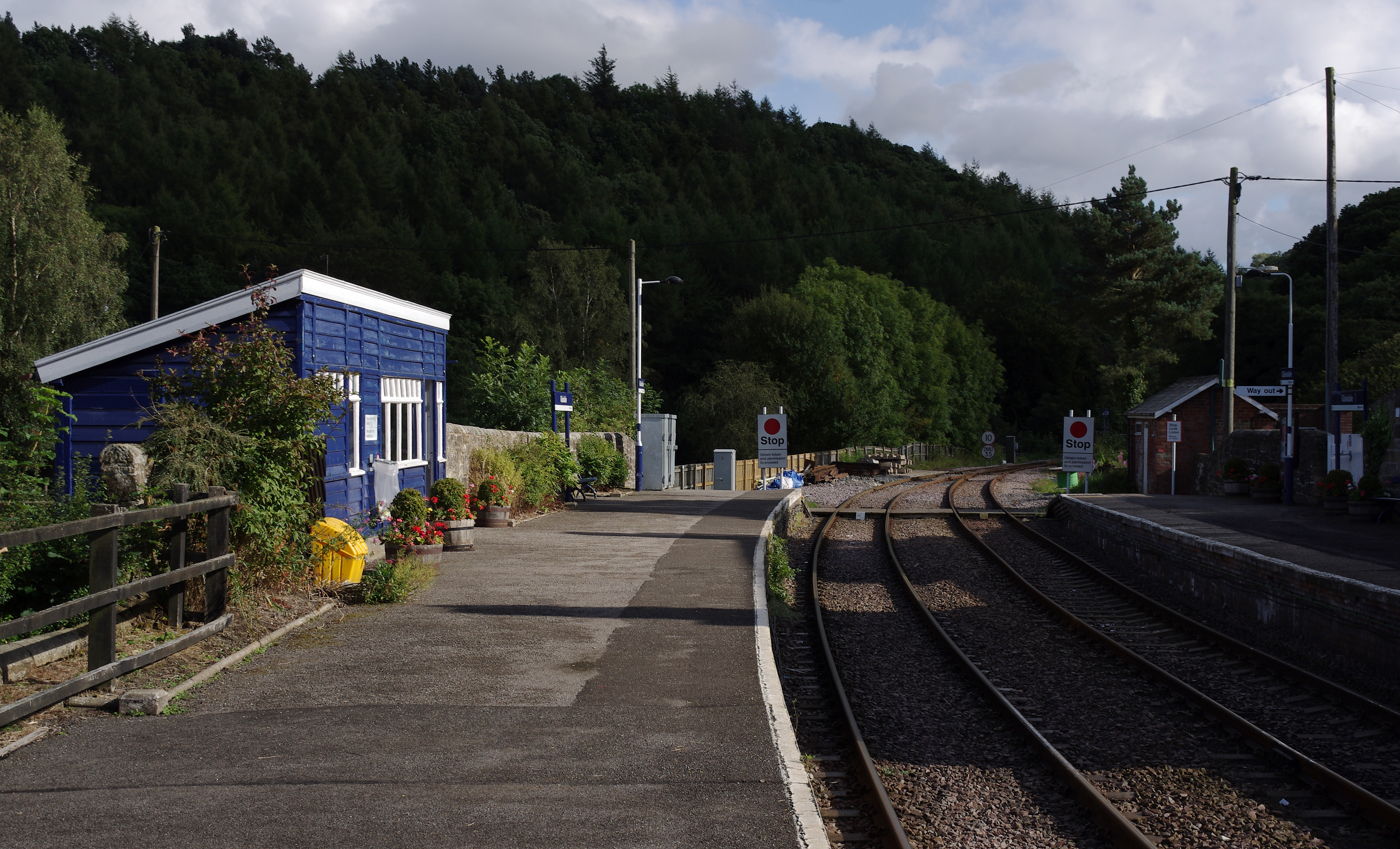

General information
- Location: Glaisdale, North Yorkshire; England
- Coordinates: 54°26′22″N 0°47′38″W
- Grid reference: NZ783055
- Owner: Network Rail
- Manager: Northern Trains
- Platforms: 2
- Tracks: 2

Other information
- Station code: GLS
- Classification: DfT category F2

History
- Original company: North Eastern Railway
- Pre-grouping: North Eastern Railway
- Post-grouping: London and North Eastern Railway; British Rail (North Eastern Region)

Key dates
- 2 October 1865: Opened

Passengers
- 2021/22: ▲18,194
- 2022/23: ▲18,858
- 2023/24: ▲19,178
- 2024/25: ▲19,420
- 2025/26: ▼17,514
Location
- Location within North Yorkshire
Notes
- Passenger statistics from the Office of Rail and Road

Glaisdale is a railway station on the Esk Valley Line, which runs between Middlesbrough and Whitby via Nunthorpe. The station, situated 9 miles 33 chains (15.1 km) west of Whitby, serves the village of Glaisdale in North Yorkshire, England. It is owned by Network Rail and managed by Northern Trains.

== History ==
The station dates from October 1865, when the Castleton to Grosmont line was opened. The signal box was moved northwards in June 1902 to allow the platform to be extended towards the west. Engineers simply raised the box onto rails and slid the box into its new position.

The station used to forward building stone, iron and ironstone. Three blast furnaces were located in the village which utilised two sidings built on the north side of the station with access from the east. The iron industry lasted until 1876, but the slag heaps were cleared sometime in the 1880s with the slag being sold to Surrey County Council. The station was host to a camping coach in 1933 and 1935, possibly one for some of 1934 and two coaches from 1936 to 1939, the station was also used as an overnight stop for touring camping coach service in 1935. Along with many other stations along the line (like Egton and Grosmont), the station lost its goods facilities in August 1965.

A passing loop is located here – one of only two remaining on the entire Esk Valley Line. The signal box that once operated it can still be seen on the Whitby-bound platform, but since 1989 the loop points have worked automatically and the token machines for the single line block sections either side are operated by the train crew, under the remote supervision of the Nunthorpe signaller.

Tokens are also available at the intermediate point of Grosmont station, which allows for the North York Moors Railway to operate on the single line section between Grosmont and Whitby in parallel with the Northern Trains service.

In May 2018, the Community Rail Partnership for the Esk Valley Line opened new public toilets on the station.

== Services ==
As of the December 2025 timetable change, the station is served by six trains per day on Mondays to Saturdays and four on Sundays towards Whitby. Heading towards Middlesbrough via Nunthorpe, there are six trains per day on Mondays to Saturdays, with one continuing to Newcastle via Hartlepool, and four on Sundays, with two continuing to Darlington. All services are operated by Northern Trains.

Rolling stock used: Class 156 Super Sprinter and Class 158 Express Sprinter

Preceding station	National Rail	Following station
Lealholm	Northern Trains; Esk Valley Line	Egton
