= Lealholm railway station =

Railway station in North Yorkshire, England

Lealholm
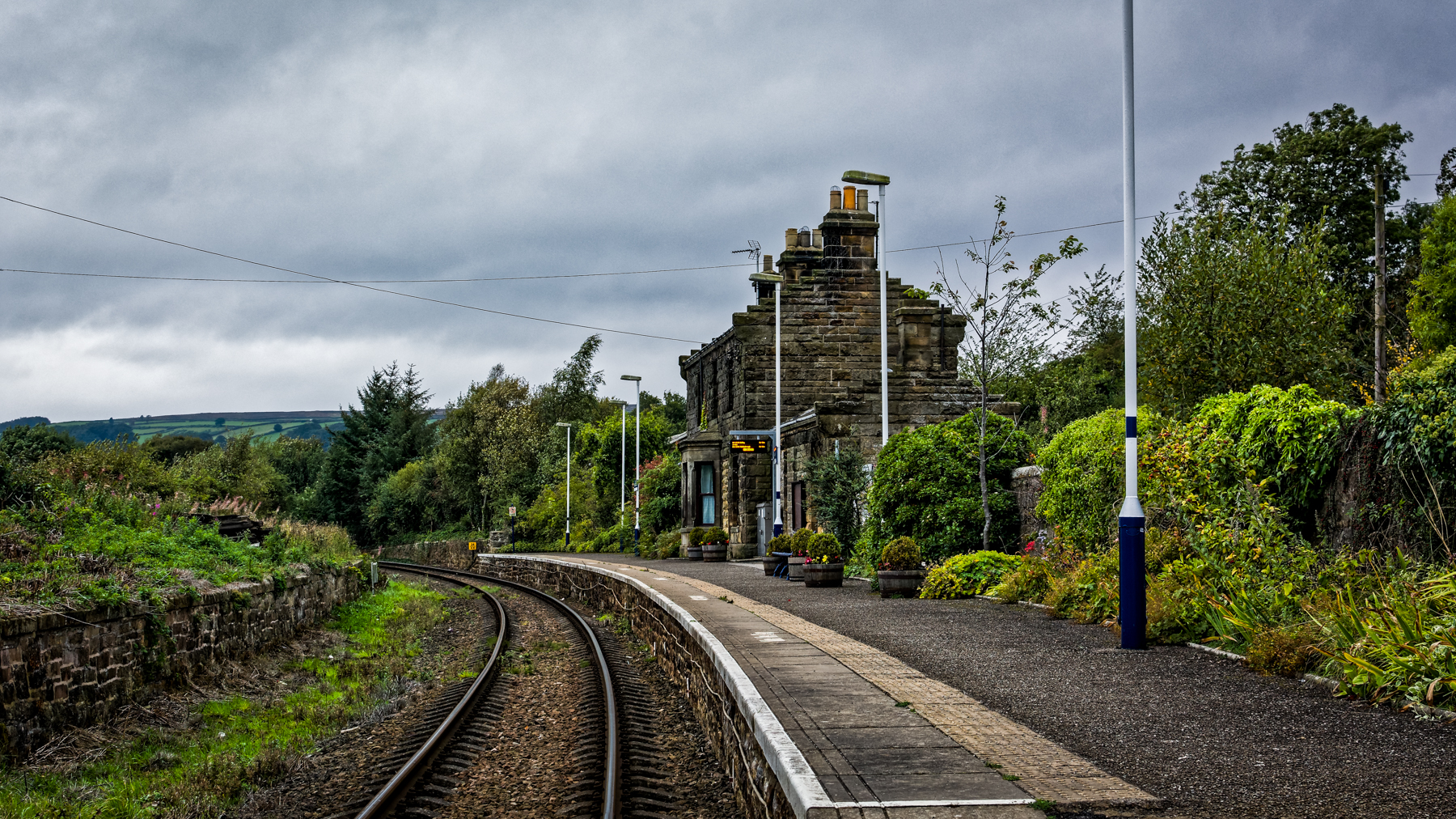

General information
- Location: Lealholm, North Yorkshire; England
- Coordinates: 54°27′38″N 0°49′32″W
- Grid reference: NZ762078
- Owner: Network Rail
- Manager: Northern Trains
- Platforms: 1
- Tracks: 1

Other information
- Station code: LHM
- Classification: DfT category F2

History
- Original company: North Eastern Railway
- Pre-grouping: North Eastern Railway
- Post-grouping: London and North Eastern Railway; British Rail (North Eastern Region)

Key dates
- 2 October 1865: Opened

Passengers
- 2021/22: ▲8,834
- 2022/23: ▼8,010
- 2023/24: ▲8,598
- 2024/25: ▼6,868
- 2025/26: ▲8,068
Location
- Location within North Yorkshire
Notes
- Passenger statistics from the Office of Rail and Road

Lealholm is a railway station on the Esk Valley Line, which runs between Middlesbrough and Whitby via Nunthorpe. The station, situated 11 miles 40 chains (18.5 km) west of Whitby, serves the village of Lealholm in North Yorkshire, England. It is owned by Network Rail and managed by Northern Trains.

== History ==
Lealholm was opened as part of the final stretch of line from Picton (where the line joined what is now a loop on the East Coast Main Line) to Grosmont (where it met the Whitby - Pickering railway) authorised under the North Yorkshire and Cleveland Railway Act 1854 (17 & 18 Vict. c. cli) of 10 July 1854.

The stretch from Castleton Moor to Grosmont was opened on 2 October 1865, and Lealholm, sometimes referred to in early North Eastern Railway timetables as Lealholme or Lealholme Bridge, is located on a stretch of line between Castleton and Glaisdale which has always been single track. Lealholm used to have a passing loop at the station where freight trains could pass passenger trains. The remains of the disused platform are clearly visible, now overgrown with grasses and weeds, although no evidence exists that that platform was ever used during the 20th century. There also used to be a signal box at the station, long since demolished.

Heading up the line in the direction of Middlesbrough, the nearest station is based at Danby. However, the hamlet of Houlsyke, situated about 1 3/4 miles (2.8 km) east of Danby, used to have a siding serving the farming community. The points were operated by a ground frame locked by the tablet for the section between Danby and Glaisdale.

The station was host to a LNER camping coach from 1937 to 1939 and possibly one for some of 1934.

Trains stop at the main station platform where the Station Master's house is based (now a private residence). Only a small internal shelter remains in the station building. Between Castleton and Grosmont, the later section of line to be built, the design of the station buildings uses a crow stepped gable at each end, favoured by the NER company in the mid-1860s. Despite a lack of staffing, the station is well cared for, with plants tended by the village WI.

Today, the line is generally quiet except for the school train on a morning and early evening. Like most of the surrounding villages, Lealholm has its own infant and primary school, however pupils travel to secondary schools and a college in Whitby.

Lealholm was also home to a typical NER goods shed and coal yard, which later became the factory base when the company Lightspeed panels was set up in 1972. They produced the Magenta kit car - A fibreglass body kit based on a Mini chassis. Today the site is a car repair garage. On Oatmeal Hill next to the station, 4 semi-detached railway cottages were built, finally being sold off privately in 1970. Railway cottages 1&2 with their stone finish were merged to form what is now "The Croft", and Railway cottages 3&4 (a later addition for lowly railway workers) with its cheaper brick built finish merged to form "Oatmill cottage". Because of the work required to make the building habitable its brick finish was covered with a distinctive white rendering which, in line with another white house along Lealholmside has often been used as a landmark by RAF fighter jet pilots flying low along the Esk valley.

Just downline (in the direction of Whitby) from the station, a vast embankment was built to carry the railway over a valley carrying the small Park Wood Beck. The poet John Castillo spent much of his time in this valley, and in his day it appears to have been a beautiful wooded valley. Today what remains is mainly covered with bracken and grazed by sheep. The beck now runs beneath the embankment in a large cylindrical stone lined tunnel around 8 feet in diameter, and can be walked from end to end. Inside it is pitch black, as due to the curvature of the tunnel it is not possible see from one end to the other. An opening in the wall near the upstream end carries a small brook into the beck.

Upline from Lealholm, the railway curves round the village before entering one of the deepest cuttings on the line, to pass through a giant glacial dam formed from rock pushed up the valley during the last great ice age.

A very similar range of station buildings, including a goods shed have been carefully restored at Goathland station on the NYMR, both stations were built about the same time and by the same contractor, Thomas Nelson.

== Proposed branches ==
Downline from Lealholm at Rake Farm, the line was to have met a branch running across the moors to support the Iron ore industry hereabouts. It was never finished although the route's earthworks still exist, and has become known as Paddy Waddell's Railway in honour of the engineer John Waddell and his Irish Navvies who built what remains of the embankments and ditches that can still be found along the route. One completed bridge still survives at Rakes Farm.

The original proposals for the Picton to Grosmont Line included plans for a minor branch line leaving the railway upline at nearby Houlsyke and running 0.5 miles (0.8 km) south to what is now Furnace Farm. this would likely have served ironstone workings, traces of which can be found throughout nearby Fryup Dale.

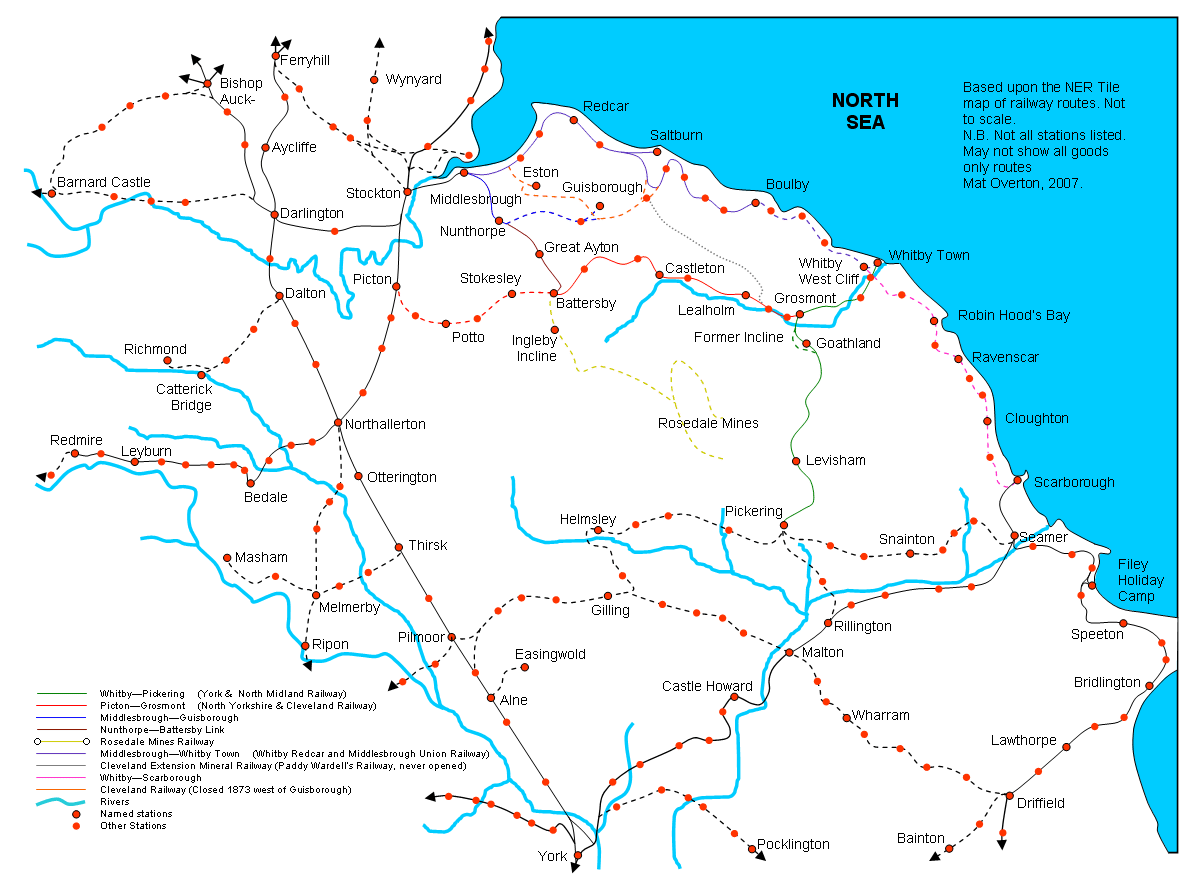
Map of railway routes across the North Yorkshire Moors

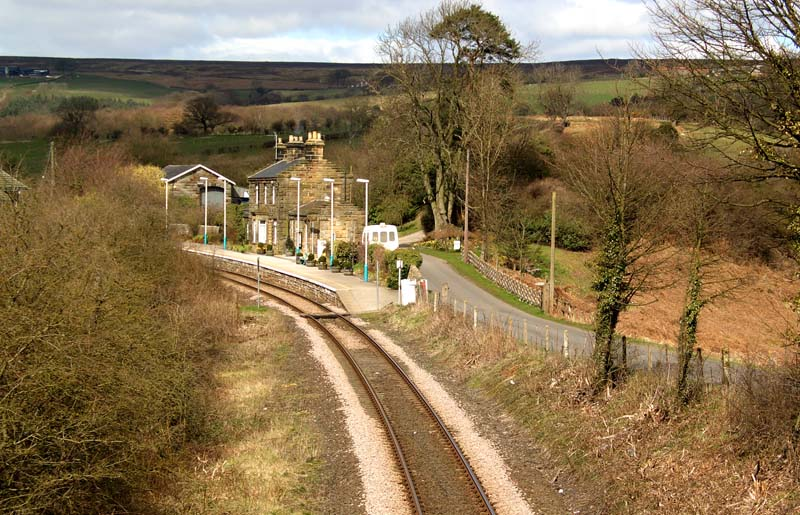
View of Lealholm Station

== Services ==
As of the May 2026 timetable change, the station is served by five trains per day towards Whitby on weekdays and Saturdays, and four trains on Sunday. In the opposite direction, there are six trains per day to Middlesbrough via Nunthorpe, with four on Sundays. All services are operated by Northern Trains.

Rolling stock used: Class 156 Super Sprinter and Class 158 Express Sprinter

== Sources ==
- Suggitt, G. (2005). Lost Railways of North & East Yorkshire: Dalesman Books. ISBN 0-85206-731-3

| Preceding station | National Rail | Following station |
|---|---|---|
| Danby | Northern Trains; Esk Valley Line | Glaisdale |
