= Commondale railway station =

Railway station in North Yorkshire, England

Commondale
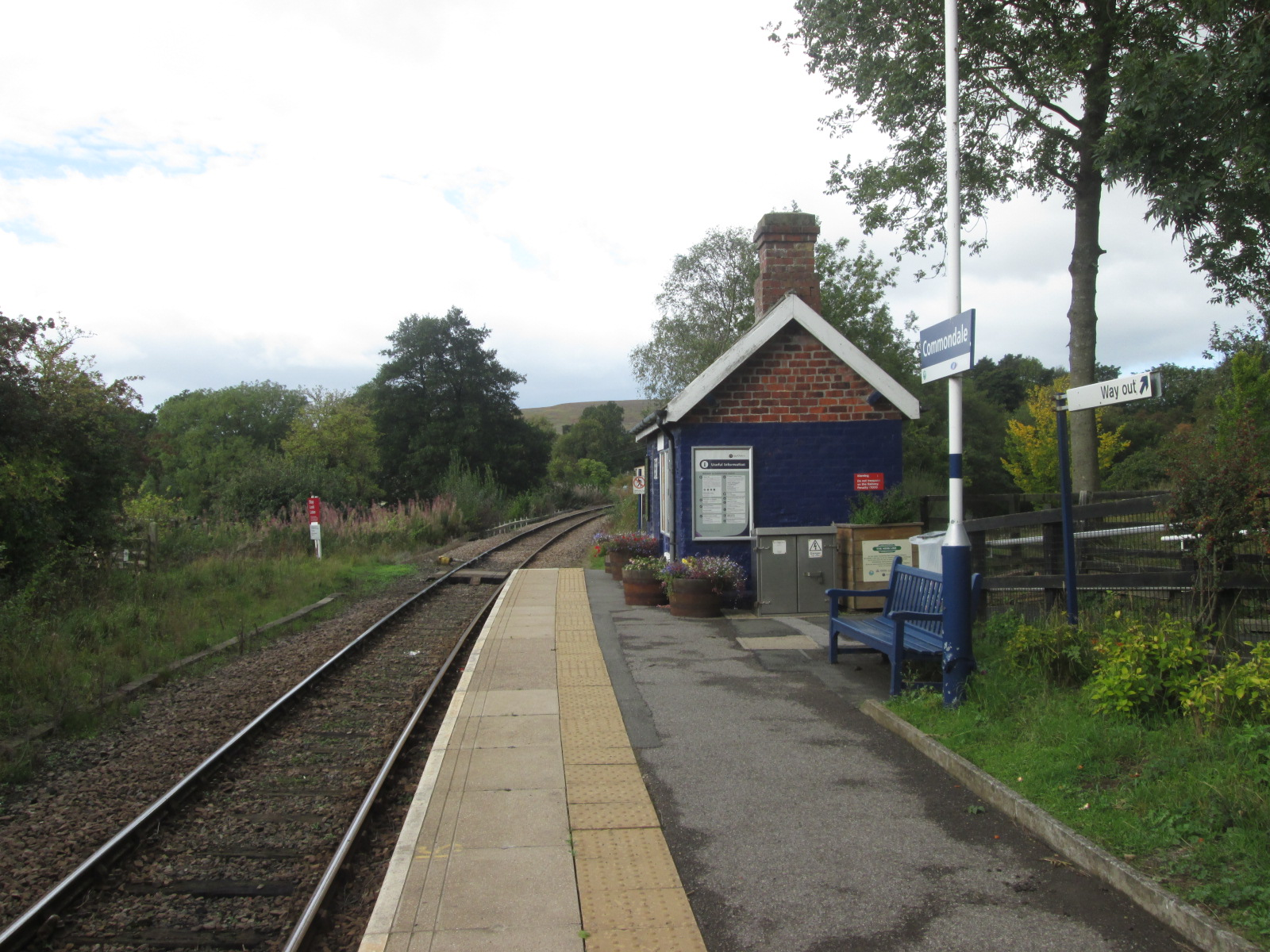

General information
- Location: Commondale, North Yorkshire; England
- Coordinates: 54°28′52″N 0°58′30″W
- Grid reference: NZ665100
- Owner: Network Rail
- Manager: Northern Trains
- Platforms: 1
- Tracks: 1

Other information
- Station code: COM
- Classification: DfT category F2

History
- Original company: North Eastern Railway
- Pre-grouping: North Eastern Railway
- Post-grouping: London and North Eastern Railway; British Rail (North Eastern Region)

Key dates
- 1882: Opened as Commondale Siding
- 1891: Renamed Commondale

Passengers
- 2021/22: ▲2,446
- 2022/23: ▼2,294
- 2023/24: ▼2,224
- 2024/25: ▼2,120
- 2025/26: ▲3,546
Location
- Location within North Yorkshire
Notes
- Passenger statistics from the Office of Rail and Road

Commondale is a railway station on the Esk Valley Line, which runs between Middlesbrough and Whitby via Nunthorpe. The station, situated 16 miles 72 chains (27.2 km) south-east of Middlesbrough, serves the village of Commondale in North Yorkshire, England. It is owned by Network Rail and managed by Northern Trains.

== History ==
The North Yorkshire & Cleveland Railway opened an extension line from Battersby to Grosmont in stages between 1858 and 1865. Even though the line through Commondale was opened in April 1861, it would be some years before the North Eastern Railway furnished the remote dale with a station. As the area was populated with small hamlets mostly engaged in agriculture, no station was provided immediately, but a siding was furnished for the Cleveland Fire Brick & Pottery Company (CFBaPC). The CFBaPC attracted a workforce which led to a significant rise in the population, which in turn prompted a station to be built in 1891. (Note: Some sources state 1894 and 1895.) Previous to this, a signal box had been installed to control the west facing branch to the brickworks and the junction was used to board passengers with the name of Commondale Siding being used as a station name. Records indicate that in 1885, six years before Commondale was given full official station status, 3,555 passenger tickers were sold totalling a revenue of £99.

Even with the increased population, passenger numbers were low and apart from the freight siding, the station did not handle any goods during its lifetime. It did have several station masters (eight between 1891 and 1954) though they resided at the other station that they had responsibility for (Castleton Moor) from 1930 onwards. The station became the first in the area to become an unstaffed halt; this was effective from 16 January 1950.

The single platform, on the northern side of the line, has a single brick building, in the same style as other buildings in the hamlet, as opposed to stone built buildings at most other places on the line.

== Services ==
As of the May 2026 timetable change, the station is served by five trains per day towards Whitby on weekdays and Saturdays, and four trains on Sunday. In the opposite direction, there are six trains per day to Middlesbrough via Nunthorpe, with four on Sundays. All services are operated by Northern Trains.

== Sources ==
- Bairstow, Martin (2008). Railways around Whitby; volume one (4 ed.). Farsley: Bairstow. ISBN 978-1-871944-34-1.
- Maynard, Peter (2015). North Yorkshire & Cleveland Railway. Northallerton: North Eastern Railway Association. ISBN 978-1-873513-98-9.

Preceding station	National Rail	Following station
Kildale	Northern Trains; Esk Valley Line	Castleton Moor
