= Castleton Moor railway station =

Railway station in North Yorkshire, England

Castleton Moor

General information
- Location: Castleton, North Yorkshire; England
- Coordinates: 54°28′02″N 0°56′48″W
- Grid reference: NZ683084
- Owner: Network Rail
- Manager: Northern Trains
- Platforms: 1
- Tracks: 1

Other information
- Station code: CSM
- Classification: DfT category F2

History
- Original company: North Eastern Railway
- Pre-grouping: North Eastern Railway
- Post-grouping: London and North Eastern Railway; British Rail (North Eastern Region)

Key dates
- 1 April 1861: Opened as Castleton
- 1 March 1965: Renamed Castleton Moor

Passengers
- 2021/22: ▲4,732
- 2022/23: ▲4,794
- 2023/24: ▲5,756
- 2024/25: ▲6,668
- 2025/26: ▲7,194
Location
- Location within North Yorkshire
Notes
- Passenger statistics from the Office of Rail and Road

Castleton Moor is a railway station on the Esk Valley Line, which runs between Middlesbrough and Whitby via Nunthorpe. The station, situated 16 miles 45 chains (26.7 km) west of Whitby, serves the village of Castleton in North Yorkshire, England. It is owned by Network Rail and managed by Northern Trains.

== History ==
The station opened in April 1861 as the temporary terminus of the North Yorkshire and Cleveland Railway route from Stokesley. This was extended eastwards to Grosmont four years later - formal opening occurring on 2 October 1865 with the station being named simply Castleton. A direct link from Battersby through to Nunthorpe and Middlesbrough was also commissioned at this time – this is the route now used by all trains, as the original line west of Battersby was closed to passengers in June 1954 and completely four years later. In 1965, the station was renamed Castleton Moor.

Though the line was built with a single track, the station was provided with two platforms as it was the location of one of the route's passing loops. A signal box was also constructed here, along with a goods shed and associated yard - these all survived (along with the loop) until the final withdrawal of goods services over the route in 1982. The goods shed can still be seen but the loop has been lifted, the second platform removed and the box demolished.

Platform

== Services ==
As of the May 2026 timetable change, the station is served by five trains per day towards Whitby on weekdays and Saturdays, and four trains on Sunday. In the opposite direction, there are six trains per day to Middlesbrough via Nunthorpe, with four on Sundays. All services are operated by Northern Trains.

Rolling stock used: Class 156 Super Sprinter and Class 158 Express Sprinter

Preceding station	National Rail	Following station
Commondale	Northern Trains; Esk Valley Line	Danby
