= Gypsy Lane railway station =

Railway station in North Yorkshire, England

Gypsy Lane
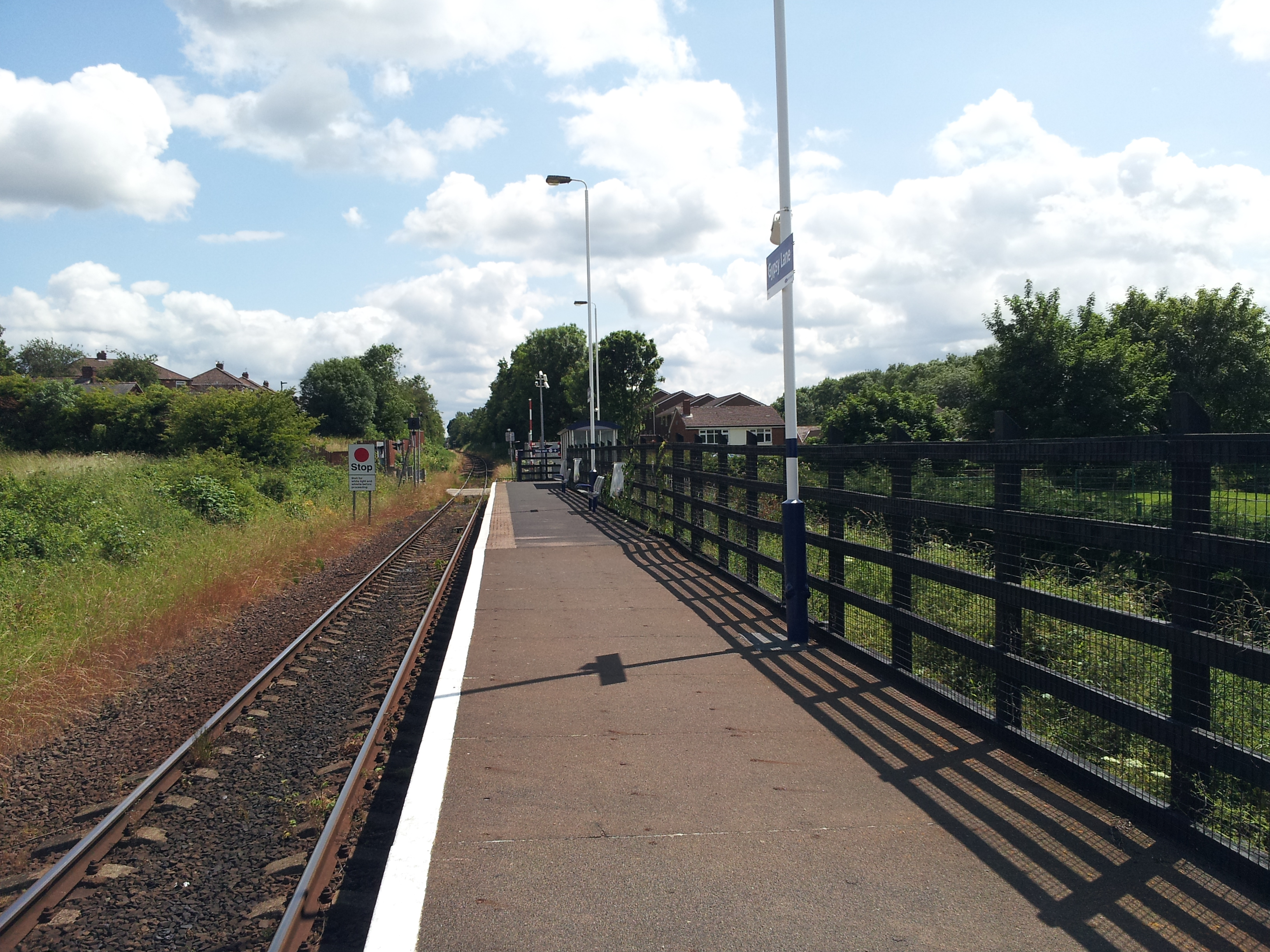

General information
- Location: Nunthorpe, Redcar and Cleveland; England
- Coordinates: 54°32′01″N 1°10′50″W
- Grid reference: NZ531156
- Owner: Network Rail
- Manager: Northern Trains
- Platforms: 1
- Tracks: 1

Other information
- Station code: GYP
- Classification: DfT category F2

History
- Original company: British Rail (Eastern Region)

Key dates
- 3 May 1976: Opened

Passengers
- 2021/22: ▲30,056
- 2022/23: ▲31,626
- 2023/24: ▲38,398
- 2024/25: ▲44,024
- 2025/26: ▲46,182
Location
- Location within North Yorkshire
Notes
- Passenger statistics from the Office of Rail and Road

Gypsy Lane is a railway station on the Esk Valley Line, which runs between Middlesbrough and Whitby via Nunthorpe. The station, situated 4 miles 3 chains (6.5 km) south-east of Middlesbrough, serves the suburb of Nunthorpe, Redcar and Cleveland in North Yorkshire, England. It is owned by Network Rail and managed by Northern Trains.

== History ==
The station was opened on 3 May 1976 by the Eastern Region of British Railways, at a cost of £24,000 (equivalent to £162,000 in 2025), and was expected to have a footfall of 150 passengers per day. The station was built in an area of increasing housing development, which at that time, was poorly served by public transport.

=== Tees Valley Metro ===
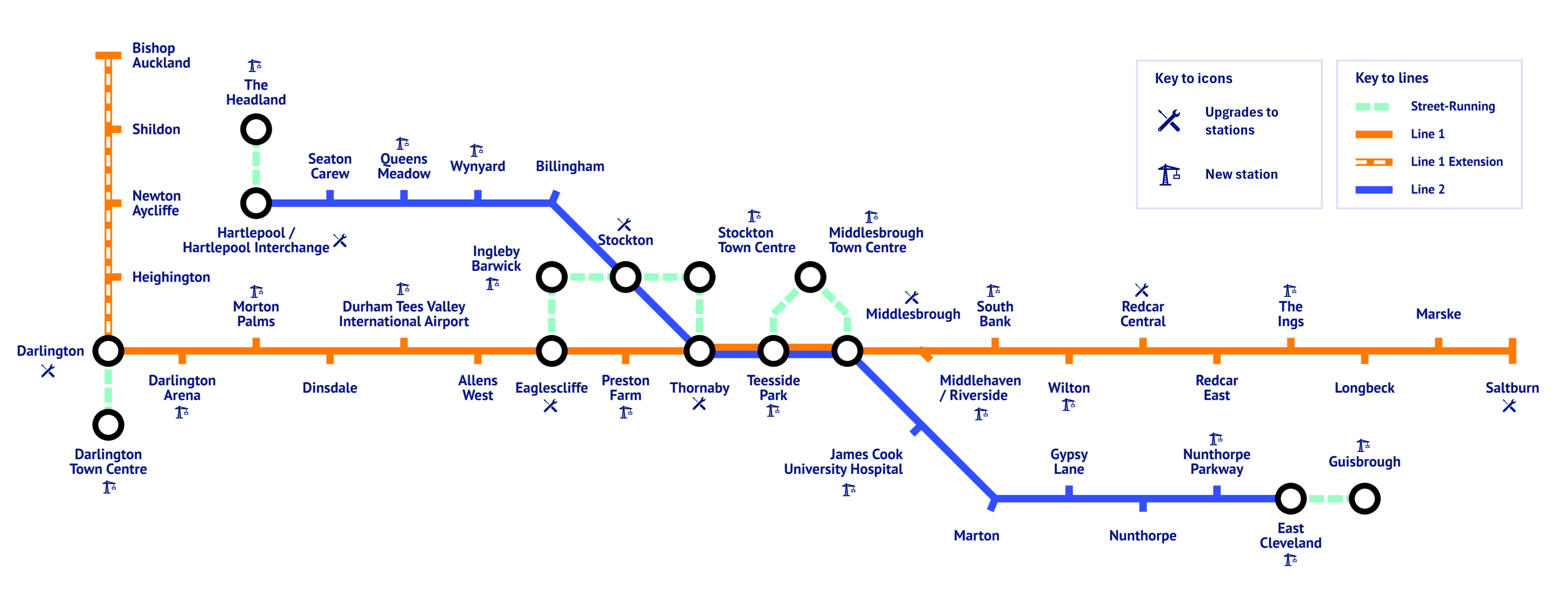
Transit diagram showcasing all discussed or mentioned ideas for the Tees Valley Metro.

Starting in 2006, Gypsy Lane was mentioned within the Tees Valley Metro scheme. This was a plan to upgrade the Tees Valley Line and sections of the Esk Valley Line and Durham Coast Line to provide a faster and more frequent service across the North East of England. In the initial phases the services would have been heavy rail mostly along existing alignments with new additional infrastructure and rollingstock. The later phase would have introduced tram-trains to allow street running and further heavy rail extensions.

As part of the scheme, Gypsy Lane station would have received improved service to Nunthorpe and Hartlepool, possibly a street-running link to Guisborough and the Headland, as well as new rollingstock.

However, due to a change in government in 2010 and the 2008 financial crisis, the project was ultimately shelved. Several stations eventually got their improvements and there is a possibility of improved rollingstock and services in the future which may affect Gypsy Lane.

== Facilities ==
In 2013, the station was refurbished, with new and upgraded facilities, including a new fully lit waiting shelter, renewed station signage and the installation of CCTV.

In February 2016, an upgraded next train announcement audio and visual display was installed at the station, with a ticket machine being added in August 2019.

== Services ==
Following the May 2021 timetable change, the station is served by an hourly service between Middlesbrough and Nunthorpe, with two trains per day (excluding Sunday) continuing to Battersby, and six per day (four on Sunday) continuing to Whitby. Most trains continue to Newcastle via Hartlepool. All services are operated by Northern Trains.

Rolling stock used: Class 156 Super Sprinter and Class 158 Express Sprinter

Preceding station	National Rail	Following station
Marton	Northern Trains; Esk Valley Line	Nunthorpe
