= Ruswarp railway station =

Railway station in North Yorkshire, England

Ruswarp
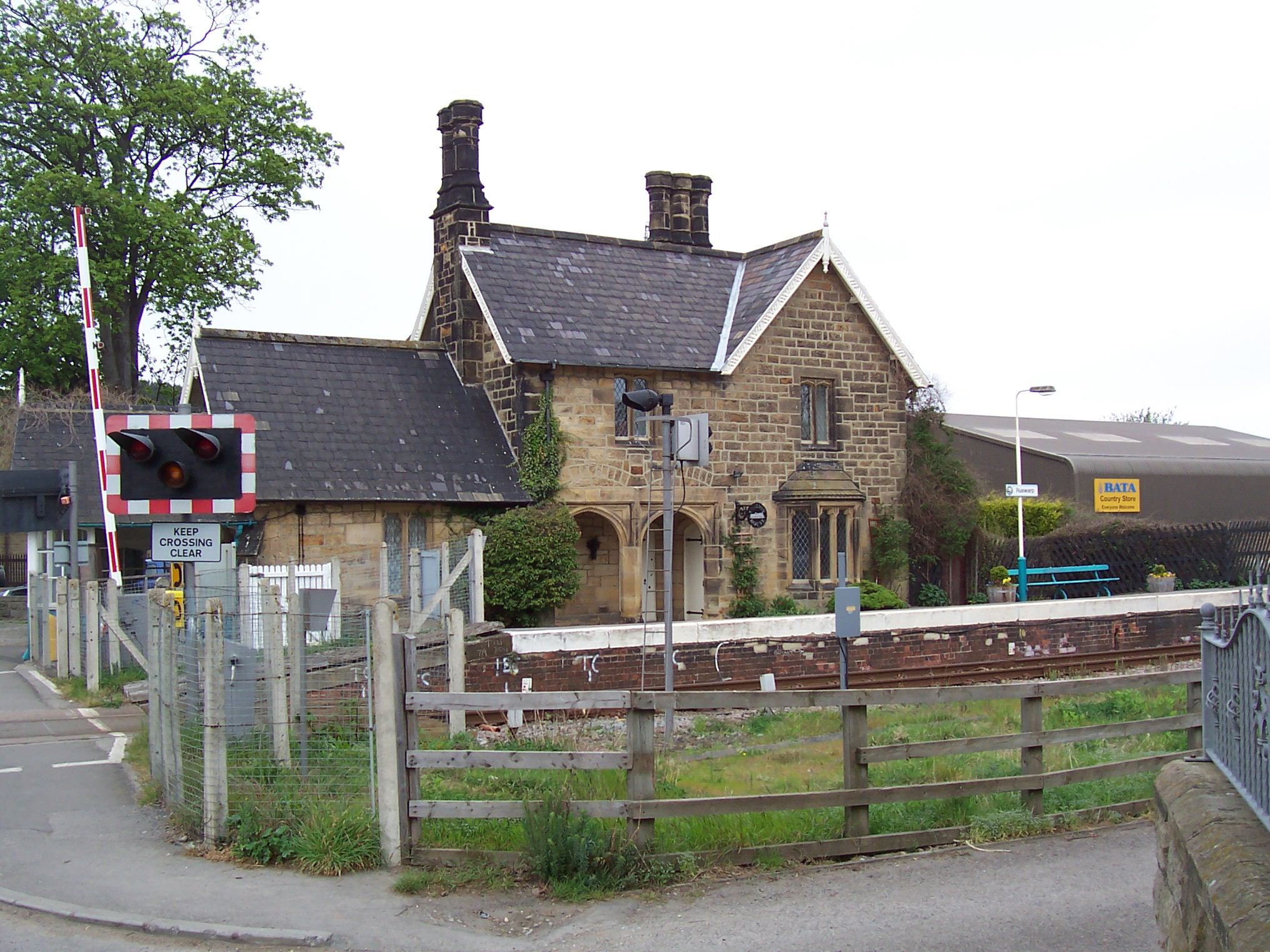

General information
- Location: Ruswarp, North Yorkshire; England
- Coordinates: 54°28′12″N 0°37′40″W
- Grid reference: NZ890091
- Owner: Network Rail
- Manager: Northern Trains
- Platforms: 1
- Tracks: 1

Other information
- Station code: RUS
- Classification: DfT category F2

History
- Original company: Whitby and Pickering Railway
- Pre-grouping: North Eastern Railway
- Post-grouping: London and North Eastern Railway; British Rail (North Eastern Region)

Key dates
- 8 June 1835: Opened

Passengers
- 2021/22: ▲3,054
- 2022/23: ▼2,952
- 2023/24: ▲4,002
- 2024/25: ▲4,112
- 2025/26: ▲5,008
Location
- Location within North Yorkshire
Notes
- Passenger statistics from the Office of Rail and Road

Ruswarp is a railway station on the Esk Valley Line, which runs between Middlesbrough and Whitby via Nunthorpe. The station, situated 1 mile 30 chains (2.2 km) south-west of Whitby, serves the village of Ruswarp in North Yorkshire, England. It is owned by Network Rail and managed by Northern Trains.

== History ==
The line through Ruswarp was opened in June 1835, as the initial section of the Whitby and Pickering Railway between Whitby and Grosmont. The station first appears in a timetable for May 1848, though it was used before that; in July 1835, over 1,000 people were carried between Pickering and Ruswarp for the Ruswarp Fair Day. (Note: Different sources state different opening times. Hoole states 1847 (three years before the station building, when the line was fully converted from horse operation to steam). Bairstow states that the station opened on 15 May 1835.)

The main railway building, which remains to this day and is now grade II listed, was designed by the architect G T Andrews and was built in 1850 at the request of the York and North Midland Railway who owned the line through acquisition. Immediately to the west of the station is an automatic barrier level crossing and a lattice-work iron bridge over the River Esk. The original Whitby and Pickering Railway bridge was made from Baltic pine and covered a distance of 312 feet (95 m), crossing the river on a diagonal compared to its flow. The design of the station was similar to that at Sleights railway station, but with Tudor arches and Tudor chimneys.

Behind the main station building was a three-road goods yard, with a connection facing towards Whitby. The yard was listed as forwarding flour and bran as it chief commodities - the village had a large mill powered by the river. A camping coach was positioned here by the North Eastern Region from 1959 to 1964. A second goods siding was located just across the river (on the south bank) with access to both directions of the running line. This was Sneathonthopre Siding and dealt mostly with cattle. Both goods sidings were closed in early August 1965.

In the early 1980s, rationalisation of the Esk Valley Line led to the singling of the line between Grosmont and Whitby. The down line through the station was kept open, whilst the up line and platform were removed. The signal box was kept open as control for the level crossing until 1986 when it was automated.

== Services ==
As of the December 2025 timetable change, the station is served by six trains per day on Mondays to Saturdays and four on Sundays towards Whitby. Heading towards Middlesbrough via Nunthorpe, there are six trains per day on Mondays to Saturdays, with one continuing to Newcastle via Hartlepool, and four on Sundays, with two continuing to Darlington. All services are operated by Northern Trains.

Rolling stock used: Class 156 Super Sprinter and Class 158 Express Sprinter

Preceding station	National Rail	Following station
Sleights	Northern Trains; Esk Valley Line	Whitby

== See also ==
- Listed buildings in Whitby (outer areas)

== Bibliography ==
- Bairstow, Martin (2008). Railways Around Whitby, Volume 1. Farsley: Bairstow. ISBN 978-1-871944-34-1.
