= Marton railway station (North Yorkshire) =

Railway station in North Yorkshire, England

Marton
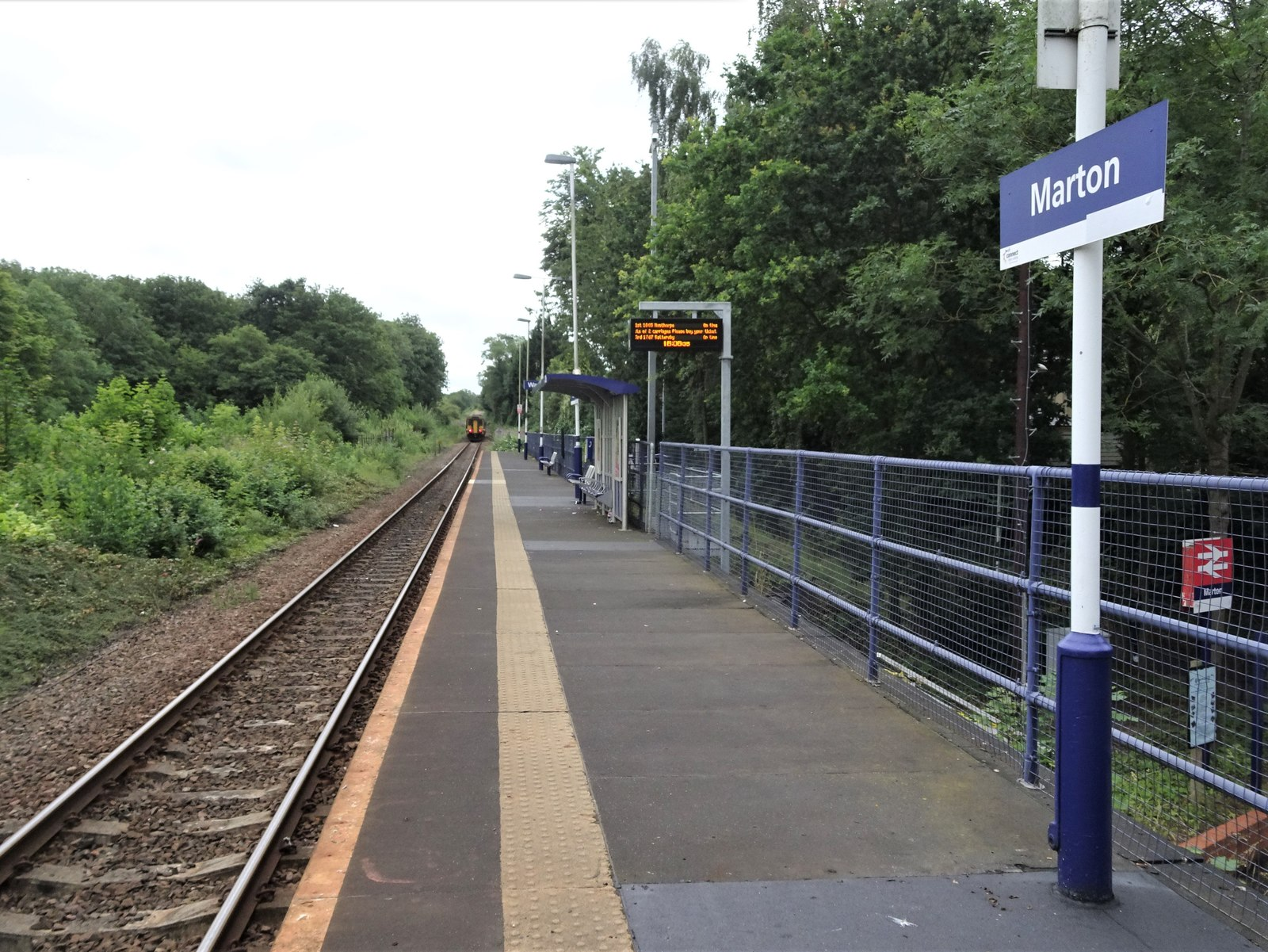

General information
- Location: Marton, Middlesbrough; England
- Coordinates: 54°32′40″N 1°11′55″W
- Grid reference: NZ519168
- Owner: Network Rail
- Manager: Northern Trains
- Platforms: 1
- Tracks: 1

Other information
- Station code: MTO
- Classification: DfT category F2

History
- Original company: Middlesbrough and Guisborough Railway
- Pre-grouping: North Eastern Railway
- Post-grouping: London and North Eastern Railway; British Rail (Eastern Region)

Key dates
- 25 February 1854: Opened as Ormesby
- 17 May 1982: Renamed Marton

Passengers
- 2021/22: ▲19,638
- 2022/23: ▲22,178
- 2023/24: ▲30,386
- 2024/25: ▲32,222
- 2025/26: ▲33,194
Location
- Location within North Yorkshire
Notes
- Passenger statistics from the Office of Rail and Road

Marton is a railway station on the Esk Valley Line, which runs between Middlesbrough and Whitby via Nunthorpe. The station, situated 2 miles 79 chains (4.8 km) south-east of Middlesbrough, serves the suburbs of Marton, Middlesbrough and Ormesby, Redcar and Cleveland in North Yorkshire, England. It is owned by Network Rail and managed by Northern Trains.

== History ==
The station was opened as Ormesby on 25 February 1854 by the Middlesbrough and Guisborough Railway. It was renamed Marton by British Rail on 17 May 1982.

The nearby station, James Cook, was opened on 18 May 2014, and serves James Cook University Hospital.

=== Tees Valley Metro ===
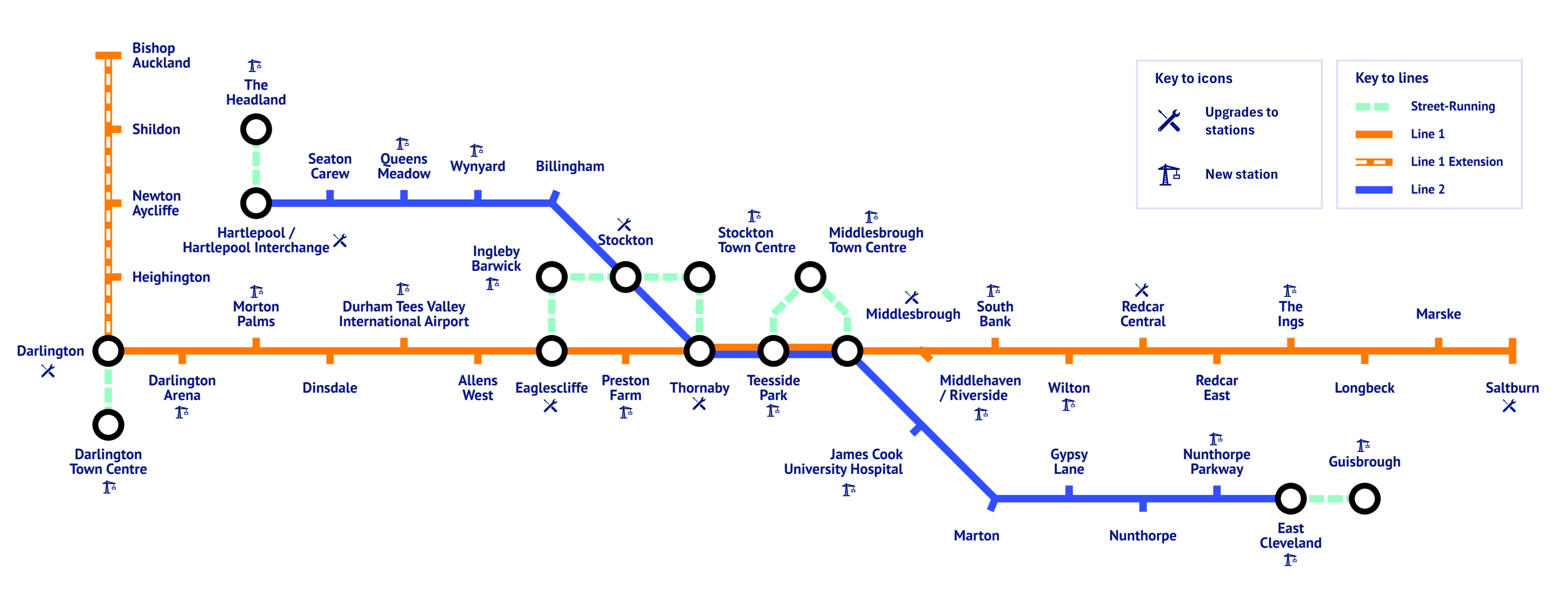
Transit diagram showcasing all discussed or mentioned ideas for the Tees Valley Metro.

Starting in 2006, Marton was mentioned within the Tees Valley Metro scheme. This was a plan to upgrade the Tees Valley Line and sections of the Esk Valley Line and Durham Coast Line to provide a faster and more frequent service across the North East of England. In the initial phases the services would have been heavy rail mostly along existing alignments with new additional infrastructure and rollingstock. The later phase would have introduced tram-trains to allow street running and further heavy rail extensions.

As part of the scheme, Marton station would have received improved service to Nunthorpe and Hartlepool, possibly a street-running link to Guisborough and the Headland, as well as new rollingstock.

However, due to a change in government in 2010 and the 2008 financial crisis, the project was ultimately shelved. Several stations eventually got their improvements including Marton, and there is a possibility of improved rollingstock and services in the future which may affect Marton.

== Facilities ==
Station facilities were upgraded in 2012 as part of the Tees Valley Metro project. The package for the station included a new fully lit waiting shelter, renewed station signage and the installation of CCTV. A long-line public address system (PA) was also installed, with pre-recorded train announcements.

A passenger information screen with details of train times was installed at the station in March 2016. A ticket machine was installed at the station in 2019. The station has a limited number of car parking spaces.

== Services ==
Following the May 2021 timetable change, the station is served by an hourly service between Middlesbrough and Nunthorpe, with two trains per day (excluding Sunday) continuing to Battersby, and five per day (four on Sunday) continuing to Whitby. Most trains continue to Newcastle via Hartlepool. All services are operated by Northern Trains.

Rolling stock used: Class 156 Super Sprinter and Class 158 Express Sprinter

== Sources ==
- Suggitt, G. (2005). Lost Railways of North & East Yorkshire. Countryside Books. ISBN 1-85306-918-3.

Preceding station	National Rail	Following station
James Cook	Northern Trains; Esk Valley Line	Gypsy Lane
	Disused railways	
Middlesbrough	North Eastern Railway; Middlesbrough and Guisborough Railway	Nunthorpe
