= Nunthorpe =

Village and civil parish in North Yorkshire, England

Coordinates: 54.5287°N 1.1770°W

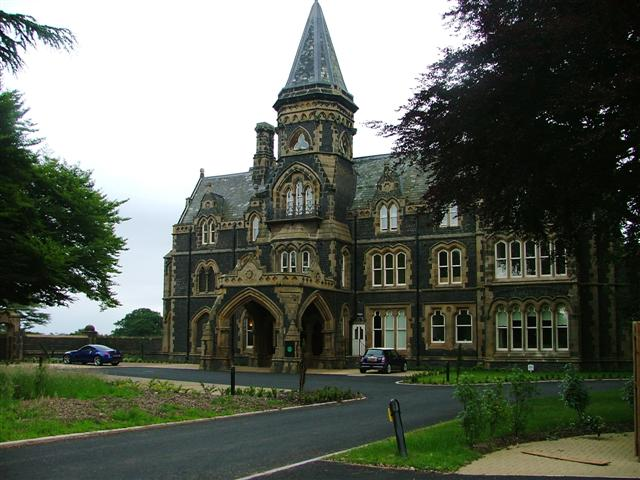
- Grey Towers built in 1865 by a Middlesbrough ironmaster, William Randolph Innis Hopkins.

- Location within North Yorkshire
- Population: 4,866 (2011 Census)
- OS grid reference: NZ532151
- Civil parish: Nunthorpe (part)
- Unitary authority: Middlesbrough
- Ceremonial county: North Yorkshire
- Region: North East
- Country: England
- Sovereign state: United Kingdom
- Post town: MIDDLESBROUGH
- Postcode district: TS7
- Dialling code: 01642
- Police: Cleveland
- Fire: Cleveland
- Ambulance: North East
- UK Parliament: Middlesbrough South and East Cleveland

Nunthorpe is a village and civil parish in the Borough of Middlesbrough in North Yorkshire, England.

It is part of the historic county of Yorkshire, North Riding. It is near to the village of Great Ayton and formerly part of the Ayton ancient parish until 1866.

== History ==
The history of Nunthorpe can be traced back to before the Domesday Book of 1086. The village was named “Thorpe”, or “Torp” (words meaning settlement) in the Domesday Book and described as a thriving settlement, Nunthorpe consisted of an estimated 1,080 acres of land. Towards the end of the 12th century a group of Cistercians nuns, allegedly evicted from nearby Hutton Lowcross for rowdy behaviour, were resettled at Thorpe having been given some land there belonging to Whitby Abbey, on which they built a priory and mill. The nuns only stayed at Thorpe a few years, but their short stay resulted in Thorpe being renamed Nunthorpe. During the following centuries, Nunthorpe remained an agricultural community closely linked to the market towns of Stokesley and Ayton. The Industrial Revolution had very little impact on its agricultural economy.

=== Victorian era ===
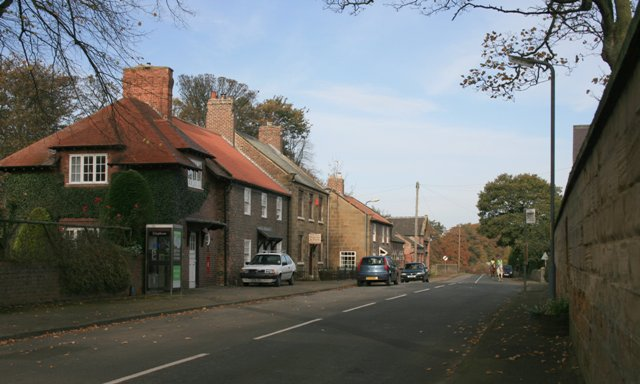
The village round the hall

The census of 1811 shows Nunthorpe to have had a population of 128, living either in the village of Nunthorpe or on nearby farms. Nunthorpe was at that time registered as being in the North Riding of York, in the Parish of Great Ayton. Its economy was all related to agriculture and farming. The rapid growth of Middlesbrough from a population of 35, in 1811, to a population of 91,302, in 1901 appeared to have had little effect on Nunthorpe, which kept its agricultural throughout the 19th century. Nunthorpe's population in comparison only reaching 198 persons by 1901.

In 1853, Middlesbrough and Guisborough Railway line opened, with a station at Nunthorpe and passenger services the following year. Several important Middlesbrough industrialists chose Nunthorpe as their home and contributed to the development of the village. These men included Isaac Wilson, ironmaster, Mayor of Middlesbrough and later Liberal MP, John Swan, ironmaster, William Hopkins, ironmaster and mayor of Middlesbrough and Sir Arthur Dorman, ironmaster.

=== 20th century ===
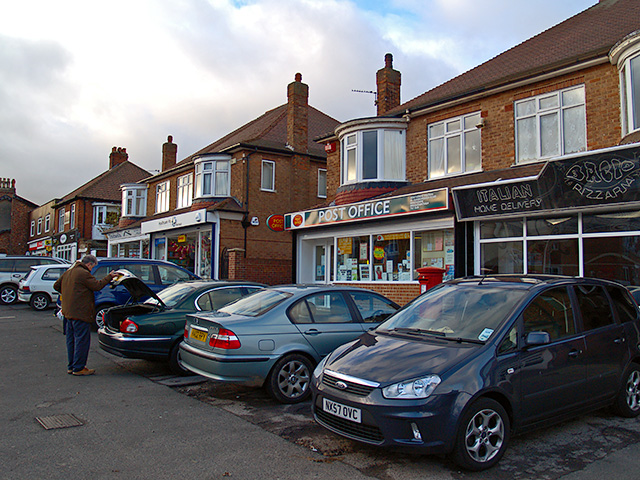
Shops east of the station

The settlement that is known as Nunthorpe today is that which grew up around the railway station. Nunthorpe village is situated about 1 mile (1.6 km) to the south of the main suburban area. In the early 20th Century, Sir Arthur Dorman planned and built a new small suburb around the railway station for his workers He imposed several covenants on the building: – shops were not permitted, public houses were also not allowed, the houses had to have slate roofs and were not permitted to have house numbers. The layout included tree-lined roads, with spacious houses, each with a garden built in terraces. The houses were certainly an improvement on the small workers’ houses built in Middlesbrough. By 1912, about 60 houses had been built around the station area of Nunthorpe.

==== 1950s to the present ====
New housing estates, schools and churches were built during the late 1950s, 1960s and 1970s.. The historical development of Nunthorpe initially started with the building of generously sized houses in generous gardens. This has given Nunthorpe its continued heritage with an open and spacious character.

== Governance ==
The village was merged into the County Borough of Teesside from the Stokesley Rural District in 1968. It was split between the boroughs of Middlesbrough and Langbaurgh (in 1996 the latter was later renamed Redcar and Cleveland) by the Local Government Act 1972 in 1974, the Esk Valley Line as a boundary, with its civil parish on the Middlesbrough side. In the same ward as the western part of the village, Ormesby was also split between the two boroughs.

=== 2023 local elections results for Ormesby Ward ===
In the 2023 local elections, the following members were returned to Redcar and Cleveland Borough Council:

Ward	Councillor	Party
Ormesby	Ian Hart	Liberal Democrats
Ormesby	Carole Morgan	Liberal Democrats
Ormesby	Glyn Nightingale	Liberal Democrats

=== 2023 local elections results for Nunthorpe Ward ===
In the 2023 local elections, the following members were returned to Middlesbrough Borough Council:

Ward	Councillor	Party
Nunthorpe	Morgan McClintock	Liberal Democrats
Nunthorpe	Mieka Smiles	Conservatives

== Landmarks ==
=== Nunthorpe Hall ===
Nunthorpe Hall is the ancient manor house in Nunthorpe village. It was built in 1623, and largely rebuilt and extended in around 1800 and altered again in the mid-1800s. The entrance porch and was added in 1901. The building was converted into a retirement home for the elderly in 1951. The main building is of dressed sandstone, with Lakeland slate roofs, with stone ridge copings. It became a Grade II, listed building, in 1952.

=== Churches ===
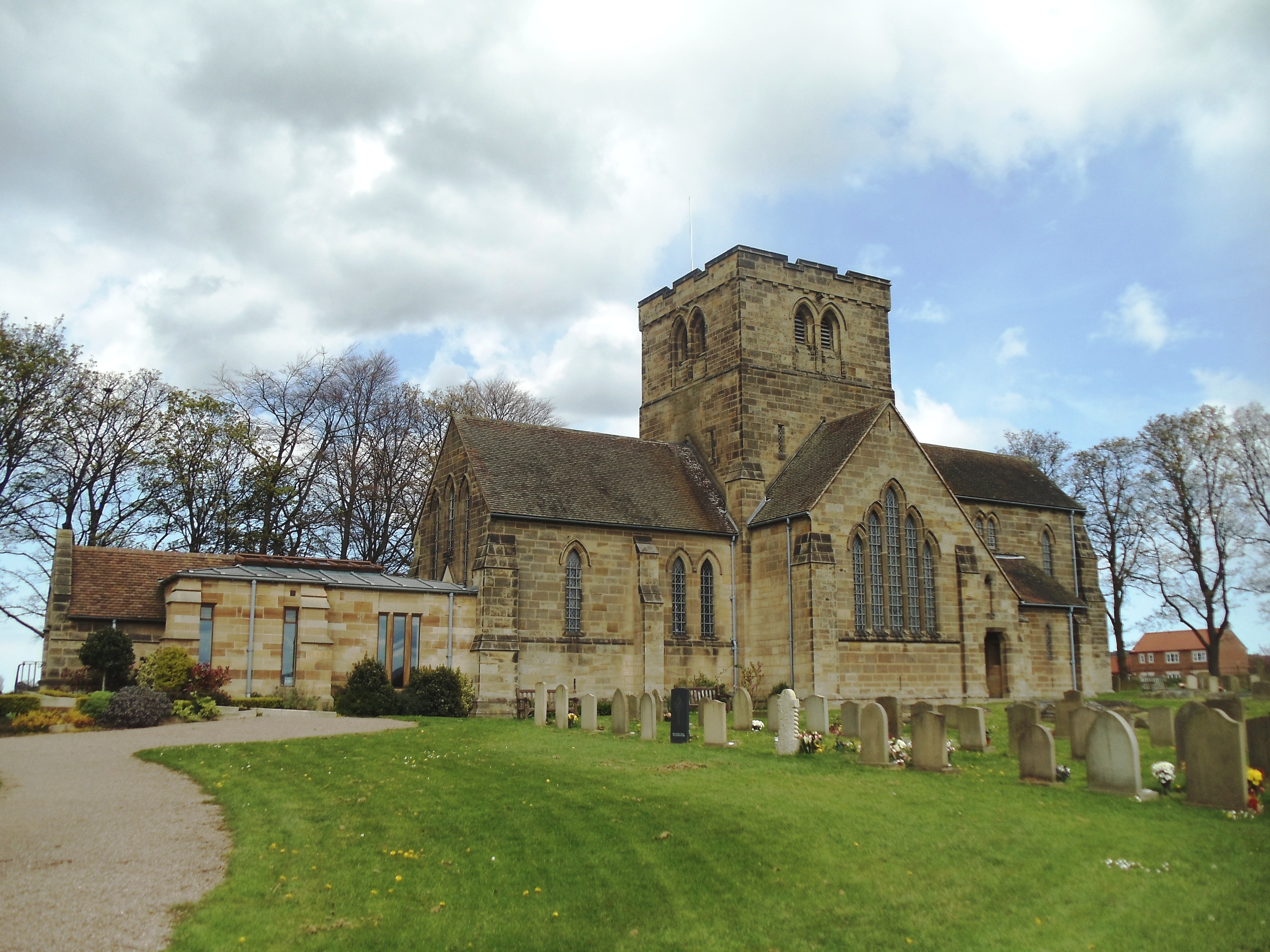
St Mary's church

- Church of England – St Mary the Virgin, church on Church Lane (Middlesbrough side) and church hall on Morton Carr Lane (Redcar and Cleveland borough side)
- Methodist – Nunthorpe Methodist Church, Marton Moor Road
- Catholic – St Bernadette's Catholic Church, Gypsy Lane

=== Grey Towers ===
Grey Towers House is a large house, built in 1865 for William Hopkins, Mayor of Middlesbrough. It has an unusual aspect in that it is faced with whinstone, compared to the traditional sandstone of the area. Arthur Dorman, of the steel makers Dorman Long, lived there until his death in 1931.

Alderman Sir Thomas Gibson Poole bought the estate and presented it to Middlesbrough Council as a tuberculosis sanatorium, known first as Poole Sanatorium, and later as Poole Hospital. It was opened as a hospital, first in 1932, and expanded with further buildings, in 1945. It closed as a hospital in 1988. In 1988, it also became a Grade II* listed building. In 2005, Grey Towers Hall was refurbished into 12 apartments

=== Retail ===
A parade of local shops can be found on Guisborough Road including a florist, pharmacy and post office with local newsagent Rookwood News found on nearby Rookwood Road. The Avenue shops also serve the village.

== Education ==
Nunthorpe is served by four primary schools; Chandlers Ridge Academy, The Avenue, Nunthorpe and St Bernadette's Catholic School. Situated next to Nunthorpe Primary School is Nunthorpe Academy, a Specialist Science, Business and Enterprise Academy (since 2012). It operated as a selective County Modern school prior to 1973 and then as a Comprehensive school.

Since September 2008, there has been a Sixth Form College located next to the secondary school, in collaboration with a campus in Teesville.

== Transport ==
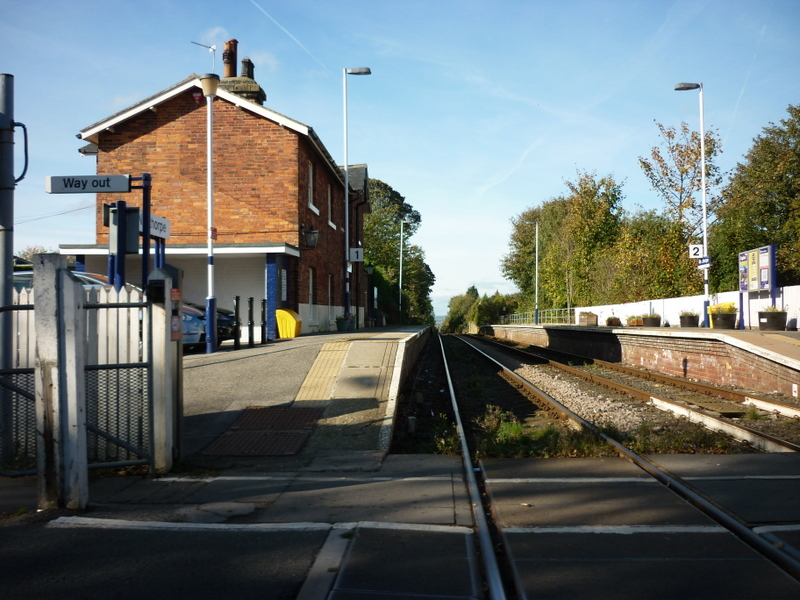
Nunthorpe railway station

Nunthorpe is served by both Gypsy Lane and Nunthorpe railway stations, which are on the Esk Valley Line, Middlesbrough station to Whitby. Nunthorpe has good bus connections to Middlesbrough and Guisborough. It is located close to main roads like the A174 and A19.

== Sport and culture ==
Nunthorpe has a squash and football club, complete with squash and tennis courts; there is also a cricket club. The Cleveland Hills can be seen as the backdrop to this local amenity, with Roseberry Topping clearly visible.

An amateur drama group, The Nunthorpe Players, founded in 1962, regularly performs at St. Mary's Church Hall in Nunthorpe.

== Notable people ==
- Anand Desai-Barochia – actor Emmerdale, Bridgerton, The Outpost
- Ben Gibson – footballer.
- Peter Gilmore – actor (BBC television series The Onedin Line)
- Chris Liddle – cricketer who went to school in Nunthorpe.
- Amelia Lily – singer (X Factor 2011 finalist) and Celebrity Big Brother 20 housemate.
- Graeme Murty – footballer who went to school in Nunthorpe.
- Kirsten O'Brien – media presenter.
- Liam Plunkett – cricketer who went to school in Nunthorpe.
- Chris Tomlinson – long jumper.
- Jonathan Woodgate – footballer and football manager.
