= Nunthorpe Academy =

Location
- Guisborough Road, Nunthorpe; Middlesbrough, North Yorkshire, TS7 0LA; England; 54.53193°N 1.16305°W

Information
- Type: Academy
- Religious affiliation: Non-religious
- Established: 1964 as Nunthorpe Secondary School; 2012 as Nunthorpe Academy
- Local authority: Redcar and Cleveland
- Trust: Nunthorpe Multi Academy Trust
- Department for Education URN: 138845 Tables
- Ofsted: Reports
- Chair: Brian Whitfield
- Age range: 11–18
- Enrolment: 1410
- Houses: Endeavour, Invincible, Triumph, Valiant, Victory
- Colour: Navy Blue
- Website: nunthorpe.co.uk

Nunthorpe Academy is an 11–18 Specialist Science, Business and Enterprise Academy in Nunthorpe, Middlesbrough, North Yorkshire, England. Houses are Endeavour, Triumph, Valiant, Victory, and Invincible. 1,410 students are currently enrolled at the academy.

== History ==
The building was originally opened as Nunthorpe Secondary School in 1964. The school was opened next door to Nunthorpe Primary School, which was constructed in 1960.

In 2008, the school opened a sixth form, which shares its design with Outwood Normanby's sixth form building.

Fiona Harrington is the current head of Nunthorpe Sixth Form.

Nunthorpe School converted to Academy status on 1 October 2012. The aforementioned Nunthorpe Primary School would itself achieve academy status on 1 June 2014.

== Notable pupils ==
- Aimee Willmott, Olympic swimmer
- Chris Tomlinson, Olympic long jumper and former British long jump record holder
- Jonathan Woodgate, former professional footballer who played for several clubs, including Real Madrid, Middlesbrough and Newcastle United
- Kirsten O'Brien, Television presenter and radio host best known for hosting children's TV
- Mattie Pollock, professional footballer who plays for Watford as a defender
- Jordan Hugill, professional footballer who has played for West Ham United and Middlesbrough

== Awards ==
A former headteacher of Nunthorpe School, Sir John Rowling, received a knighthood, in 2003, for services to education.

Nunthorpe Academy holds the Ofsted rating of "Requires Improvement" since 2024; this was downgraded from "Good", awarded in 2019. This in itself was downgraded from "Outstanding", awarded in 2013.
