= Great Ayton railway station =

Railway station in North Yorkshire, England

Great Ayton
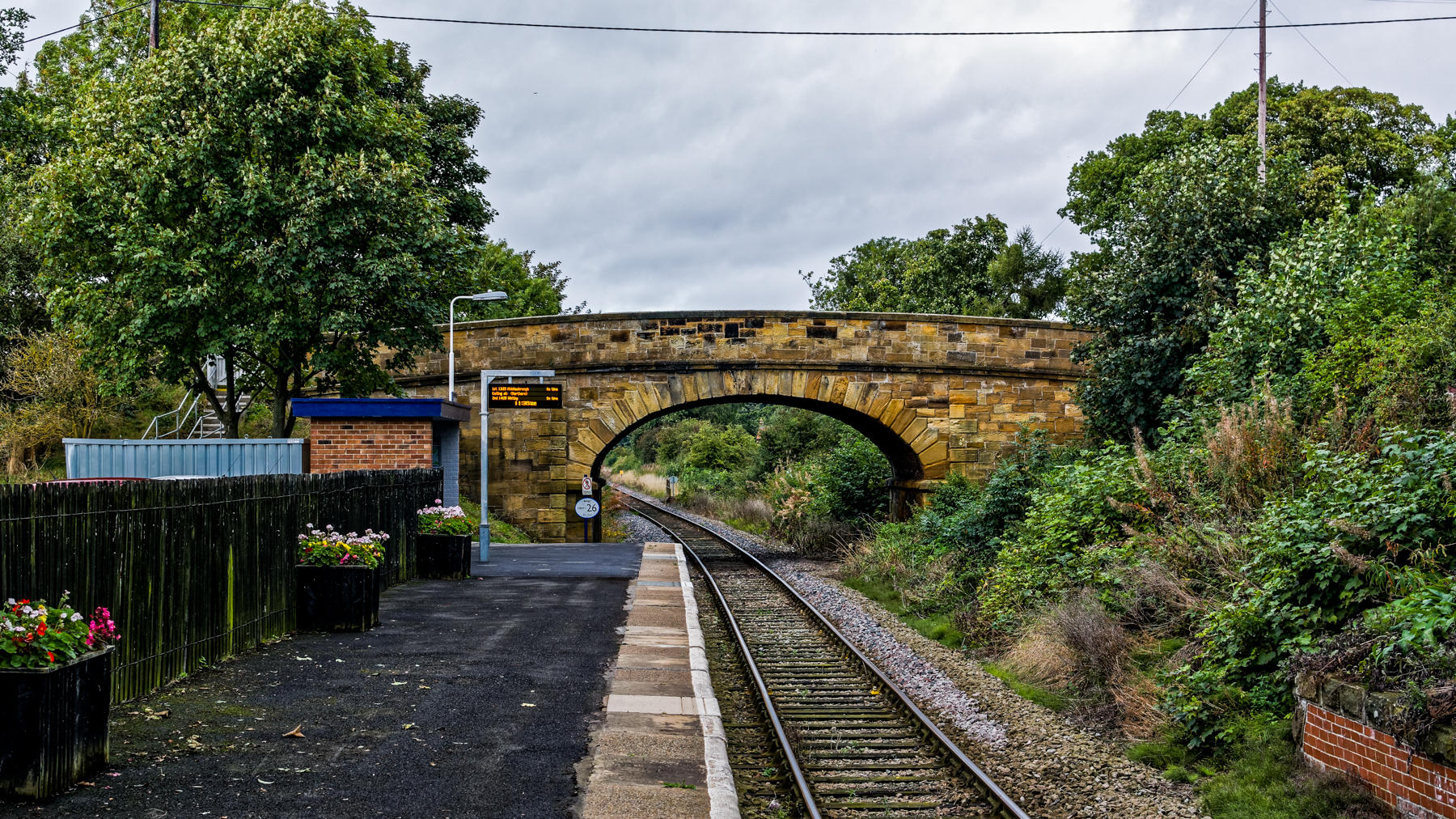

General information
- Location: Great Ayton, North Yorkshire; England
- Coordinates: 54°29′22″N 1°06′54″W
- Grid reference: NZ574108
- Owner: Network Rail
- Manager: Northern Trains
- Platforms: 1
- Tracks: 1

Other information
- Station code: GTA
- Classification: DfT category F2

History
- Original company: North Eastern Railway
- Pre-grouping: North Eastern Railway
- Post-grouping: London and North Eastern Railway; British Rail (North Eastern Region)

Key dates
- 1 April 1868: Opened as Ayton
- 1874: Renamed Great Ayton

Passengers
- 2021/22: ▲8,662
- 2022/23: ▲10,118
- 2023/24: ▲12,360
- 2024/25: ▲13,508
- 2025/26: ▲16,392
Location
- Location within North Yorkshire
Notes
- Passenger statistics from the Office of Rail and Road

Great Ayton is a railway station on the Esk Valley Line, which runs between Middlesbrough and Whitby via Nunthorpe. The station, situated 8 miles 37 chains (13.6 km) south-east of Middlesbrough, serves the village of Great Ayton in North Yorkshire, England. It is owned by Network Rail and managed by Northern Trains.

== History ==
On 1 June 1864, the North Eastern Railway opened a short line which linked Battersby, on their route between Picton and Grosmont, with Nunthorpe on the Middlesbrough and Guisborough Railway – a subsidiary of the Stockton and Darlington Railway.

This link line was initially used solely by mineral trains. Passenger trains along the route began four years later, and a station at Great Ayton was opened on 1 April 1868.

The station is on the single track rail line between Nunthorpe and Battersby and there are only a few trains per day. The goods yard at the station closed down in July 1965 along with many other stations on the Esk Valley line. Until the 1950s, trains used to run from the station to Stokesley, Whitby Town and Middlesbrough but only the latter two destinations are now served.

Next to Great Ayton station is the village garage and towing service. The station had, until 1934, a full station building complete with booking office and waiting room, this however was demolished to save costs.

== Services ==
As of the December 2025 timetable change, the station is served by five trains per day on Mondays to Saturdays and four on Sundays towards Whitby. Heading towards Middlesbrough via Nunthorpe, there are eight trains per day on Mondays to Saturdays, with three continuing to Newcastle via Hartlepool, and four on Sundays, with two continuing to Darlington. All services are operated by Northern Trains.

Rolling stock used: Class 156 Super Sprinter and Class 158 Express Sprinter

Preceding station	National Rail	Following station
Nunthorpe	Northern Trains; Esk Valley Line	Battersby
