= Esk Valley line =

Railway line between Middlesbrough and Whitby, England

Coordinates: 54.579°N 1.235°W

Esk Valley Line
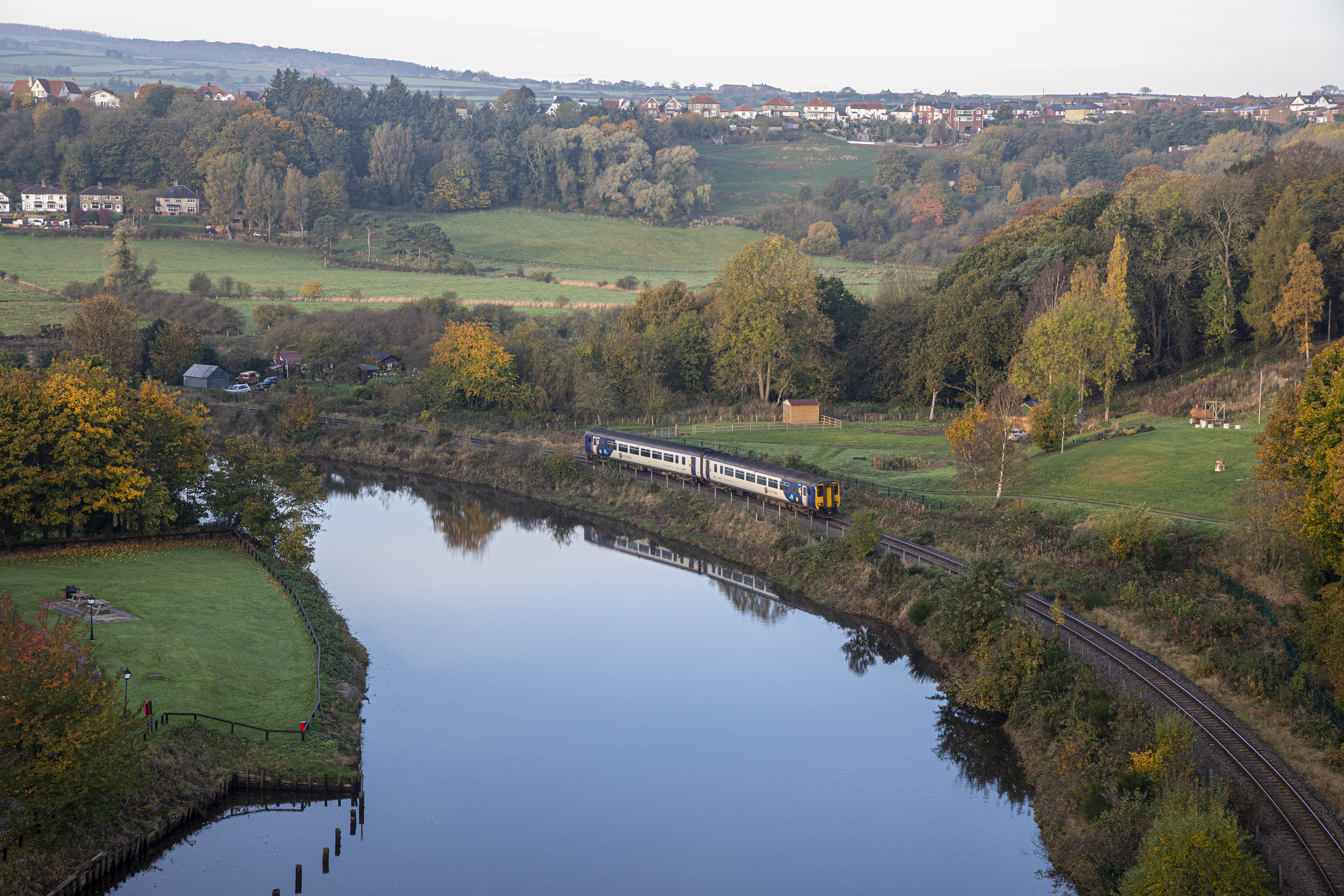
- A Class 156 DMU between Ruswarp and Whitby

Overview
- Status: Operational
- Owner: National Rail
- Locale: North Yorkshire Teesside
- Termini: Middlesbrough; Whitby
- Stations: 17

Service
- Type: Heavy rail
- System: National Rail
- Operator: Northern Trains
- Rolling stock: Class 156; Class 158

History
- Opened: From 1835

Technical
- Line length: 35 miles (56 km)
- Track gauge: 4 ft 8 1/2 in (1,435 mm)
Route map
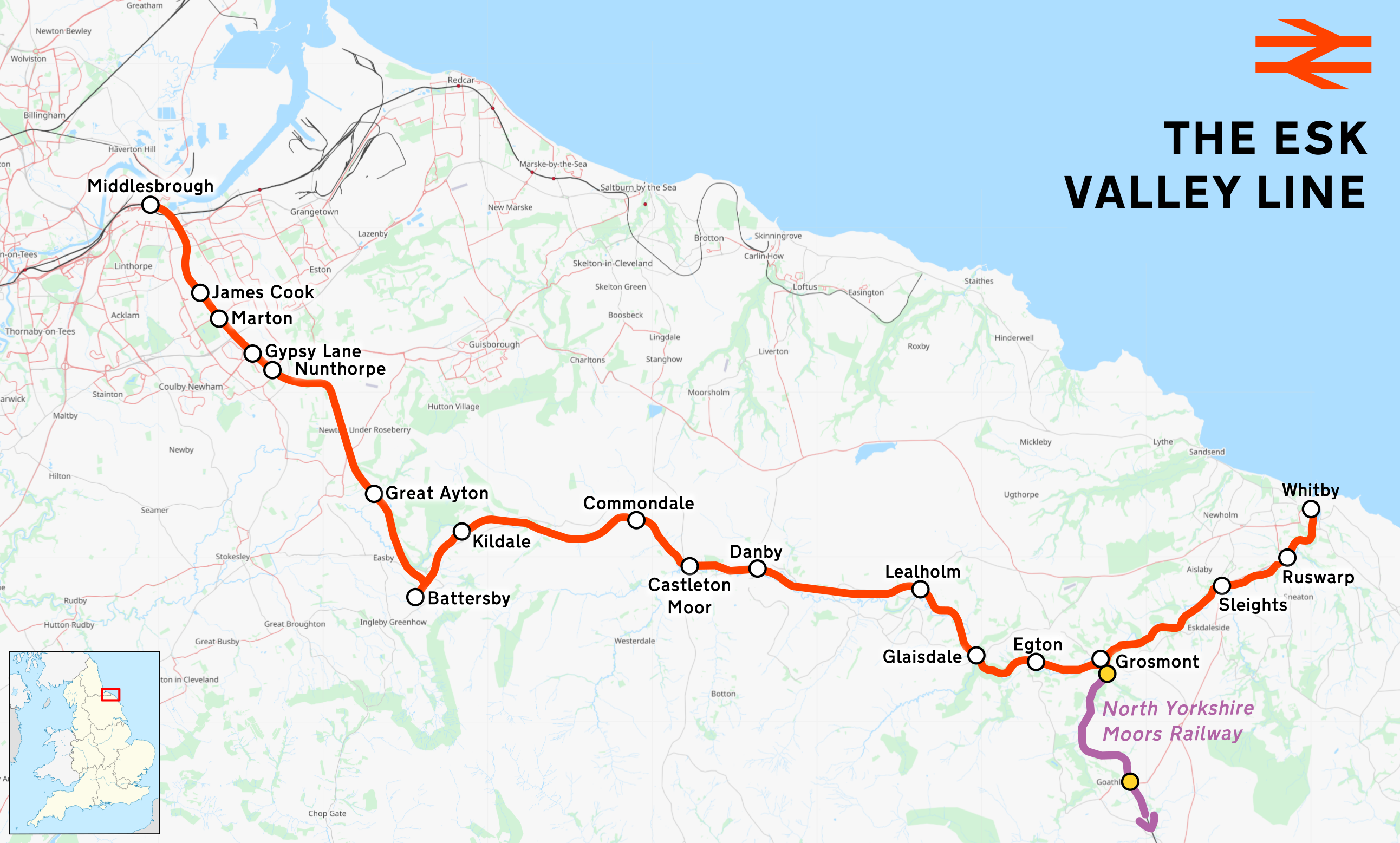
(Click to expand)

The Esk Valley Line is a railway line located in the north of England, covering a total distance of approximately 35 miles (56 km), running from Middlesbrough to Whitby. The line follows the course of the River Esk for much of its eastern half.

The Esk Valley Line was designated as a community rail line in July 2005, being one of seven intended pilots for the Department for Transport's Community Rail Development Strategy.

Northern Trains' services call at all stations along the line, with the North Yorkshire Moors Railway operating heritage services along part of the line between Grosmont and Whitby.

== History ==
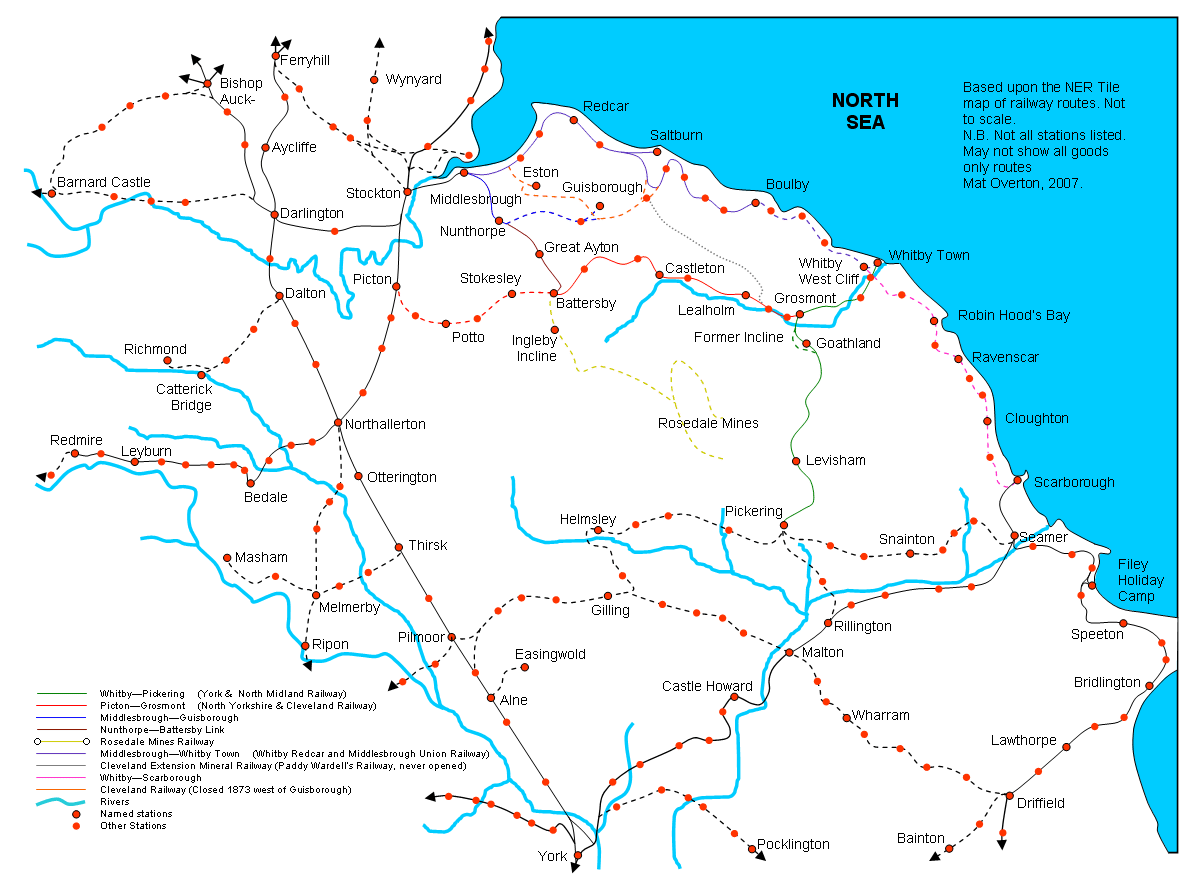
The pre-Beeching railway network across the North York Moors

The Esk Valley Line was once part of a significantly larger network, most of which was closed during the era of the Beeching cuts. Today's route is formed from four separate former railway lines:

=== Whitby Town to Grosmont ===
The first section of line between Whitby Town and Grosmont opened in 1835, with an extension to Pickering opening on 26 May 1836. It was originally worked by horses, before being converted in 1845, in order to be able to accommodate steam locomotives, following a takeover by the York & North Midland Railway. In 1854, the line became a part of the North Eastern Railway.

The section between Grosmont and Pickering was closed under the Beeching cuts in 1965, but was one of the first to be taken into private hands as a heritage line, the North Yorkshire Moors Railway.

From Whitby Town, a single track branched up a steep incline to Prospect Hill Junction, from which trains could reach Whitby West Cliff. From there, trains would journey north along the coastal Whitby, Redcar & Middlesbrough Union Railway towards Staithes and Loftus, and south across the Larpool Viaduct towards Scarborough.

The Whitby, Redcar and Middlesbrough Union Railway was closed in the 1950s. However, the northern section of the line was retained, with services still operating between Middlesbrough and Saltburn Between Saltburn and Boulby, the line is also still operational, but as a goods route for potash and rock salt from Boulby Mine.

Following the closure of the Whitby, Redcar & Middlesbrough Union Railway, additional services began to operate along the Esk Valley Line. In the summer of 1957, the line served just six trains per day. By the summer of 1958, there were 15, with six continuing to Scarborough.

=== Grosmont to Battersby ===
The second line ran east from Picton, where it met the Northallerton to Eaglescliffe Line. It was constructed by the North Yorkshire & Cleveland Railway, which was subsequently absorbed into the North Eastern Railway in 1858. The line was built in stages, opening to mineral traffic as far as Battersby on 6 April 1858 and to passenger traffic from Stokesley to Castleton Moor on 1 April 1861. The section between Grosmont and Castleton Moor was the last section of the line to be opened, with service commencing on 2 October 1865.

The section between Battersby and Picton closed to passengers in 1954.

From Battersby, goods trains also ran south to Ingleby where a cable pulley system raised wagons up a steep incline, and across the North York Moors to iron ore workings at Rosedale and Farndale.

Between Glaisdale and Lealholm, work was begun by the railway engineer John Waddell on a branch across the North York Moors, to make the most of the iron ore in the area. Originally intended to meet the line from Guisborough, which branched off the Whitby, Redcar & Middlesbrough Union Railway near Boulby, a collapse in the price of iron ore meant the line was never finished. At various points along the route, the remains of vast earthworks forming unfinished embankments and cuttings can be seen. The line was to have one station at Stonegate and nearby a tunnel dug using the cut and cover method. The only bridge completed on the line is at Rake Farm, between Lealholm and Glaisdale, at the route's junction with the Esk Valley Line.

The line is still known today as "Paddy Waddell's Railway", due to the number of Irish navvies used in its construction.

Today, Battersby is served by only one railway line, but it still takes the shape of a Y junction with trains pulling into a station that is now effectively a terminus. The old line towards Picton continues on through the station and disappears around a bend before ending. The driver has to change ends to drive towards either Middlesbrough or Whitby.

=== Battersby to Nunthorpe ===
The section of the Esk Valley Line between Battersby and Nunthorpe is the youngest section of the route. The line was constructed in 1864, with the aim of connecting the Picton to Grosmont line with the Middlesbrough to Guisborough line.

The line leaves Battersby heading east with the route towards Grosmont, before making a sharp turn north, to reach the now former line towards Guisborough at Nunthorpe Junction.

=== Nunthorpe to Middlesbrough ===
This section of line was constructed by the Middlesbrough and Guisborough Railway in 1854, to serve the town of Guisborough, and the area around the Eston Hills.

A line was constructed heading south from Middlesbrough and through Nunthorpe, from where it curved east to Guisborough and then on towards the coast to join the Whitby, Redcar and Middlesbrough Union Railway. It also served a number of quarries in the area.

Despite its close proximity to the Picton to Battersby line, it was another ten years before a link was built between the two. The line from Nunthorpe Junction to Guisborough closed in 1964, with only the section from Middlesbrough to Battersby remaining.

A new station, James Cook, opened on this section of the line in May 2014. It was built to serve the nearby James Cook University Hospital in Middlesbrough.

== Signalling and infrastructure ==
The Esk Valley Line still uses a physical token system, modified so that train drivers operate the token instruments themselves. This system of working is known as No Signalman Token Remote and is used on other routes such as the Heart of Wales line and the Tarka Line.

Cabinets at Whitby, Glaisdale and Battersby, and a signalman at Nunthorpe, pass on key tokens to train drivers as authority to occupy specific line sections, ensuring that only one train can run on a section at a time.

Until the mid-1980s, the line from Whitby to Sleights had two tracks, but these were removed along with the passing loop at Castleton Moor. Trains can still pass at Glaisdale and Battersby, however Glaisdale is now the only station along the single tracked section that still regularly uses both platforms for up and down line trains.

Between Nunthorpe and Guisborough Junction, the railway has been single-tracked since 26 January 1986; however, the station at Nunthorpe still retains its passing loop with separate up and down platforms. This section is worked from the Rail Operating Centre at York (since 2021) and uses track circuit block working.

== Steam operations ==
The North Yorkshire Moors Railway operates heritage steam trains between Whitby and Grosmont.

To allow through running of trains directly from the North Yorkshire Moors Line, an intermediate token instrument was provided at Grosmont in March 2007. This allows a token for the Glaisdale to Whitby section to be obtained, or returned, at Grosmont.

Previously, for steam services to Whitby to operate along the Esk Valley Line from the North Yorkshire Moors Railway, a signalman had to drive to Glaisdale in order to pick up, or return, a token key.

== Passenger numbers ==
Between 2005 (when the Community Rail Partnership was formed) and May 2018, passenger numbers have increased steadily, especially on the Middlesbrough to Nunthorpe section of the track aided by an increase in the frequency of trains. Northern Trains and the Community Rail Partnership have predicted further increases in passenger numbers, following the addition of new services in December 2019.

=== Station usage ===
| Station usage (April–March) | Middlesbrough | James Cook (Note: James Cook station opened on 18 May 2014) | Marton | Gypsy Lane | Nunthorpe | Great Ayton | Battersby | Kildale | Commondale | Castleton Moor | Danby | Lealholm | Glaisdale | Egton | Grosmont | Sleights | Ruswarp | Whitby |
|---|---|---|---|---|---|---|---|---|---|---|---|---|---|---|---|---|---|---|
| 2005–06 | 1,200,737 | – | 3,076 | 11,412 | 12,406 | 4,405 | 1,653 | 1,664 | 2,976 | 7,174 | 21,899 | 16,688 | 26,887 | 13,546 | 18,675 | 3,733 | 2,585 | 132,956 |
| 2006–07 | 1,242,054 ▲ | – | 3,833 ▲ | 12,020 ▲ | 13,747 ▲ | 4,738 ▲ | 1,711 ▲ | 2,160 ▲ | 2,959 ▼ | 6,062 ▼ | 18,760 ▼ | 15,706 ▼ | 26,355 ▼ | 11,292 ▼ | 18,264 ▼ | 3,480 ▼ | 2,301 ▼ | 127,428 ▼ |
| 2007–08 | 1,300,713 ▲ | – | 4,825 ▲ | 12,820 ▲ | 16,775 ▲ | 5,666 ▲ | 2,028 ▲ | 2,486 ▲ | 2,974 ▲ | 5,613 ▼ | 12,560 ▼ | 13,044 ▼ | 22,276 ▼ | 10,798 ▼ | 24,273 ▲ | 3,976 ▲ | 2,696 ▲ | 127,739 ▲ |
| 2008–09 | 1,349,420 ▲ | – | 6,894 ▲ | 18,430 ▲ | 23,208 ▲ | 5,650 ▼ | 1,806 ▼ | 2,308 ▼ | 3,142 ▲ | 5,172 ▼ | 9,710 ▼ | 15,554 ▲ | 20,284 ▼ | 12,414 ▲ | 19,718 ▼ | 3,884 ▼ | 3,054 ▲ | 120,594 ▼ |
| 2009–10 | 1,354,030 ▲ | – | 8,750 ▲ | 20,234 ▲ | 23,828 ▲ | 6,134 ▲ | 2,012 ▲ | 2,006 ▼ | 2,858 ▼ | 5,544 ▲ | 11,370 ▲ | 16,242 ▲ | 18,686 ▼ | 11,110 ▼ | 22,048 ▲ | 4,334 ▲ | 2,606 ▼ | 126,240 ▲ |
| 2010–11 | 1,426,350 ▲ | – | 9,804 ▲ | 23,566 ▲ | 24,914 ▲ | 6,798 ▲ | 1,476 ▼ | 1,992 ▼ | 3,972 ▲ | 5,164 ▼ | 10,878 ▼ | 17,972 ▲ | 21,222 ▲ | 9,430 ▼ | 22,964 ▲ | 4,292 ▼ | 2,722 ▲ | 133,940 ▲ |
| 2011–12 | 1,423,134 ▼ | – | 9,130 ▼ | 22,692 ▼ | 22,302 ▼ | 6,904 ▲ | 1,504 ▲ | 2,018 ▲ | 5,000 ▲ | 5,030 ▼ | 11,622 ▲ | 20,010 ▲ | 18,564 ▼ | 10,562 ▲ | 23,662 ▲ | 4,592 ▲ | 2,974 ▲ | 140,158 ▲ |
| 2012–13 | 1,364,250 ▼ | – | 9,862 ▲ | 21,900 ▼ | 22,600 ▲ | 5,738 ▼ | 1,574 ▲ | 1,822 ▼ | 4,852 ▼ | 4,850 ▼ | 9,902 ▼ | 11,422 ▼ | 11,194 ▼ | 7,388 ▼ | 16,376 ▼ | 4,378 ▼ | 2,946 ▼ | 107,940 ▼ |
| 2013–14 | 1,370,172 ▲ | – | 10,576 ▲ | 23,716 ▲ | 24,203 ▲ | 6,826 ▲ | 1,592 ▲ | 1,960 ▲ | 5,026 ▲ | 4,892 ▲ | 10,836 ▲ | 17,662 ▲ | 15,216 ▲ | 11,568 ▲ | 17,912 ▲ | 4,426 ▲ | 3,032 ▲ | 133,680 ▲ |
| 2014–15 | 1,351,494 ▼ | 23,176 | 10,568 ▼ | 26,398 ▲ | 32,510 ▲ | 7,776 ▲ | 1,488 ▼ | 1,824 ▼ | 4,602 ▼ | 4,858 ▼ | 8,440 ▼ | 15,888 ▼ | 15,046 ▼ | 10,812 ▼ | 16,144 ▼ | 5,040 ▲ | 3,228 ▲ | 130,210 ▼ |
| 2015–16 | 1,331,452 ▼ | 31,578 ▲ | 13,512 ▲ | 30,338 ▲ | 35,766 ▲ | 7,100 ▼ | 1,458 ▼ | 1,610 ▼ | 5,232 ▲ | 4,930 ▲ | 7,084 ▼ | 18,102 ▲ | 18,754 ▲ | 13,724 ▲ | 15,172 ▼ | 4,122 ▼ | 2,966 ▼ | 137,196 ▲ |
| 2016–17 | 1,356,282 ▲ | 31,402 ▼ | 13,696 ▲ | 32,996 ▲ | 35,814 ▲ | 6,890 ▼ | 1,660 ▲ | 1,416 ▼ | 3,754 ▼ | 5,444 ▲ | 6,334 ▼ | 17,358 ▼ | 18,298 ▼ | 12,088 ▼ | 13,514 ▼ | 4,188 ▲ | 2,568 ▼ | 131,810 ▼ |
| 2017–18 | 1,312,916 ▼ | 33,774 ▲ | 13,356 ▼ | 33,298 ▲ | 34,596 ▼ | 7,322 ▲ | 1,564 ▼ | 1,630 ▲ | 1,888 ▼ | 6,182 ▲ | 6,810 ▲ | 16,298 ▼ | 20,140 ▲ | 12,878 ▲ | 13,912 ▲ | 4,245 ▲ | 2,686 ▲ | 138,492 ▲ |
| 2018–19 | 1,289,866 ▼ | 37,080 ▲ | 14,774 ▲ | 31,204 ▼ | 36,346 ▲ | 7,726 ▲ | 1,520 ▼ | 1,468 ▼ | 2,344 ▲ | 4,928 ▼ | 6,184 ▼ | 15,250 ▼ | 23,316 ▲ | 11,698 ▼ | 12,390 ▼ | 4,182 ▼ | 2,404 ▼ | 130,900 ▼ |
| 2019–20 | 1,312,402 ▲ | 40,226 ▲ | 25,808 ▲ | 37,046 ▲ | 44,576 ▲ | 8,614 ▲ | 1,760 ▲ | 1,498 ▲ | 2,444 ▲ | 5,014 ▲ | 6,796 ▲ | 15,168 ▼ | 20,920 ▼ | 13,206 ▲ | 13,912 ▲ | 4,732 ▲ | 3,064 ▲ | 135,238 ▲ |
| 2020–21 | 342,770 ▼ | 9,280 ▼ | 5,294 ▼ | 6,982 ▼ | 7,618 ▼ | 2,064 ▼ | 396 ▼ | 386 ▼ | 434 ▼ | 1,258 ▼ | 1,132 ▼ | 8,726 ▼ | 16,396 ▼ | 6,166 ▼ | 4,420 ▼ | 1,038 ▼ | 684 ▼ | 49,828 ▼ |
| 2021–22 | 1,210,906 ▲ | 26,744 ▲ | 19,638 ▲ | 30,056 ▲ | 35,758 ▲ | 8,662 ▲ | 2,736 ▲ | 1,276 ▲ | 2,446 ▲ | 4,732 ▲ | 4,400 ▲ | 8,834 ▲ | 18,194 ▲ | 10,240 ▲ | 11,454 ▲ | 4,696 ▲ | 3,054 ▲ | 119,638 ▲ |
| 2022–23 | 1,376,410 ▲ | 37,120 ▲ | 22,178 ▲ | 31,626 ▲ | 42,306 ▲ | 10,118 ▲ | 2,164 ▼ | 1,372 ▲ | 2,294 ▼ | 4,794 ▲ | 5,596 ▲ | 8,010 ▼ | 18,858 ▲ | 8,642 ▼ | 11,284 ▼ | 5,048 ▲ | 2,952 ▼ | 126,366 ▲ |
| 2023–24 | 1,466,884 ▲6.6% ▲ | 52,370 ▲41.1% ▲ | 30,386 ▲37.0% ▲ | 38,398 ▲21.4% ▲ | 54,080 ▲27.8% ▲ | 12,360 ▲22.2% ▲ | 2,268 ▲4.8% ▲ | 1,450 ▲5.7% ▲ | 2,224 ▼3.1% ▼ | 5,756 ▲20.1% ▲ | 7,414 ▲32.5% ▲ | 8,598 ▲7.3% ▲ | 19,178 ▲1.7% ▲ | 10,554 ▲22.1% ▲ | 12,374 ▲9.7% ▲ | 6,844 ▲35.6% ▲ | 4,002 ▲35.6% ▲ | 143,408 ▲13.5% ▲ |
| 2024–25 | 1,543,226 ▲5.2% ▲ | 60,804 ▲16.1% ▲ | 32,222 ▲6.0% ▲ | 44,024 ▲14.7% ▲ | 59,464 ▲10.0% ▲ | 13,508 ▲9.3% ▲ | 2,524 ▲11.3% ▲ | 1,672 ▲15.3% ▲ | 2,120 ▼4.7% ▼ | | | | | | | | | |

The annual passenger usage is based on sales of tickets in stated financial years from Office of Rail and Road estimates of station usage.

The statistics are for passengers arriving and departing from each station and cover twelve-month periods that start in April. Methodology may vary year on year. Usage from the 2020–21 period was significantly affected by the COVID-19 pandemic.

== Rolling stock ==
Predominantly, rolling stock on the Esk Valley Line consists of Class 156 Super Sprinter and Class 158 Express Sprinter diesel multiple units, both of which were introduced into service in the late 1980s. These units were refurbished in 2020, with upgrades including free WiFi, power sockets, on-board passenger information displays and an interior refresh.

Previously, Class 142 Pacer trains mostly served the line until they were withdrawn from passenger service in 2020.

== Services ==
As of the December 2019 timetable change, Northern Trains operates an hourly service between Middlesbrough and Nunthorpe, with five trains per day (four on Sundays) continuing to Whitby. Additional trains weekdays and Saturdays run on the Esk Valley Line from Middlesbrough to Great Ayton.

Connections with heritage services on the North Yorkshire Moors Railway are available at both Grosmont and Whitby.

== Future ==
A proposed park and ride station, located between Nunthorpe and Great Ayton, has been suggested by a joint project of local councils. Roseberry Parkway would aim to serve over 70,000 people and seek to encourage car drivers out of their cars to alleviate the gridlock on the roads leading into Middlesbrough. The project aims to increase services into Middlesbrough to half-hourly and double the number of trains on the line to Whitby.
