= Nunthorpe railway station =

Railway station in North Yorkshire, England

Nunthorpe
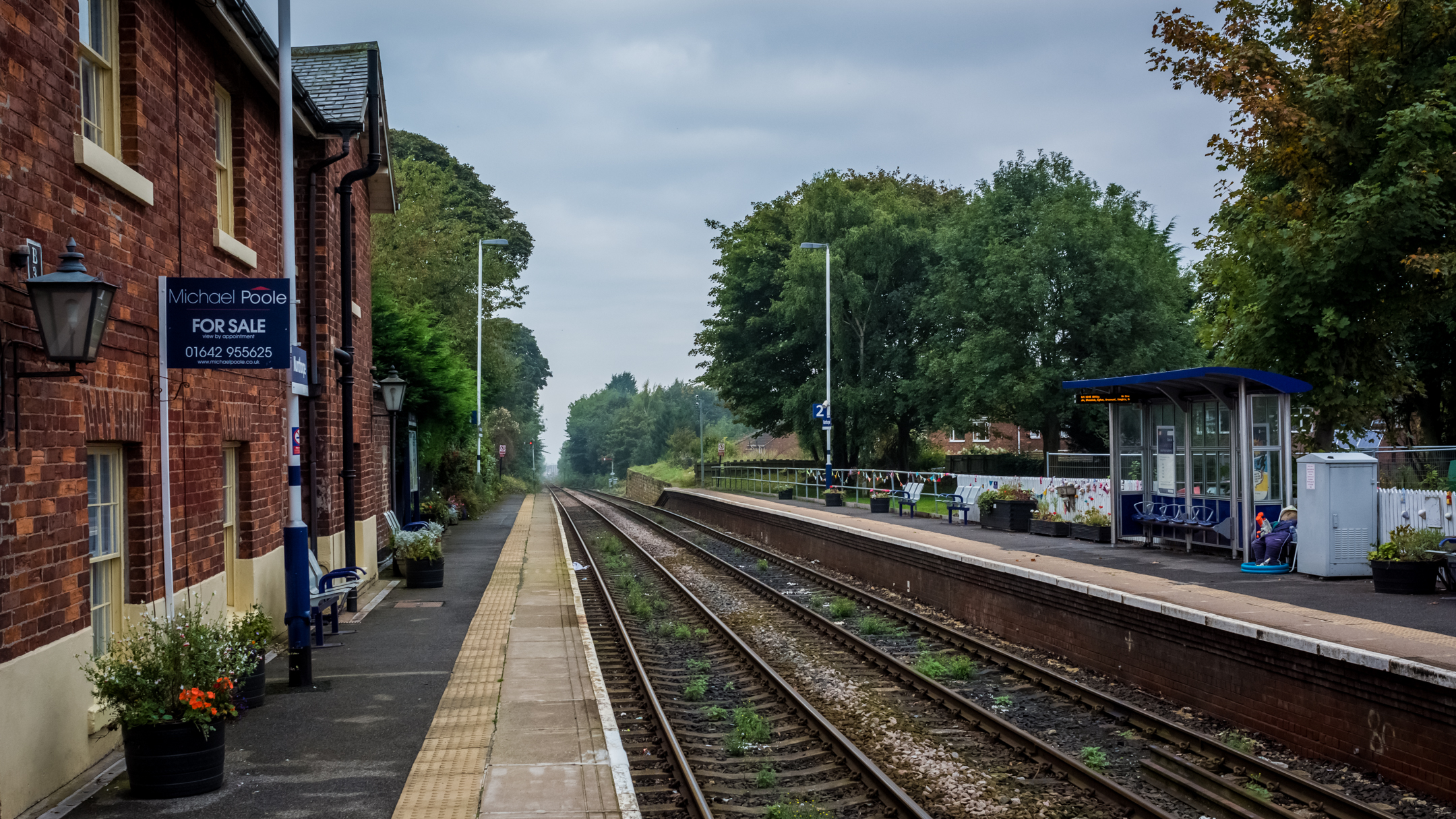

General information
- Location: Nunthorpe, Borough of Middlesbrough, England
- Coordinates: 54°31′41″N 1°10′11″W
- Grid reference: NZ538150
- Owner: Network Rail
- Manager: Northern Trains
- Platforms: 2
- Tracks: 2

Other information
- Station code: NNT
- Classification: DfT category F2

History
- Original company: Middlesbrough and Guisborough Railway
- Pre-grouping: North Eastern Railway
- Post-grouping: London and North Eastern Railway, British Rail (North Eastern Region)

Key dates
- 25 February 1854: Opened

Passengers
- 2021/22: ▲35,758
- 2022/23: ▲42,306
- 2023/24: ▲54,080
- 2024/25: ▲59,464
- 2025/26: ▲61,270
Location
- Location within North Yorkshire
Notes
- Passenger statistics from the Office of Rail and Road

Nunthorpe is a railway station on the Esk Valley Line, which runs between Middlesbrough and Whitby. The station serves the village of Nunthorpe, in North Yorkshire, England; it lies 4 miles 48 chains (7.4 km) south-east of Middlesbrough. It is owned by Network Rail and managed by Northern Trains.

One of the two passing loops on the line is located here, and there is a level crossing at the eastern end. The signal box that operates it also supervises the movements of trains on the entire branch and remotely controls the junction further down the line at Battersby. Renewal work in February 2026 has seen new sliding crossing gates installed here, as well as LED colour light signals to replace the old semaphores.

== History ==
Nunthorpe was originally on the Middlesbrough and Guisborough Railway line, opening in 1854. In 1964, the line between Nunthorpe and Guisborough was closed, meaning Nunthorpe was no longer a junction and only a station on the line to Whitby via Battersby. The December 2007 timetable brought about significant changes; the service is now better than it has been since the mid-1980s, when there was an hourly Nunthorpe – Middlesbrough service including seven Whitby trains.

=== Tees Valley Metro ===
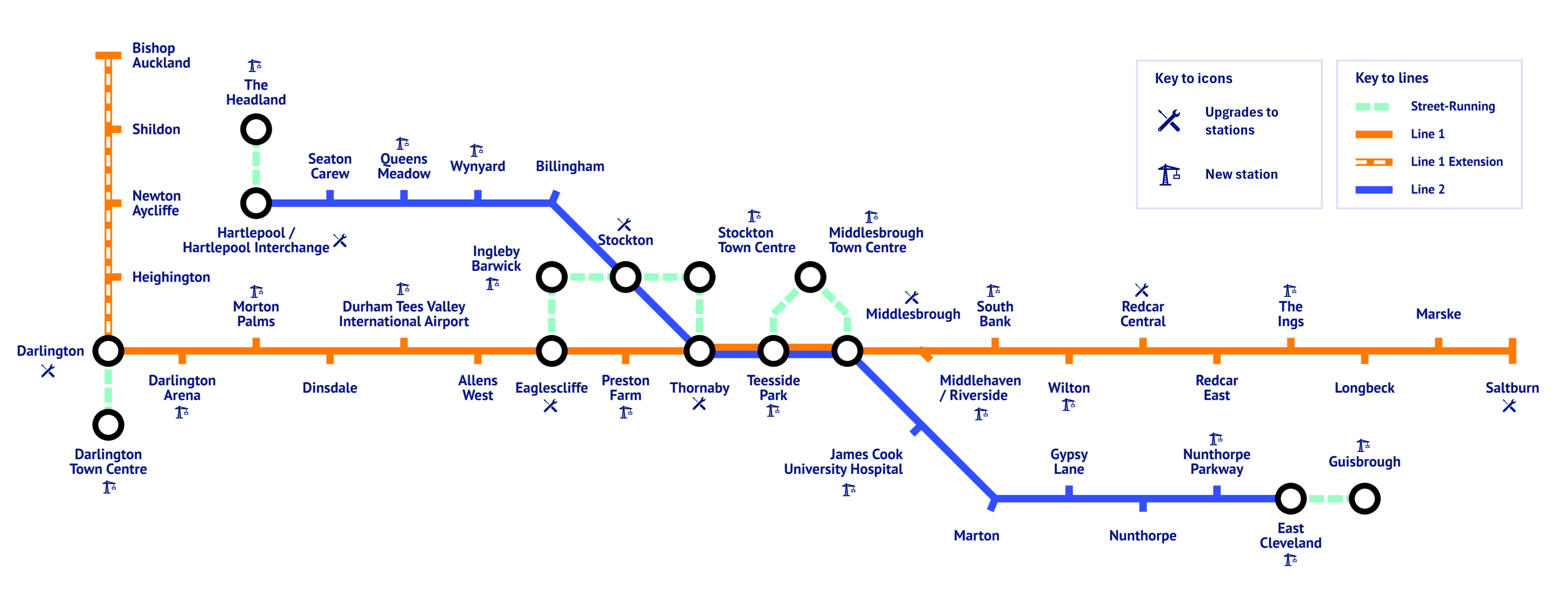
A transit diagram showcasing all discussed or mentioned ideas for the Tees Valley Metro

Starting in 2006, Nunthorpe was mentioned within the Tees Valley Metro scheme. This was a plan to upgrade the Tees Valley Line, and sections of the Esk Valley and Durham Coast Lines, to provide a faster and more frequent service across the North East of England. In the initial phases, the services would have been heavy rail mostly along existing alignments with new additional infrastructure and rollingstock. The later phase would have introduced tram-trains to allow street running and further heavy rail extensions.

As part of the scheme, Nunthorpe station would have received improved service to Hartlepool, possibly a street-running link to Guisborough and the Headland, with new rolling stock.

However, due to a change in government in 2010 and the 2008 financial crisis, the project was ultimately shelved. Several stations eventually got their improvements and there is a possibility of improved rolling stock and services in the future which may affect Nunthorpe.

== Facilities ==
The station is unstaffed. The main buildings still stand, but are now used as private residential accommodation. A waiting shelter is located on platform 2 (used by trains to Whitby and those that terminate here and return to Newcastle), whilst platform 1 has a canopied waiting area adjoining the main building, where there is an automated ticket machine. Digital CIS displays, timetable posters and a public telephone are provided to offer train running information. Step-free access is available to both platforms via the level crossing.

== Services ==
As of the December 2025 timetable change, Northern Trains operates the following general pattern:

- On Mondays to Saturdays:
  - 8tpd towards Whitby, with 2tpd terminating at Great Ayton and 6tpd continuing to Whitby
  - 1tph towards Middlesbrough, with most continuing to Newcastle via Hartlepool and 5 tpd terminating at Middlesbrough
- On Sundays:
  - 4tpd to Whitby
  - 1tph to Middlesbrough, with 2tpd continuing to Darlington.

Rolling stock used: Class 156 Super Sprinter and Class 158 Express Sprinter

Preceding station	National Rail	Following station
Gypsy Lane	Northern Trains; Esk Valley Line	Great Ayton
	Disused railways	
Ormesby	North Eastern Railway; Middlesbrough and Guisborough Railway	Pinchinthorpe
