= Whitby railway station =

Railway station in North Yorkshire, England

Whitby

General information
- Location: Whitby, North Yorkshire; England
- Coordinates: 54°29′05″N 0°36′55″W
- Grid reference: NZ898108
- Owner: Network Rail
- Manager: Northern Trains
- Platforms: 2
- Tracks: 2

Other information
- Station code: WTB
- Classification: DfT category F1

History
- Original company: Whitby and Pickering Railway
- Pre-grouping: North Eastern Railway
- Post-grouping: London and North Eastern Railway; British Rail (North Eastern Region)

Key dates
- 8 June 1835: Opened as Whitby
- 4 June 1847: Resited
- 1886: Renamed Whitby Town
- 1924: Renamed Whitby
- 30 September 1951: Renamed Whitby Town
- 5 September 1966: Renamed Whitby

Passengers
- 2020/21: ▼49,828
- 2021/22: ▲0.120 million
- 2022/23: ▲0.126 million
- 2023/24: ▲0.143 million
- 2024/25: ▲0.153 million

Listed Building – Grade II
- Feature: Original York and North Midland Railway station building
- Designated: 4 December 1972
- Reference no.: 1261393
Location
- Location within North Yorkshire
Notes
- Passenger statistics from the Office of Rail and Road

Whitby is a railway station serving the town of Whitby in North Yorkshire, England. It is the southern terminus of the Esk Valley Line from Middlesbrough. The station is owned by Network Rail; its mainline services are operated by Northern Trains and its heritage services by the North Yorkshire Moors Railway.

== History ==
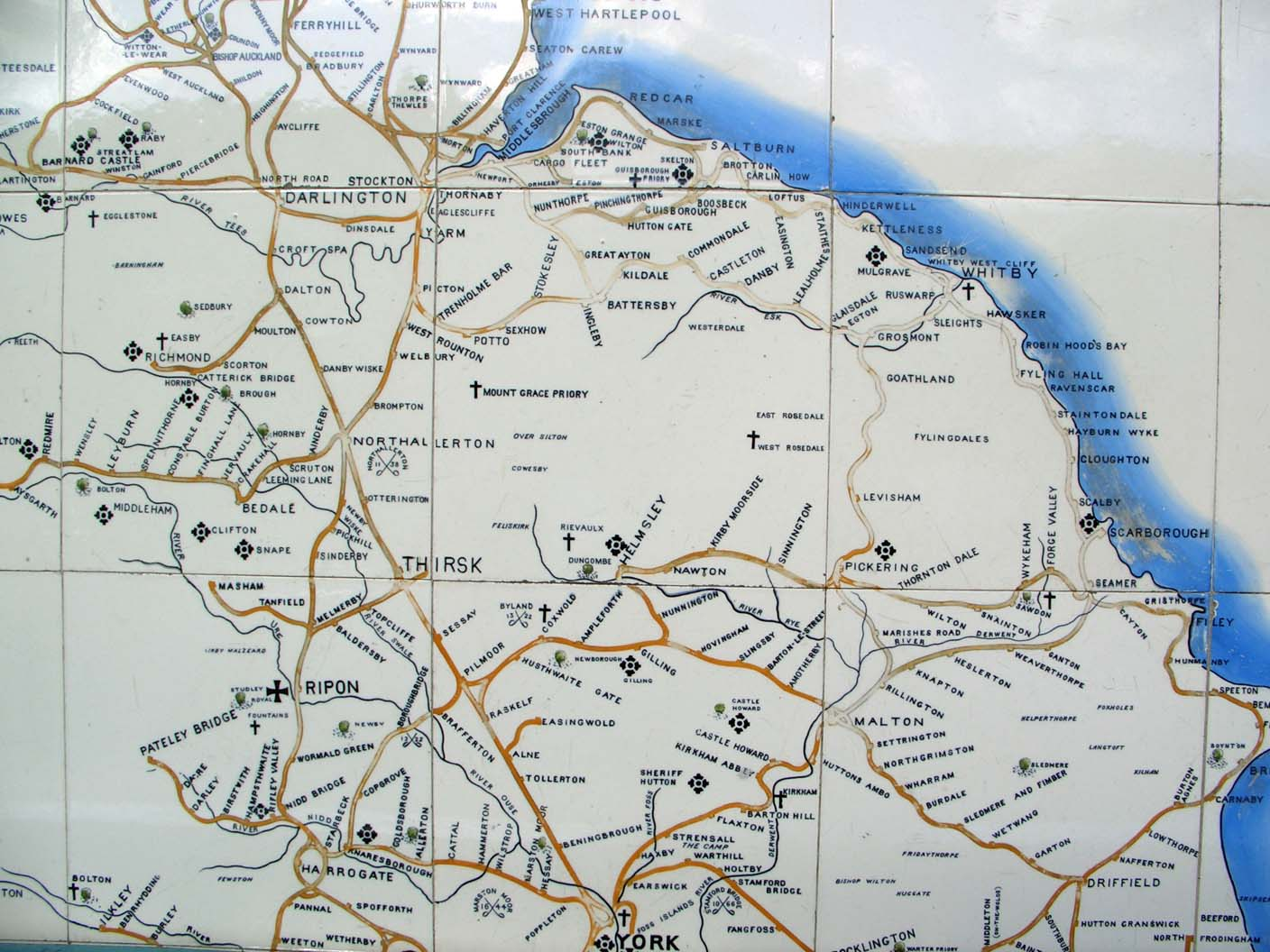
Tile map at the station, showing historic North Eastern Railway routes across North Yorkshire.

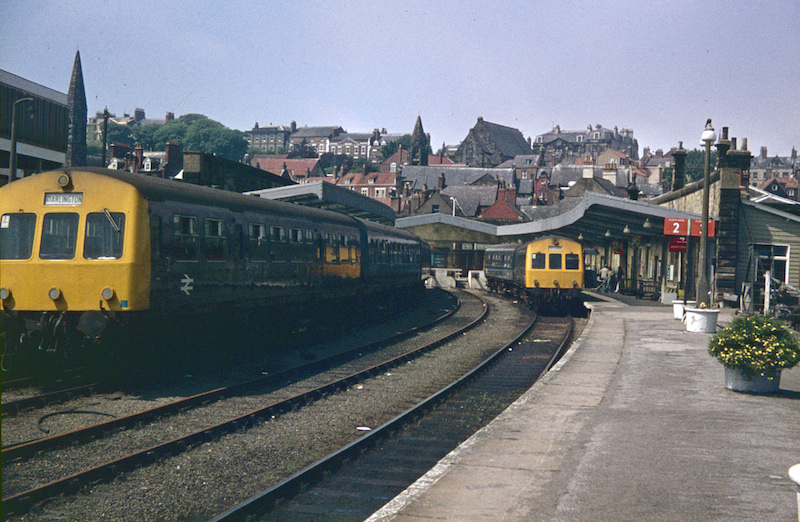
The station, photographed in the 1970s, with all four platforms still in use.

Whitby's original railway station stood near to the end of the current platform, in the form of the offices, workshop and carriage shed of the Whitby and Pickering Railway; a single track horse worked line opened throughout in 1836. Its engineer was George Stephenson.

In 1845, the W&P was taken over by the York and North Midland Railway and converted into a double tracked, steam worked line. The Y&NM built the present Whitby station to the design of its architect George Townsend Andrews, who also designed the locomotive shed and the goods shed. Andrews' station included a fine 'Euston Truss' overall roof which was removed by British Railways in 1953 and replaced by the present awnings.

In 1854, the Y&NM helped form the North Eastern Railway, who later added two more platforms to help deal with traffic from the other branch lines that served Whitby; the Esk Valley Line finally opened throughout to a junction at Grosmont in 1865 while the coast line from Loftus opened in 1883 and from Scarborough in 1885. Block signalling replaced the time interval system in 1876 and brought Whitby an unusual three storey signal box to make it high enough to see over the adjacent goods shed.

In 1900, the NER authorised the installation of tile maps at 25 of their stations. Whitby is one of nine stations left to have their map still in situ and intact. The other eight are at Beverley, Hartlepool, Middlesbrough, Morpeth, Saltburn, Scarborough, Tynemouth and York.

The NER became part of the London and North Eastern Railway at the grouping of the railways in 1923 and the LNER became part of British Railways with the nationalisation of the railways in 1948. The only changes brought to Whitby were in locomotives, rolling stock and signalling; the basic structure remained unchanged.

The station was scheduled to be closed in the 1963 Beeching Report, which recommended the removal of all three lines serving the station. The route to York via Pickering and Malton was closed as scheduled, while the coast lines had gone by 1965. However the Esk Valley Line to Middlesbrough was kept open because of poor road access for replacement buses.

With the closure of all but the Esk Valley Line, Whitby lost almost all of its staff. Over the following years the pickup goods train was withdrawn, the remaining double track as far as Grosmont was singled and the signal box closed and demolished, as was the goods shed. A run-round loop for excursion trains was retained and was used by the regular NYMR services from 2007 until 2014.

Platforms 3 and 4 were entirely removed and the site sold off, to be occupied by a supermarket. Platform 2 was cut back to what remains of the trainshed and its track removed, leaving only platform 1 rail served. Apart from the roofless and truncated station, Whitby's only other surviving railway buildings are the two track engine shed, originally built by the York and North Midland Railway and extended by the NER and the neglected remains of one of the pair of Whitby and Pickering Railway 1835 weighbridge houses.

In 2013, plans were approved for major development work around the station. This included the rebuilding and restoration of platform 2, to a somewhat longer length than the original. When the rebuilding of platform 2 was complete in 2014, the NYMR increased their service to four trains per day (five in peak periods) to and from Whitby. In December 2019, Northern increased their services from four trains per day to six. In May 2023, Northern removed an early morning service in order to increase capacity on a later morning service. This service was reinstated in December 2025.

== Facilities ==
The station has a privately-operated ticket office.

The platforms in 2026

== Services ==
=== Northern Trains ===
As of the December 2025 timetable change, the station is served by six trains per day on Mondays to Saturdays to Middlesbrough via Nunthorpe with one service continuing to Newcastle via Hartlepool. On Sundays, there are four services to Middlesbrough via Nunthorpe with two continuing to Darlington. All services are operated by Northern Trains.

Rolling stock used: Class 156 and Class 158 Sprinter Units.

=== North Yorkshire Moors Railway ===
The North Yorkshire Moors Railway operates heritage services between Pickering and Whitby via Grosmont. Services run daily from Easter until the end of October each year, with some additional services at other times of year.

Preceding station	National Rail	Following station
Ruswarp	Northern Trains; Esk Valley Line	Terminus
Preceding station	Heritage railways	Following station
Grosmont towards Pickering	North Yorkshire Moors Railway	Terminus
Disused railways
Whitby West Cliff	North Eastern Railway; Whitby, Redcar and Middlesbrough Union Railway	Terminus

== Historic structures ==
- Historic England. "Whitby Engine Sheds (1239954)". National Heritage List for England.

== Bibliography ==
- Marshall, Geoff; Pipe, Vicki (2018). The Railway Adventures: Places, Trains, People and Stations. September Publishing. ISBN 978-1910463871.
- Williams, Michael Aufrère (2019). The Whitby-Loftus Line. The Oakwood Press. ISBN 978-0-85361-542-2. Locomotion Papers 244.

This station offers access to the Cleveland Way
Distance to path	
Next station anticlockwise	Saltburn 19 miles
Next station clockwise	Scarborough 21 miles
