= Eppleby =

Village and civil parish in North Yorkshire, England

Coordinates: 54.51355°N 1.72668°W

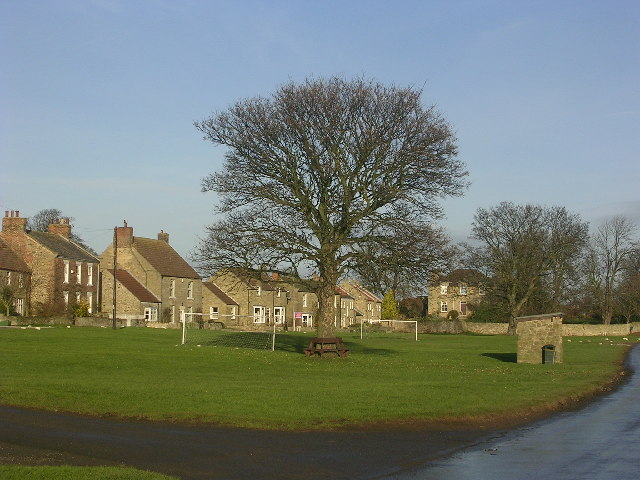
- Eppleby village green

- Location within North Yorkshire
- Population: 269 (2011 census)
- OS grid reference: NZ177131
- Unitary authority: North Yorkshire
- Ceremonial county: North Yorkshire
- Region: Yorkshire and the Humber
- Country: England
- Sovereign state: United Kingdom
- Post town: RICHMOND
- Postcode district: DL11
- Police: North Yorkshire
- Fire: North Yorkshire
- Ambulance: Yorkshire
- UK Parliament: Richmond and Northallerton

Eppleby is a village and civil parish in the county of North Yorkshire, England. It is located about 7 miles (11 km) north of Richmond. According to the 2011 United Kingdom census, the population of the parish was 269.

== History ==
The name Eppleby derives from the Old Norse eplibȳ meaning 'settlement where apples are grown'.

Eppleby was mentioned in the Domesday Book in 1086 as being in the hundred of "Land of Count Alan" and the county of Yorkshire, the population was estimated at 0.9 households.

In 1870–72 John Marius Wilson's Imperial Gazetteer of England and Wales described Eppleby as:

"a township in Forcett parish, N. R. Yorkshire; on the N border of the county, 2½ miles N by E of Gainford r. station, and 9 N of Richmond. Acres, 1, 060. Real property, £1, 964. Pop., 245. Houses, 59. There is a Free Methodist chapel"

The Methodist chapel was also mentioned in The London Gazette, although little evidence of the building save for a group of houses named Chapel Row remains in the village. Evidence of the disused Forcett branch line of the Darlington and Barnard Castle Railway, which was opened in 1867 can be found in the Eppleby.

== Governance ==
The village lies within the Richmond and Northallerton parliamentary constituency, which is under the control of the Conservative Party. The current Member of Parliament, since the 2015 general election, is Rishi Sunak. From 1974 to 2023 it was part of the district of Richmondshire, it is now administered by the unitary North Yorkshire Council.

== Community and culture ==
Eppleby has one public house, The Cross Keys, as well as a village shop and tea room that was opened in 2013. The village hall is a multi-purpose venue that also houses a part-time post office. The village primary school, Trinity Academy Eppleby-Forcett, has been in federation with the Church of England school in Middleton Tyas since 2015, and in 2018 both schools joined with Richmond Church of England primary school and rebranded to form Trinity Academy, with all three sites sharing the one executive head teacher.

== See also ==
- Listed buildings in Eppleby
