= Stockton railway station (S&D) =

Disused railway station in Stockton-on-Tees, County Durham

Stockton
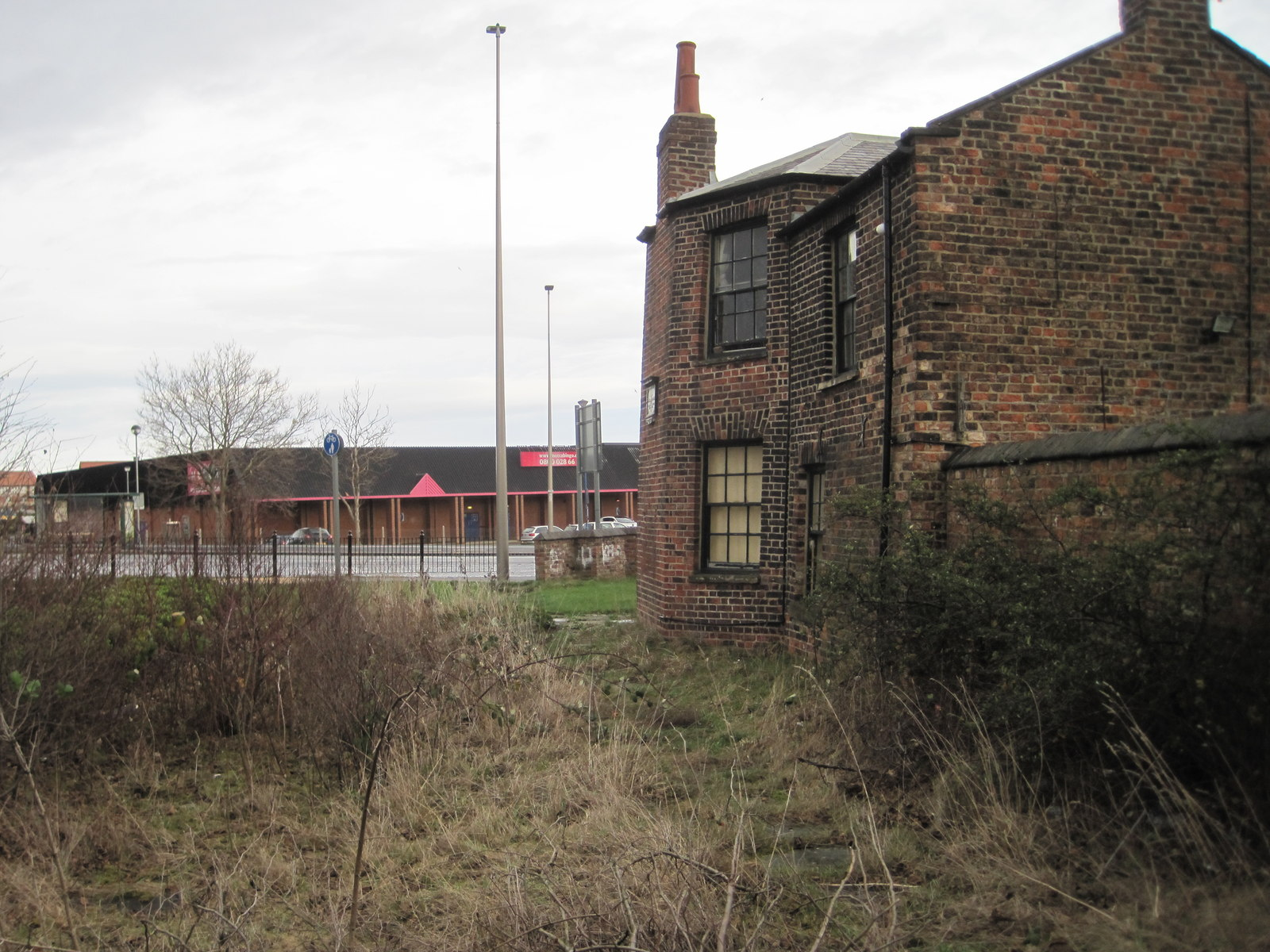
- The old station buildings

General information
- Location: Stockton-on-Tees, County Durham; England
- Coordinates: 54°33′31″N 1°18′38″W
- Grid reference: NZ446189

Other information
- Status: Disused

History
- Original company: Stockton and Darlington Railway
- Pre-grouping: Stockton and Darlington Railway

Key dates
- 27 September 1825: Opened
- 1 July 1848: Closed
Location

Stockton railway station served the town of Stockton-on-Tees, County Durham, England, from 1825 to 1848 on the Stockton and Darlington Railway.

== History ==
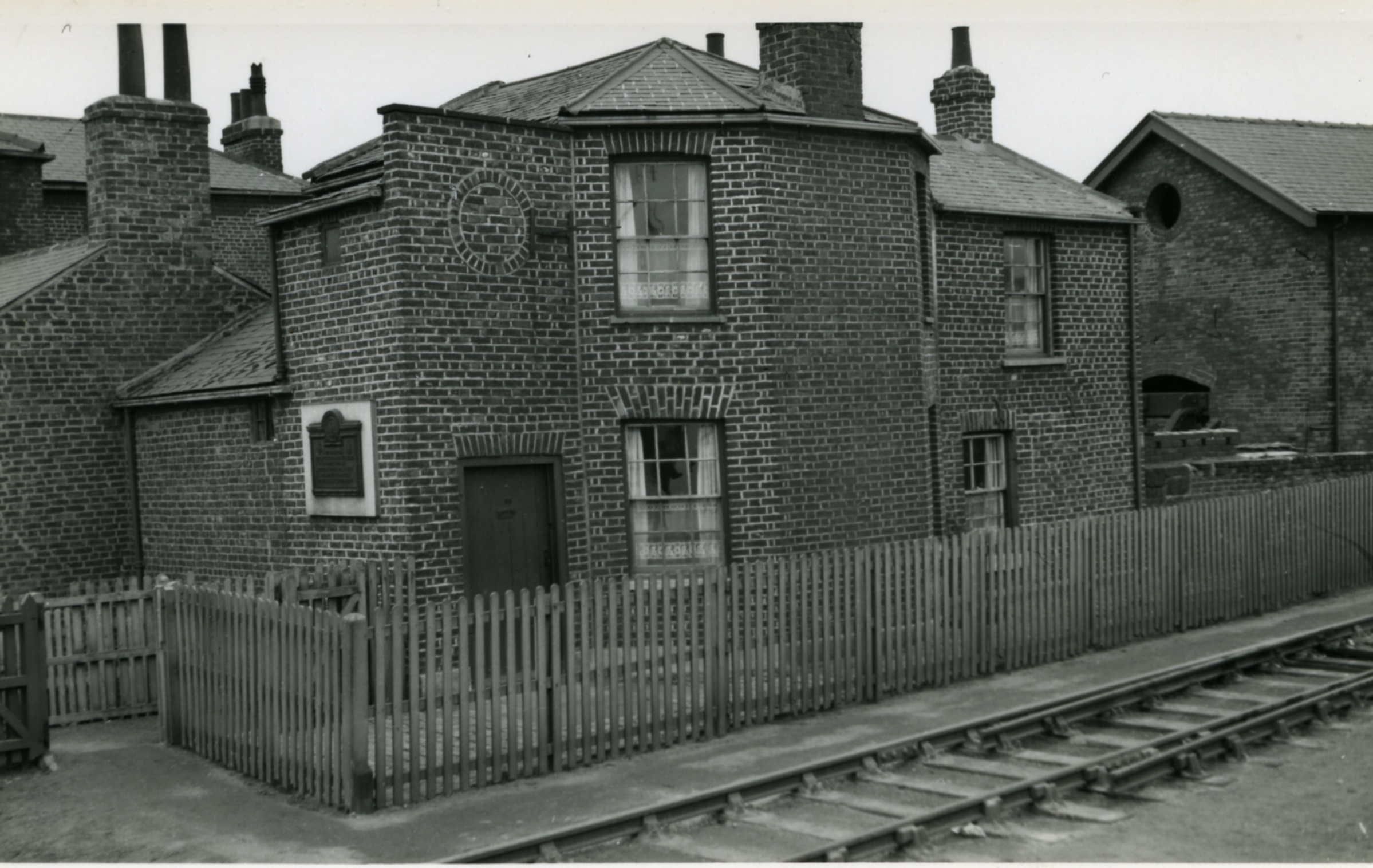
The station in 1954

The station was formally opened on 27 September 1825 by the Stockton and Darlington Railway, although regular passenger services started on 10 October. The services were initially horse drawn but steam services began on 7 September 1833. The station closed on 1 July 1848.

The former booking office was Grade II listed in 1951. It was briefly used as a museum during the 150th anniversary of the railway in 1975. Subsequently it became a hostel run by a charity for homeless people.

== See also ==
- Newport railway station (S&D)
- North Road railway station
- Head of Steam
- Shildon railway station
- National Railway Museum Shildon

Preceding station	Disused railways	Following station
Terminus	Stockton and Darlington Railway	Fighting Cocks; Line and station closed
