= Piercebridge railway station =

Disused railway station in County Durham, England

Piercebridge

General information
- Location: Borough of Darlington; England
- Coordinates: 54.5405°N 1.6728°W
- Grid reference: NZ212161
- Platforms: 2

Other information
- Status: Disused

History
- Original company: Darlington and Barnard Castle Railway
- Pre-grouping: North Eastern Railway
- Post-grouping: London North Eastern Railway

Key dates
- 8 July 1856: Station opened
- 30 November 1964: Station closed to passengers
- 5 April 1965: Closed completely
Location

Piercebridge railway station was a railway station serving the village of Piercebridge in County Durham, England. It was located on the Darlington and Barnard Castle Railway. The station opened in 1856 and closed completely as part of the Beeching cuts in 1965.

== History ==
The line between Darlington and Barnard Castle opened up to traffic in July 1856. Piercebridge station, like Barnard Castle, Winston and Gainford railway stations, opened up on the same day. The station was 2.5 miles (4 km) west of Darlington North Road station and 14 miles (23 km) east of the original Darlington and Barnard Castle Railway station at Barnard Castle. The station had two platforms and like many other country stations, received and despatched goods traffic from the station sidings. The station was actually located in a place called Carlbury, just to the north of Piercebridge, which led to the development of the hamlet of Carlbury.

The station was closed to passengers in November 1964, with full closure in April 1965. The line remained open for a while longer to serve the Forcett branch, which left the main line just west of Piercebridge station. The line was completely closed in 1966.

Preceding station	Disused railways	Following station
North Road; Line closed; station open	North Eastern Railway; Darlington and Barnard Castle Railway	Gainford; Line and station closed
