= Darlington and Barnard Castle Railway =

Former railway in North-East England

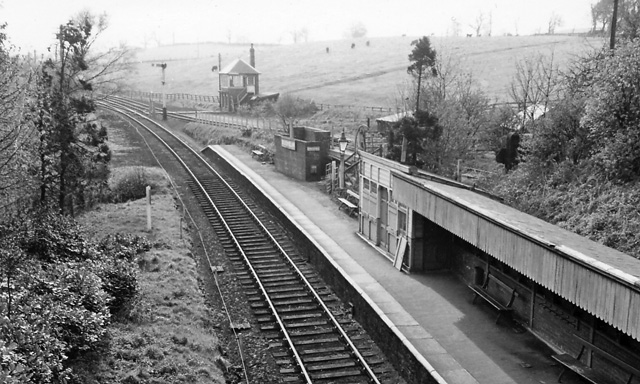
- Broomielaw station in April 1965

Overview
- Owner: Darlington and Barnard Castle Railway; Stockton & Darlington Railway; North Eastern Railway; London North Eastern Railway; British Railways
- Termini: Darlington; Barnard Castle
- Stations: 7 (including the two pre-existing stations in Darlington)

History
- Opened: 8 July 1856
- Line opened: 8 July 1856
- Line closed to passengers: 30 November 1965
- Line closed completely: 2 May 1966

Technical
- Line length: 17 mi (27 km)
- Track gauge: 4 ft 8 1/2 in (1,435 mm) standard gauge

The Darlington and Barnard Castle Railway, (also known as the D&BCR) was an east–west railway line that connected Darlington and Barnard Castle in County Durham, England. Besides the main running line, it had two branches that headed south into Yorkshire that were only used for freight. The whole system opened up by July 1856 and was closed completely by 1966. The former Merrybent freight branch is now used as part of the A1(M) road that bypasses to the west of Darlington.

== History ==
Darlington and Barnard Castle Railway Act 1854
- Act of Parliament
- Parliament of the United Kingdom
- Long title: An Act for making a Railway from the Stockton and Darlington Railway near Darlington to or near to Barnard Castle, both in the County of Durham, and for making Arrangements with the Stockton and Darlington Railway Company; and for other Purposes.
- Citation: 17 & 18 Vict. c. cxv

Dates
- Royal assent: 3 July 1854

Other legislation
- Repealed by: Stockton and Darlington Railway Amalgamation Act 1858

Status: Repealed

Text of statute as originally enacted

The line was authorised by the Darlington and Barnard Castle Railway Act 1854 (17 & 18 Vict. c. cxv) and opened up to traffic in July 1856. The act had been through Parliament in the 18th century with the route been designated as a canal with branches south into Yorkshire. The railway proposal had been through the process of approval once before and was rejected due to local landowner opposition. A further act of Parliament, the Stockton and Darlington Railway Amalgamation Act 1858 (21 & 22 Vict. c. cxvi), subsumed the company into the Stockton and Darlington Railway. The line became the eastern link between Darlington and Tebay as part of the 51-mile (82 km) South Durham and Lancashire Union Railway (SD&LUR), more commonly known as The Stainmore Line.

The line followed the valley of the River Tees west of Darlington and was engineered with easy gradients, although the 1-in-81 west facing uphill bank between Winston and Broomielaw was the steepest gradient on the 17-mile (27 km) section between the two towns. (Note: The distance between Darlington and Barnard Castle as measured by the railway was 16 3/4 miles (27 km), but from the junction at Hopetown at Darlington North Road to Barnard Castle only involved laying 15 miles (24 km) of new track.) During the construction period, heavy rains in October 1855 swept away two bridges being built over the River Tees by the contractors. The line was engineered by Thomas Bouch for £120,000.

The line was originally single track from the junction at Hopetown, west of North Road station, and was worked in one section by staff and ticket to Barnard Castle. After the Forcett Branch opened in 1867 (see below) the section from Hopetown to Piercebridge was doubled (the contract being let in May 1869). The line from Piercebridge to Forcett Junction was doubled the following year. Thereafter it was single to Barnard Castle; the section from Broomielaw to Barnard Castle was doubled in 1896, and at the same time a passing place was constructed at Winston. Piercebridge and Winston stations had two platforms, whereas Gainford and Broomielaw only had one platform each. The original station at Barnard Castle was closer to the town, but because of the distance between the original station and the one further north on the SD&LUR line, all passenger trains were concentrated on the second site which was a through site rather than the original terminus. The original station was then used as a goods facility, though, as it was no longer servicing passengers, the portico from the station entrance was moved to Saltburn Valley Gardens in 1867 as part of a memorial to Prince Albert. The line was single through Broomielaw with a junction to provide double track at the western end of the station area. The station at Broomielaw was a private halt for the owners of the nearby Streatlam Castle. The station was declared public in 1936 but did not appear in the LNER Timetable until June 1942.

The three original intermediate stations of Piercebridge, Winston and Gainford all had a single-storey station cottage designed by William Bryson who worked under Thomas Bouch. Between 1867 and 1874, all of these cottages were extended to have an upper floor.

At the eastern end of the line, the track diverged at Stooperdale Junction which was originally opened in 1859 as "Staff Junction" to allow trains from Bishop Auckland to access the line to Barnard Castle. When the SD&LUR line opened in 1863, this practice ceased as the SD&LUR provided a more direct route. Latterly, the line was used to afford trains access to either the original Stockton and Darlington line north to Heighington or east to North Road and Bank Top stations in Darlington. The triangle at Stooperdale was used to turn locomotives that were arriving or departing from the adjacent locomotive works.

A one-road engine shed was provided at Barnard Castle in 1865. This was extended in 1875 into two roads and by the time of the grouping in 1923, had an allocation of seven engines. The shed closed in 1937.

Traffic on the line increased during the Second World War with numerous training camps being built in the Barnard Castle area. Troops and tanks were offloaded at Barnard Castle and Broomielaw stations. The station crane in Barnard Castle goods station was destroyed after a tank was accidentally driven off one of the wagons in the yard and crushed the crane.

After the Stainmore Line had closed, the D&BCR was kept open for trains to the branch beyond Barnard Castle into Middleton-in-Teesdale which covered a distance of 25 miles (40 km). The whole line through Barnard Castle to Middleton-in-Teesdale closed to passengers in November 1964. The line between Forcett Junction and Barnard Castle was closed in April 1965, with the rest of the branch closing in May 1966.

== Stations ==
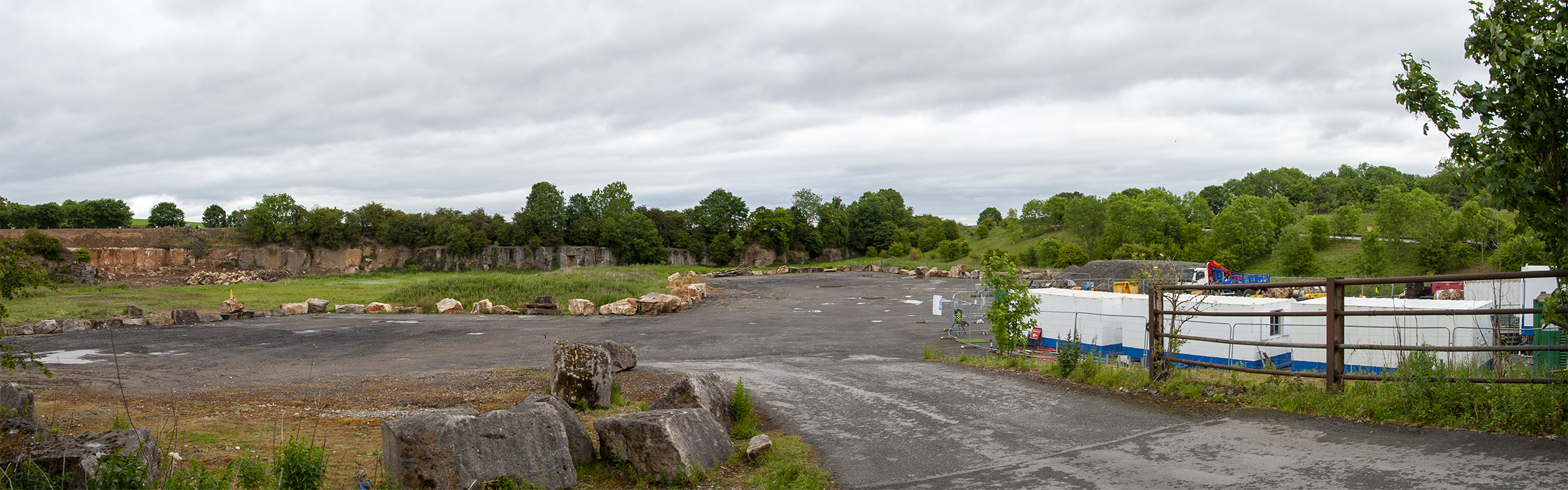
Barton Quarry in North Yorkshire, located at the end of the former Merrybent branch

- Darlington Bank Top
- Darlington North Road
- Piercebridge
- Gainford
- Winston
- Broomielaw
- Barnard Castle

== Forcett and Merrybent branches ==
Forcett Railway Act 1865
- Act of Parliament
- Parliament of the United Kingdom
- Long title: An Act to incorporate a Company for making a Railway from the Darlington and Barnard Castle Branch of the North-eastern Railway near Gainford in the County of Durham to Forcett in the North Riding of the County of York; to authorize Working and other Arrangements with the North-eastern Railway Company; and for other Purposes.
- Citation: 28 & 29 Vict. c. lxi

Dates
- Royal assent: 2 June 1865

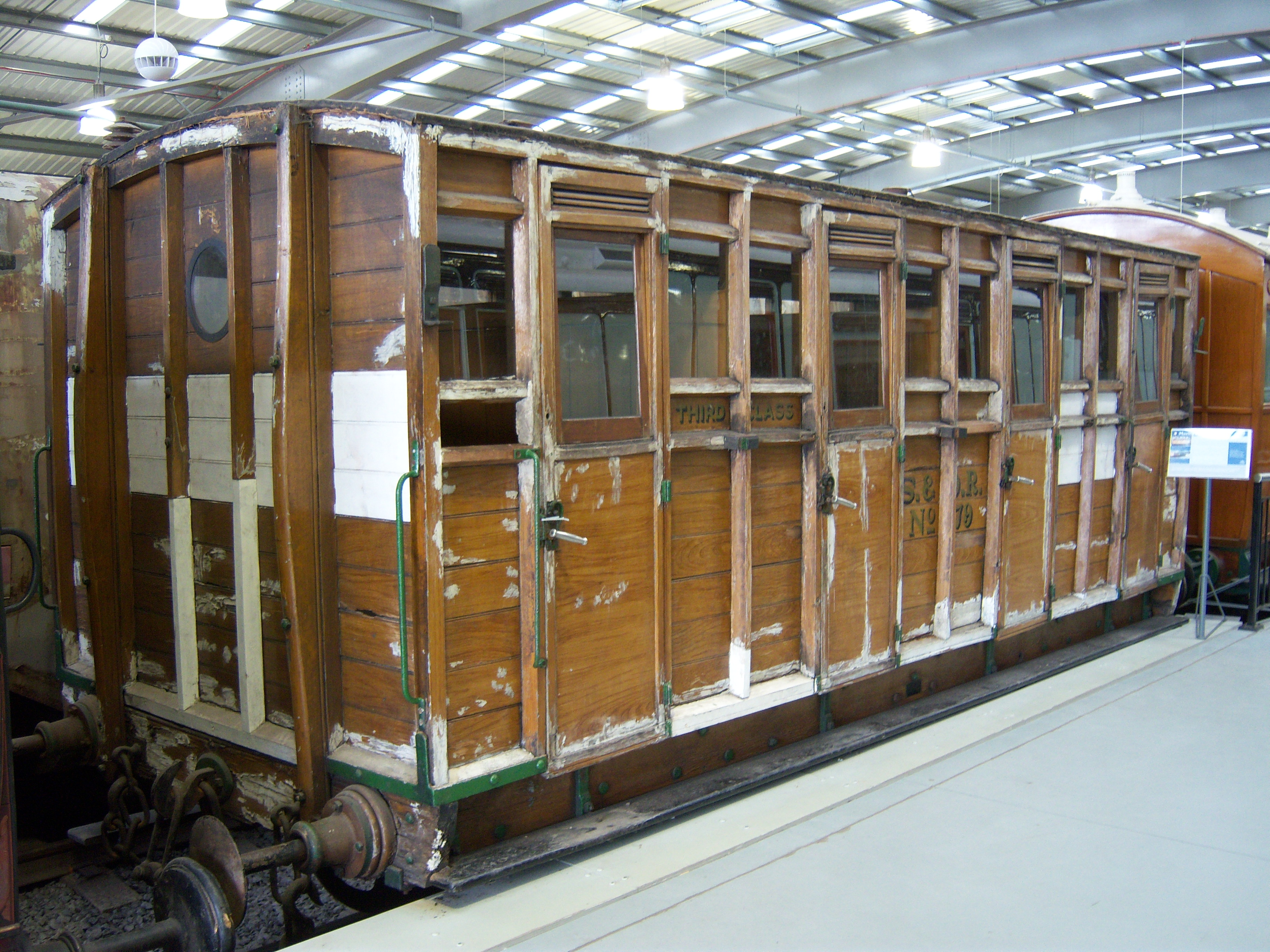
Stockton & Darlington Railway third class carriage No 179, used by the Forcett Limestone Company

The Forcett Railway was authorised by the Forcett Railway Act 1865 (28 & 29 Vict. c. lxi) to serve the limestone quarries in the area and was 8 miles (13 km) from the junction 1 1/2 miles (2.4 km) west of Piercebridge on the D&BCR. The branch did not open until February 1867, and even then was delayed in forwarding traffic as the track had not been ballasted properly or been engineered correctly. The line was worked by the NER but retained its independence until the grouping of 1923, when it became an LNER asset.

The Merrybent and Darlington Railway, also known as the Merrybent Railway, was authorised by the Merrybent and Darlington Railway Act 1866 (29 & 30 Vict. c. lxxv). The 6-mile (10 km) branch was built to convey copper, lead and limestone for the Merrybent and Middleton Tyas Mining and Smelting Company. The branch line was authorised by an act of Parliament in 1866, opened in 1870 but it closed in 1878 due to financial difficulties. The NER purchased the line in 1890 (Note: The purchase through the Darlington District Bank wasn't ratified until July 1900.) and re-opened it soon afterwards. It continued to forward aggregate from the quarries around Barton until 1950 when it was closed for the final time. A station and platform were provided at Barton for the use of non-aggregate goods workings, and although intended for eventual use by passengers, the station at Barton never sold a ticket. The trackbed of the former railway was adapted into the northern carriageway of the A1(M) bypass around Darlington in 1965 with the defunct quarry at Barton being used as a motorway interchange.

== Accidents ==
On 24 October 1905, a train from Darlington bound for Tebay had just left Gainford station when it derailed and slid down an embankment. Injuries were only slight, so a recovery operation was launched immediately as a Royal Train was due on the line later on the same day. The cause of the accident was due to several factors; a track working gang had removed a rail from the running line after misreading the timetable and not expecting the train to be there. The drivers of both locomotives (two were necessary for the ascent over Stainmore Pass) did not see the signals at danger and the explosives, left on the line by the track working gang to warn of danger ahead, did not detonate.
