= Railway 200 =

UK railway anniversary event

- Official logo
- Date: 1 January – 31 December 2025 (with some residual events in 2026)
- Duration: One year
- Venue: UK nationwide, and overseas
- Theme: Railway heritage and culture
- Website: railway200.co.uk

Railway 200 was a year-long celebration held throughout 2025, marking 200 years since the opening of the Stockton and Darlington Railway and the world's first steam-hauled, fare-paying passenger journey; an event deemed "the birth of the modern railway".

From January to December, thousands of events commemorated the anniversary. These included the world's largest ever rail festival, a recreation of the original journey along the railway, and an exhibition train touring Britain (continuing until June 2026), telling the story of railways. They raised funds in support of five UK charities.

== Background ==
The Stockton and Darlington Railway (S&DR), the world's first public railway to use steam locomotives, was formally opened on 27 September 1825, with events including the world's first steam-hauled, fare-paying railway passenger journey. (Note: In 1808, Richard Trevithick' Catch Me Who Can had hauled members of the public around a circular track 100 feet (30 m) in diameter, in London, for a fee, but this was not a public railway in the sense understood today.) This has been described as "the birth of the modern railway".

Celebrations were also held for the 50th, 100th and 150th anniversaries of the opening of the S&DR.

== Organisers ==
National celebrations in the UK were led by Railway 200, an organisation consisting of a core team housed within Network Rail, with the involvement of rail businesses, heritage organisations, preserved railways, community groups and others. Events were grouped into four themes, "education and skills", "innovation, technology and environment", "heritage, culture and tourism", and "celebrating railway people". The majority were delivered by organisations in the rail industry or related sectors, such as tourism and heritage (including the National Railway Museum, which was also celebrating its own 50th anniversary), or by grass-roots organisations including community rail partnerships.

Railway 200 raised funds in support of five UK charities: Alzheimer's Research UK, Railway Children, Railway Mission, the Railway Benefit Fund and the Transport Benevolent Fund.

== Events ==
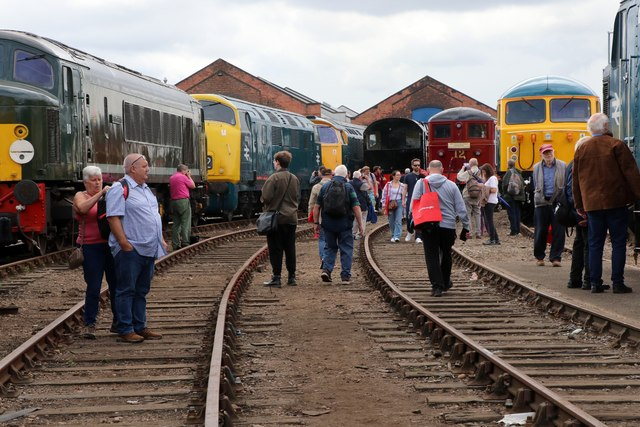
Visitors and exhibits at the Greatest Gathering, part of Railway 200, at Derby in August 2025

Celebrations began on 1 January 2025, when locomotives across the UK and overseas sounded their whistles and horns to signal the start of the bicentenary.

=== United Kingdom ===
Thousands of events and activities took place across the UK. They ranged from small-scale local celebrations, like floral displays and murals at railway stations, to large-scale events, including:

- An LNER Azuma, 801 207, named Darlington
- A commemorative poem, "The Longest Train In The World", by the Poet Laureate, Simon Armitage
- A commemorative £2 coin struck by the Royal Mint (depicting Locomotion 1)
- Two sets of commemorative stamps issued by Royal Mail (one depicting Locomotion No. 1 in 1825, 1890, 1925 and 1975 and the other with Locomotion No. 1, Rocket, City Of Truro, Mallard, Duchess of Hamilton and Evening Star)
- A national vote to choose the best-loved UK railway artwork. The winner was Train Landscape by Eric Ravilious; six of the top 20 were by Terence Cuneo.
- A world record-breaking run for a battery-powered train on a single charge. The GWR train, a Class 230 unit, travelled more than 200 miles
- Railway depot open days, including the first public opening of Hitachi Rail's factory at Newton Aycliffe
- A commemorative collection of models by Hornby, including LNER Azuma Darlington
- The reopening of the National Railway Museum's Station Hall by Anne, Princess Royal, after a £10.5 million restoration
- Listed building status for seven significant railway sites, including the S&DR's Cleveland Bay
- A blue plaque at the former home of the Reverend Wilbert Awdry, author of the Thomas the Tank Engine series
- Two million rail tickets offered at half-price
- A Great Rail Tales podcast series, which captured stories of people involved in the railway
- A time capsule of railway-themed memories, sealed in Derby in December 2025, to be opened for the 250th anniversary in 2075.

An estimated 1.4 million people attended Railway 200 related events throughout the 18 months from the start of 2025 to the end of the Inspiration Train in June 2026.

==== Inspiration exhibition train ====
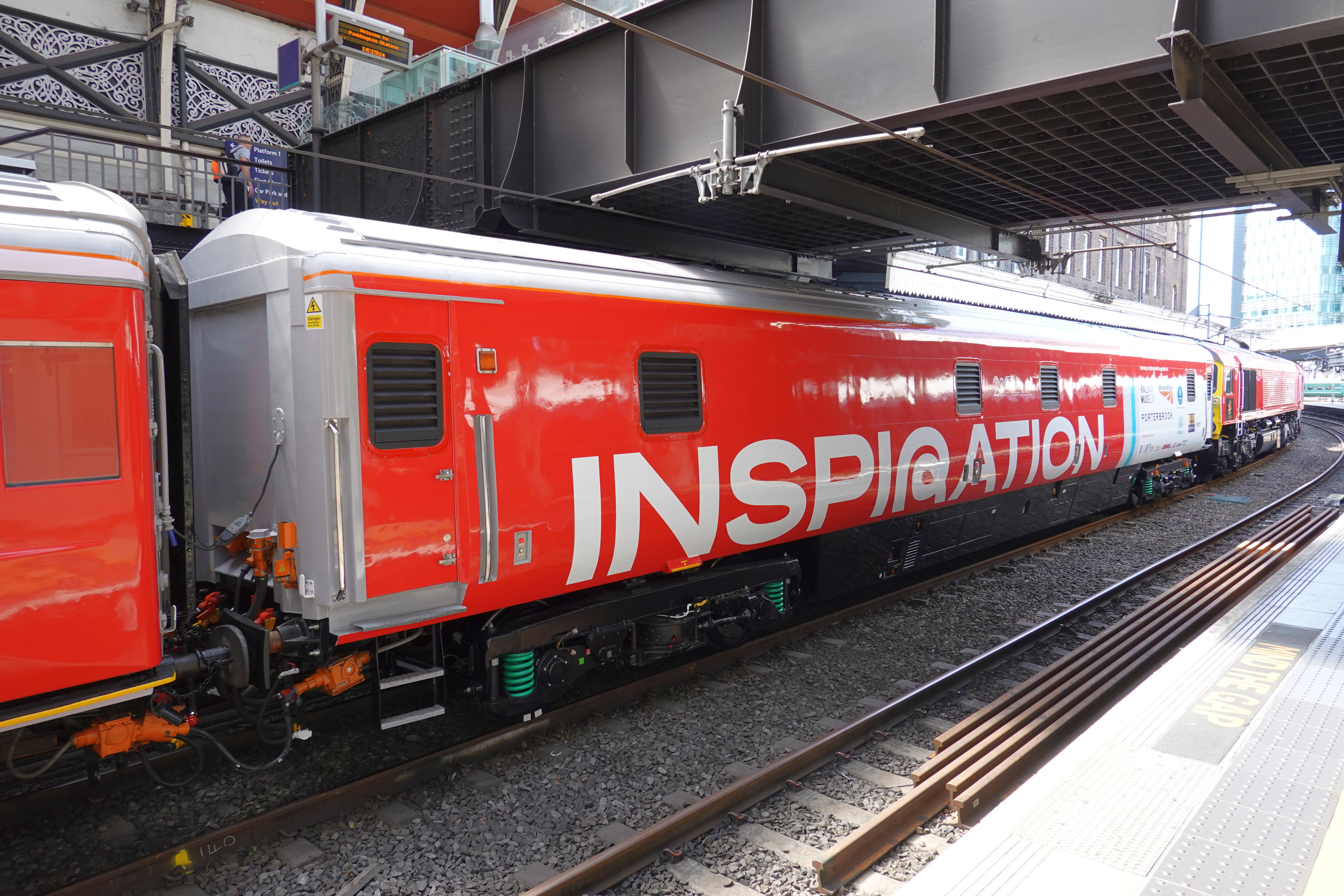
Inspiration, the Railway 200 exhibition train, at Paddington Station on 26 June 2025

Railway 200's exhibition train Inspiration began its tour of Britain on 26 June 2025. The four-carriage train, made up of converted Mark 3 coaches, uses artefacts and interactive exhibits to explain the past, present and future of railways.

It was launched at Paddington station and is scheduled to make 60 stops on a year-long tour of Britain, ending in Scarborough on 22 June 2026. By the end of 2025, it had been visited by 50,000 people as far north as the Cairngorms and as far south as Southampton.

In total, the train had over 100,000 visitors across the 250 days it was open at its 65 stops around mainland Britain. There were 273 tours for 6,000 students from 188 schools, including 35 special educational needs and disability (SEND) schools. The train racked up 12,000 miles (19,000 km) on the rail network and used 44,000 L (9,700 imp gal; 12,000 US gal) of recycled vegetable oil to power the generator coach, Inspiration.

In June 2026, it was announced that one of the carriages, Present (the Wonder Lab carriage), would be moving to Locomotion, Shildon. Another carriage, Together (the careers carriage), would be retained by Network Rail and housed at the Melton Test Track facility in the innovation hub.

In September 2026, the generator carriage, Inspiration, was stripped of its decorative vinyls and given a new role by providing power to Mark 5a coaches stabled at Stourbridge Junction for cleaning. This reduces the need for a Class 68 locomotive idling and thus reducing noise in the area.

==== Greatest Gathering (1–3 August) ====
The Greatest Gathering was an exhibition of railway vehicles hosted at Alstom's Derby Litchurch Lane Works during 1–3 August 2025. It was the world's largest-ever gathering of historic and modern rolling stock. 40,000 visitors viewed over 140 railway vehicles and locomotives.

==== Anniversary journey (26–28 September) ====
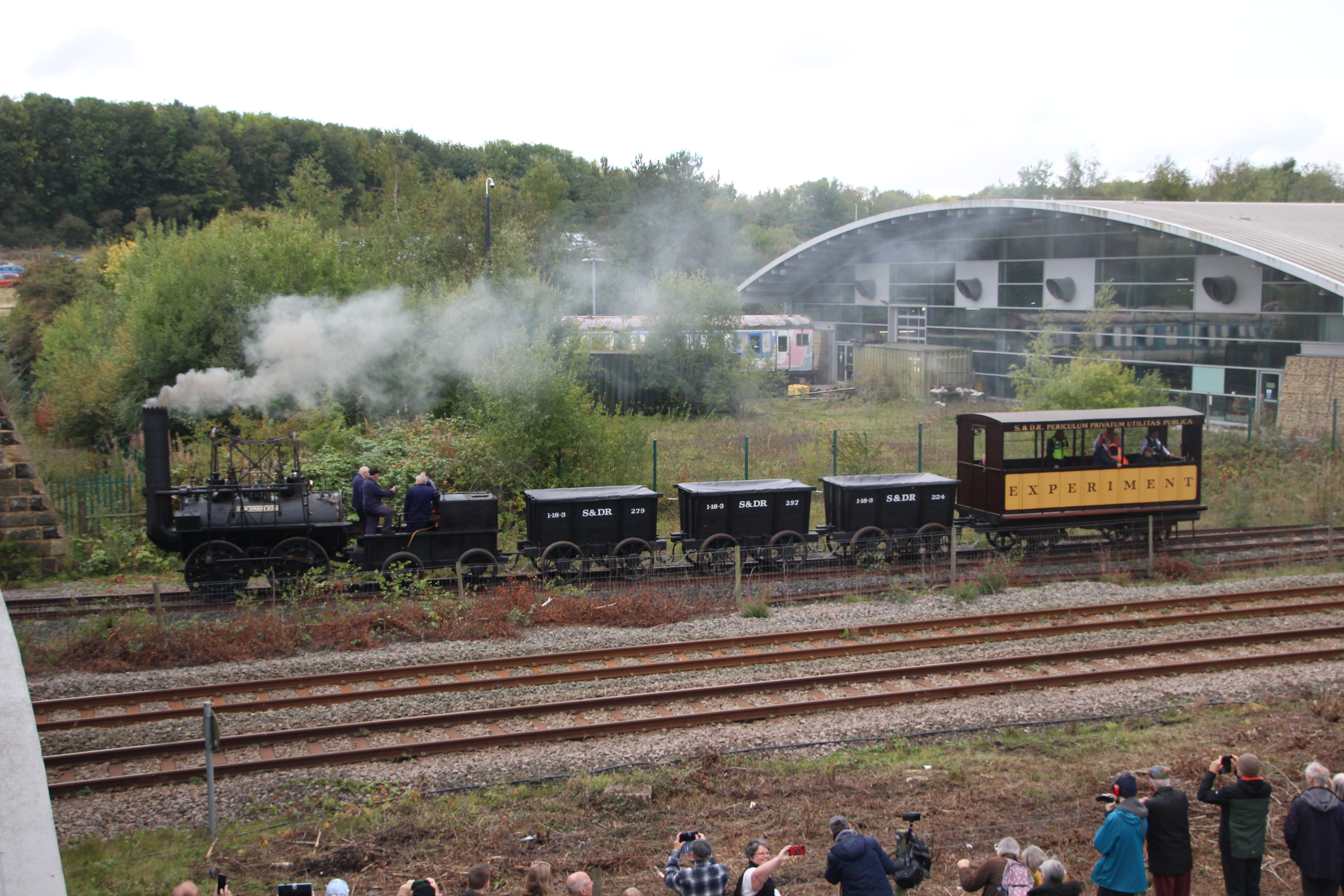
Locomotion No. 1 in the headshunt at Shildon ahead of The Anniversary Journey (26 September)

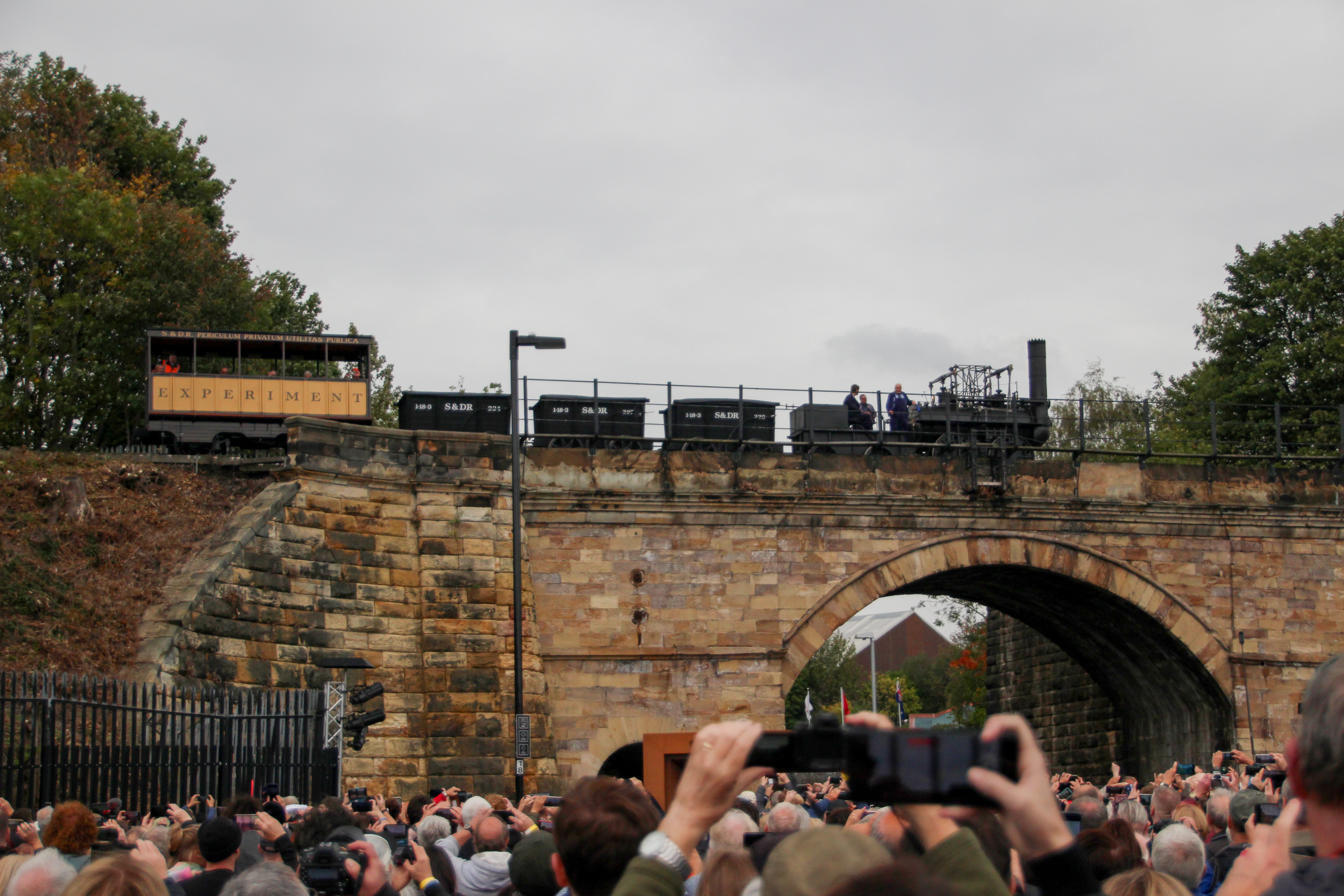
Locomotion No. 1 crossing Skerne Bridge as part of The Anniversary Journey (27 September)

The replica Locomotion No. 1 left the Locomotion Museum in Shildon at 12:05 on Friday 26 September and undertook a three-day journey to Stockton. It ended the first day its journey at Hopetown Darlington. Around 10,000–15,000 spectators gathered along the route between Shildon and Hopetown.

On the second day it crossed the Skerne Bridge with crowds watching from the car park. It also stopped on the illuminated bridge early that morning, before arriving at Darlington station next to LNER Azuma 'Darlington'.

Locomotion No. 1 then proceeded to Dinsdale Station ahead of the third day, which saw it making its way to Stockton Station and being welcomed by the sound of a brass band and dignitaries including the mayor. Upon arrival at Rochester Road, the 4th Regiment Royal Artillery gave it a gun salute, as it did for the original locomotive, and the locomotive was on display for 40 minutes before departing. 10,000 people are estimated to have attended.

Following the conclusion of the celebrations, the locomotive made its way to Ferryhill where it was put onto a low-loader and taken to Hitachi ahead of their open day on 4 October. The lines had to be closed for the runs since the train lacked the necessary equipment to interface with the network's signalling systems.

Each day's events were streamed live on S&DR200's YouTube channel, and on screens at Shildon, Darlington Market Square and Rochester Road. In total, more than 100,000 people are estimated to have visited the North East of England for celebrations over the three days, including Prince Edward, Duke of Edinburgh, who visited the replica Locomotion No. 1 at the start of its journey at Locomotion museum, and travelled in a carriage pulled by the replica along the train rides track from the coal drops to the main museum building.

==== Hitachi Newton Aycliffe Public Open Day (4 October) ====
On 4 October, Locomotion No. 1 appeared at Hitachi Newton Aycliffe as part of their first ever open day for the general public. Locomotion No. 1 carried visitors up and down the test track which runs parallel to the Bishop Auckland branch line just after Heighington Station. The event sold out in under 72 hours and had over 1,500 visitors.

=== Overseas ===
Events were held in more than a dozen countries, including Australia, Italy, the Netherlands, the Philippines, Sierra Leone, South Africa and the USA.

== In popular media ==
British broadcasters marked the anniversary with several TV documentaries, including Michael Portillo's 200 Years of the Railways on the BBC and Britain's Railway Empire in Colour on Channel 4.

BBC Radio 2 broadcast a railway-themed special called 21st Century Folk, which saw the lives of five people involved in the railway turned into songs by leading folk artists.

On 27 September 2025, BBC Radio 3 presenter Petroc Trelawny broadcast all day as he travelled from Scotland to London, talking about the railways and playing music related to railways.
