= Fighting Cocks railway station =

Former railway station in County Durham, England

Fighting Cocks
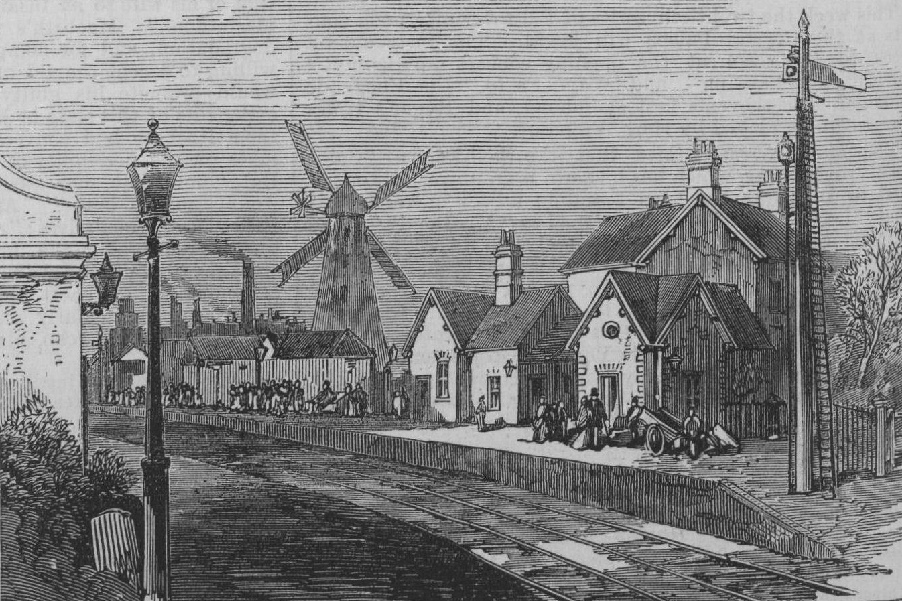
- An engraving of Fighting Cocks station, from "The Railway Jubilee at Darlington" in Illustrated London News: 340, 2 October 1875

General information
- Location: Middleton St George, Darlington; England
- Coordinates: 54.5218°N 1.4724°W
- Platforms: 2

Other information
- Status: Disused

History
- Original company: Stockton & Darlington Railway
- Pre-grouping: North Eastern Railway
- Post-grouping: London & North Eastern Railway; British Rail (North Eastern)

Key dates
- 10 October 1825: First regular passenger train over Stockton & Darlington Railway; first unofficial use of the station
- c. 1830: Official station opened as Middleton and Dinsdale
- 1866: Renamed Fighting Cocks
- 1 July 1887: Station closed to passengers
- 1964: Station closed completely
Location
- Location within England Location within the United Kingdom Location within Europe

Fighting Cocks railway station was a railway station on the original route of the Stockton & Darlington Railway (S&DR), which served the villages of Middleton St George and Low Dinsdale in County Durham, as well as the once popular Dinsdale Spa Hotel from 1829.

== History ==
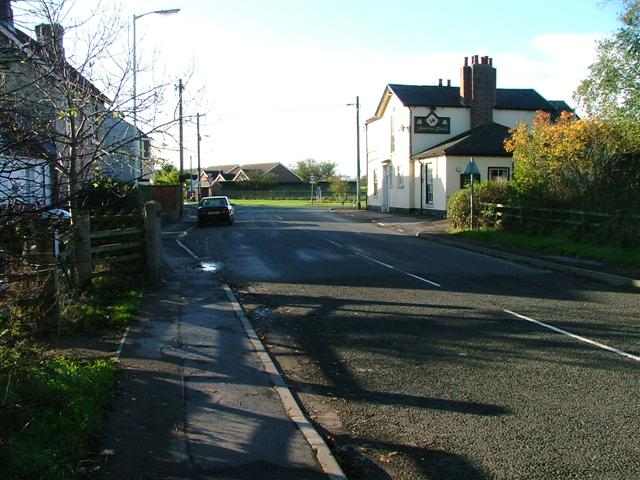
The Fighting Cocks public house in November 2005 seen from the site of the level crossing. The station was located immediately to the left of the road.

When the Stockton & Darlington Railway first opened on 10 October 1825, there were no official stations, as passenger trains were provided by independent coach operators who purchased a licence from the railway company to enable them to operate on the line. Tickets were sold by local publicans, and so it has been claimed that the Fighting Cocks public house, a coaching inn near where the railway crossed Rykeneild Street, could be one of the oldest surviving station booking office in the world. It was not until the success of passenger services on the Liverpool & Manchester Railway persuaded the S&DR to purchase the coach operators that in December 1833 it began to operate its own locomotive-hauled passenger service.

In 1829, the Dinsdale Spa Hotel was opened close to the village of Low Dinsdale, which led to an increase in travel to the village using the railway. As a result, a permanent station was opened during the 1830s (appearing in timetables by 1838), on the east side of the level crossing, to cater for this traffic. It was originally called Middleton and Dinsdale but was renamed Fighting Cocks in 1866.

In 1863 the S&DR was amalgamated into the North Eastern Railway (NER), who on 1 July 1887 opened a new line from south of Darlington Bank Top station to Oak Tree Junction, east of Fighting Cocks station, to enable passenger services on the former S&DR route to serve Bank Top station. However the opening of this new route meant that Fighting Cocks was bypassed, and so a new station was provided at Dinsdale to replace it. Over the course of its life as a passenger station, approximately 30,000 passenger tickets were sold to Fighting Cocks. From this point on Fighting Cocks was only served by goods trains until it was closed completely as an economy measure in 1964.

The line through the station remained as a through line until it was severed at the western end on 21 May 1967, though it was partially retained as a short branch line from Oak Tree Junction until the 1970s.

A public footpath now runs along the alignment of the railway through the site of the station.

| Preceding station | Historical railways | Following station |
|---|---|---|
| Stockton (Stockton & Darlington Railway); Line and station closed | North Eastern Railway; Stockton & Darlington Railway (Stockton Branch), (Middlesbrough Branch) & (Yarm Branch) | Darlington North Road; Line closed, station open |
| Thornaby; Line closed, station open | North Eastern Railway; Stockton & Darlington Railway (Stockton Branch), (Middlesbrough Branch) & (Yarm Branch) | Darlington North Road; Line closed, station open |
| Yarm Depots; Line and station closed | North Eastern Railway; Stockton & Darlington Railway (Stockton Branch), (Middlesbrough Branch) & (Yarm Branch) | Darlington North Road; Line closed, station open |
