= Listed buildings in Eppleby =

Eppleby is a civil parish in the county of North Yorkshire, England. It contains two listed buildings that are recorded in the National Heritage List for England. Both the listed buildings are designated at Grade II, the lowest of the three grades, which is applied to "buildings of national importance and special interest". The parish contains the village of Eppleby and the surrounding countryside, and the listed buildings consist of a house and a farmhouse.

== Buildings ==
Name and location	Photograph	Date	Notes
Rawling; 54.53338°N 1.70726°W		Late 17th to early 18th century	The house is in stone, with dressings in stone and brick, quoins, two storeys and an L-shaped plan. The south range is on a boulder plinth, and has three bays, and a pantile roof with moulded coping. The rear wing has a lean-to in the angle, and a stone slate roof with coping and a shaped kneeler on the right. Most of the windows in both parts are sashes.
Village Farmhouse; 54.51564°N 1.72572°W	—	Mid 18th century	The farmhouse is in sandstone on a plinth, with rusticated quoins, and a tile roof with stone coping and shape kneelers. There are two storeys, a main block of two bays, and a lower bay to the right. The doorway has a rusticated quoined surround and a large keystone, and the windows are sashes in architraves with keystones. In the right bay is a casement window in the ground floor and a sash above.
