= Yarm Depots railway station =

Former railway station in County Durham & North Yorkshire, England

Yarm Depots
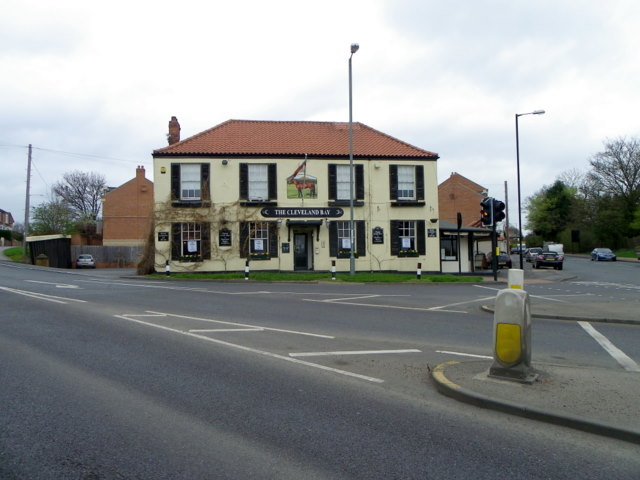
- The Cleveland Bay pub, behind it was the location of the S&DR Coal and Lime Depot near Yarm Depots station

General information
- Location: Egglescliffe, Borough of Stockton-on-Tees, County Durham; England
- Coordinates: 54.51507°N 1.35622°W
- Platforms: ?

Other information
- Status: Disused

History
- Original company: Stockton & Darlington Railway
- Pre-grouping: North Eastern Railway
- Post-grouping: London & North Eastern Railway; British Rail (North Eastern)

Key dates
- 17 October 1825: Branch line to Yarm opens
- 1830: Opened to passengers
- June 1862: Station closed to passengers
- 1872: Station and branch line closed
Location
- Location within England Location within the United Kingdom Location within Europe

Yarm Depots railway station was a railway station on a short branch line on the original route of the Stockton & Darlington Railway (S&DR), which served both the village of Egglescliffe in County Durham and the market town of Yarm (across the River Tees) in North Yorkshire, England.

== History ==
The station was originally the terminus of a branch line of the Stockton and Darlington Railway from the junction near Allens West (Yarm) station on the Bishop Line between Bishop Auckland and Saltburn-by-the-Sea via Shildon and Darlington in County Durham. The line ran through the village of Egglescliffe until it reached the station at Urlay Nook Road. It was used for the transporting of coal and limestone around the local area. It was opened by the Stockton and Darlington Railway in 1830 and began to see both mineral, freight and passenger traffic using the 1-mile (1.6 km) long branch line to Yarm Depots from 1830 until the closure to passengers in 1862 and only a decade later. The entire branch line was closed to all mineral and freight traffic in 1872. The line was lifted shortly after and the site of the station has since been occupied by South View and The Crescent housing estates.

== Present day ==
Since closure to all rail traffic, the trackbed has since been redeveloped with housing, road alignments and parks. Some parts of the line are still traceable on maps, especially near the Cleveland Bay pub and near Allens West station where the former junction for the Yarm branch began.

In September 2025, to coincide with the 200th anniversary of public railways in the United Kingdom, Historic England announced that the Cleveland Bay pub near the former station had become a Grade II listed building, as it is the world's oldest purpose-built railway pub.

| Preceding station | Historical railways | Following station |
|---|---|---|
| Fighting Cocks; Line and station closed | Stockton & Darlington Railway (Yarm Branch) | Terminus |
