= Darlington rail crash =

1928 train crash in Darlington, England

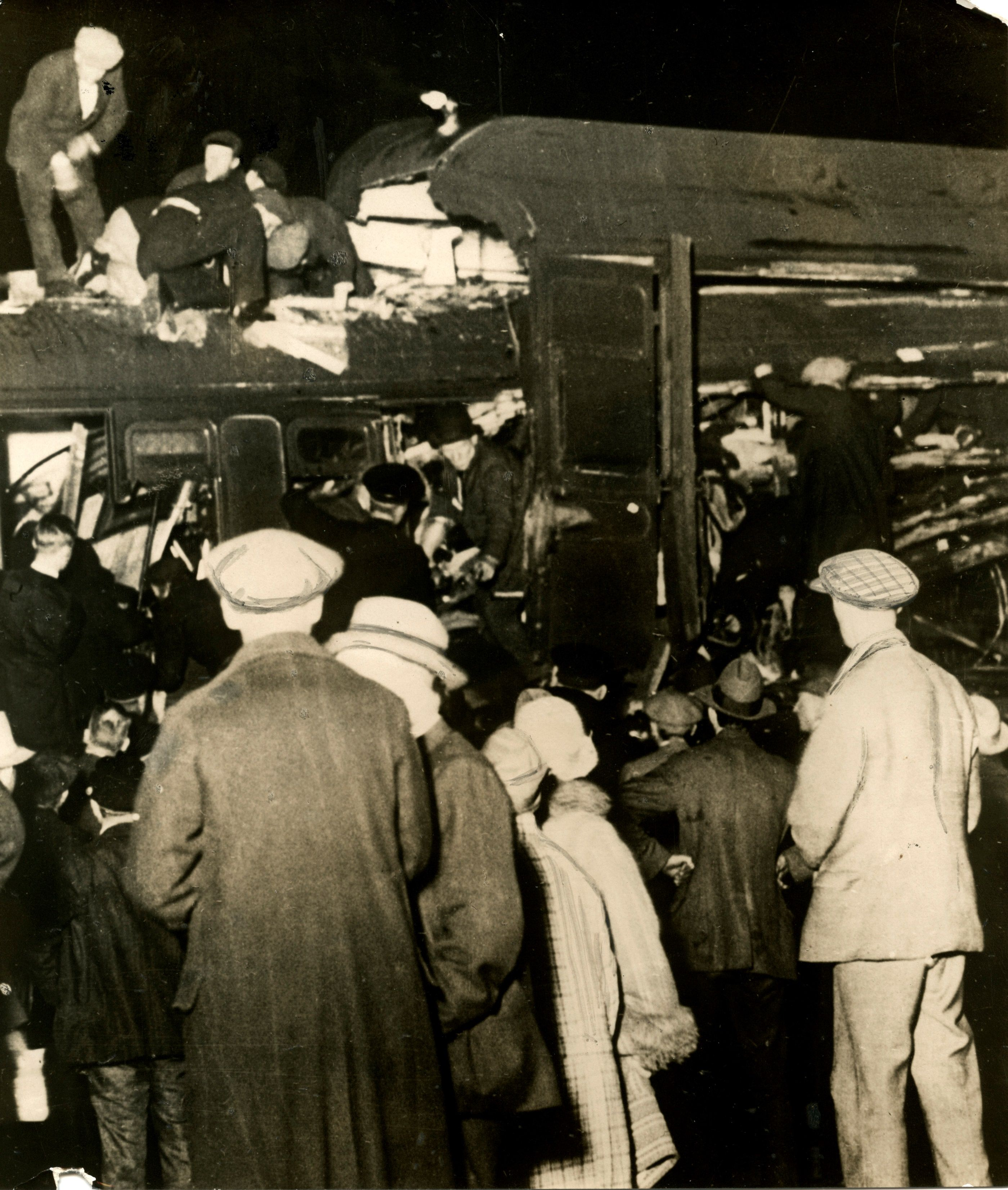

Details
- Date: 27 June 1928; Approx 11.00pm
- Location: Darlington Bank Top station
- Coordinates: 54.5178°N 1.54677°W
- Country: England
- Line: East Coast Main Line
- Operator: LNER
- Incident type: Collision
- Cause: Driver's error

Statistics
- Trains: 2
- Deaths: 25
- Injured: 45

The Darlington rail accident occurred on the evening of 27 June 1928 when a parcels train and an excursion train collided head on at Darlington Bank Top railway station in County Durham, England. The accident was caused by the parcels train driver passing a signal at danger, due to misunderstanding the signalling layout in an unfamiliar part of the station. This accident resulted in the deaths of 25 people and the serious injury of 45 people.

== Events leading up to the collision ==
On the night of 27 June 1928, LNER Raven Class B16 4-6-0 No. 2369, which formed part of the 9.30 pm up parcels train for York arrived at 10.45 pm – 11 minutes late. A short while after the station foreman instructed the signalman to allow the parcels train to move forward, beyond the scissors crossing at the south end of the platform. The engine moved forward to the south end of Platform 1 and waited. The shunter was then given instructions to take charge of the necessary shunting movements. During this time a train left No. 2 Bay line. The shunter passed instructions face-to-face with the driver whilst they waited for a fish train to pass. Once his signal was clear the shunter, riding on the last of the three carriage trucks, signalled the driver to start the movement. The train had to move far enough forward to clear No. 53 points. Once these points were clear the signalman reversed the points and signalled to the shunter to begin the propelling movement. These movements were completed at approximately 11.02 pm. Whilst here, the shunter coupled up the necessary vehicles and connected the brakes. At 11.04pm the signalman in the Platform East signal box offered the parcels train to the signalman in the South Junction Signal Box. The train was accepted "under caution". Up to this point all movements had been completed correctly and no errors had been made.

== Collision ==
As the engine moved forward the shunter saw that the signals were at "danger"; the shunter then applied the brake and noted that the brakes were working correctly as he noticed a reduction in speed. Within 10 yards (9 m) of the signal at "danger", the shunter believing the train was now stopping, released his brake. He then immediately checked the signals and seeing them at "danger" immediately re-applied the brake. At the inquest the shunter stated that the first brake application was not full due to his fear of the train dividing; the second brake application although applied to a greater extent was still not a full application. The parcels train now blocked the track upon which the excursion train was attached.

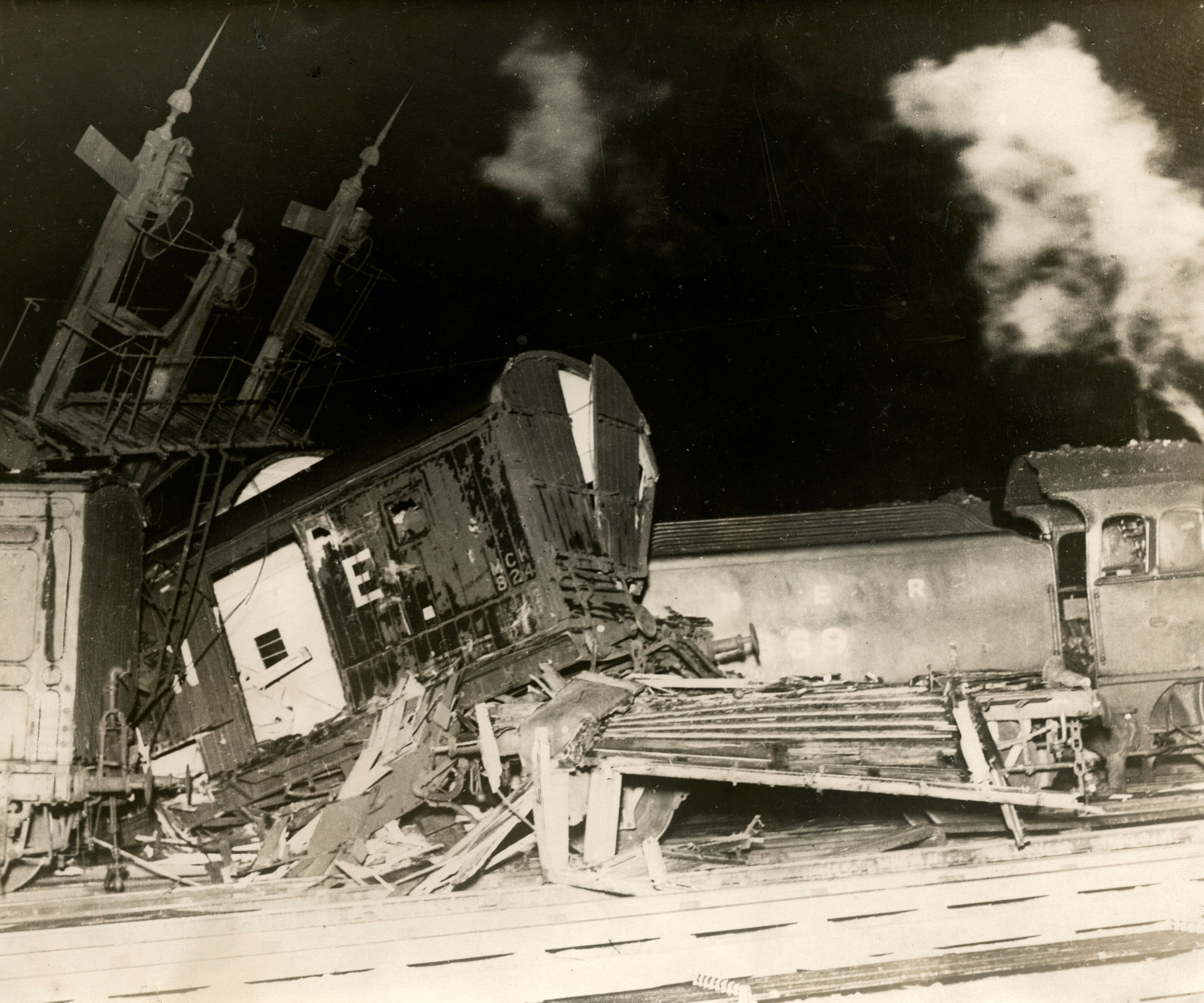
B16 No. 2639’s train after the collision.

The driver of the return excursion train from Scarborough to Newcastle approached the South Junction signal box at approximately 45 miles per hour (70 km/h), having observed the previous signals displaying "Clear". The driver stated the first he knew of an obstruction on the line was seeing the headlights of another engine emerging from the left onto the down through line. The driver of the excursion train stated he had less than two seconds to act during which time he made a continuous brake application.

== Effects ==
At the point of impact it is estimated that the excursion train was doing at least 45 mph (70 km/h) whilst the parcels train was probably stationary with its brakes released.

The parcels train

Having cleared No. 68 facing point the engine was forced backwards through No. 68 points and found on the rails of the Down Through Line. The first four vehicles behind the engine were derailed and thrown across the crossing. The last six vehicles were pushed down towards Platform No. 1.

The excursion train

The engine was derailed, overturned and thrown onto the No. 4 Platform Line and the Down Duplicate Line. The following surge resulted in the three front vehicles being significantly damaged, with the second and third carriages telescoping. This is where the majority of deaths occurred.

A tragic feature of the accident was that because the severe damage was localised, many of the deaths occurred among a group of women returning from a Mothers' Union outing from the colliery township of Hetton-le-Hole. "It was like a mining disaster with women rather than men as the victims; there were four widowers in a single street".

There was other damage to all vehicles involved in the collision. The first carriage of the excursion train was lit by gas; however, during the crash the pressured gas system remained intact, possibly reducing the number of casualties.

== After the collision ==
The report noted that within 20 minutes there were more than enough people and materials available to assist than could be used, and that "The arrangements made by the Company for dealing with the emergency and affording assistance to those injured appear to have been adequate in every direction".

Qualified medical assistance had arrived within 25 minutes, possibly via Greenbank Hospital and the Fire Brigade were also in attendance.

== Conclusions ==
The investigating officer from the Board of Trade was Colonel J.W. Pringle of the Royal Engineers. Pringle concluded that responsibility for this accident lay with Driver R.J. Bell, the driver of the parcels train, who passed signals at danger. His lack of knowledge regarding signalling and his lack of experience at Darlington Station Yard being the probable cause of the accident. The report did however praise his quick thinking in releasing the brake, this may have prevented further injury and damage. Driver McNulty of the excursion train could do nothing to prevent the collision and was fully exonerated, as were the Darlington signalmen.

The report also criticised:-

- Fireman J.J.McCormack – Pringle did not accept his statement that he knew nothing about signals or the authority they gave a driver, since he had passed his examination for driving in January 1928.
- Assistant Shunter Morland – The shunter had seen the drivers error and had failed to act despite having the power to do so. Had Shunter Morland taken the initiative the accident might have been prevented.
- The report also lays some of the blame with the railway company, namely London and North Eastern Railways for :-
- Lack of driver training: The report states that something more that a signature in a "Road Book" is needed when it comes to establishing driver understanding. It adds that this is of particular importance to younger drivers with less experience, and also that the matter has been raised in the past.
- Signalling at Darlington Platform East: The report states that certain terms used at Darlington South may not match the description in the General Rule Book. It goes on to say that LNER are unwilling at present to alter this practice and also suggests the use of 3-aspect signalling.
- That the accident could have been prevented by the use of Automatic Train Control.

== Staff involved ==
- Signalman J.T.Robson, Platform East Signal Box
- Signalman Thomas Walls, Darlington South Junction Signal Box
- Signalman James Garrett, Darlington South Junction Signal Box
- Assistant Shunter Michael Morland, Darlington Station Yard
- Stationmaster Beeby
- Station Foreman William Morley, Darlington Station
- Driver D.McNulty, Driver Excursion Train
- Fireman V.R.Bryant, Fireman Excursion Train
- Passenger Guard F.Hadwin, Guard Excursion Train
- Driver R.J.Bell, Driver Parcels Train
- Fireman J.J.McCormack, Fireman Parcels Train
- Passenger Guard J.H.Sharp, Guard Parcels Train

== Sources ==
- Colonel J W Pringle (3 November 1928). "Report on the Accident at Darlington on 27th June 1928" (PDF).
