= Broomielaw railway station =

Disused railway station in Broomielaw, County Durham

Broomielaw
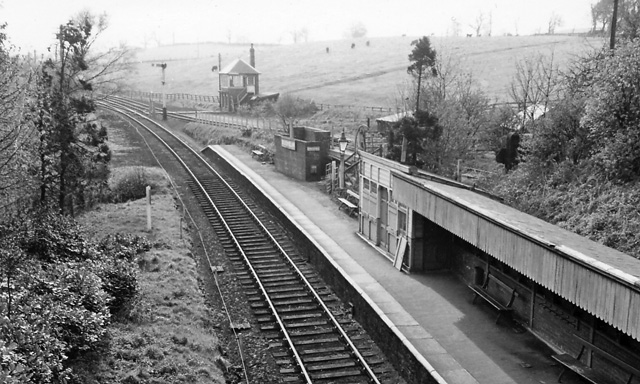
- The site of the station, looking west towards Barnard Castle, in 1965

General information
- Location: Broomielaw, County Durham; England
- Coordinates: 54.559°N 1.8732°W
- Grid reference: NZ083182
- Platforms: 1

Other information
- Status: Disused

History
- Original company: Darlington and Barnard Castle Railway
- Pre-grouping: Stockton and Darlington Railway; North Eastern Railway
- Post-grouping: LNER; British Railways (North Eastern)

Key dates
- 8 July 1856: Opened (private)
- 9 June 1942: Opened to the public
- 30 November 1964: Closed to passengers
- 5 April 1965: Closed to goods
Location

Broomielaw railway station co-served the hamlet of Broomielaw, County Durham, England, from 1856 to 1965 on the Darlington and Barnard Castle Railway.

== History ==
The station was opened on 8 July 1856 by the Darlington and Barnard Castle Railway. It was situated on the west side of a minor road. It was first used privately by the Bowes-Lyon family who lived in Streatlam Castle. It was also used by children for excursions. It opened to the public on 9 June 1942, although it only showed as publicly opened in 1944 handbook of stations. It was shown as Broomilaw in Clinker's papers of 1945. To the north was a siding controlled by a signal box to the west. The station closed to passengers on 30 November 1964 and closed to goods on 5 April 1965.

Preceding station	Disused railways	Following station
Barnard Castle; Line and station closed	Darlington and Barnard Castle Railway	Winston; Line and station closed
