= Heighington railway station =

Railway station in County Durham, England

Heighington
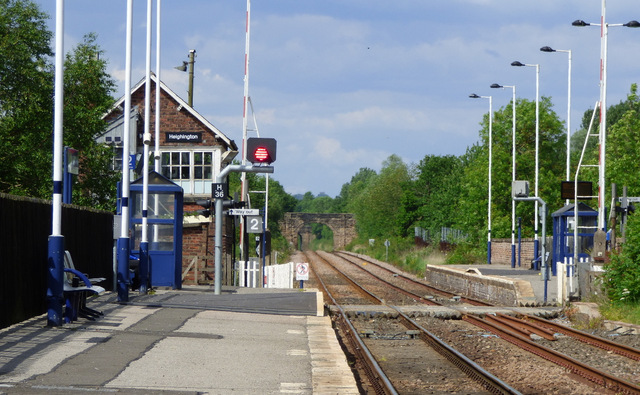

General information
- Location: Heighington, County Durham; England
- Coordinates: 54°35′50″N 1°34′54″W
- Grid reference: NZ271224
- Owner: Network Rail
- Manager: Northern Trains
- Platforms: 2
- Tracks: 2

Other information
- Station code: HEI
- Classification: DfT category F2

History
- Original company: Stockton and Darlington Railway
- Pre-grouping: North Eastern Railway
- Post-grouping: London and North Eastern Railway, British Rail (North Eastern Region)

Key dates
- April 1826: Opened as Aycliffe Lane (horse-drawn)
- 1833: Operating 100% steam locomotives
- 1847: Renamed Aycliffe and Heighington
- 1 July 1871: Renamed Aycliffe
- 1 September 1874: Renamed Heighington

Passengers
- 2021/22: ▲29,072
- 2022/23: ▲35,028
- 2023/24: ▼34,084
- 2024/25: ▲37,274
- 2025/26: ▲40,588
Location
- Location within County Durham Location within England Location within the United Kingdom Location within Europe
Notes
- Passenger statistics from the Office of Rail and Road

Heighington is a railway station on the Tees Valley Line, which runs between Bishop Auckland and Saltburn via Darlington. The station, situated 5 miles 62 chains (9.3 km) north-west of Darlington, serves the villages of Aycliffe and Heighington in County Durham, England. It is owned by Network Rail and managed by Northern Trains. It is possibly the world's first railway station, according to Historic England.

The station is on the Bishop Line, which is a community railway between Bishop Auckland and Darlington. It is somewhat unusual in that its platforms are staggered, sited either side of a level crossing. The station has kept its listed manual signal box (which supervises the aforementioned crossing, the connection into the Hitachi plant and the single line section south of here through to Darlington), but this had its semaphore signals replaced by colour lights when the connection into the Hitachi factory was installed and commissioned in November 2014.

== History ==
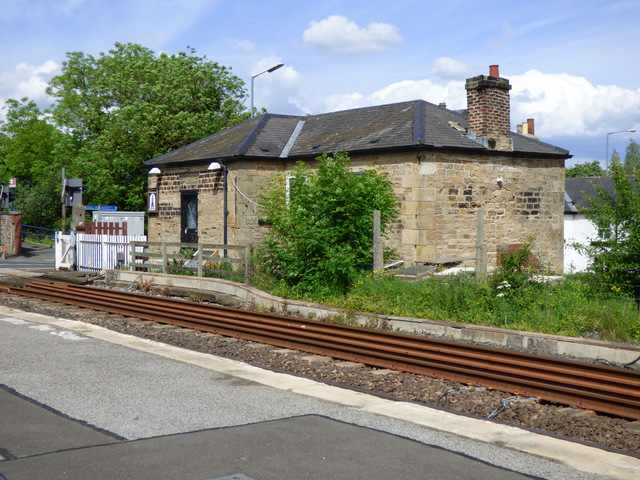
Early building at Heighington station

The station lies on the route of the Stockton and Darlington Railway (S&DR), the first public railway to use locomotives and the first to carry passengers and mixed goods as part of its Act of Parliament. As a result, it is widely accepted as the first modern railway, providing a model which soon spread around the world. The station used horse-drawn coaches until 1833 when it became a fully steam traction railway like the Liverpool and Manchester Railway which opened in 1830.

It was here in 1825 that Locomotion No. 1, designed by George Stephenson, was placed on the track before its first journey. Once it was placed on the line and all was ready, it was found that nobody had means of lighting the boiler. Stephenson sent a messenger to get a lit lantern. However, at this point a navvy called Robert Metcalf stepped forward and offered use of his burning glass, which he used to light his pipe. It was with this that Stephenson was able to light the boiler for that first journey.

The main line of the S&DR was opened on 27 September 1825 from Phoenix Colliery at Etherley to Stockton. Heighington Station was built in 1826 and opened in 1827 to meet the demand from passenger and railway users for facilities and in effect became the world's first railside station built by a railway company. Originally named Aycliffe Lane, it was subsequently renamed three times: first to Aycliffe and Heighington, later, on 1 July 1871, it became Aycliffe, although this name lasted for just over three years because, on 1 September 1874, it gained the present name of Heighington.

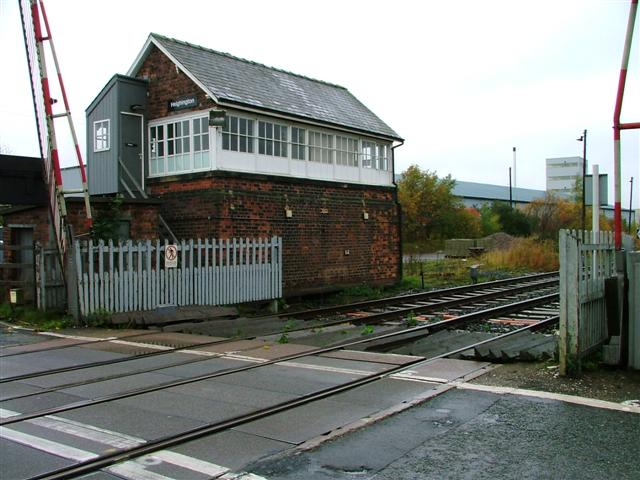
The signal box at Heighington station

The grade II listed signal box was opened in 1872 and was originally commissioned by the North Eastern Railway Central Division. It is one of the earliest signal boxes in the country still in existence, and it is believed that at most only four predate it. The design was possibly by Thomas Prosser, the company's architect. The building fits the earliest Central Division design, which the Signalling Study Group classified as Type C1.

The original signal lever frame mechanism was replaced in 1906. At the time of its inspection prior to gaining listed status in 2007, this 1906 mechanism was still in use. The lever frame was extended around 1912. The extension to both the mechanism and building is believed to have been done in order to fit signalling controls for a new electrified line. The lever system was reduced to 11 levers in 1987. Its current switch panel and colour light signals were installed when the siding connection into the nearby Hitachi train factory was commissioned in 2014. This works to Tyne IECC towards Darlington over the single line and absolute block to Shildon to the north.

On the opposite side of the railway line are the Grade II* listed original station buildings dating from around 1826–27. The original design called for a public house which would act as a waiting room. The buildings no longer form part of the modern station and the pub, called the Locomotion Number 1, closed in 2017. A cobbled area outside the pub is believed to be part of the original 1825 station platform.

Since the closure of the pub in 2017, the site has become derelict and has been affected by vandalism and criminal damage. After the failure of rescue attempts by local authorities, the Friends of the Stockton & Darlington Railway launched a fundraising campaign to purchase and restore the station. In November 2024, Historic England placed the site on the Heritage at Risk Register.

=== Accidents and incidents ===
- On 1 July 1828, the boiler of Locomotion No. 1 exploded, killing the driver.

== Facilities ==
The station is unstaffed and has a card-only ticket machine, so all passengers wanting to buy tickets with cash must buy on board the train or prior to travel. The amenities here were improved as part of the Tees Valley Metro project in 2013. The package for this station included new fully lit waiting shelters, renewed station signage, digital CIS displays and the installation of CCTV (all of the Tees Valley line stations apart from Teesside Airport and British Steel Redcar have been upgraded and provided with CIS displays). The long-line public-address system (PA) has been renewed and upgraded with pre-recorded train announcements. Running information can also be obtained by telephone and timetable poster boards. Step-free access is available to both platforms via ramps from the crossing.

== Services ==
The station is served by an hourly service between Saltburn and Bishop Auckland, via Darlington. All services are operated by Northern Trains.

Rolling stock used: Class 156 Super Sprinter and Class 158 Express Sprinter

| Preceding station | National Rail | Following station |
|---|---|---|
| North Road | Northern Trains; Tees Valley Line | Newton Aycliffe |
| | Historical railways | |
| Darlington North Road | North Eastern Railway; Stockton and Darlington Railway | Shildon |

== Intercity Express Programme factory ==
The new Hitachi Intercity Express Programme train assembly plant was built not far from the station in the Aycliffe Business Park and opened in 2015. Work commenced on the £82 million facility in March 2014 and it was officially opened on 3 September 2015 by UK Prime Minister David Cameron. The factory has a rail connection to the running line controlled from the station signal box to allow for delivery of the new sets once completed (there are also 4.3 miles (7 km) of sidings and a 0.62 mi (1 km) long electrified test track within the plant). The new Class 800/801 IEP sets will be built or fitted out here for use on the East Coast Main Line and Great Western Main Line, along with Class 385 (AT200) commuter EMUs destined for use on Scottish suburban routes around Glasgow and Edinburgh.
