= Winston railway station =

Disused railway station in Winston, County Durham

Winston
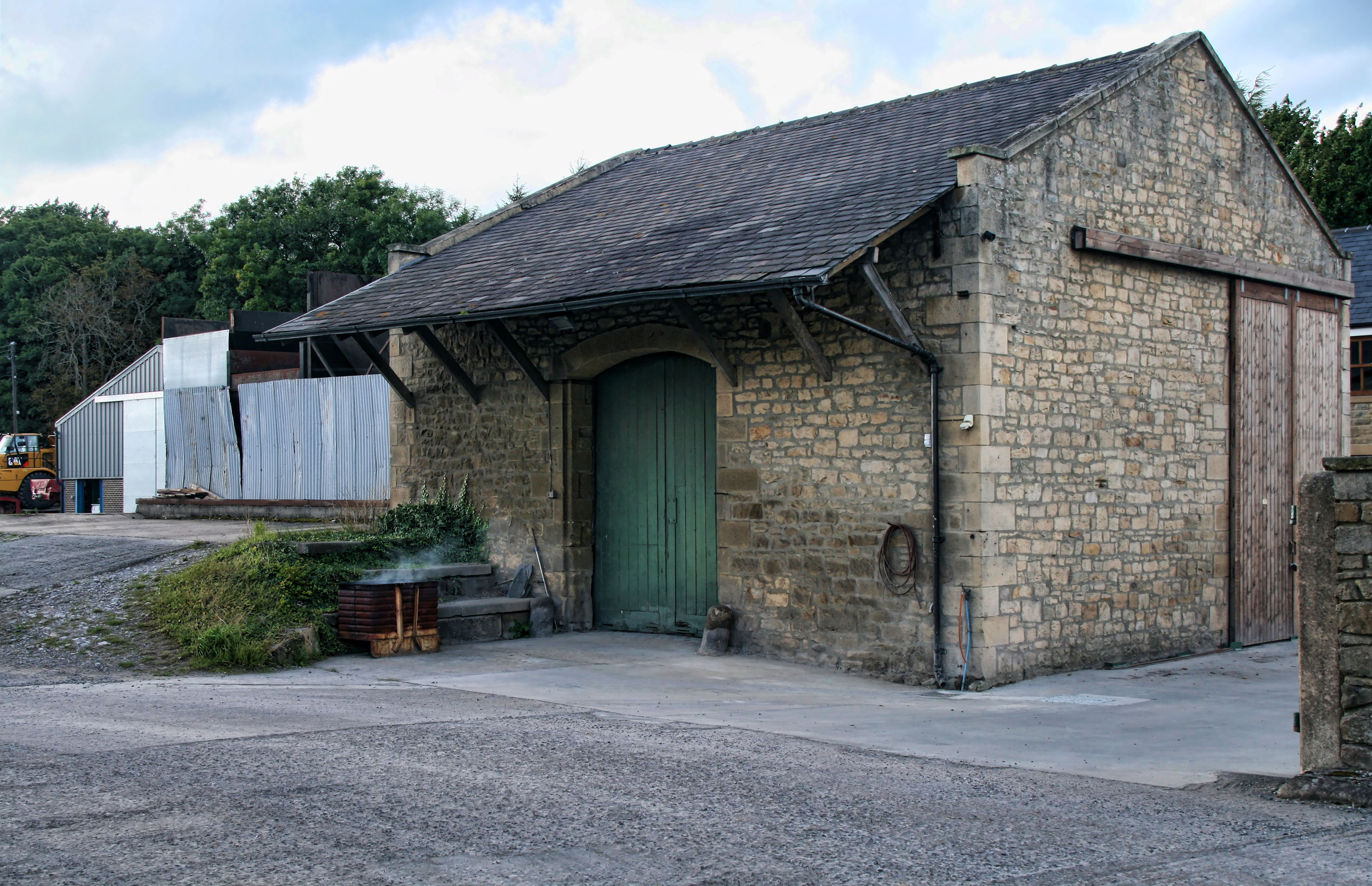
- The former goods shed in 2011

General information
- Location: Winston, County Durham; England
- Coordinates: 54.5553°N 1.785°W
- Grid reference: NZ140178
- Platforms: 2

Other information
- Status: Disused

History
- Original company: Darlington and Barnard Castle Railway
- Pre-grouping: North Eastern Railway
- Post-grouping: London and North Eastern Railway

Key dates
- 9 July 1856: Opened
- 30 November 1964: Closed to passengers
- 5 April 1965: Closed to goods
Location

Winston railway station served the village of Winston, County Durham, England, from 1856 to 1965 on the Darlington and Barnard Castle Railway.

== History ==
The station was opened on 9 July 1856 by the Darlington and Barnard Castle Railway. It was situated at either side of the B6274. It was referred to as Staindrop by the company before it opened. On the up platform was the station building and on the down platform was a waiting shelter. Opposite the up platform was the goods yard which had two sidings: one serving the goods yard and the other serving a coal depot. A third siding was added in 1894. It was referred to as Winston for Staindrop in 1937 and 1938 in Bradshaw and in every edition of the handbook of stations. The station closed to passengers on 30 November 1964 and closed to goods on 5 April 1965.

In the 1980s, whilst she was working as a television presenter, Wincey Willis lived on the site of the former station with her animals.

Preceding station	Disused railways	Following station
Broomielaw; Line and station closed	Darlington and Barnard Castle Railway	Gainford; Line and station closed
