= Gainford railway station =

Disused railway station in County Durham, England

Gainford
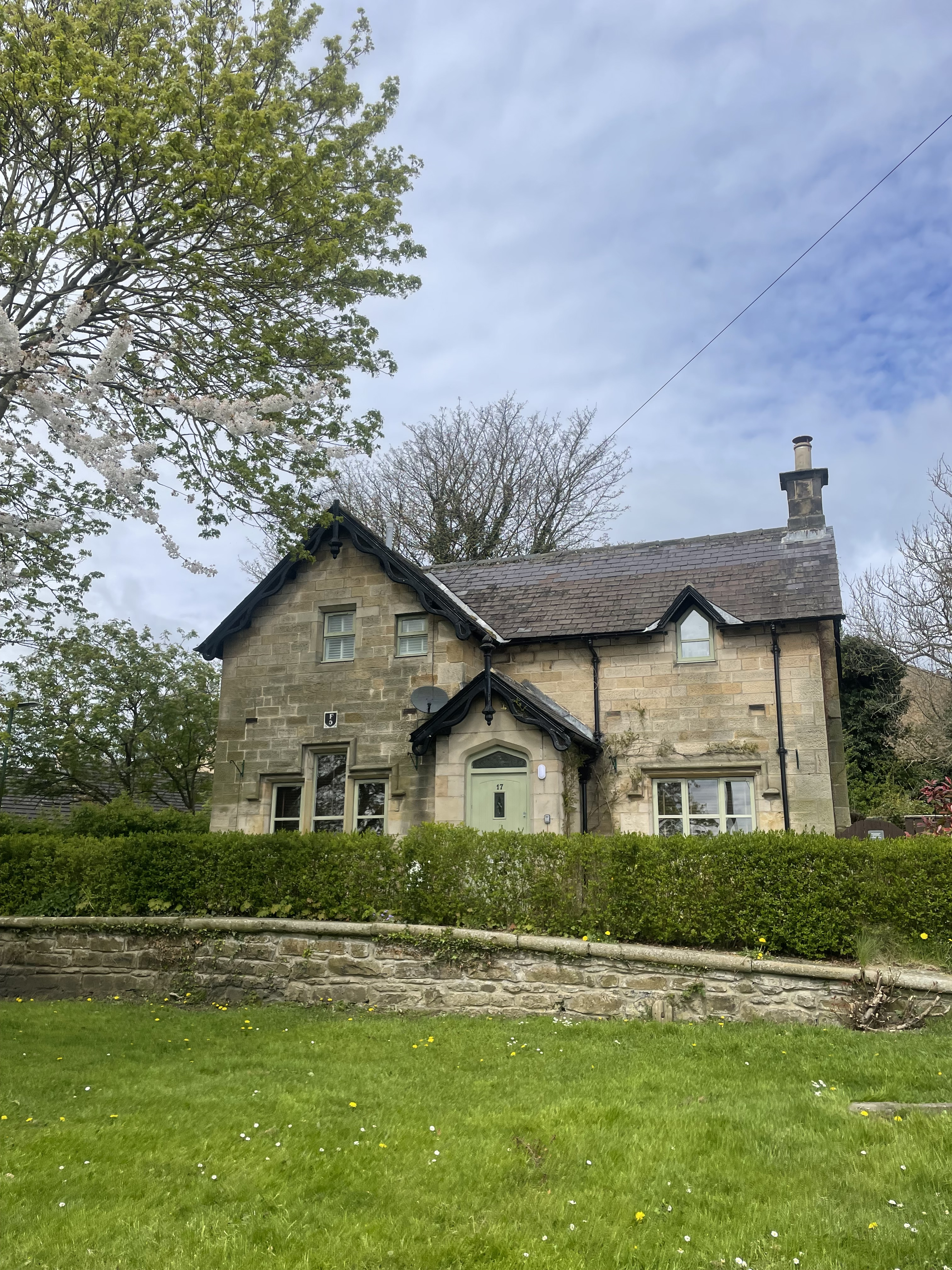
- Now a private residence

General information
- Location: Gainford, County Durham; England
- Coordinates: 54.5486°N 1.7380°W
- Grid reference: NZ170171
- Platforms: 1

Other information
- Status: Disused

History
- Original company: Darlington and Barnard Castle Railway
- Pre-grouping: North Eastern Railway (UK)

Key dates
- 9 July 1856: Opened
- 30 November 1964: Closed to passengers
- 5 April 1965: Closed
Location

Gainford railway station is a disused station in Gainford, County Durham, North East England, on the Darlington and Barnard Castle Railway.

On 24 October 1905 there was an accident between Gainford and Winston at Grand bank near Tees Bridge in which 2 NER 0-6-0 engines were derailed when they ran onto track where a rail had been removed for maintenance.

Preceding station	Disused railways	Following station
Piercebridge; Line and station closed	North Eastern Railway; Darlington and Barnard Castle Railway	Winston; Line and station closed
