= North Road railway station =

Railway station in County Durham, England

North Road North Road (Darlington)
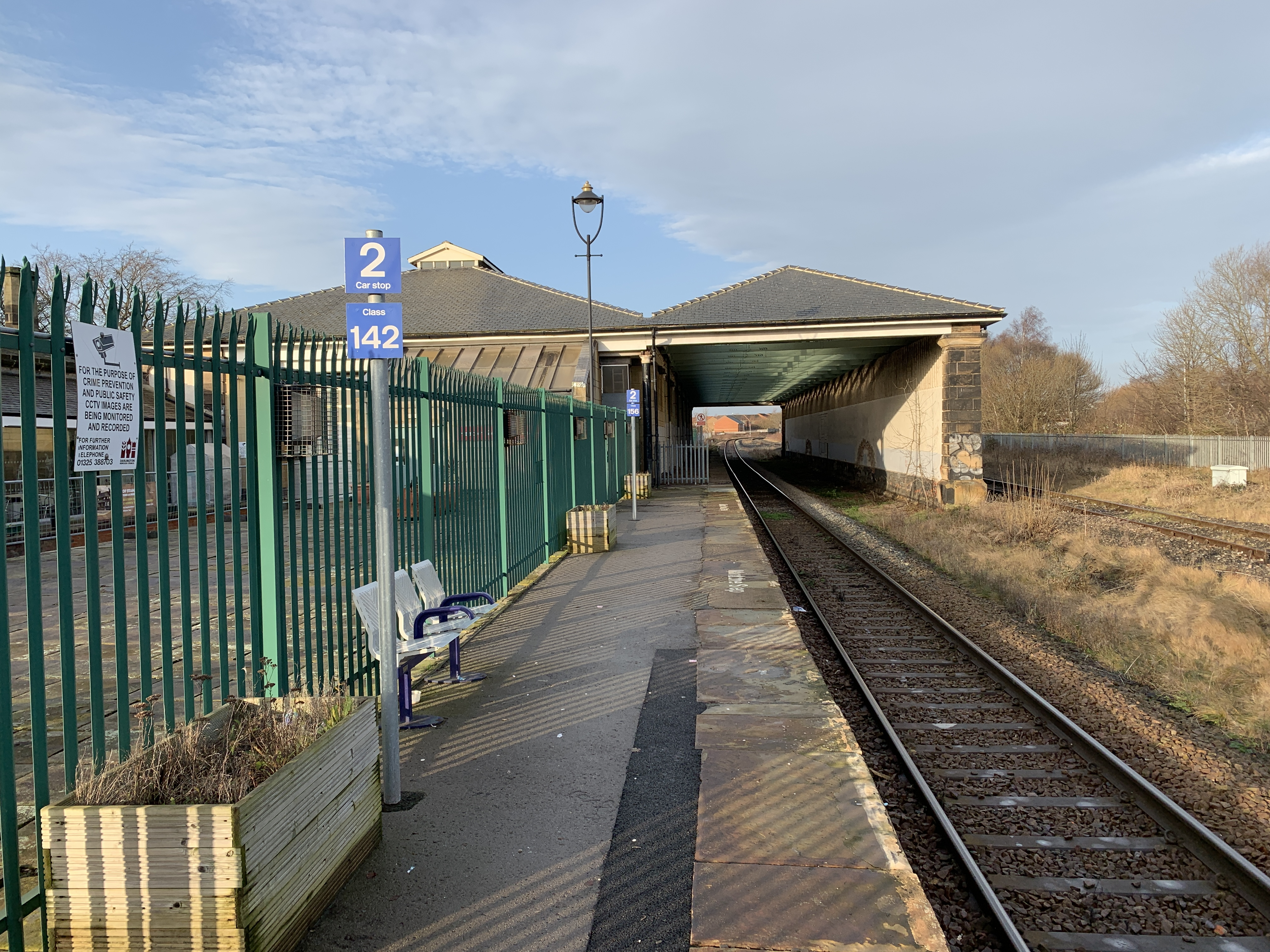

General information
- Location: Darlington, Borough of Darlington; England
- Coordinates: 54°32′08″N 1°33′14″W
- Grid reference: NZ289157
- Owner: Network Rail
- Manager: Northern Trains
- Platforms: 1
- Tracks: 1

Other information
- Station code: NRD
- Classification: DfT category F2

History
- Original company: Stockton and Darlington Railway
- Pre-grouping: North Eastern Railway
- Post-grouping: London and North Eastern Railway; British Rail (North Eastern Region)

Key dates
- 1 April 1842: Opened as Darlington
- 1 October 1868: Renamed Darlington North Road
- 1 September 1934: Renamed North Road

Passengers
- 2021/22: ▲43,168
- 2022/23: ▲47,222
- 2023/24: ▼42,044
- 2024/25: ▲51,248
- 2025/26: ▲65,882

Listed Building – Grade II*
- Feature: Original Stockton and Darlington Railway station buildings
- Designated: 28 April 1952
- Reference no.: 1322962
Location
- Location within County Durham
Notes
- Passenger statistics from the Office of Rail and Road

North Road is a railway station on the Tees Valley Line, which runs between Bishop Auckland and Saltburn via Darlington. The station, situated 1 mile 23 chains (2.1 km) north-west of Darlington, serves the market town of Darlington in County Durham, England. It is owned by Network Rail and managed by Northern Trains.

== History ==
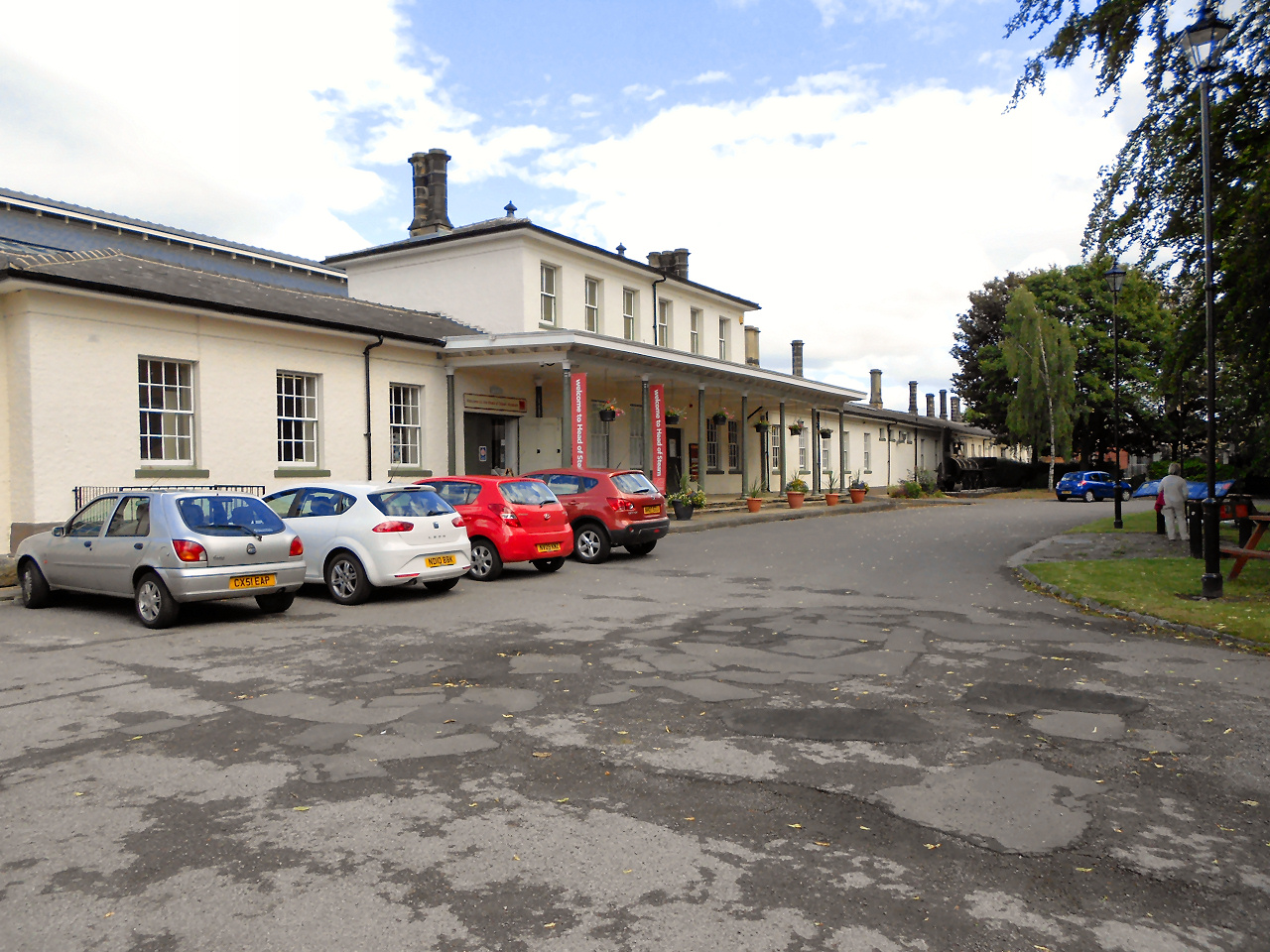
The station portico

The railway station is closely linked with the history of the Stockton and Darlington Railway, being the site of the original Darlington station. The station building, now a museum entitled Hopetown, was first opened in 1842 and is listed Grade II*. It replaced a depot on the opposite side of North Road, built in 1833. The building was constructed to a design by the S&D resident engineer of the time John Harris and was expanded and rebuilt on several subsequent occasions (e.g. in 1856 following the opening of the line to Barnard Castle and again in 1864 and 1876 by the NER and their main architect William Peachey).

The opening of the main line station at Bank Top in 1887 saw the importance of North Road decline and it was twice threatened with closure in the 20th century (initially in 1930 and again under the Beeching cuts of 1963), but was reprieved each time. The closure of the Stainmore route to Penrith in 1962 and the Middleton-in-Teesdale branch line two years later did see the route through here reduced to single track (with only one platform remaining) and by the early 1970s, the train shed had suffered badly from vandalism and was in a poor state of repair. This prompted the local council, the town's tourist board, Darlington Museums service and a consortium of local people to join together to restore the station and Hopetown Works Complex nearby as a museum (formerly known as Head of Steam), whilst maintaining a single active platform for the Bishop Auckland branch line. This work was completed in time for the 150th anniversary of the Stockton & Darlington Railway in 1975, with the opening ceremony carried out by the Duke of Edinburgh.

Trains do not however stop under the train shed roof, instead using the eastern end of the platform in the open air.

== Facilities ==
The station is unstaffed but has a ticket machine (card only). A Harrington Hump has been installed to improve accessibility to the trains for mobility-impaired passengers and the waiting shelter here was replaced in 2015 as part of the Tees Valley line improvement programme - this also saw the installation of a digital CIS display, new signage and CCTV. Train running information is also available via the electronic display. The station is not listed as suitable for wheelchair users on the National Rail website due to the approach path being steeply graded.

== Services ==
As of the December 2025 timetable change, the station is served by an hourly service between Saltburn and Bishop Auckland via Darlington. All services are operated by Northern Trains.

Rolling stock used: Class 156 Super Sprinter and Class 158 Express Sprinter

Preceding station	National Rail	Following station
Darlington	Northern Trains; Tees Valley Line	Heighington
	Historical railways	
Fighting Cocks	North Eastern Railway; Stockton and Darlington Railway	Aycliffe Lane
	Disused railways	
Terminus	North Eastern Railway; Darlington and Barnard Castle Railway	Piercebridge
