= Darlington railway station =

Railway station in County Durham, England

Darlington
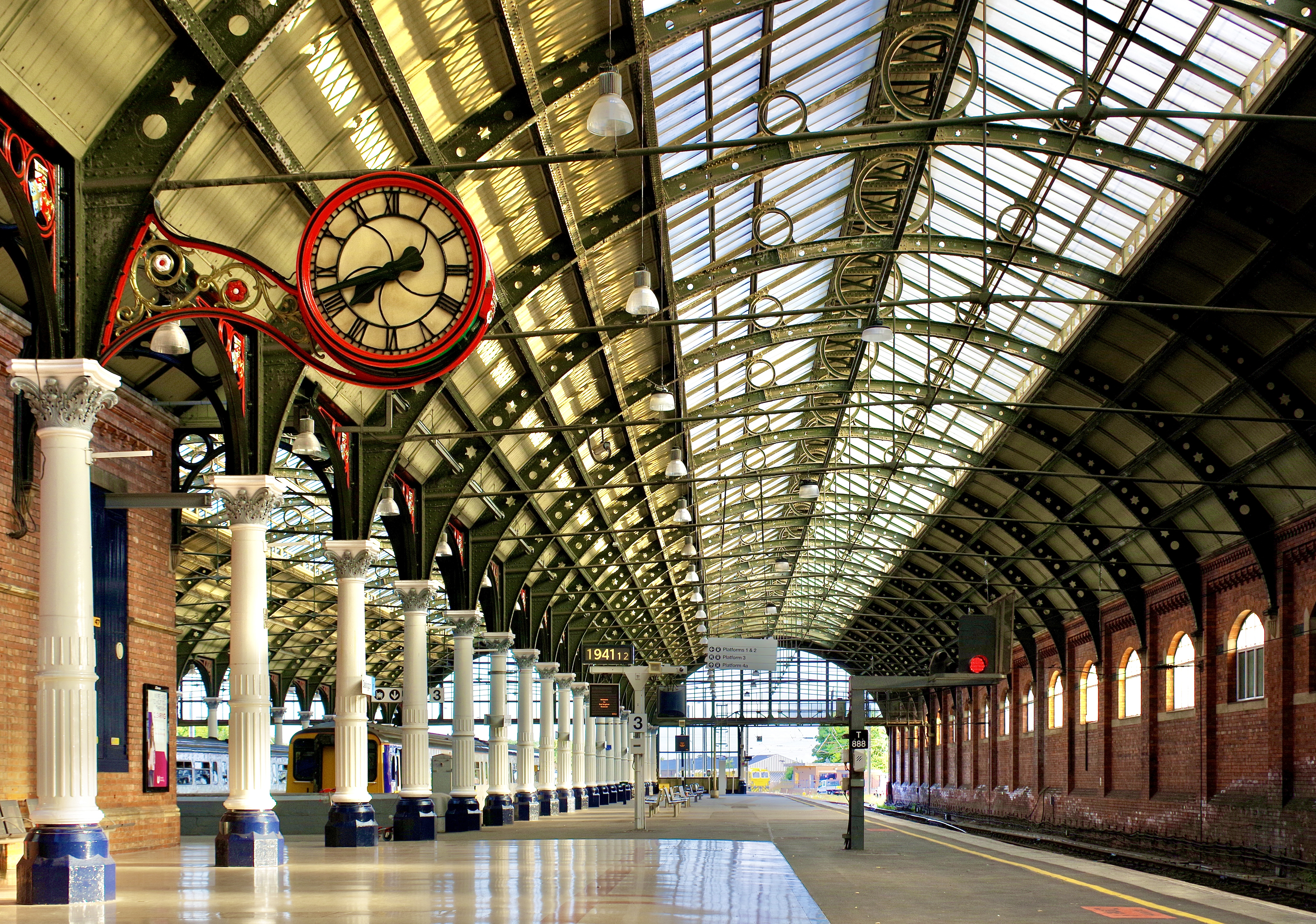
- Station concourse and platforms (2021)

General information
- Location: Darlington, County Durham, England
- Coordinates: 54°31′15″N 1°32′48″W
- Grid reference: NZ294140
- Owner: Network Rail
- Manager: London North Eastern Railway
- Platforms: 6

Other information
- Station code: DAR
- Classification: DfT category B

History
- Original company: Great North of England Railway
- Pre-grouping: North Eastern Railway
- Post-grouping: London and North Eastern Railway; British Rail (Eastern Region)

Key dates
- 31 March 1841: Opened as Darlington
- 1 October 1868: Renamed Darlington Bank Top
- 1 July 1887: Resited
- 1 September 1934: Renamed Darlington
- 17 May 2026: Platforms 5 and 6 opened

Passengers
- 2020/21: ▼0.538 million
- Interchange: ▼86,795
- 2021/22: ▲2.075 million
- Interchange: ▲0.361 million
- 2022/23: ▲2.220 million
- Interchange: ▲0.472 million
- 2023/24: ▲2.350 million
- Interchange: ▲0.486 million
- 2024/25: ▲2.827 million
- Interchange: ▲0.613 million

Listed Building – Grade II*
- Feature: Original North Eastern Railway station building
- Designated: 6 September 1977
- Reference no.: 1310079
Location
Notes
- Passenger statistics from the Office of Rail and Road

Darlington railway station serves the town of Darlington, in County Durham, England. It is a principal stop on the East Coast Main Line, 232 miles 50 chains (232.63 miles; 374.37 kilometres) north of London King's Cross; it lies between Northallerton to the south and Durham to the north. It is also the interchange for services to Bishop Auckland, Middlesbrough and Saltburn. The station is managed by London North Eastern Railway, which operates services along with CrossCountry, Northern Trains and TransPennine Express.

Darlington is the location of the first commercial steam railway, the Stockton and Darlington Railway. The station building is a Grade II* listed Victorian structure and winner of the Large Station of the Year award in 2005. The station was enlarged with two new platforms opening beside the freight by-pass lines in May 2026.

== History ==
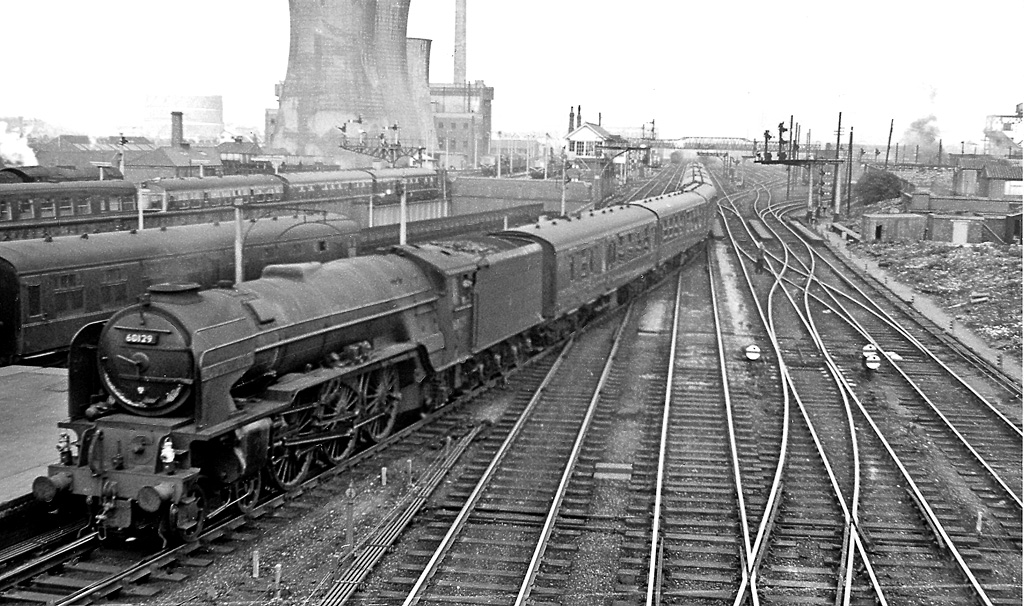
60129 Guy Mannering entering the station, 1961

The first railway to pass through the area now occupied by the station was built by the Stockton and Darlington Railway (S&D), which opened its mineral branch from Albert Hill Junction on the main line to Croft-on-Tees on 27 October 1829. A decade later, that branch line was purchased by the Great North of England Railway to incorporate into its new main line from York, which reached the town on 30 March 1841.

A separate company, the Newcastle & Darlington Junction Railway continued the new main line northwards towards Ferryhill and Newcastle, opening its route three years later on 19 June 1844. It crossed the S&D at Parkgate Junction by means of a flat crossing which, in future years, became something of an operational headache for the North Eastern Railway (NER) and London and North Eastern Railway.

The original Bank Top station, where the two routes met, was a modest affair. It was rebuilt in 1860 to accommodate the expanding levels of traffic on the main line. By the mid-1880s, even that replacement structure was deemed inadequate and the NER embarked on a major upgrade to facilities in the area. This included an ornate new station with an impressive three-span overall roof on the Bank Top site, new sidings and goods lines alongside it; there was also a new connecting line from the south end of the station, at Polam Junction, to meet the original S&D line towards Middlesbrough at Oak Tree Junction near Dinsdale. Those improvements were completed on 1 July 1887 and the old route west of Oak Tree was closed to passengers, although it remained in use for freight until 1967.

The new station, with its broad island platform, was designed by T.E. Harrison, chief engineer, and William Bell, the architect of the NER. It cost £81,000 (equivalent to £9,210,000 in 2025) to construct. It soon became a busy interchange on the main East Coast route, thanks to its rail links to Richmond (opened in 1846), Barnard Castle and Penrith (1862/5), and the Tees Valley Line to Bishop Auckland (1842) and Saltburn (1861).

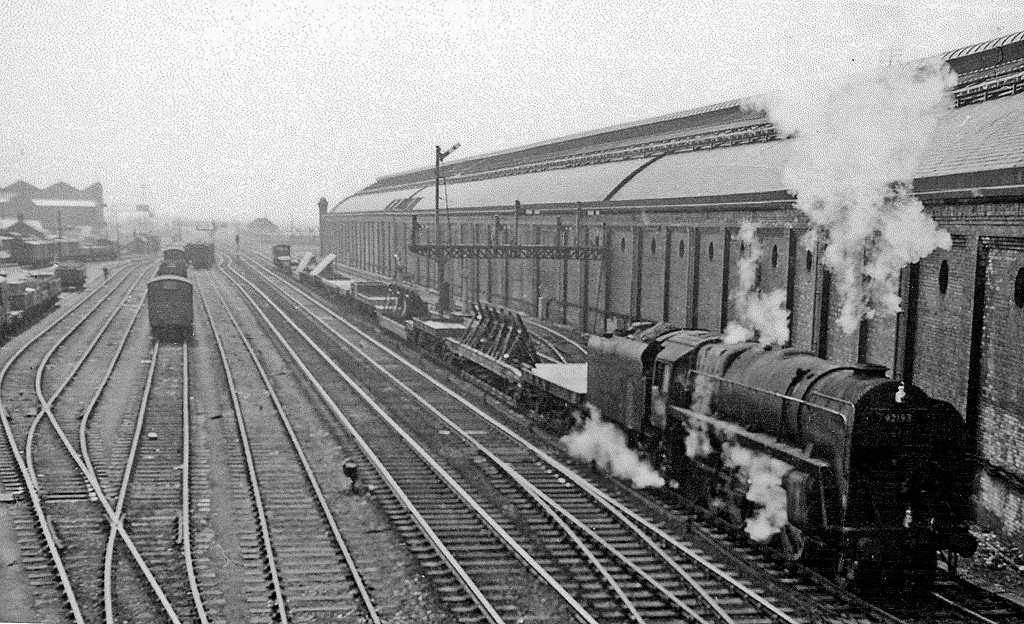
A down freight passing the station (1961)

The lines to Penrith (closed in 1962), Barnard Castle (1964) and Richmond (1969) have now gone; the bays at the northern end of the station are now used for car parking. The main line, which was electrified in 1991, remains busy, as does the Tees Valley route. It is still possible to travel to Scotch Corner and Richmond by means of the Arriva North East-operated X26 and X27 buses. The same company also operated the Sky Express bus service to Durham Tees Valley Airport from the station, but that was withdrawn in January 2009 due to declining demand.

HS2 trains were originally planned to stop at Darlington as part of the eastern leg, but Phase 2b was cancelled as part of the Integrated Rail Plan; the whole second phase of HS2 was cancelled in 2023.

On 28 September 2025, a replica of Locomotion No. 1 visited the station as part of Railway 200.

=== Tees Valley Metro ===
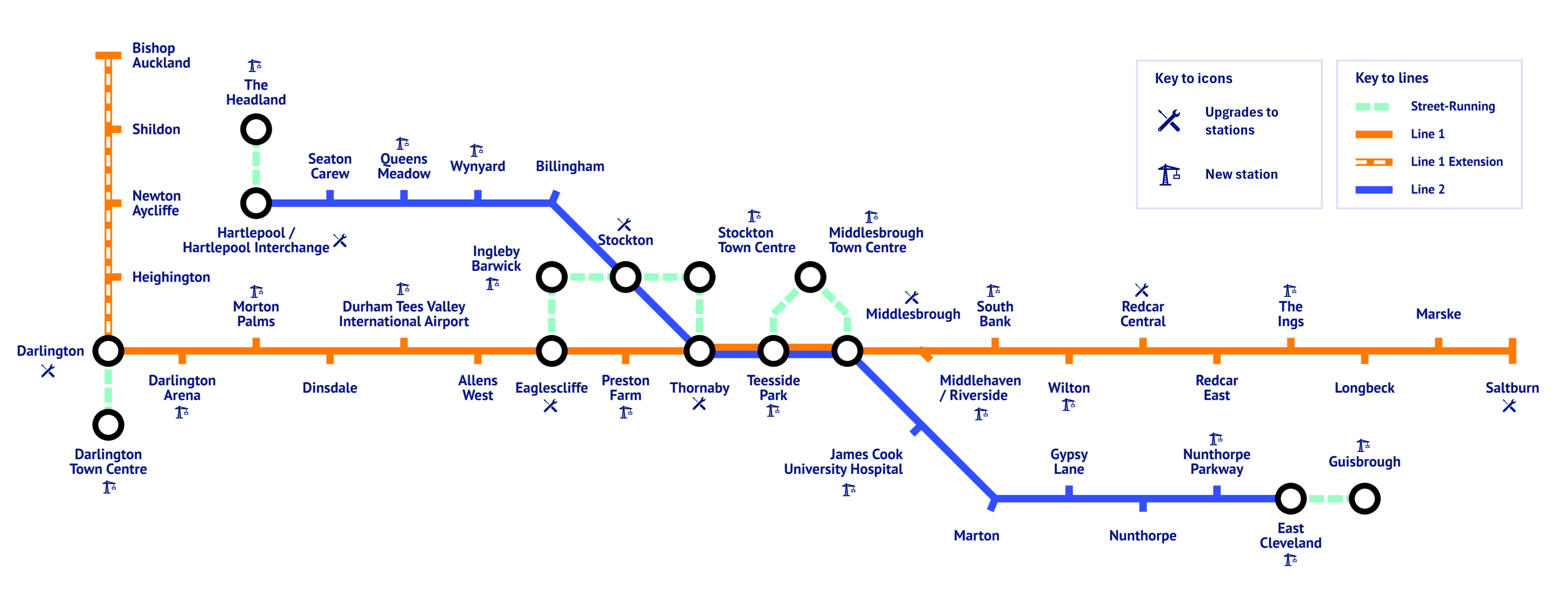
A transit diagram, showcasing all discussed or mentioned ideas for the Tees Valley Metro

Starting in 2006, Darlington was mentioned within the Tees Valley Metro scheme. This was a plan to upgrade the Tees Valley line, and sections of the Esk Valley line and Durham Coast Line, to provide a faster and more frequent service across the North East of England. In the initial phases, the services would have been heavy rail mostly along existing alignments, with new additional infrastructure and rolling stock. The later phase would have introduced tram-trains, to allow street running and further heavy rail extensions; there were suggestions to have the metro extended west to Bishop Auckland from Darlington.

Darlington was a major part of the scheme and so had some of the largest proposed improvements. To reduce the need for local services to cross the East Coast Main Line (ECML), two new eastern platforms would have been created. The new platforms would be connected to the main building by a new footbridge and lifts; the existing car parking places that would have been lost with the new platforms would be replaced at a similar distance from the station. A new entrance, including pick-up/drop-off facilities, was considered on the eastern side. Furthermore, release of track capacity on the ECML to allow more trains to run from Darlington to York and Newcastle, with an improved service to Saltburn; (Note: From one/two to four trains per hour.) new rolling stock was also proposed. While unclear and never having concrete plans, street-running trams to Darlington town centre were also proposed in a future phase of the Metro.

However, due to the 2008 financial crisis and a change in government in 2010, the project was ultimately shelved. Several stations were eventually improved, with a possibility of improved rolling stock and services in the future.

=== Station upgrade ===
As part of a £140 million investment, the station has been redeveloped to increase the reliability, connectivity and accessibility of the station; the plan resurrects many features of the abandoned Tees Valley Metro. The project includes the construction of a new concourse, multi-storey car park and two new platforms on the current freight avoiding lines. The Tees Valley Combined Authority contributed £43 million towards the upgrade, with the other £96 million being supplied by Network Rail and the Department for Transport. Other key stakeholders in the project include LNER, which manages the station, and Darlington Borough Council.

The upgrade included the construction of a new eastern concourse, two new platforms, the remodelling of the track layout and a new bridge over the railway on Smithfield Road. The upgrade also includes work to the overhead line equipment and installation of new points and cabling. The project was scheduled to finish in 2025 as part of the Railway 200 celebrations, but this was delayed because of the complex design of the footbridge.

The East Coast Main Line was closed over six weekends in early 2025 in order to facilitate this work; many other smaller projects made use of the closure, including track work at Chester-le-Street and the Allerdene bridge near Newcastle was demolished. A 50-tonne footbridge was installed during these closures in February 2025, to connect the existing building with the two new platforms.

The upgrade was completed in May 2026. The redeveloped station was opened officially by rail minister Lord Hendy and Tees Valley Combined Authority mayor Ben Houchen on 15 May, with the new platforms receiving their first trains two days later.

=== Accidents and incidents ===
- On 16 November 1910, an express freight train overran signals and was involved in a rear-end collision with another freight train.
- On 27 June 1928, a parcels train and an excursion train were involved in a head-on collision. 25 people were killed and 45 were injured.
- On 11 December 1968, a Newcastle to Kings Cross express train was derailed at the south end of the station after passing a signal at danger. No-one was hurt.
- On 16 February 1977, an express passenger train hauled by Class 55 Deltic locomotive no. 55008 collided with an empty stock train after failing to stop at Darlington. The guard of the express was slightly injured. The cause of the accident was that the brakes on the carriages had become isolated whilst the train was moving in a freak event. The train had struck an object on the track, which had caused a traction motor cover to come lose. This struck the handle of the brake isolating cock, closing it and thus separating the brakes between the locomotive and train. Following the collision, the train was diverted onto the Tees Valley line, where it was brought to a halt by the operation of the communication cord in one of the carriages.
- On 3 October 2009, a Class 142 Pacer unit, operated by Northern Rail, hit the rear end of a departing National Express East Coast service. Three passengers from the Northern Rail train were taken to hospital with minor injuries.

== Facilities ==
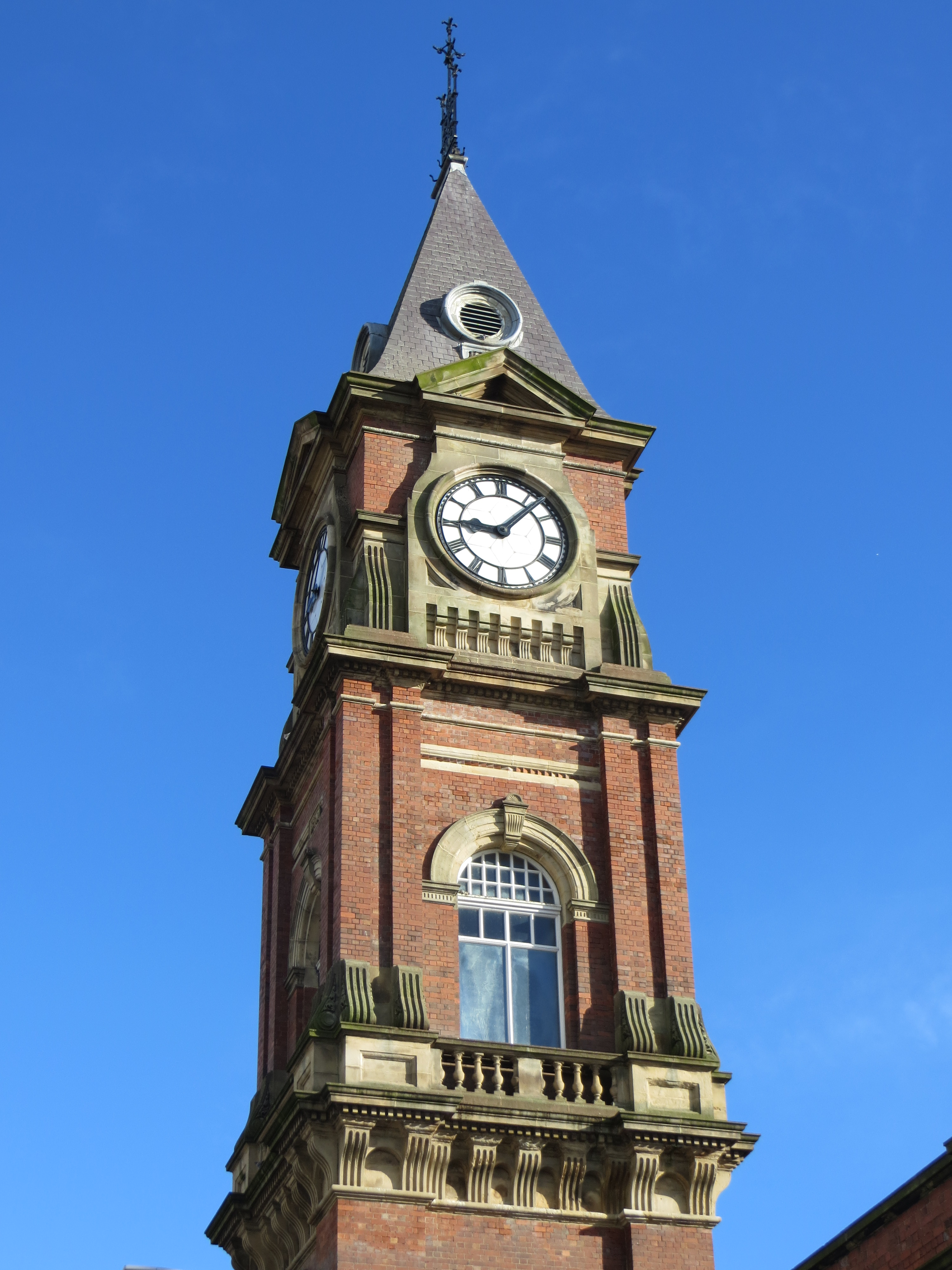
The station's clock tower

The station is fully staffed and the ticket office is open throughout the week. (Note: Opening hours are 06:00–20:00/21:00 weekdays, 06:30–19:45 Saturdays, 07:45–20:00 Sundays.) There is a waiting room and a first class lounge on the platform. (Note: The lounge is open between 06:00 and 20:00 each day; on Sundays, it opens at 08:00.) Self-service ticket machines are also provided for use.

Train running information is offered via digital passenger information system displays, announcements and timetable posters. Step-free access to all platforms is via ramps from the subway, linking the platforms with the main entrance and car park.

Several retail outlets are located in the main buildings, including a coffee shop, grocer and newsagent. Vending machines, toilets, a photo booth, payphone and cash machines are also provided.

== Platform layout ==
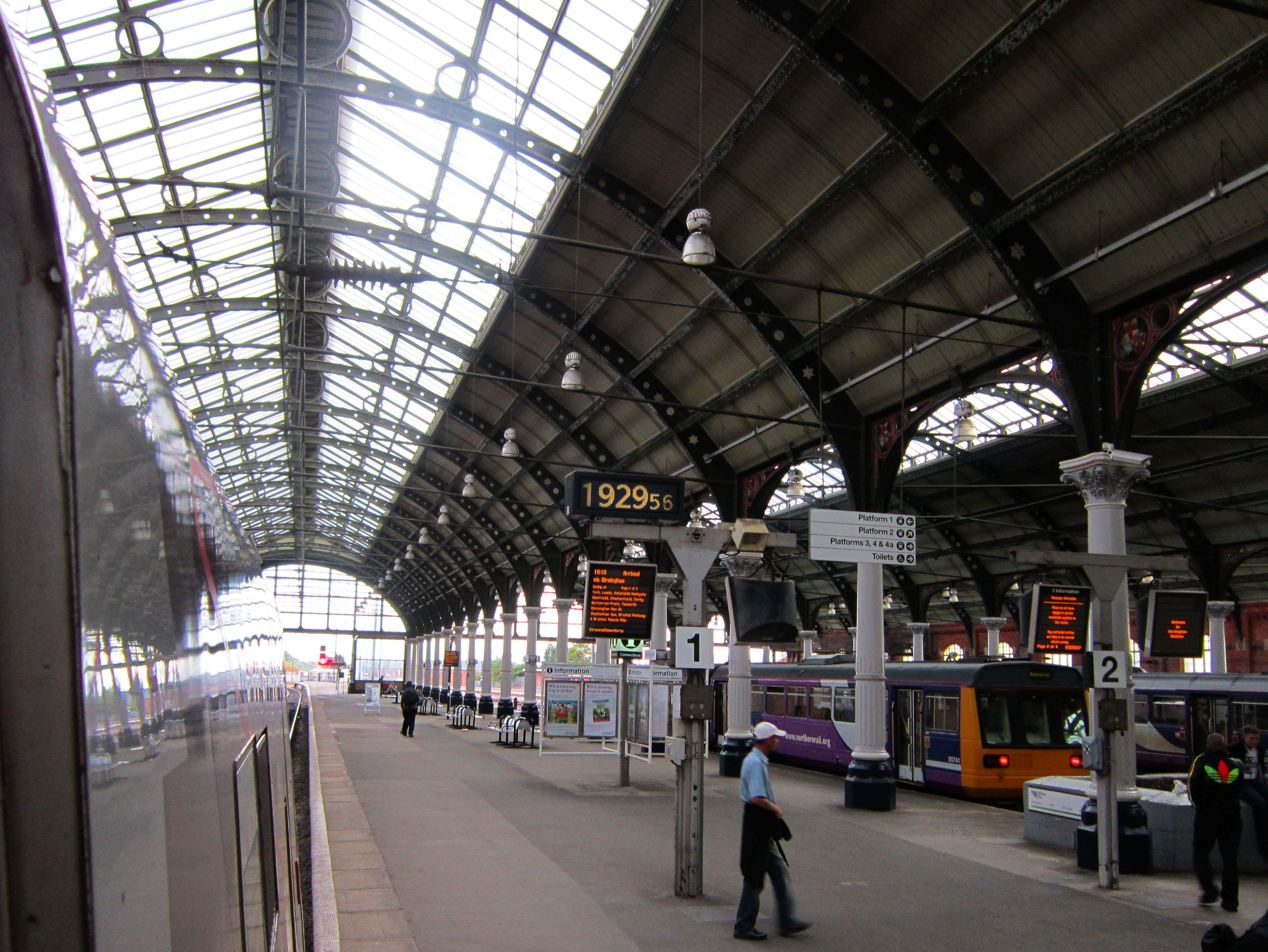
A view of platforms 1 and 2

Darlington station has six main platforms; 1-4 under the train shed and 5-6 sited by the freight by-pass lines, connected via a footbridge:

1. for some northbound and southbound London North Eastern Railway (LNER) and CrossCountry (XC) services; also some southbound TransPennine Express (TPE) services
2. a south-facing bay used by some Northern Trains (NT) services terminating here from Saltburn; some TPE trains on diesel power terminate here when there are delays, to allow them to run subsequent southbound services back on time
3. as platform 2, although used less frequently
4. is a northbound platform for LNER, XC and TPE services, plus NT services to Bishop Auckland. Platform 4a is a southern extension of 4, for trains waiting at Darlington to be bypassed by those stopping at platform 4; TPE also uses 4a occasionally if services using Class 802 units on electric power have to terminate early when there are delays, to allow them to run subsequent southbound services back on time (Note: This is because the lines at platforms 2 and 3 are not electrified.)
5. a new platform, which is used for most southbound LNER, XC and TPE services
6. the other new platform, which is used for most NT services to and from Saltburn.

== Services ==
Darlington is served by four train operating companies, which provide the following general off-peak service pattern in trains per hour/day (tph/tpd):

London North Eastern Railway:

- 2 tph to London King's Cross, via York
- 1 tph to Edinburgh Waverley, via Newcastle; of which:
  - 3 tpd extend to Aberdeen, via Dundee
  - 1 tpd extends to Inverness, via Stirling and Perth
- 1 tph to Newcastle.

CrossCountry:

- 1 tph to Edinburgh Waverley, via Newcastle; of which:
  - 2 tpd extend to Glasgow Central
  - 1 tpd extends to Aberdeen, via Dundee
- 1 tph to Plymouth, via York, Leeds, Sheffield, Derby, Birmingham New Street, Bristol Temple Meads and Exeter St Davids; of which:
  - 1 tpd extends to Penzance
- 1 tp2h to Newcastle
- 1 tp2h to Reading, via York, Doncaster, Sheffield, Derby, Birmingham New Street and Oxford.

TransPennine Express:

- 1 tph to Newcastle, via Durham and Chester-le-Street
- 1 tph to Liverpool Lime Street, via York, Leeds, Huddersfield and Manchester Victoria.

Northern Trains:

- 2 tph to Saltburn, via Middlesbrough and Redcar Central
- 1 tph to Bishop Auckland
- 2 tpd to Newcastle
- 1 tpd to Carlisle, via Newcastle.

Preceding station	National Rail	Following station
York	CrossCountry	Durham
Northallerton	TransPennine Express North TransPennine	Durham
Northallerton	London North Eastern Railway; East Coast Main Line	Durham
York	London North Eastern Railway; London-Newcastle/Edinburgh/Scotland express or Leeds-Aberdeen	Newcastle
Dinsdale	Northern Tees Valley Line	North Road
Dinsdale	Northern Tees Valley Line	Durham
	Future services	
York	TBA; Northern Powerhouse Rail	Newcastle
	Historical railways	
Croft Spa; Line open, station closed	North Eastern Railway; York, Newcastle and Berwick Railway	Aycliffe; Line open, station closed
