= List of crossings of the River Esk, North Yorkshire =

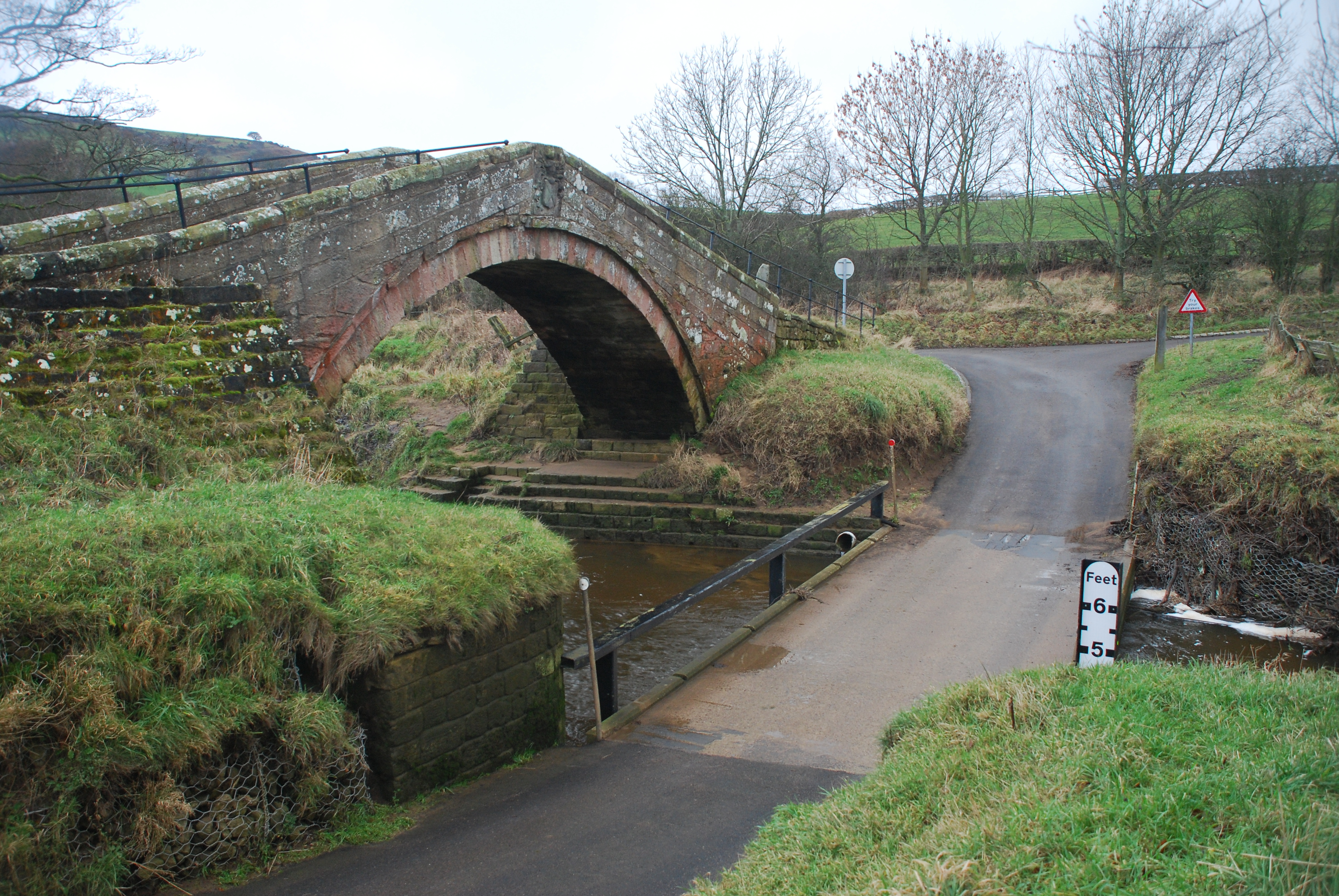
Duck Bridge Ford near Danby

This is a list of current bridges and other crossings of the River Esk and are listed from source downstream to the river's mouth. The River Esk rises near Westerdale and is the combination of several small streams known as "Esklets". The river valley has been beset by serious flooding in 1828, 1880, and 1930. Several bridges were lost during the floods of 1930. Most of the railway bridges have numbers, rather than names according to the Engineer's Line Reference.

The river has been crossed by many fords although most are now not in everyday use. Some of these fords are referred to as a "wath", which is from the Old Norse vað meaning ford. Examples of this are at Briggswath, Hellawath (in Glaisdale), and Bluewath Beck (in Egton).

== Source to Glaisdale ==
Crossing	Location	Type	Co-ordinates	Date opened	Listing	Notes	Ref
Osseker Crook Bridge (Foot)	Westerdale	Foot	54.4390°N 0.9871°W	Unknown	N/A		
Upper Esk Road bridge	Westerdale	Road	54.4464°N 0.9798°W	Unknown	N/A	Opened to replace traffic having to use Hunter's Sty Bridge adjacent to the east	
Hunter's Sty Bridge	Westerdale	Packhorse	54.4465°N 0.9795°W	c. late 13th century	Scheduled monument		
Dibble Bridge	Castleton	Road	54.4618°N 0.9590°W	c. 1720	II	A bridge was mentioned at this location in 1301 and 1539, though the current bridge dates back to the early 18th century.	
Bow Bridge	Castleton	Road	54.4663°N 0.9446°W	1873	N/A	Built in 1873 to replace a 13th-century bridge at the same location	
Howe Wath Bridge	Ainthorpe	Road	54.4653°N 0.9271°W		N/A		
Ainthorpe Bridge	Ainthorpe	Road	54.4651°N 0.9091°W	Early 19th century	N/A		
Railway bridge	Danby	Railway	54.4634°N 0.8984°W	2012	N/A	Railway was opened in October 1865, but the bridge replaced in 2012 by Network Rail	
Railway bridge	Danby	Railway	54.4608°N 0.8910°W	2012	N/A	Railway was opened in October 1865, but the bridge replaced in 2012 by Network Rail	
Duck Bridge	Danby	Packhorse	54.4599°N 0.8915°W	See notes	II*	Unknown – largely rebuilt in 1717 by George Duck. Pevsner suggests a date of c. 1386 due to the coat of arms present on the bridge. Previous to its renovation by Duck, it was known as Danby Castle Bridge.	
Shackleton Bridge	Houlsyke	Road	54.4564°N 0.8689°W	c. 1950	N/A	Shackleton Bridge used to be on a north–south alignment; bridge and road were remodelled in the early 1950s, compare mapping from 1947 and 1951 in citations at NZ735074.	
Lealholm Bridge	Lealholm	Road	54.4581°N 0.8250°W	Early 19th century	II	Historic England state the bridge was built at the turn of the 19th century; Pevsner states possibly 1755. A bridge at Lealholm was first mentioned in 1630.	
Railway viaduct (Bridge 72)	Rake House (Glaisdale)	Rail	54.4497°N 0.8032°W	1865		Three-arch railway viaduct carrying the Esk Valley Line	
Bridge 76	Thorneywaite	Rail	54.4456°N 0.8014°W	2012	N/A	Railway was opened in October 1865, but the bridge replaced in 2012 by Network Rail	
Carr End Bridge (Bridge 80)	Glaisdale	Rail	54.4403°N 0.7956°W	2012	N/A	Railway was opened in October 1865, but the bridge replaced in 2012 by Network Rail	
Limber Hill Road	Glaisdale	Road	54.4388°N 0.7921°W	c. 1951–1954	N/A	Mapping from 1951 shows road still using Beggar's Bridge to the immediate south (see below) and the ford still in use. By 1954, a new bridge had been built over the area of the ford.	
Beggar's Bridge	Glaisdale	Foot	54.4386°N 0.7921°W	1619	II*	Built by Thomas Ferris so that people living either side of the river could cross.	
Limber Hill (Bridge 81)	Glaisdale	Rail	54.4403°N 0.7956°W	1865 (partially reconstructed in 2012	N/A		
Limber Hill wood (Bridge 82)	Glaisdale	Rail	54.4347°N 0.7862°W	1932	N/A	Girder bridge carrying the railway line; original stone bridge was built in 1865, washed away in the flood of 1930, replacement metal single-span girder bridge opened in May 1931, but that too was swept away in a flood of September 1931. Double girder bridge opened in December 1932	
Delves (Bridge 83)	Glaisdale	Rail	54.4337°N 0.7811°W	1865	N/A		

== Egton to Whitby ==
Crossing	Location	Type	Co-ordinates	Date opened	Listing	Notes	Ref
Egton Bridge	Egton Bridge	Road	54.4614°N 0.6641°W	c. 1930	N/A	Metal bridge replacing a stone bridge washed away in the floods of 1930.	
Railway viaduct (Beckside Farm Bridge 90)	Egton Bridge	Rail	54.4614°N 0.6641°W	1865	N/A	Stone arch viaduct	
Footbridge	Grosmont	Foot	54.4378°N 0.7316°W	Unknown	N/A		
Grosmont Bridge	Grosmont	Road	54.4376°N 0.7307°W	Late 17th/early 18th century	II	A three-arched road bridge, with the centre span being slightly higher than the adjoining two either side.	
Tramway bridge	Grosmont	Tramway	54.4389°N 0.7259°W	Unknown	N/A	The bridge carried a tramway associated with the iron-workings in the area.	
Bridge 44 (Note: Bridges numbers change as the ELR also changes with original formation of the Whitby & Pickering Railway between Grosmont and Whitby.)	Grosmont	Rail	54.4400°N 0.7229°W	Unknown	N/A	Railway bridge	
Bridge 45	Grosmont	Rail	54.4426°N 0.7152°W	Unknown	N/A	Railway bridge	
Bridge 46	Grosmont	Rail	54.4430°N 0.7089°W	Unknown	N/A	Railway bridge	
Bridge 47	Eskdaleside cum Ugglebarnby	Rail	54.4472°N 0.6985°W	Unknown	N/A	Railway bridge	
Bridge 48	Eskdaleside cum Ugglebarnby	Rail	54.4481°N 0.6949°W	Unknown	N/A	Railway bridge	
Bridge 50	Eskdaleside cum Ugglebarnby	Rail	54.4515°N 0.6822°W	Unknown	N/A	Railway bridge	
Bridge 51	Eskdaleside cum Ugglebarnby	Rail	54.4549°N 0.6743°W	Unknown	N/A	Railway bridge	
Bridge 52	Eskdaleside cum Ugglebarnby	Rail	54.4569°N 0.6705°W	Unknown	N/A	Railway bridge	
Sleights road bridge	Sleights	Road	54.4614°N 0.6641°W	1937		Replaced three-arch stone bridge that was washed away in the flood of 1930. Carries the A169 road.	
Sleights footbridge	Sleights	Foot	54.4614°N 0.6618°W	unknown	N/A	This bridge is undated, however a ford and a bridge were here in 1230, when the village of Briggswath was named, meaning bridge-ford.	
Ruswarp viaduct	Ruswarp	Rail	54.4693°N 0.6287°W	Unknown	N/A	Mapping from the 1850s shows the span as being a wooden viaduct, however, the current bridge has cast iron supports.	
Ruswarp bridge	Ruswarp	Road	54.4693°N 0.6277°W	1937	N/A	Steelwork and other engineering carried out by Dorman Long. It replaced an earlier bridge at this location which had been lost to flooding.	
Larpool Viaduct (Esk Viaduct)	Whitby	Rail	54.4746°N 0.6186°W	1885	II*	Opened as part of the Scarborough and Whitby Railway, 125 feet (38 m) above the water	
Whitby New Bridge	Whitby	Road	54.4788°N 0.6139°W	1980	N/A	Carries the A171 across the River Esk. Construction on the bridge started in 1978, with the concrete deck being pushed into place in September 1979. It was opened on 20 March 1980 by the Marquis of Normanby.	
Whitby Swing Bridge	Whitby	Road	54.4871°N 0.6131°W	1909	N/A	Swing bridge near the mouth of the River Esk in Whitby town.	

== Other crossings and abandoned bridges ==
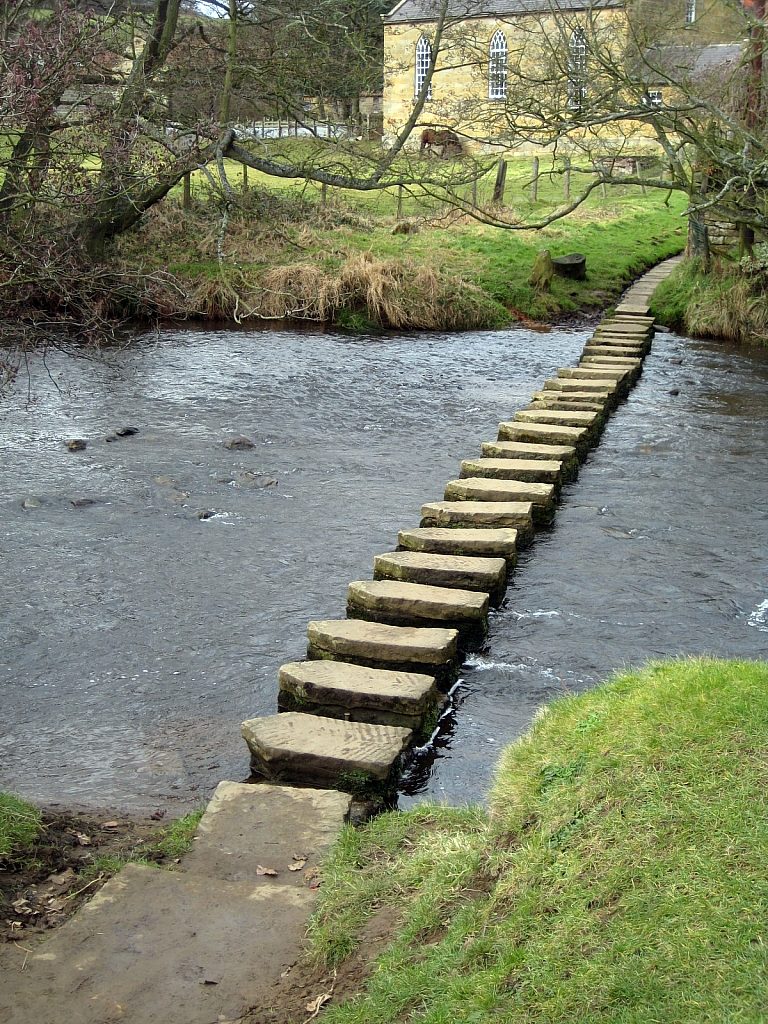
Stepping stones, Lealholm

- Bow Bridge, was of a similar design to Hunter's Sty and Beggar's Bridge, but was destroyed in 1873 when the newer Bow Bridge was built.
- Dick Bridge; 1856 map shows a wooden bridge where Shackleton Bridge is now.
- Stepping stones at Walker's Wath.
- Ford at Lealholm, upstream of the road bridge. The site now also has stepping stones.
- Ford and footbridge at Rake Bridge; the ford used to be part of a track between Whitby and York via Glaisdale. Ford has been used well into the 21st century; a flood swept a car away from Rake's Bridge Ford in 2023.
- A bridge would have taken the Cleveland Extension Mineral Railway across the River Esk just to the east of the ford, footbridge and railway bridge at Rake House, but this was never built. The cuttings on approach to either side were dug out, but the scheme failed before major engineering works were undertaken.
- A ford is located at Rake Wath (NZ780065).
- A wooden trestle bridge (at NZ777055) used to carry a tramway for the ironworks at Glaisdale.
- A ford at Glaisdale, to the north of Beggar's Bridge (at NZ784055), was used before the bridge was built.
- A set of stepping stones are located east of Egton Bridge, (at NZ806050).
- Mapping from 1880, shows Stang Bridge a wooden bridge at NZ814049. Modern mapping shows a smaller bridge, slightly westwards at the point of an old ford.
- The ford at Sleights (by the footbridge at the railway station) was granted to Whitby Abbey in the early 13th century. The original road bridge at Sleights which was accessed by a level crossing at the west end of the station was washed away in the flood of 1930. It was replaced by a high-level bridge to the west which spans both the railway and the river, 160 yards (150 m) upstream.
- Between 1825 and 1828, a suspension bridge was built to the west of Ruswarp; this acted as a main crossing in the area, before a road bridge was built later by the railway station. Flooding brought down the suspension bridge.
- The original Whitby & Pickering Railway viaduct at Ruswarp was made from Baltic pine (imported through the Port of Whitby), and carried two tracks diagonally over the river for 312 feet (95 m).
- An "iron road bridge" was built by the railway station at Ruswarp in 1873. It was lost in the flooding of 1930.
- A ford existed at Ruswarp where the road bridge is now.
- A small packhorse bridge (at NZ092894) is thought to be evidence of a ford across the river from Ruswarp to Larpool Lane. The river was altered to take a sharp meander out of its course when the railway was built in 1836.
- A ford at Bog Hall (Whitby) could be crossed at low water. The ford was part of an old track that connected both sides of the river.
- A bridge was spanning the harbour in Whitby in 1351, and another was rebuilt in stone in 1746, where the current 1909 swing bridge is.
