= Esk Valley Walk =

Long distance footpath in North Yorkshire, England

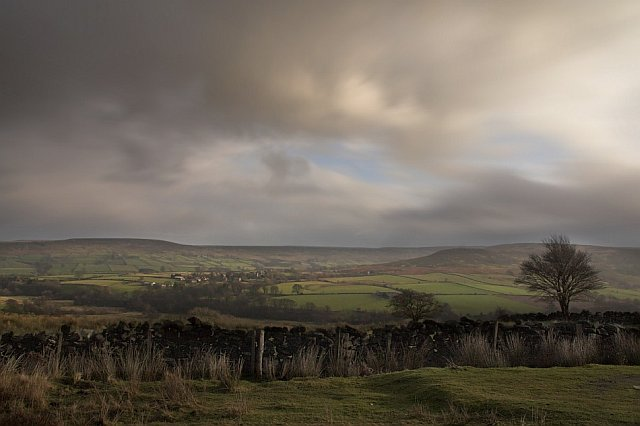
- Westerdale lies on the trail
- Length: 35 mi (56 km)
- Location: Northern England, United Kingdom
- Designation: Regional Route maintained by North York Moors National Park Authority
- Trailheads: Castleton North Yorkshire; 54.465°N 0.940°W; Whitby, North Yorkshire; 54.486°N 0.610°W
- Use: Hiking
- Elevation change: 400m
- Highest point: 415m
- Lowest point: 15m
- Difficulty: Challenging
- Waymark: Leaping salmon and name on white disc
- Hazards: Moorland

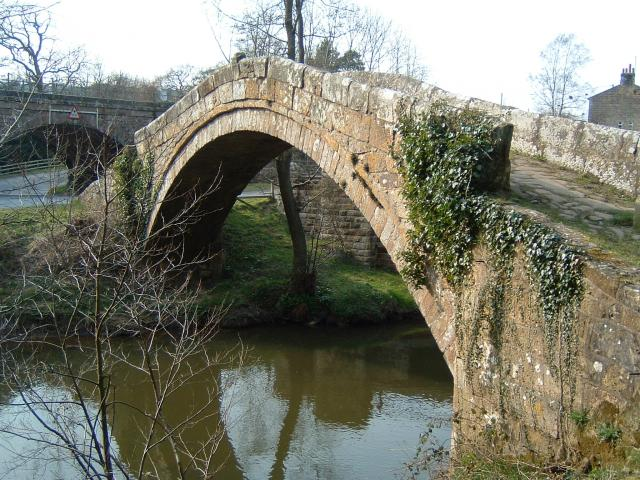
Beggar's Bridge at Glaisdale

The Esk Valley Walk is a long distance footpath in North Yorkshire, England. The route first follows a loop on the North York Moors to the south of Castleton, then shadows the River Esk on its journey to the North Sea. Waymarking uses the symbol of a leaping salmon, with yellow arrows denoting footpaths and blue arrows bridleways.

== Route ==
There are four stages to the route beginning with a loop walk over moorland around Castleton.

=== Castleton Loop ===
The route starts near Castleton Moor railway station turning right to cross the River Esk to the outskirts of Castleton before turning left through a farm and over moorland to the junction of Conforths Lane and Burtree Lane. It follows the latter to its end and across more farmland to pick up Blackrivers Lane. Crossing more farmland the route then heads uphill and crosses the path of both the Lyke Wake Walk and the Richmond to Robins Hood Bay section of the Coast to Coast Walk.

At the junction of Blakey Ridge and Blakey Bank the route turns onto the former Farndale Railway following the contours until signposted on the right to ascend to the peak of the walk at the headwater of the River Esk. The route follows the river back into Castleton to the starting point.

=== Castleton to Lealholm ===
From the starting point for the Castleton loop it turns right towards the Park End woods of Danby Park, sharing the route with the Three Ridings route before diverging and continuing to Danby and past the Methodist church. From here it turns south across the river by the Esk Mill to the outskirts of Ainthorpe and then eastwards along Easton Lane. A left turn across fields, over the Esk Valley line and a footbridge over the river brings the route to the car park for the Danby Lodge National Park Centre. After a short trek across fields, the route turns sharply north towards open moorland before resuming an easterly path. A signpost on the right directs southwards and leads through the hamlet of Lealholmside before entering Lealholm itself.

=== Lealholm to Grosmont ===
From the Lealholm War Memorial the route follows farm tracks next to the river. Just before the river turns south, the route crosses the river by either a footbridge or ford. The walk then follows Rake Lane before turning off at Thorneywaite House and going through woodland before emerging on the eastern end of Glaisdale where it again joins up with the Coast to Coast Path. At Glaisdale Station it turns south along a drovers road through woodland as follows the curve of the river to Egton Bridge where it crosses the river yet again. Following the route along Barnards Road, the walk diverges from the Coast to Coast Walk just before reaching the village of Grosmont.

=== Grosmont to Whitby ===
From Grosmont the route follows the north bank of the river, crossing the A169 road, to the outskirts of the village of Briggswath before crossing the river into Sleights. It then follows the south bank of the river to Ruswarp where it recrosses the river. A short distance along the B1416 is the right turn that takes the path into the outskirts of Whitby near Caedmon School. The route wends its way along the riverfront, crossing the path of the Cleveland Way to the harbour to end on the West Pier.

== Gallery ==
Along the Esk Valley Walk
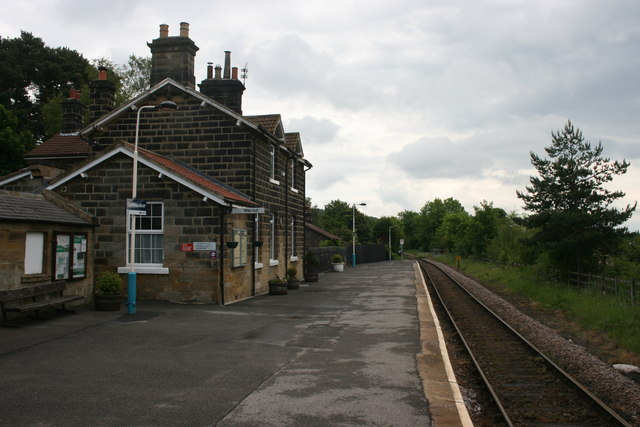
Castleton Moor railway station - start of the walk

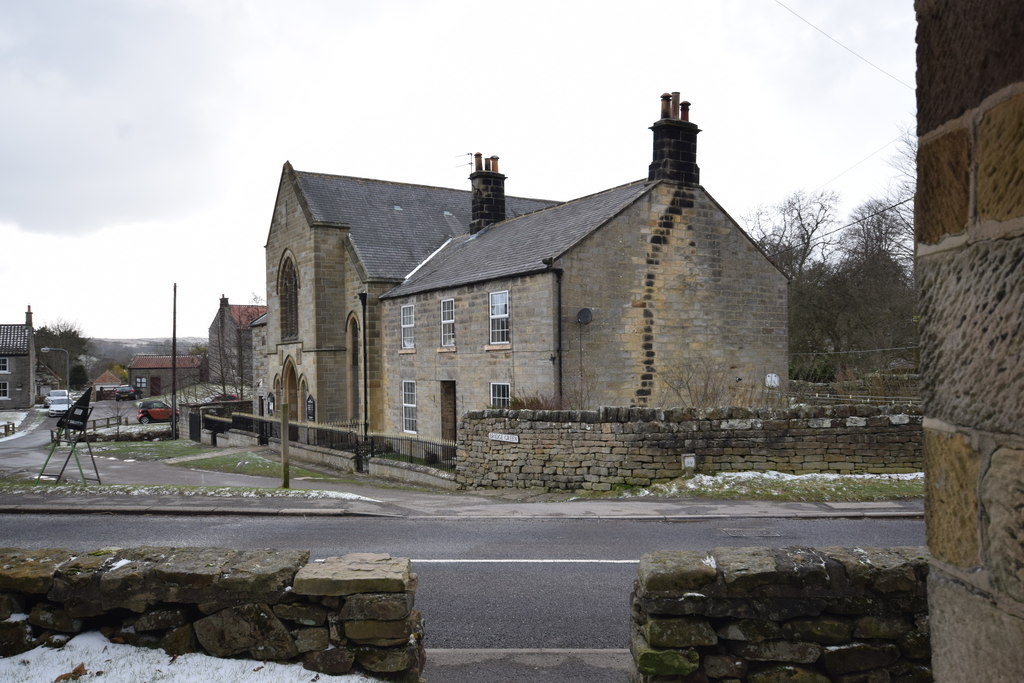
Danby Methodist Church on the route

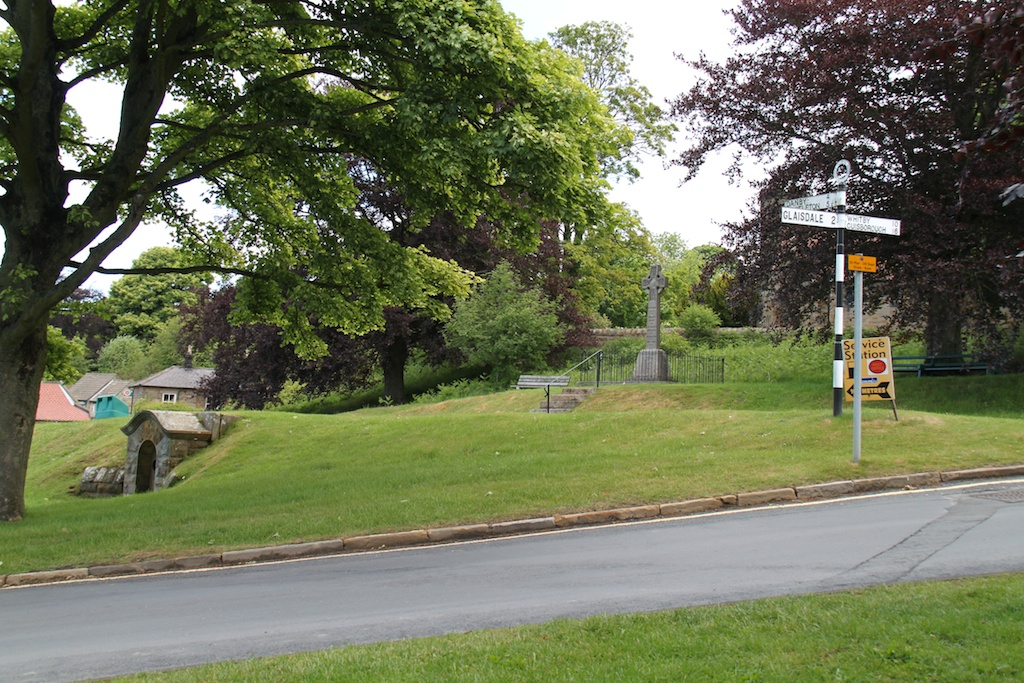
Lealholm War memorial by the route of walk

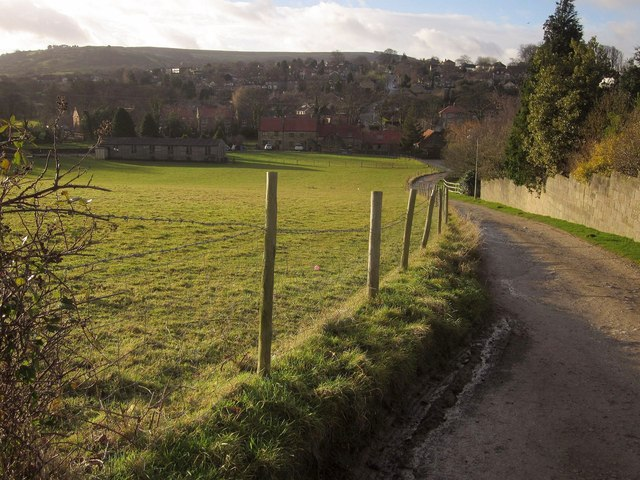
Approaching Sleights

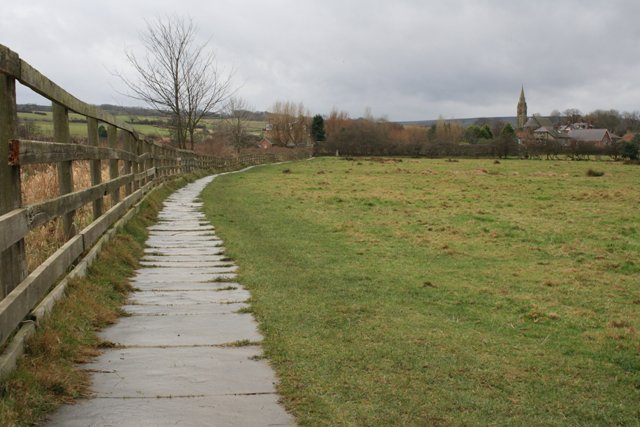
Esk Valley Walk at Ruswarp

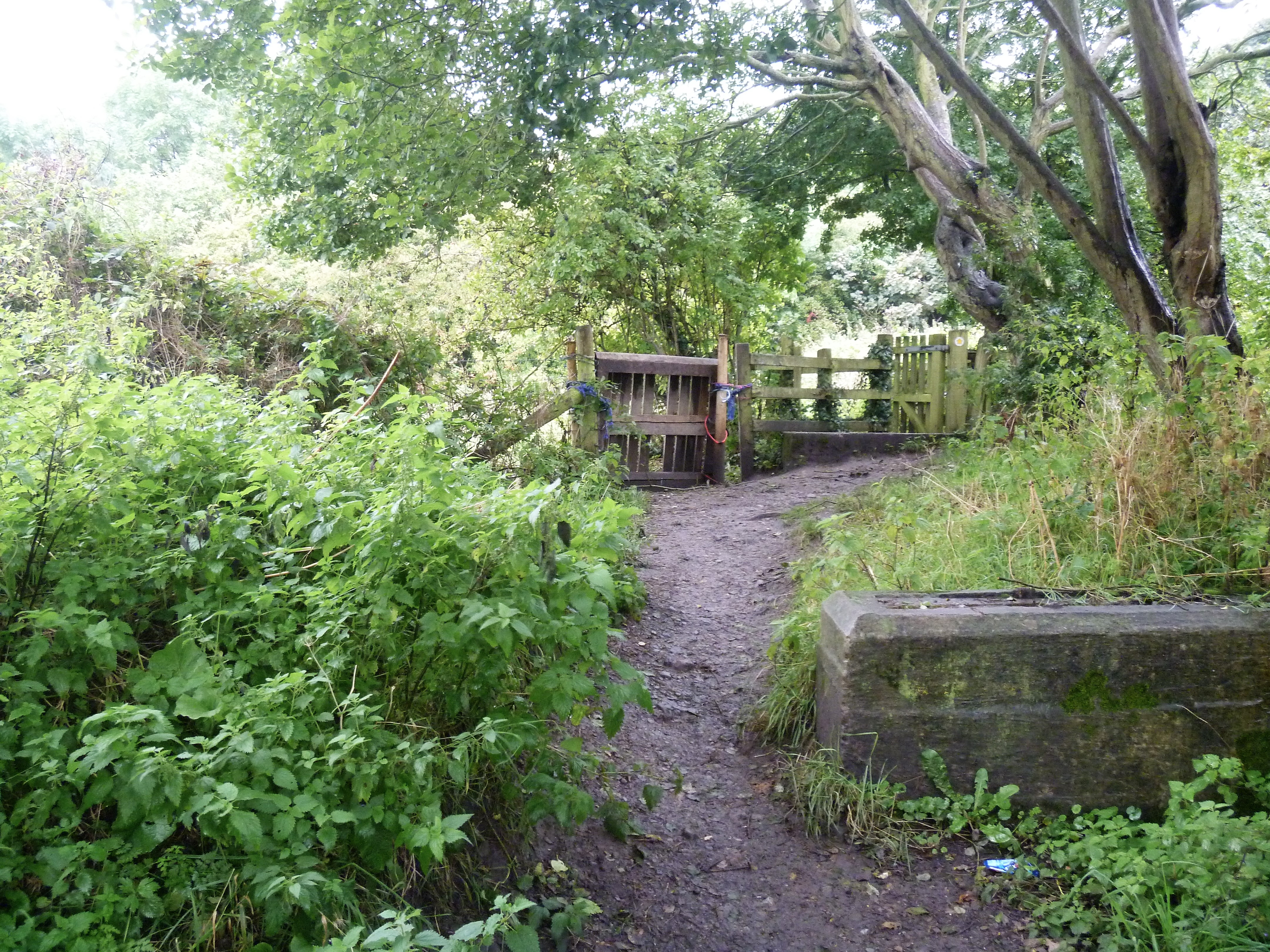
At the outskirts of Whitby near Caedmon School

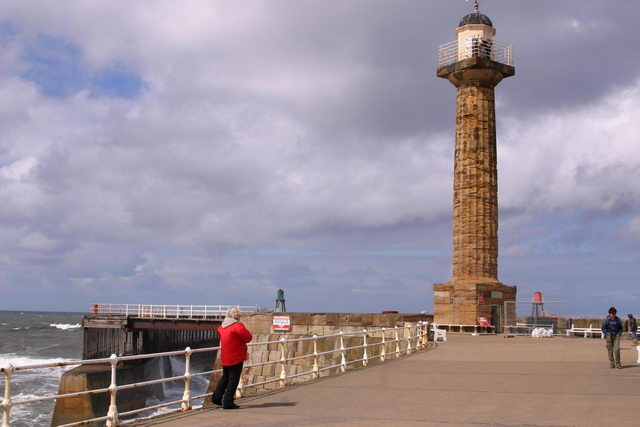
Whitby West Pier at end of Esk Valley Walk
