= Street Farmhouse =

Farmhouse in Glaisdale, North Yorkshire, England

Coordinates: 54.4326°N 0.8696°W

Street Farmhouse is a historic building in Glaisdale, a valley in North Yorkshire, in England.

The farmhouse was built in 1749, and is described by the Royal Commission on the Historical Monuments of England as "perhaps the earliest freestanding centralised plan yeoman farmhouse in the region". It originally had mullioned windows, a late example of the technique, although many were replaced by sash windows in the 19th century. The building was grade II* listed in 1969, along with its outbuildings.

The farmhouse is built of sandstone on a plinth, with quoins, a floor band, a coved cornice, and a purple slate roof with stone copings and kneelers. It has two storeys and is three bays wide. The central doorway has a chamfered surround, alternating -block jambs, and a keystone flanked by incised scrolls. Above it is a round-headed window with a fluted keystone and moulded imposts. Elsewhere, some three-light chamfered and mullioned windows survive. To the left is a two-storey outhouse, and beyond is a lower stable with two doors. Inside, there is a wide central passageway through the whole depth of the building, containing an early staircase. Many original moulded beams and joists are visible on the ground floor, while in the ground floor left-hand room, there is a stone fire hood with columns.

== See also ==
- Grade II* listed buildings in North Yorkshire (district)
- Listed buildings in Glaisdale
