= St James' Church, Lealholm =

Church in Glaisdale, North Yorkshire, England

Coordinates: 54°27′32″N 0°49′27″W

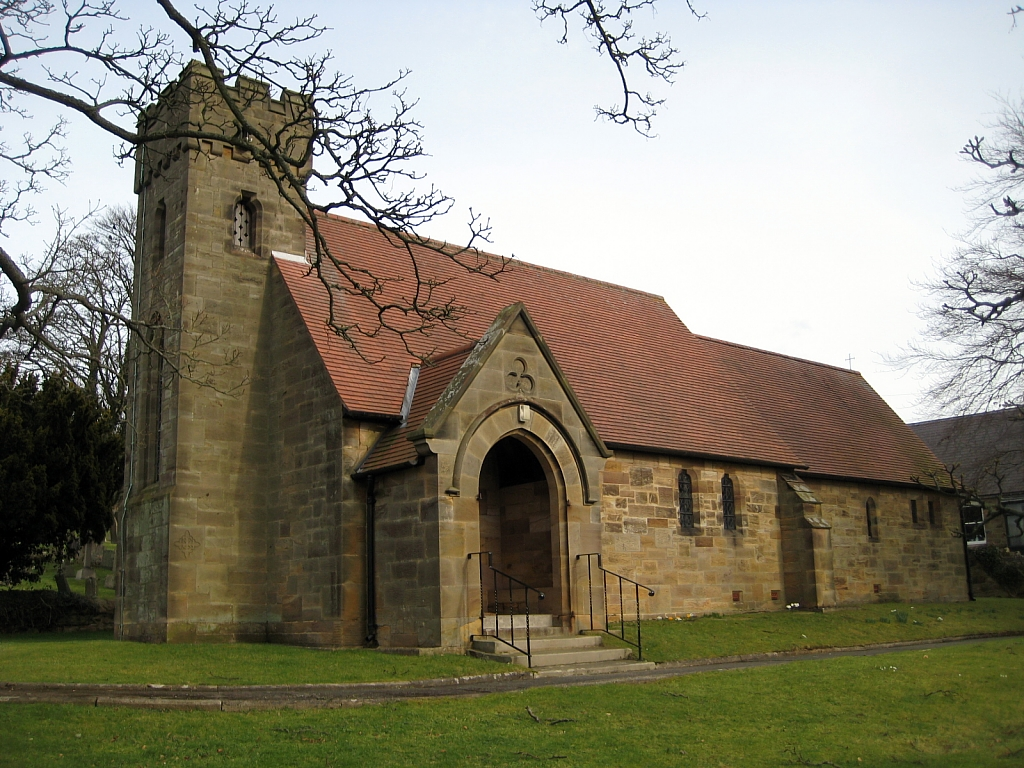
The church, in 2012

St James' Church is an Anglican church in Lealholm, a village in North Yorkshire, in England.

The church was built in 1902, as a chapel of ease to St Thomas' Church, Glaisdale. The building was designed by Temple Moore, in the Early English style. Nikolaus Pevsner describes it as "a job to do him credit", and it was grade II* listed in 1969.

The church is built of sandstone with a clay tile roof. It consists of a three-bay nave, a south porch, a three-bay chancel with a small north vestry, and a slim west tower. The tower has a single stage, a chamfered plinth, a west lancet window with a double-chamfered surround, shouldered-arched bell openings, and a corbelled-out embattled parapet. The windows in the body of the church have pointed heads and shouldered lintels, and the east window has three stepped lancets. Inside, there is exposed stonework and a barrel-shaped roof. There are pine benches and an oak pulpit, lectern and choir seats. The chancel has a mosaic floor, and the reredos is of carved marble.

== See also ==
- Grade II* listed churches in North Yorkshire (district)
- Listed buildings in Glaisdale
