= Glaisdale Head Methodist Church =

Church in England

Coordinates: 54°25′46″N 0°50′00″W

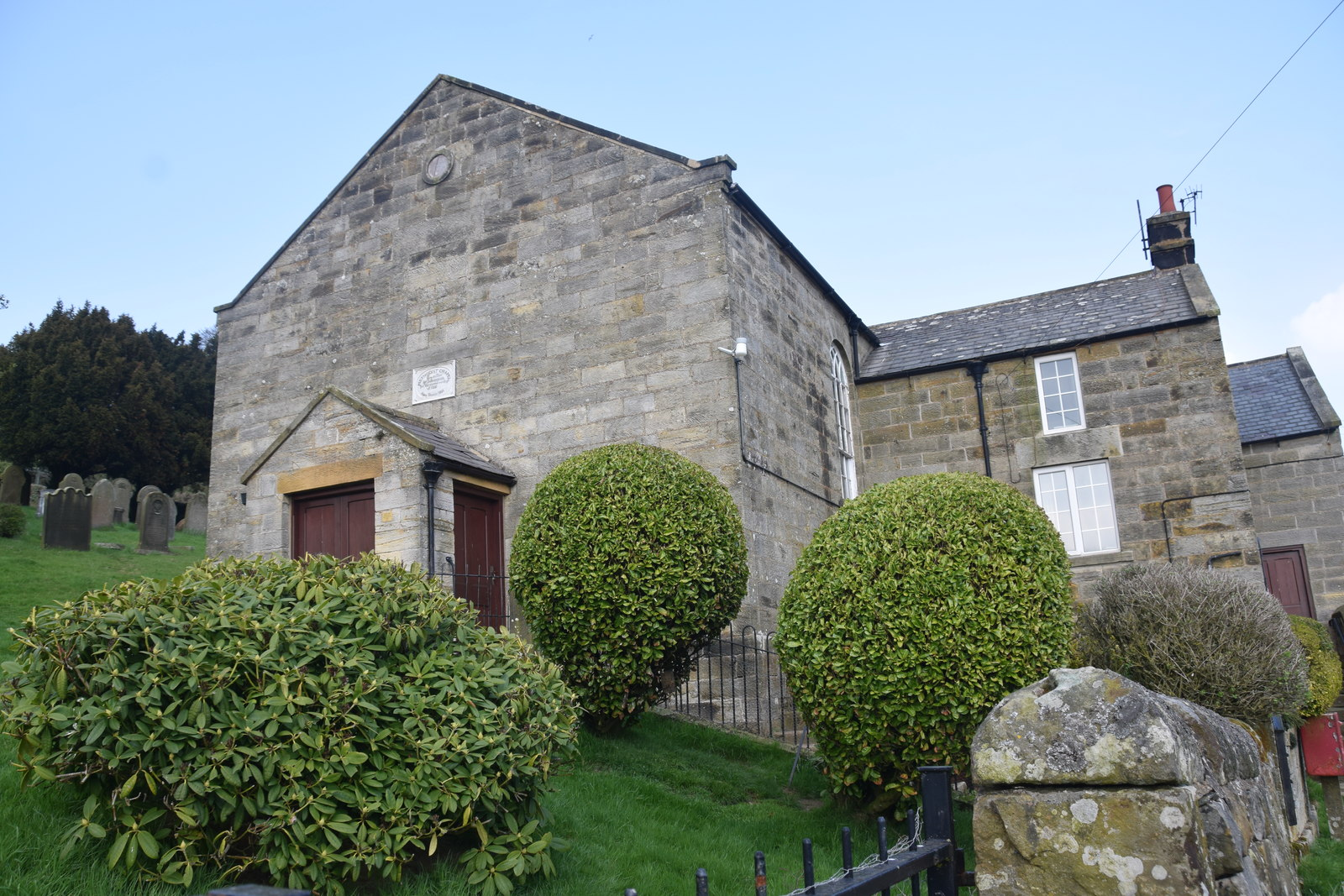
The chapel, in 2018

Glaisdale Head Methodist Church is a historic chapel in Glaisdale, a valley in North Yorkshire, in England.

The chapel was built by the Wesleyan Methodist Church in 1821, along with an attached manse. The manse was extended in 1850. By the early 20th century, it was one of four Wesleyan chapels in the small valley. The building was grade II listed in 1969, along with the walls surrounding the churchyard. It is on the Heritage at Risk Register, due to damp caused by being built partly into the ground, but is still in use as a Methodist chapel.

The original part of the building has a Westmorland slate roof, and the extension has a purple slate roof. The chapel has one tall storey, and a square plan with fronts of two bays. The windows are round-headed sashes with voussoirs, and on the west front is a gabled porch with an inscribed and dated oval plaque. The manse has two storeys and a basement, one gabled bay facing the road, and steps leading up to the doorway. The extension on the east side is approached by steps in the angle, and the windows are sashes. In front is a wall with heavy flat coping, and at the left are steps up to the chapel, with a large square dated pier with a domed square cap at the bottom . From this, railings with curved heads run alongside the steps. The interior is plain, with a pulpit and curved benches.

== See also ==
- Listed buildings in Glaisdale
