= Quarry Cottage =

Cottage in Glaisdale, North Yorkshire, England

Coordinates: 54.4323°N 0.8154°W

Quarry Cottage is a historic building in Glaisdale, a valley in North Yorkshire, in England.

The building was originally a longhouse named Quarry Farm, probably built in the early 17th century. Originally there was only an attic over the forehouse, but in the 19th century, an attic storey was provided throughout. At some point, most of the byre was demolished, and most of the roof timbers have been replaced, but the building is generally well-preserved. It is also noted for its witch post in its original position. The farmhouse was grade II* listed in 1969.

The farmhouse is built of sandstone on a plinth, with a pantile roof and stone copings. It has one storey and an attic, three bays, and a passage bay. On the front are chamfered mullioned windows, and a small larder window. At the rear is a wide buttress and an inserted casement window, and in the roof is a modern dormer and flanking skylights. Inside are some early doors, and the original firebeam and hood with a fireplace from about 1700.

== See also ==
- Grade II* listed buildings in North Yorkshire (district)
- Listed buildings in Glaisdale
