= John Castillo (poet) =

John Castillo (1792 – 16 April 1845), often referred to as the "Bard of the Dales", from his first published book - "The Bard of the Dales - Poems by John Castillo" was a poet who lived for much of his life in the village of Lealholm. Castillo's work is treasured as having rescued the ancient language of the dales from oblivion.

John's father, a traveller, met his spouse in Eskdale and they both returned to Ireland where John was born in 1792 near the small village of Rathfarnham, close to Dublin, today a suburb of the city. At the age of two, the family decided to return to Lealholm and moved to the site that now bears the name Poets' Cottage. At the age of 12 he moved to Lincolnshire and began work as a servant on a country estate and soon became note for his talent as a poet, singer / songwriter.

Later returning to Eskdale, he began work as a farm hand, and soon turned his skills to stonemasonry. Methodism was popular across the Dales, and John converted from Catholicism in 1818. Following thoughts of suicide he became a lay preacher, but continued his stone work and poetry. He often wrote using local dialect and is most well known for the poems "Aud Isaac" and "The Steeplechase" although he also used standard English. Very few of his works have been published since the early 1900s.

He died in the town of Pickering aged 53, and is buried at the Methodist Chapel in Hungate. His gravestone reads an epitaph of his own creation

SACRED
TO THE MEMORY
OF
JOHN CASTILO

Author of
Auld Isaac, The Steeplechase ,
and other Poems
In the Yorkshire Dialect.

HE LIVED FOR OTHERS

He was an original and successful local preacher
among the Wesleyan Methodists for many years.

"Bud noo his eean's geean dim i' deeath
Nee mare a pilgrim here on earch;
His soul flits fra' her shell beneeath
Tee reealms o' day
Whoor carpin' care an' pain, an' deeath
Are deean away."
