= Hart Hall, Glaisdale =

House in Glaisdale, North Yorkshire, England

Coordinates: 54°26′04″N 0°48′28″W

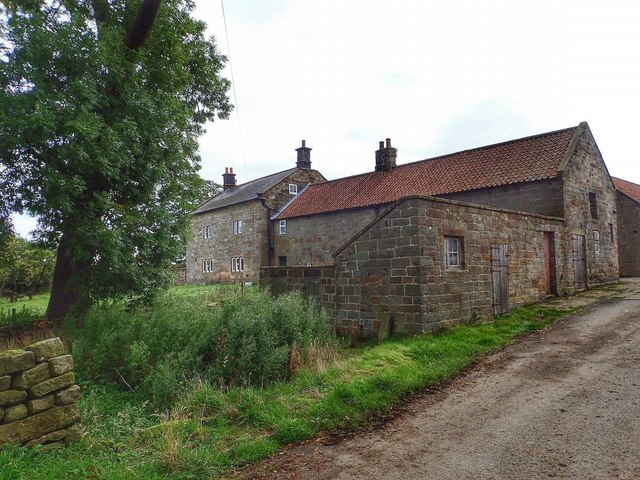
The building, in 2015

Hart Hall is a historic building in Glaisdale, a valley in North Yorkshire, in England.

The building was constructed as a longhouse in 1684. In 1768, the lower end was rebuilt to provide kitchen facilities, while the upper end was rebuilt in 1797. Probably in the early 19th century, the lower part of the building was raised from one-and-a-half to two stories. The farmhouse was grade II* listed in 1987.

A legend holds that the building was formerly haunted by a hob, which assist with work in the fields. The farmhands left it a gift, which unexpectedly caused it to leave.

The building is constructed of sandstone, the older part with a pantile roof, and the later part with a roof of green slate with stone ridges, gable copings and kneelers. It has two storeys, the main house with three bays. This has a central blocked doorway with quoined jambs, and a lintel with false voussoirs and a dated keystone. Most of the windows are horizontally-sliding sashes. The downhouse has two storeys, three irregular bays, and an outhouse on the left. It contains a doorway with alternate-block jambs and a dated lintel, a stable door with a re-set keystone, and sash windows. Inside, there is a cross passage, one wall of which is original. There is much early woodwork, including panelling, cupboards, and a chimneypiece in the parlour.

== See also ==
- Grade II* listed buildings in North Yorkshire (district)
- Listed buildings in Glaisdale
