= Lealholm Methodist Chapel =

Chapel in Lealholm, North Yorkshire, England

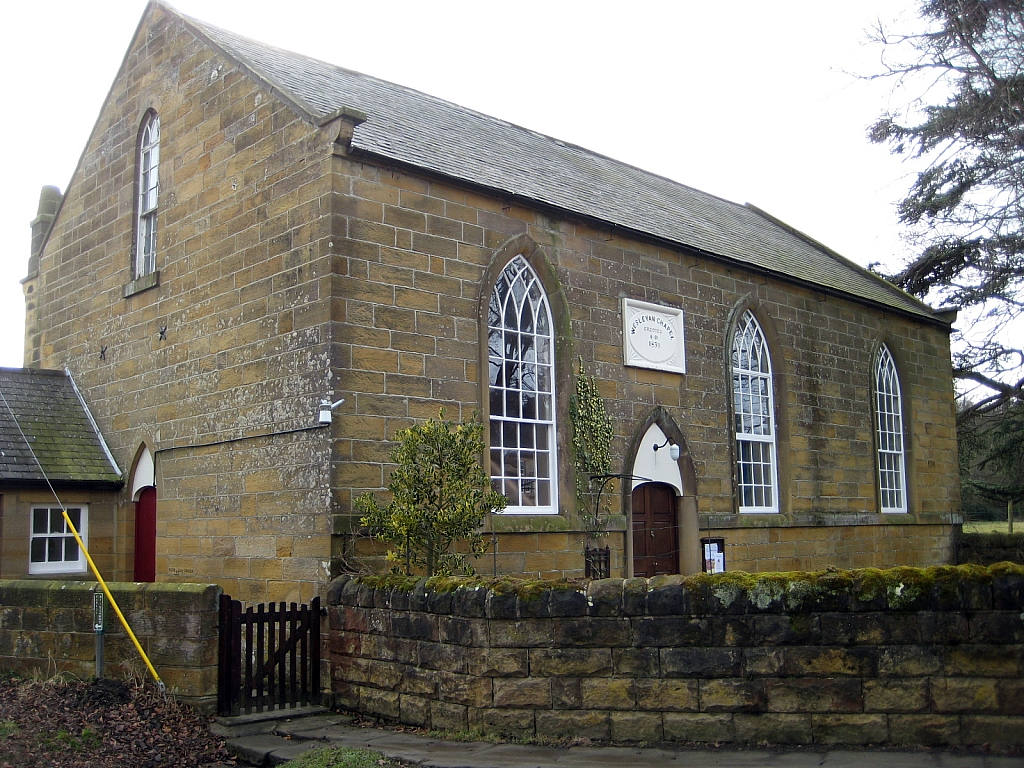
- The chapel in 2012
- Lealholm Methodist Chapel
- 54.45789°N 0.82744°W
- OS grid reference: NZ 76116 07575
- Location: Lealholm, North Yorkshire
- Country: England
- Denomination: Methodist

History
- Status: Chapel

Architecture
- Functional status: Active
- Style: Gothic Revival

Specifications
- Materials: Sandstone, slate roof

Lealholm Methodist Chapel is a historic Methodist place of worship in Lealholm, a village in North Yorkshire, in England.

The chapel was built in 1839 for the Wesleyan Methodist Church. By the early 20th century, it was one of four Wesleyan chapels in the small valley. The chapel has been flooded on numerous occasions, and the heights of various floods are marked by cuts on the external stonework. The chapel was grade II* listed in 1969.

The chapel is built of sandstone, with a sill band, and a purple slate roof with a stone ridge, copings and curved kneelers. There is one tall storey, three bays, and a small single-storey extension to the southeast. The doorway has a pointed-arched head and a hooded fanlight. The windows are sashes, also with pointed-arched heads. Above the doorway is a square panel with fan-patterned spandrels and a dated and inscribed oval plaque.

== See also ==
- Grade II* listed churches in North Yorkshire (district)
- Listed buildings in Glaisdale
