= Our Lady of the Sacred Heart Church, Lealholm =

Church in Lealholm, North Yorkshire, England

Coordinates: 54°27′33″N 0°49′23″W

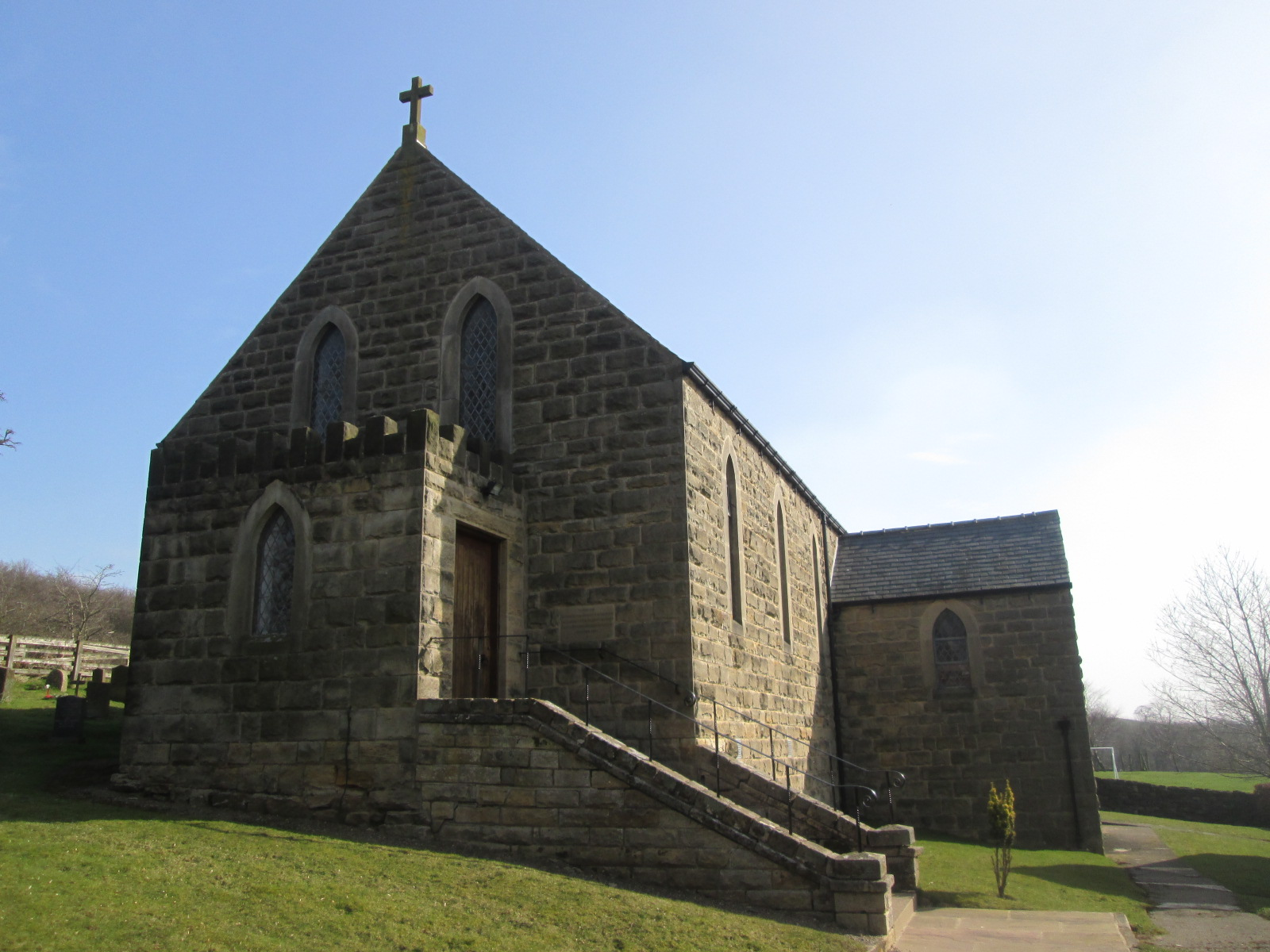
The church, in 2017

Our Lady of the Sacred Heart is a Catholic church in Lealholm, a village in North Yorkshire, in England.

In the early 20th century, Lealholm was in the parish of St Hedda's Church, Egton Bridge. A church was built in the village in 1932, to a Gothic revival design by the local architect W. R. Robinson. In 1948, it was given its own parish. Nikolaus Pevsner was critical of the building, describing it as "not a job to do any architect credit".

The church is built of stone, with a Welsh slate roof. It consists of a nave and sanctuary, with a gabled sacristry to the south. The church is on a steep north-south slope. The windows are lancets, and there is a cross atop the west gable. There is a simple interior with a king post roof, a pine altar and pulpit, stained glass figures in the windows, and wooden stations of the cross recessed in the walls.
