= Listed buildings in Glaisdale =

Glaisdale is a civil parish in the county of North Yorkshire, England. It contains 47 listed buildings that are recorded in the National Heritage List for England. Of these, six are listed at Grade II*, the middle of the three grades, and the others are at Grade II, the lowest grade. The parish contains the villages of Glaisdale and Lealholm, the smaller settlement of Houlsyke, and the surrounding countryside and moorland. Most of the listed buildings consist of houses, cottages and associated structures, farmhouses and farm buildings. The others include churches and chapels, a wayside cross, bridges, a boundary stone, a drinking fountain, and two war memorials.

== Key ==
Grade	Criteria
II*	Particularly important buildings of more than special interest
II	Buildings of national importance and special interest

== Buildings ==
Name and location	Photograph	Date	Notes	Grade
Stump Cross; 54.47479°N 0.83914°W		Medieval (probable)	The former wayside stone in gritstone. It consists of a square plinth on which is a square socket stone, and in the socket is a possible fragment of a cross shaft. Lying by the plinth are two possible cross fragments.	II
Beggar's Bridge; 54.43866°N 0.79214°W		1619	The bridge crossing the River Esk is in sandstone, and consists of a single segmental arch with voussoirs and an arch ring. It has a peaked parapet with chamfered coping, and the roadway is paved. On the bridge are a coat of arms, initials and the date.	II*
Quarry Cottage; 54.43232°N 0.81537°W	—	Early 17th century (probable)	A farmhouse in sandstone on a plinth, with a pantile roof and stone copings. There is one storey and an attic, three bays, and a passage bay. On the front are chamfered mullioned windows, and a small larder window. At the rear is a wide buttress and an inserted casement window, and in the roof is a modern dormer and flanking skylights.	II*
Outbuilding east of York House; 54.42317°N 0.84886°W	—	Early 17th century (probable)	The outbuilding is in sandstone on a massive plinth, and has a roof in galvanised steel. There is one storey, an attic over the south end, and four bays. It contains various doorway and windows, including a three-light chamfered mullioned window in the right return. Inside, there are three pairs of crucks.	II
Hart Hall; 54.43439°N 0.80770°W		17th century	A farmhouse that has been altered and extended, it is in sandstone, the older part with a pantile roof, and the later part with a roof of green slate with stone ridges, gable copings and kneelers. There are two storeys, the main house with three bays. This has a central blocked doorway with quoined jambs, and a lintel with false voussoirs and a dated keystone. Most of the windows are horizontally-sliding sashes. The downhouse has two storeys, three irregular bays, and an outhouse on the left. It contains a doorway with alternate-block jambs and a dated lintel, a stable door with a re-set keystone, and sash windows.	II*
Outbuilding west of York House; 54.42336°N 0.85004°W	—	Mid 17th century	A farmhouse with a byre, later a lambing shed, it is in sandstone, and has a pantile roof with stone copings. There is one storey and a loft, and four bays. It contains two stable doors with quoined surrounds, loft doors, slit vents and blocked openings.	II
York House and outbuilding 54.42327°N 0.84969°W	—	17th century	The house, which was partly rebuilt in 1780, and the attached outbuilding, are in sandstone, the downhouse has a pantile roof, the roof of the main house is in concrete tiles, and the roofs have stone copings and kneelers. The main house has two storeys and two bays, to the left is a wide kitchen bay incorporating a passage, further to the left is the two-bay outbuilding, and there are rear extensions. The passage door has a lintel with a keystone, and the windows are sashes with raised surrounds. To the left are further doorways and a pitching door.	II
Houlsyke House; 54.46168°N 0.86298°W	—	Late 17th century (probable)	The farmhouse, which has been altered, is in sandstone, and has a French tile roof, with a tile ridge, and stone coping and kneelers. There are two storeys, three wide bays, and a single-storey bay on the right. The windows are a mix of sashes and casements, and in the left return are windows with chamfered surrounds.	II
Midge Hall and outbuilding 54.40900°N 0.85559°W	—	Late 17th century	The farmhouse and attached byre and barn are in sandstone, and have pantile roofs with stone copings and curved kneelers. The house has two storeys and two bays, and a later wide bay extension on the left, and the barn to the right has five bays. On the front is a blocked doorway with a dated and initialled lintel. In the extension are a casement window and two sash windows, all with stepped wedge lintels and keystones. The main house has sash windows, some horizontally-sliding, with heavy lintels, and at the rear are three raking dormers. The barn contains windows, doors, and slit vents.	II
Red House; 54.43419°N 0.81256°W	—	Late 17th century (probable)	A farmhouse that was partly rebuilt in 1748, it is in sandstone, and has a pantile roof with a stone ridge, copings and kneelers. The main part has two storeys and three bays and a chamfered plinth. The doorway has a heavy lintel and a dated and initialled keystone, and above it is a sundial in a moulded panel. The windows are sashes, with extended lintels and keystones. At the rear is a central stair window with an initialled keystone, and sash windows, one horizontally-sliding. The older part to the right is lower, with two storeys and two wide bays, and it contains a doorway with chamfered alternating-block jambs and a heavy lintel, and sash windows.	II
Boundary stone 54.46694°N 0.86657°W		1736	The boundary stone is in gritstone, with about 0.4 metres (1 ft 4 in) above the ground. There is an inscription including the date on the east face.	II
Rake Farmhouse and outbuildings 54.44881°N 0.80182°W		1749	The buildings are in stone with pantile roofs. The farmhouse has a string course, raised gables and prominent kneelers. There are two storeys, a double depth plan, a front range of three bays, and a single-storey rear extension linking to the farm buildings. The central doorway has a round-headed arch, projecting consoles, and a dated keystone. The ground floor windows are casements, above the doorway is a single-light window with a round head. In the upper floor, the outer bays contain four-light mullioned windows with round-headed lights and sashes. At the rear is a large bay window. Attached to the house is a single-storey range, and at right angles is a two-storey range with a barn door and an external staircase, and a parallel single-storey range with a ball finial on the gable.	II
Street Farmhouse and outbuildings 54.43261°N 0.86962°W	—	1749	The farmhouse is in sandstone on a plinth, with quoins, a floor band, a coved cornice, and a purple slate roof with stone copings and kneelers. There are two storeys and three bays. The central doorway has a chamfered surround, alternating -block jambs, and a keystone flanked by incised scrolls. Above it is a round-headed window with a fluted keystone and moulded imposts. Elsewhere, there are three-light chamfered and mullioned windows. To the left is a two-storey outhouse, and beyond is a lower stable with two doors.	II*
Bainley Bank Cottage; 54.42847°N 0.86372°W		Mid 18th century (probable)	A farmhouse in sandstone with a pantile roof, and a stone ridge, copings and block kneelers. The main house has two storeys and three bays, and the downhouse has one storey and an attic and two bays. The doorway has a plain lintel, and the windows are mullioned and contain casements. In the gable of the downhouse is an owl hole, and at the rear of the house is a lean-to extension.	II
Garden wall north of Hart Hall; 54.43450°N 0.80759°W	—	Mid 18th century	The wall running from the north of the house is in sandstone on a plinth, and has flat coping. At the end is a raised pier with a pyramidal cap.	II
Slidney-Beck Farmhouse; 54.42457°N 0.89032°W		Mid 18th century	A farmhouse in sandstone on a plinth, with stepped eaves and an asbestos roof. There are two storeys and four bays. The doorway has a chamfered surround, and the windows are a mix, including casements. sashes and mullioned windows. At the rear are two gabled half-dormers.	II
Brook House Farmhouse and outbuildings 54.46173°N 0.86518°W	—	Mid to late 18th century	The farmhouse is in sandstone, and has a pantile roof with stone coping and block kneelers. The main house has two storeys and two bays, and the outbuilding range to the right has one storey and an attic, and six bays. In the main house are modern windows, and in the outbuilding are three stable doors, a cart door, a window and a loft door.	II
Former antique shop, cottage and outbuilding 54.45784°N 0.82552°W	—	Late 18th century (probable)	A pair of houses, one previously a shop, in sandstone, with stepped eaves, and a pantile roof with a stone ridge, copings, and kneelers. There are two storeys and three wide bays. On the front are two doorways and sash windows. At the left is a range of single-storey outbuildings, in front of which is a mounting block.	II
Haybarn south of Hart Hall; 54.43405°N 0.80782°W	—	Late 18th century	The haybarn, which was extended in the early 19th century, is in sandstone with stepped eaves and a pantile roof. There is a single storey, with a hayloft over the earlier part. In the earlier part is an open section, and the barn contains doorways, windows and loading doors. At the northeast gable end is a pigsty with a feeding chute, and above it are two loading doors.	II
High Farmhouse; 54.43315°N 0.86834°W	—	Late 18th century	The farmhouse, which was later extended, is in sandstone, and has swept pantile roofs with stone coping and square kneelers. There are two storeys and two bays, with a lower two-storey single bay to the right and a single-storey single bay further to the right. On the front is a small fire window, and the other windows are sashes, those in the earlier part with wedge lintels.	II
Horse House Farmhouse; 54.45819°N 0.82794°W	—	Late 18th century	The farmhouse is in sandstone, and has a pantile roof with flat copings and moulded kneelers. There are two storeys and four bays. On the front are two doorways and sash windows, all with wedge lintels and large keystones.	II
Farm building east of Horse House Farmhouse and drinking fountain 54.45825°N 0.82753°W	—	Late 18th century	The barn and byre are in sandstone, and the roof is in pantile with stone copings and square kneelers. There is one storey and a loft, and four bays. It contains doorways, irregularly-placed windows and slit vents. In the west return is a stone drinking fountain dated 1904. It contains an arched niche, with voussoirs, and a dated and initialled keystone. Inside, there is an iron standpipe with the maker's mark.	II
Lawns Farmhouse (east) and outbuildings 54.46107°N 0.85434°W	—	Late 18th century (probable)	The farmhouse is in stone, and has a green slate roof with stone copings and kneelers. There are two storeys and three bays, and to the right is a single-bay extension with a roof of artificial slate. The central doorway has a blocked fanlight, and the windows are sashes with wedge lintels and keystones. To the right is a long single-storey range of stable and byres, with a short two-storey projection at the end.	II
Barn south of Red House; 54.43391°N 0.81244°W	—	Late 18th century	A threshing barn and calf house in sandstone on a plinth, with swept eaves, and a pantile roof with stone gable copings and long square-ended footstones. There are two storeys and five bays. It contains a large round-arched wagon entrance, and the other openings include stable doors, wagon doors and slit vents. Attached to the west of the barn is a small one-story two-bay byre.	II
Postgate Farmhouse and outbuildings 54.42934°N 0.83276°W		1784	The farmhouse and attached outbuildings are in sandstone, and have pantile roofs with a stone ridge, gable copings and square kneelers. There are two storeys and a total of eight bay. The main doorway is recessed, on a partial plinth, and has a lintel with a dated and initialled keystone, under a round arch with voussoirs. The windows are mixed, and include casements, sashes, some horizontally-sliding, and a small fire window. The outbuilding contains three stable doors and slit vents. At the rear is an outbuilding with a purple slate roof, and a gabled stair extension.	II
Lealholm Hall; 54.46016°N 0.81050°W	—	Late 1780s	The house, which has been largely rebuilt, is in sandstone on a plinth, and has a green concrete tile roof, and a stone ridge, coping and moulded kneelers. There are two storeys, three bays, and a single-storey two-bay right ]wing. Steps lead up to the doorway, the windows in the main part are sashes, and in the wing they are modern. The garden front contains a tall round-headed stair window with voussoirs.	II
Former Street Methodist Chapel; 54.43471°N 0.86383°W		1789	The chapel and manse, later a private house, is in sandstone, and has a roof of Lakeland and Walsh slate, with a stone ridge, and gable copings. On the left of the entrance front is one tall storey and two bays, and on the right are two storeys and one bay, In the right bay is a doorway and a shuttered window to the right. The left two bays contain a gabled porch, and two round-arched windows with keystones, and there are two similar windows on the west front. At the rear is a basement, sash windows, a doorway and an outhouse.	II
St Thomas' Church; 54.43764°N 0.80791°W		1792	The church, which was remodelled in 1876, is in sandstone with a green slate roof. It consists of a continuous nave and chancel, and a west tower. The tower has a hood mould below the bell openings, which have two slightly pointed lights, a parapet stepped up at the angles, and a pyramidal roof with a ball finial and a weathervane. On the south wall of the nave is a sundial dated 1793.	II
Glaisdale Hall and wall 54.43913°N 0.81013°W	—	1798	A farmhouse that was extended in 1820, it is in sandstone, with quoins, and a pantile roof with stone copings and kneelers. There are two storeys, the main house has three bays and the extension has two. The main house has a central doorway, and the windows in both parts are sashes. All the openings in the main house have quoined surrounds and lintels carved to resemble voussoirs. On the right return is an external double staircase. The wall around the forecourt is in sandstone with quoins, and it contains a pair of gateposts with swept pyramidal tops.	II
Stable and byre southeast of Hart Hall; 54.43408°N 0.80758°W	—	Late 18th to early 19th century	A gin-gang and a pigsty were added to the stable and byre in the 19th century. The building is in sandstone with stepped eaves and a pantile roof. There is a single storey and a loft, and an L-shaped plan, and it contains scattered openings. In the southeast gable end are rows of pigeon holes with shelves, and slit vents. Above the pigsty is a hen house, and throughstones form steps up to a hen hole.	II
Boilerhouse and pigsty/henhouse, Postgate Farm; 54.42928°N 0.83245°W	—	Late 18th to early 19th century	The boilerhouse is attached to the pigsty with the henhouse above. The building is in sandstone, and has a pantile roof with stone gable copings and square kneelers. There is one storey with a loft, and an L-shaped plan. Stone steps lead up to the henhouse door, over which are two pigeon holes and a shelf.	II
Byre and loft, Postgate Farm; 54.42935°N 0.83239°W	—	Late 18th to early 19th century	A byre with a hayloft above in sandstone on a plinth, with a pantile roof, stone gable copings and square kneelers. There is one storey and a loft, and a rear lean-to. It contains small scattered openings, and at the rear are stone steps to the loft door, a boarded door on the ground floor and three pitching doors.	II
Glaisdale Head Methodist Church and walls 54.42951°N 0.83314°W		1821	The chapel and attached manse, which were extended in 1850, are in sandstone, the original part with a Westmorland slate roof, and the extension with a purple slate roof. The chapel has one tall storey, and a square plan with fronts of two bays. The windows are round-headed sashes with voussoirs, and on the west front is a gabled porch with an inscribed and dated oval plaque. The manse has two storeys and a basement, one gabled bay facing the road, and steps leading up to the doorway. The extension on the east side is approached by steps in the angle, and the windows are sashes. In front is a wall with heavy flat coping, and at the left are steps up to the chapel, with a large square dated pier with a domed square cap at the bottom . From this, railings with curved heads run alongside the steps.	II
Barn southeast of Lawns Farmhouse; 54.46085°N 0.85404°W	—	Early 19th century	A small barn in sandstone on a plinth, with stepped eaves, and a pantile roof with stone copings. It contains small boarded openings.	II
Lealholm Bridge; 54.45809°N 0.82499°W		Early 19th century	The bridge carries Lealholm Lane over the River Esk. It is in sandstone and consists of a single deep segmental arch with voussoirs and an arch ring. The bridge has a band broken around a buttress, and the parapet has shallow sloped coping. The northwest parapet has been replaced by railings with stone piers, and at the ends he parapets and abutments are splayed out.	II
Byre, barn and gin-gang, Postgate Farm; 54.42951°N 0.83222°W	—	Early 19th century	The building is in sandstone with pantile roofs. There is one storey and a loft, and a long range containing five stable doors and windows. On the left return is a stone staircase to a loft door. To the south is a gin-gang with a half-octagonal end and a hipped roof.	II
Farmbuildings southeast of York House; 54.42311°N 0.84937°W	—	Early 19th century	A range of byres and barns in sandstone, with pantile roofs and stone coping. There is one storey and a loft, and seven bays. To the south is a single-storey wheelhouse with a pyramidal roof.	II
Wesleyan Chapel, Lealholm; 54.45790°N 0.82742°W		1839	The chapel is in sandstone, with a sill band, and a purple slate roof with a stone ridge, copings and curved kneelers. There is one tall storey, three bays, and a small single-storey extension to the southeast. The doorway has a pointed-arched head and a hooded fanlight. The windows are sashes, also with pointed-arched heads. Above the doorway is a square panel with fan-patterned spandrels and a dated and inscribed oval plaque.	II*
Prospect House; 54.46225°N 0.81753°W	—	Mid 19th century	The house is in sandstone with quoins, a frieze, a moulded cornice, and a hipped Welsh slate roof with stone copings and kneelers. There are two storeys and a rusticated basement, three bays, and a two-storey rear wing. Steps with cast iron handrails lead up to the central doorway that has a fanlight, pilasters, a panelled frieze, and a pediment. The windows are sashes with moulded surrounds, those in the ground floor with panelled pilasters, cornices and pediments, those in the upper floor with panelled surrounds, and the basement windows have plain surrounds.	II
Walls, railings and gates, Prospect House; 54.46209°N 0.81771°W	—	Mid 19th century	The walls enclosing the front garden are in sandstone. The side walls have shallow gabled coping and are ramped, and the front walls are rusticated on the outside, and have moulded coping. The railings and gates are in cast iron with ornamental standards.	II
Church of St James the Greater; 54.45876°N 0.82422°W		1901–02	The church, designed by Temple Moore in modified Early English style, is in sandstone with a clay tile roof. It consists of a three-bay nave, a south porch, a three-bay chancel with a small north vestry, and a slim west tower. The tower has a single stage, a chamfered plinth, a west lancet window with a double-chamfered surround, shouldered-arched bell openings, and a corbelled-out embattled parapet. The windows in the body of the church have pointed heads and shouldered lintels., and the east window has three stepped lancets.	II*
Drinking fountain 54.45836°N 0.82462°W		1904	The drinking fountain is in stone, it is set in the slope of a bank, and has an ogee-shaped head and a cornice. In the centre is an arched niche with voussoirs and a dated and initialled keystone. Inside, there is an iron standpipe with the maker's mark, a grilled drain and a chained iron cup.	II
Glaisdale War Memorial; 54.43838°N 0.80642°W		1920	The war memorial, by a road junction, is in stone, and consists of a cross about 5 metres (16 ft) high. It has a Latin cross head on an octagonal shaft, on a tapering square plinth, on a three-stage square base. Projecting from the plinth are inscribed tablets, and on the other three sides of the plinth are the names of those lost in the First World War.	II
Lealholm War Memorial; 54.45845°N 0.82445°W		1920	The war memorial is in stone, and consists of a wheel-head cross in the style of a Celtic cross. On the cross arms is interlace decoration carved in relief. The shaft stands on a tapering plinth on a base of two steps. On the shaft and plinth are inscriptions, and the names of those who were lost in the First World War, and those who served and returned.	II
Garden wall and outhouse, Bainley Bank Cottage; 54.42832°N 0.86376°W	—	Undated	Enclosing the garden is a dry stone wall with squared transverse coping. It is attached at one corner to a gabled outhouse with a pantile roof.	II
Outbuildings north of Glaisdale Hall; 54.43950°N 0.80994°W	—	Undated	The long range of farm buildings is in sandstone, with a pantile roof, stone copings and kneelers. There is one storey and a loft, and it contains doorways, two round-arched cart entrances, and loading doors.	II
