= Eskdale, North Yorkshire =

Valley in North Yorkshire, England

Coordinates: 54.478°N 0.786°W

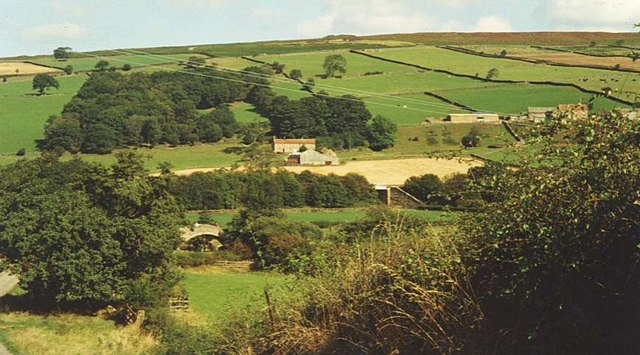
View across the valley near Danby Castle

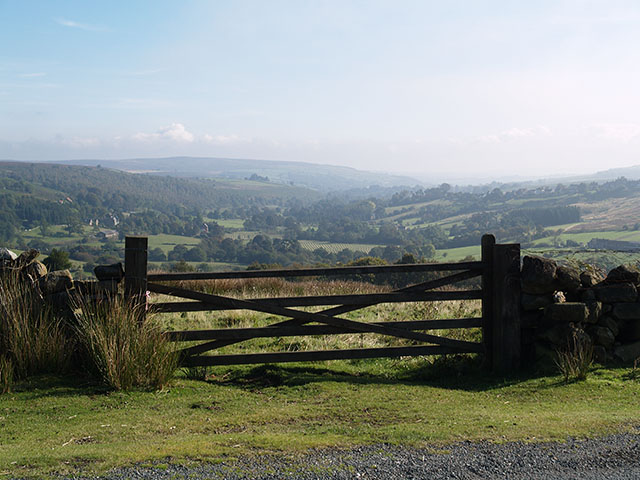
Looking down the valley

Eskdale is a valley running west to east from Westerdale on the North York Moors to Whitby on the Yorkshire Coast of England. Formed during the last major ice age, it has a classic U-shaped valley formation caused by the action of glaciers carving away the rock. Eskdale is named after its river, which in Celtic means "water" or "stream". The dale carries the River Esk from the "Esklets" above Westerdale to the sea at Whitby. The tops of its steep-sided valleys are noted for their heather moorland, whilst below the land is mainly split between pasture for cows and Swaledale sheep and arable crops such as oilseed rape.

The river flows through the narrow valley that the water has cut into the soft shale of the Jurassic rocks. Because of this, the rainfall can cause rapid flooding like those suffered in 1840, 1930 and in 2000. The 1930 flood caused many problems including destroying the bridge over the river in Sleights.

The A169 road bridge that runs over the Esk in Sleights village dates from 1937.

A natural gas accumulation is present in the Permian dolomitic limestones at Eskdale. Natural gas from this field was used in the 1960s and 1970s by the former North Eastern Gas Board to supply Whitby and other local towns.

Eskdale School in Whitby is named after the valley.

== Access ==
The Esk Valley Walk is a walk covering 35 miles (56 km) starting from the head of the Esk through the valley and down to Whitby.

The Esk Valley railway line runs through Eskdale from Commondale eastwards towards Whitby and is named after the dale.
