= Houlsyke =

Hamlet in North Yorkshire, England

Coordinates: 54.455371°N 0.854187°W

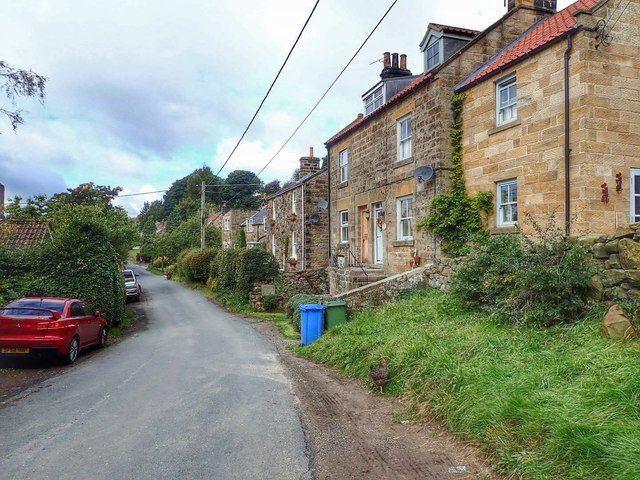
- Road in Houlsyke

- Location within North Yorkshire
- OS grid reference: NZ737079
- Civil parish: Glaisdale
- Unitary authority: North Yorkshire
- Ceremonial county: North Yorkshire
- Region: Yorkshire and the Humber
- Country: England
- Sovereign state: United Kingdom
- Post town: WHITBY
- Postcode district: YO21
- Dialling code: 01947
- Police: North Yorkshire
- Fire: North Yorkshire
- Ambulance: Yorkshire
- UK Parliament: Scarborough and Whitby

Houlsyke is a hamlet in the Glaisdale civil parish, in North Yorkshire, England. It is situated between Danby and Lealholm.It is not a large village or town. There is no separate official population figure published for Houlsyke in national census records.

== See also ==
- Listed buildings in Glaisdale
