= Lealholm =

Village in North Yorkshire, England

Coordinates: 54°27′32″N 0°49′30″W

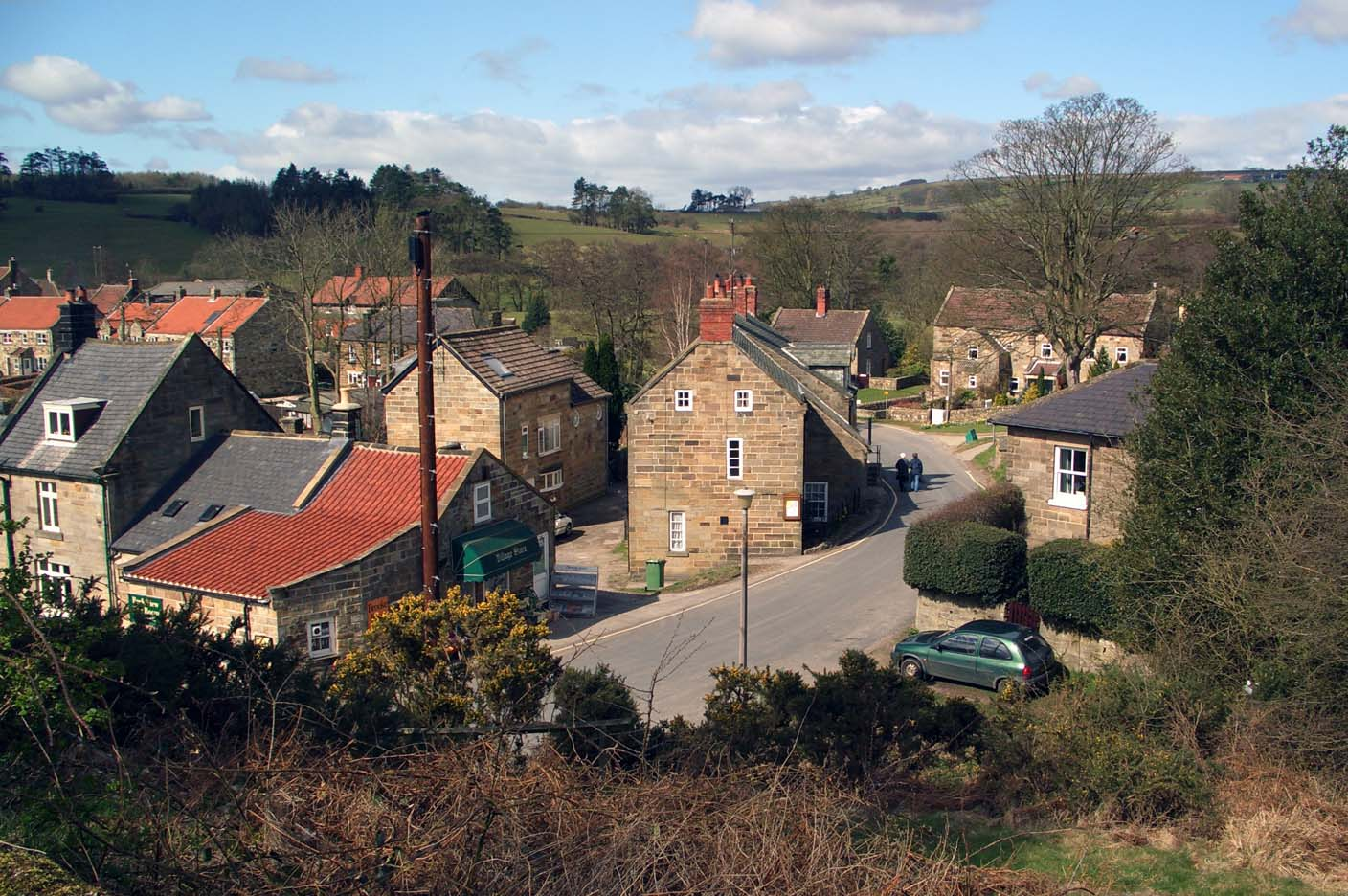
- Lealholm in winter

- Location within North Yorkshire
- Population: 383 (total for E00141687 output area, 2011)
- OS grid reference: NZ 762 076
- Civil parish: Glaisdale
- Unitary authority: North Yorkshire
- Ceremonial county: North Yorkshire
- Region: Yorkshire and the Humber
- Country: England
- Sovereign state: United Kingdom
- Post town: WHITBY
- Postcode district: YO21
- Dialling code: 01947
- Police: North Yorkshire
- Fire: North Yorkshire
- Ambulance: Yorkshire
- UK Parliament: Scarborough and Whitby

Lealholm is a small village in the Glaisdale civil parish, in the county of North Yorkshire, England. It is sited at a crossing point of the River Esk, in Eskdale which is within the North York Moors National Park. It is 9.5 miles (15.3 km) by road from the nearest town of Whitby, and approximately 27 miles (43 km) from both Middlesbrough and Scarborough. The village is typical of those found all across the North York Moors which straddle the main through-routes along the valley bottoms. It is mostly built of local stone with pantiled or slate roofs.

Settlement around modern-day Lealholm can be traced back to the Domesday Book of 1086, with entries concerning the Manor of Crumbeclive and "Lelum" at the site of Lealholm Hall, Lealholmside. Lealholmside is a hamlet by Lealholm, and was a popular location with the photographer Francis Meadow Sutcliffe. A honeypot during the summer months, Lealholm is located midway along the Esk valley between the villages of Glaisdale, to the east and Danby to the west. Lealholm is on the route of the Esk valley railway line, which runs from Whitby to Middlesbrough, and is served by Lealholm railway station. A large part of the community is involved in farming due to the high fertility of the slopes in Eskdale, whilst other members of the community are involved in tourism or commute to industrial centres such as Middlesbrough. This led to the economy of the area being hard hit by the 2001 UK foot and mouth crisis.

Lealhom was a place of affection for Irish-born poet John Castillo, who wrote "Ah lovely Lealholm! Where shall I begin. To say what thou art now and once hast been?".

== History ==
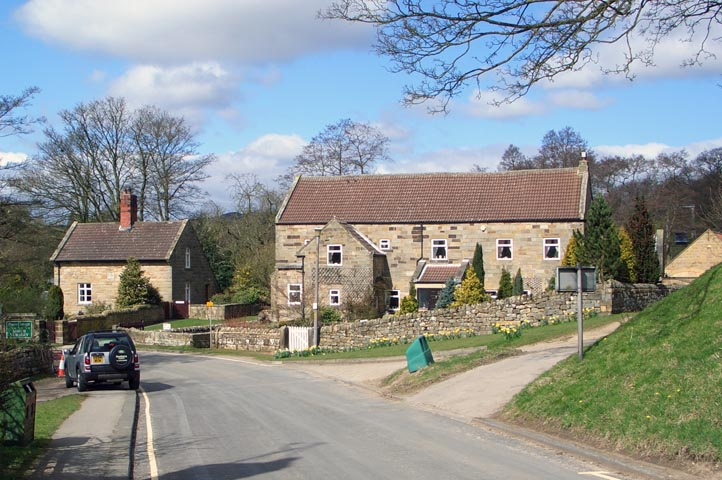
Former Water Mill

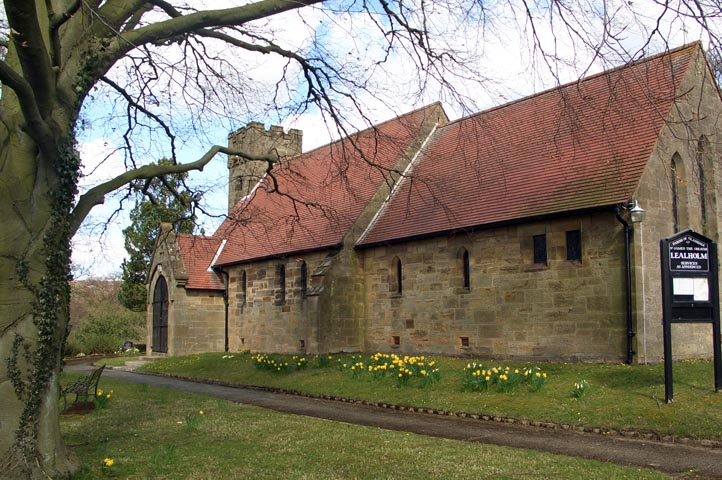
St. James the Greater

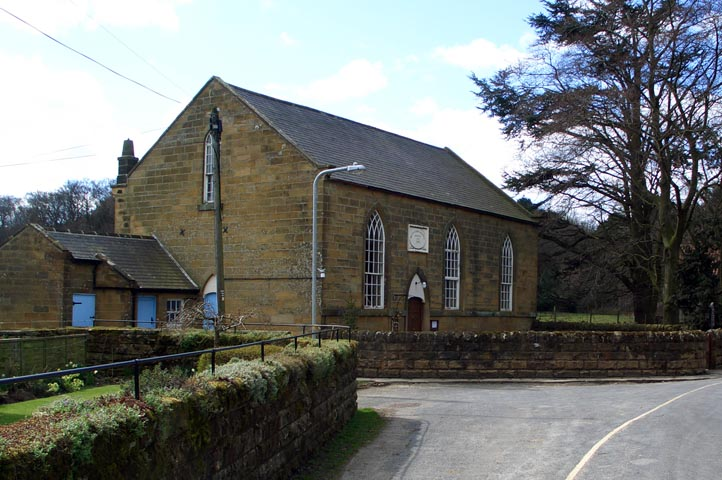
Methodist Chapel

The origins of this community stretch back to a period when farming and the movement of stock was almost exclusively the main source of activity. Lealholm was a convenient place for travellers to cross the River Esk. People set up residence here in the hope and expectation of earning a living from such travellers. The etymology of the Lealholm name is uncertain but "lǣl" was the word for a willow twig or withy in the Old English language and holm was a settlement, thus the settlement by or near the willow trees. At the time of the Domesday survey, the site of the current village was heavily wooded, but with five charcoal-hungry iron smelting furnaces operating at the manor by 1274 AD, the valley floor was cleared quickly of trees enabling drainage, cultivation and settlement of the land. Fulling mills, hostelries and other traders set up bases around this river crossing and thereby formed the nucleus of today's village centre. Until the middle of the 19th century Lealholm was the main centre of the parish of Glaisdale and many of the parish offices and functions were administered from here. Lealholm was home to at least one mill for centuries, and the earliest records show a water mill located within the village in 1336 belonging to the Lord of the Manor, William le Latimer, 3rd Baron of Danby. As the mill was fed by the small Cow Beck, water could have been in short supply during dry summer months, and by 1709 it was demolished. A Quaker, Thomas Whatson, built a new mill on the old site, constructing a long mill-race from Crunkly Ghyll through the village to join Cow Beck. The mill-race now forms the boundary of the cricket pitch surrounding it on most sides as it passes the mill. The mill owners had the authority to clean and remove any woodland, earth or rubbish within 40 yards (37 m) of the mill-race. Also, "all persons that shall grind corn and grain at the mill" had the right "to sieve and sift on two parcels of ground called Adam Rigg and Ellergates". Thus, the outcrop of hillside rising towards the station became known as Oatmeal Hill. When the semi-detached houses at 3 and 4 Railway Cottages were purchased 1970, they were combined and the building became known as "Oatmill Cottage". The village also had a paper mill, which employed up to 20 people in its heyday. The site is now a garden centre, known as "Poet's Cottage" after John Castillo, who lived in a cottage on the site, now demolished. In more recent times, a mill, owned by the Nelson family, was used as the village hall, and became known as Nelson Hall. In the late 1980s it was sold and converted into a house. The historic Shepherds Hall was built in 1873 and was a meeting place for the Loyal Order of Ancient Shepherds Friendly Society. It is a unique building housing a tea rooms and riverside tea gardens.

The way of life in the village changed little over the centuries as the farming was always the mixed inbyland and open moors system. Village craftsmen such as blacksmiths and joiners provided for the needs of their own farming community and combined their specialist skills with subsistence farming. An 1823 trade directory lists 17 farmers, four shoemakers, three corn millers, two blacksmiths, two butchers, two victuallers (one also a tallow chandler), a tailor, a wheelwright, and a "blue, brown, and shop paper manufacturer" in Lealholm. The Industrial Revolution absorbed some of the local population as the nearby boom town of Middlesbrough expanded its iron and steel industry but essentially, in this remote area, the farming economy survived until after the Second World War and the mechanisation of agriculture.

Despite Queen Elizabeth I's Penal laws, Catholicism flourished across many parts of Yorkshire and Lancashire during the 1600s, thanks to the support of local gentry and priests such as Fr. Nicholas Postgate. Today, Catholic churches are sited at both Lealholm and Egton Bridge along the Esk Valley.

On Friday 27 April 1979, an USAF Phantom aircraft from Alconbury was performing low level tactical reconnaissance over the North York Moors when the engine stalled. The aircraft banked left, striking the ground to the west of Lealholmside before cartwheeling in a fireball across fields for almost half a mile below the houses. Pilot Major Donald Lee Schuyler and Navigator Lt Thomas Wheeler were killed in the crash. A memorial stone, erected by villagers, stands on the site of the crash alongside the road between Lealholm and Lealholmside.

== Governance ==
Lealhom's first tier of local government is Glaisdale Parish Council, where Lealholm ward elects three of the seven councillors, the others representing Glaisdale ward. Unusually, the two wards are represented separately at the next tier of government, the borough (non-metropolitan district).

From 1974 to 2023 it was part of the Borough of Scarborough, it is now administered by the unitary North Yorkshire Council.

Lealholm is in the Scarborough and Whitby parliamentary constituency.

== Geography ==
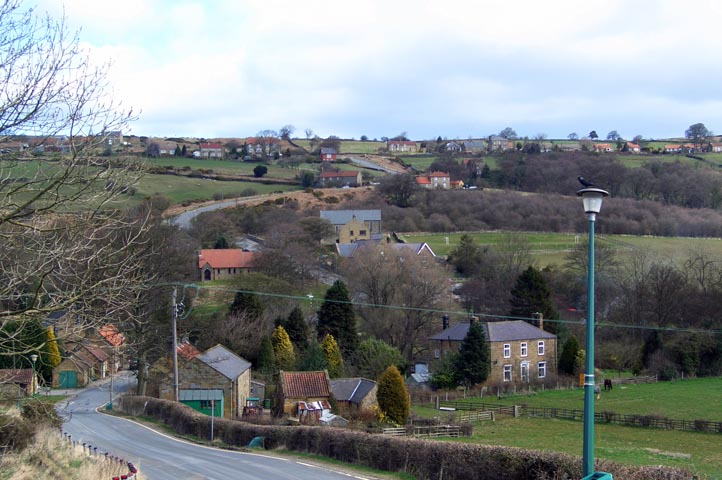
Lealholm and Lealholmside

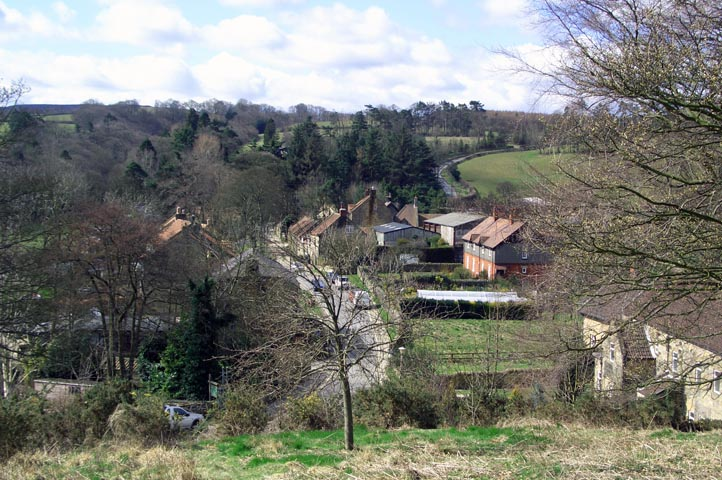
View across to Crunkly Ghyll

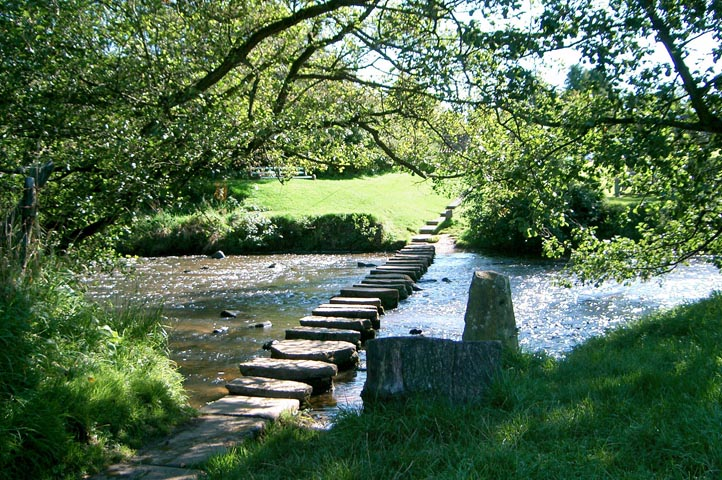
Stepping stones across the Esk

At the head of the village stands the woodland and steep sided valley of Crunkly Ghyll, a ravine carved by the River Esk through the hillside where the river drops 100 feet (30 m) from the valley above to reach the village. It was formed during the last great ice age as a huge wall of ice moved across the landscape carving out what is now the Esk Valley as far as Lealholm. At its head it formed a massive dam blocking the flow of water from above and creating a lake running back up the valley to Commondale. As the ice melted, the river forced its way out carving the present-day ravine.

The main village of Lealholm is situated at the bottom of Crunkly Ghyll (sometimes spelled "Crunkley" and "Gill"), a deep cutting where the river emerges into the flat bottom of a glacial U-shaped valley. This was crucial to its development as a settlement, becoming an important crossing point over the River Esk where the valley flattens out, becoming shallow at end of a sharp bend in the river before slowing to a deeper meandering course further downstream. The remains of the fording point are still visible next to the arched bridge used today, which dates back to the 17th century. Three roads lead from the centre of the village, one follows the river up the valley towards Danby; the second heads north past the hamlet of Lealholmside and across the moors towards Whitby; and the third leads south, towards Fryup and Rosedale.

Typical of the area are the medieval cruck-built longhouses of Lealholm. These were constructed as single storey combined dwelling and beast houses and made of the local Jurassic limestone. Originally they had ling thatched roofs, but they were mostly re-roofed in the 19th century with slate or pantiles.

Despite having less than 50 houses within the boundaries of the main settlement, Lealholm has a selection of amenities, including a village shop, post office, petrol station and farm goods store. It also has the Forge Art Gallery (formerly a pottery), an Infant and Primary School, a cricket and football pitch, and three churches. The historic Shepherds Hall housing a tea rooms and riverside tea gardens. A village green, where the local team play quoits, sits alongside the river. The Ley Hall is the venue for public gatherings. It is used for the local playgroup, young farmers, the parish council and the WI among others. The Board Inn public house – a former coaching inn. – dates from the 18th century, and as the only public house in the village and it is a popular venue and regularly holds domino drives.

Lealholm is in the Anglican parish of Glaisdale, within the deanery of Whitby, the Archdeaconry of Cleveland, and the Diocese of York. There are three churches located within the main settlement, the Roman Catholic Our Lady of the Sacred Heart Church, the Church of England St James' Church, and Lealholm Methodist Chapel. Close to the chapel, between the River Esk and the mill race stands a Quaker Friends Burial Ground, donated by Thomas Whatson.

=== Climate ===
As part of the United Kingdom, the North York Moors area, in which Lealholm lies, generally has cool summers and relatively mild winters. Weather conditions vary from day to day as well as from season to season. The latitude of the area means that it is influenced by predominantly westerly winds with depressions and their associated fronts, bringing with them unsettled and windy weather, particularly in winter. Between depressions there are often small mobile anticyclones that bring periods of fair weather. In winter anticyclones bring cold dry weather. In summer the anticyclones tend to bring dry settled conditions which can lead to drought. For its latitude this area is mild in winter and cooler in summer due to the influence of the Gulf Stream in the northern Atlantic Ocean. Air temperature varies on a daily and seasonal basis. The temperature is usually lower at night and January is the coldest time of the year. The two dominant influences on the climate of Lealholm are the shelter against the worst of the moist westerly winds provided by the higher ground and the proximity of the North Sea. Late, chilly springs and cool summers are a feature of the area but there are often spells of fine autumn weather. Onshore winds in spring and early summer bring mists or low stratus clouds (known locally as sea frets) to the area. Within the area variations in climate are brought about by local differences in altitude, aspect and shelter. Snowfall is variable from year to year. Heavy falls are associated with north-easterly winds off the North Sea.

=== River Esk ===
The River Esk dog-legs through the village. In the centre stands the bridge which crosses the Esk a few yards south of the old fording point. 400 yards (370 m) further upstream lies a set of stepping stones. Between these two the river becomes very deep as it bends sharply to the right. Due to its proximity to the River Esk and its tributaries, flooding has long been a problem for some of the lower lying houses in the village. Marks carved into the side wall of the Methodist chapel show the heights of floods in the past. At the lowest level, the floods in November 2000 stand just short of the floods in July 1840. However, these were low compared to major flooding on 23 July 1930 when the Methodist chapel stood more than 3 feet 3 inches (1 m) underwater, even though the chapel itself stands approximately 7 feet (2.1 m) above the normal water level of the river. This same flood caused the collapse of bridges over the river at Glaisdale, Egton and Sleights, further down the valley.

=== Lealholmside ===
Overlooking the village stands the hamlet of Lealholmside – a row of approximately 25 houses running along the side of the valley. It was a popular location with the photographer Francis Meadow Sutcliffe, who took many pictures in the area, although few of the village itself are in publication. It is here that the site of Lelum was located, at or near the present site of Lealholm Hall and home to the de Lelum family in 1274.

== Demography ==
Figures for the population of Lealholm alone are not readily available. The population of the parish of Glaisdale (including settlements of Glaisdale, Houlsyke, Lealholm and Street) was 974 living in 404 households in the UK 2001 Census. Of this number, 73% live in the 1% of the area which is classified as "urban", while 27% of the population lives in the 99% "rural" area.

At the 2011 Census, figures for the E00141687 output area, which includes all of Lealholm as well as Houlsyke and a large rural area, indicated a population of 383.

== Economy ==
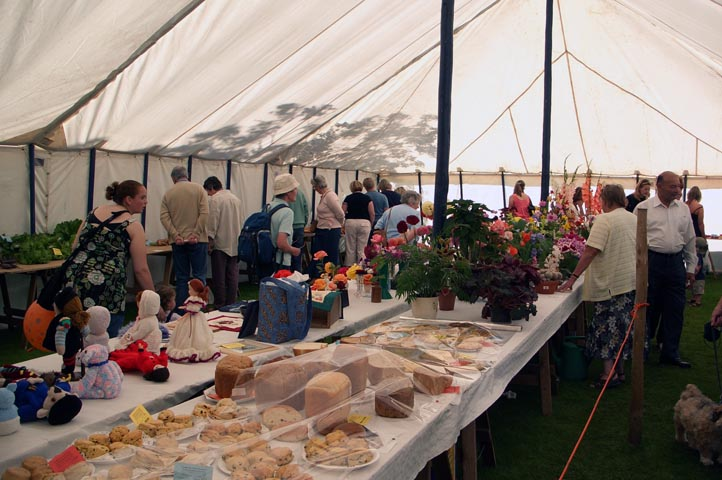
Produce on Display

Lealholm remained a traditional, labour-intensive, mixed farming community until the 1970s. In the second half of twentieth century increasing mechanization of farming operations led to a rapid decline of employment opportunities in agriculture in the surrounding area. However, the rise in the ownership of cars brought tourism into the North York Moors area and the village is a tourist honeypot in the summer months. Employment in tourism has risen rapidly and the village now has guest houses, holiday cottages, bed and breakfast accommodation and catering establishments providing jobs and income along with services and retailers. Lealholm had a typical NER goods shed and coal yard close to the railway station, which became a factory base when the company Lightspeed panels were set up in 1972. They produced the Magenta kit car, a fibreglass body kit based on an MG 1100. Today the site is a car repair garage.

== Culture and community ==
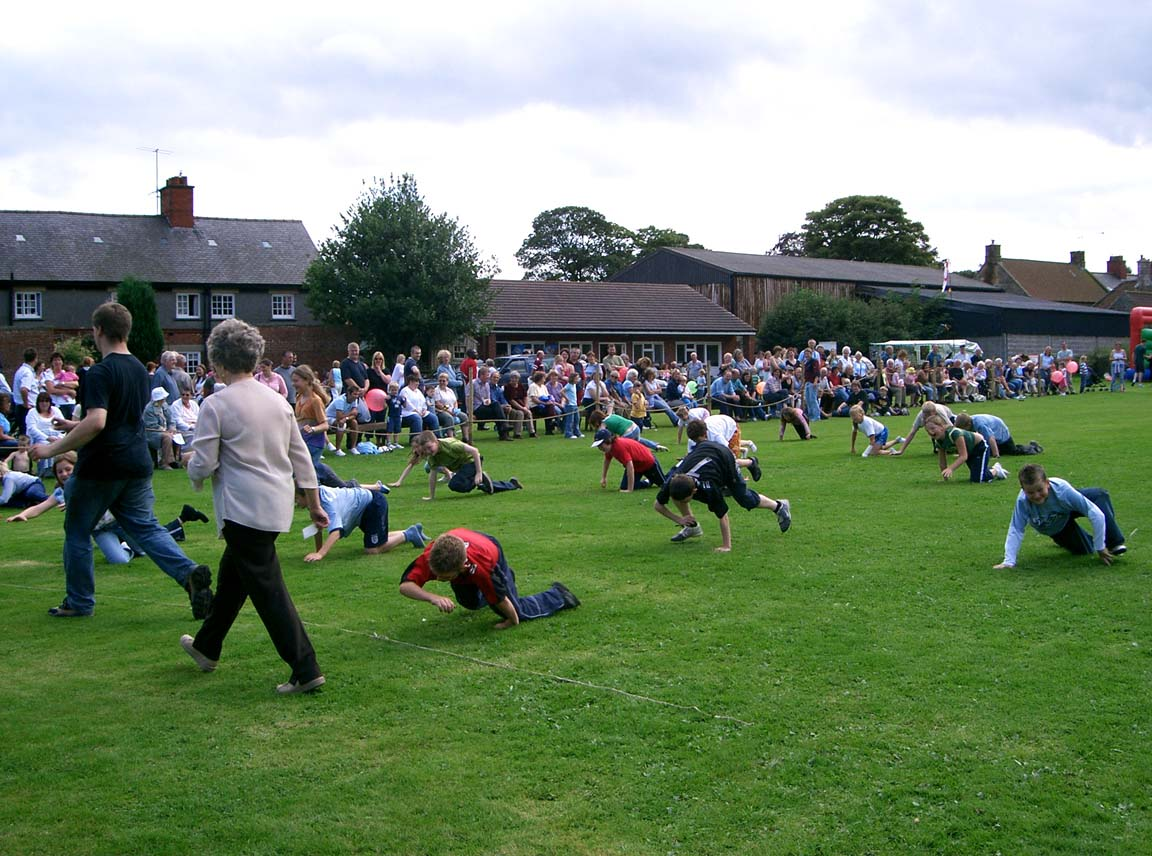
Lealholm Show Sports

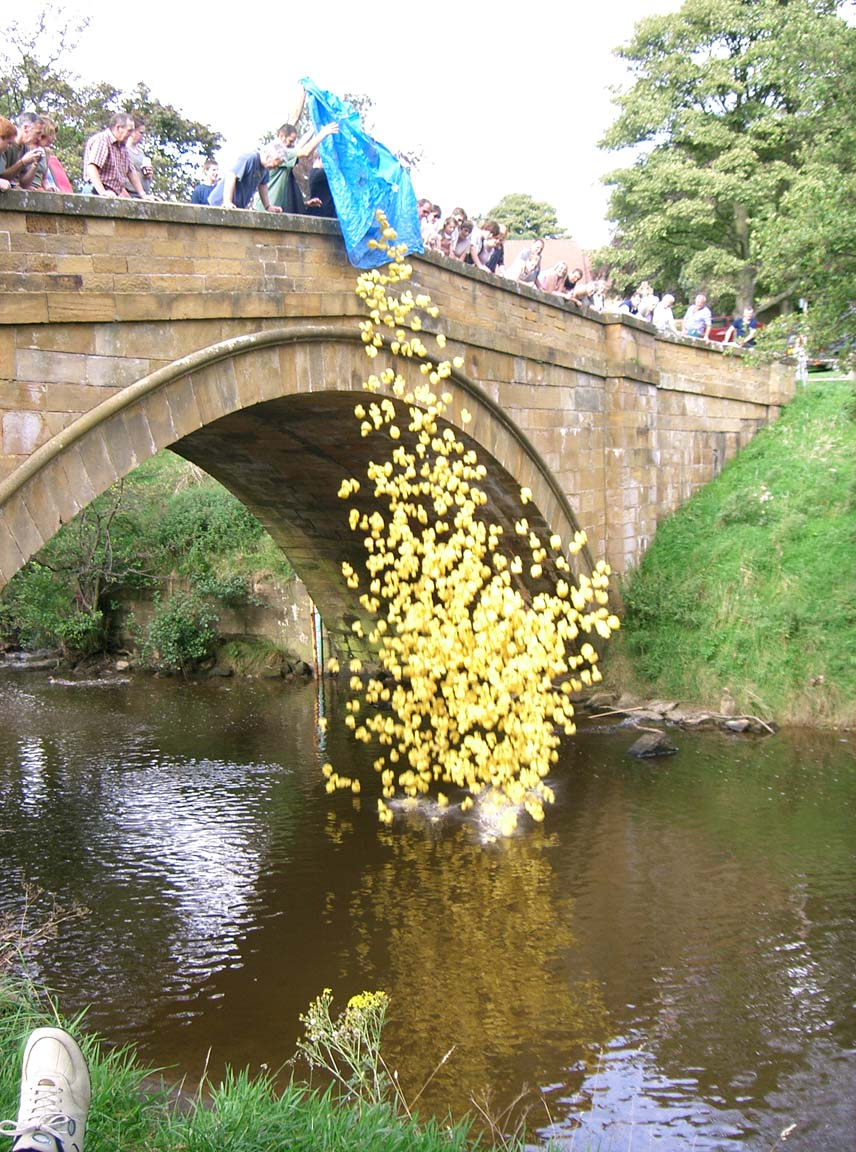
Duck Race

There is a choir based in Lealholm which performs at venues in the surrounding area. The Board Inn is the base for the village football and cricket teams as well as hosting dominoes and darts matches. The River Esk is used for angling, with salmon and sea trout being caught in abundance.

Lealholm Village Show and sports day is held by the Lealholm Farm Produce and Horticultural Society on the first Saturday in September. The show, known as the Lealholm Agricultural Show, takes place on the village sports field, usually reserved for cricket during the summer months, and football during winter. It held its 87th show in 2007. There was no show in 1970, and in 2001 the organisers decided it would be inappropriate to hold the show due to the Foot and mouth outbreak. In 2008, the show was cancelled for the first time in its history. Due to bad weather, the cricket pitch became waterlogged after weeks of heavy rain and a torrential downpour in the days leading up to the show. The show has over 200 exhibitions of crafts, wine making, fruit, vegetables and farm produce for competition including categories for children. Children's sports and a fancy dress parade are held on the cricket pitch and are always well supported, although there usually has to be a lot of persuasion for entries into the adult's "Twice round the field" competition. Side stalls include "Bowl for a Goose", where competitors attempt to bowl five balls through holes in a frame at the end of a short but bumpy pitch. The winner can take home a live goose, have it delivered for Christmas or receive a cash prize.

In the past few years the village show has been expanded to feature displays of steam engines, fire safety and brass band performances, demonstrations by St John Ambulance and a bouncy castle. Entries to the show's various competitions are made during the morning ready for judging prior to the show opening to the public in the afternoon. A Domino Drive in aid of show funds is usually held the Thursday evening following the village show at the Board Inn public house in the village.

The biggest event of the afternoon is the Grand Duck Race on the River Esk, where 1,000 numbered plastic ducks are launched along the river towards a finishing point some 250 yards (230 m) downstream. The six fastest ducks are then picked out at the finishing line to win cash prizes. The ducks are launched from the top of the village bridge.

== Media ==
The Esk Valley is served by local newspaper The Whitby Gazette, published on a Tuesday and Friday, as well as the Middlesbrough & Teesside based daily – The Evening Gazette. Despite being located in North Yorkshire, Lealholm's location at the bottom of the valley prevents BBC Local Radio transmissions broadcast by Radio York, which serves the rest of the region, being received. Instead, local radio broadcast service is relayed on BBC Tees from Bilsdale to the south-west. Due to the same geographic restrictions, regional terrestrial television is provided by Tyne Tees Television and BBC North East and Cumbria from Newcastle upon Tyne. Digital radio stations and digital television channels are also broadcast from Bilsdale but reception is often difficult also due to the village's geography. Reception of television for most houses in the bottom of the valley comes from the Limber Hill relay transmitter, between Egton and Glaisdale further down the valley.

Independent Local Radio is provided from Bilsdale by TFM, Capital North East and Heart North East. Greatest Hits Radio Yorkshire Coast is also available locally; broadcast from Scarborough via the Whitby transmitter.

== Education ==
The non-denominational Lealholm Primary School educates children from the age of five until they leave at the age of eleven. In 2008 there were 52 pupils at the school, including 20 infants. The school received one outstanding and four other good grades in its 2013 Ofsted inspection report. Older pupils travel to secondary schools and a college in Whitby.

== Sport ==
Lealholm Cricket Club and ground is situated behind the Forge Cottages, on the northwestern side of the village and the club have a Midweek Senior XI team competing in the Esk Valley Evening League.

== Notable people ==
John Castillo (1792–1845), poet and lay preacher, often referred to as "The Bard of the Dales", lived in Lealholm on the site now known as "Poets Cottage", which today operates as a plant nursery.

John Davidson (1889–1988), "The Chronicler of Lealholm", chronicled the history of the village in books and correspondence in the Whitby Gazette. He was a shipbroker originally from Stockton-on-Tees, who held a great deal of affection for the village and carried out much research on the area. His published books include The Manor, Lordship and Castle of Danby and Chronicles of Lealholm & Glaisdale. The books are out of print, but his painstaking research has been much copied and there are various publications in print today covering the history of the village.

== See also ==
- Listed buildings in Glaisdale

== Gallery ==
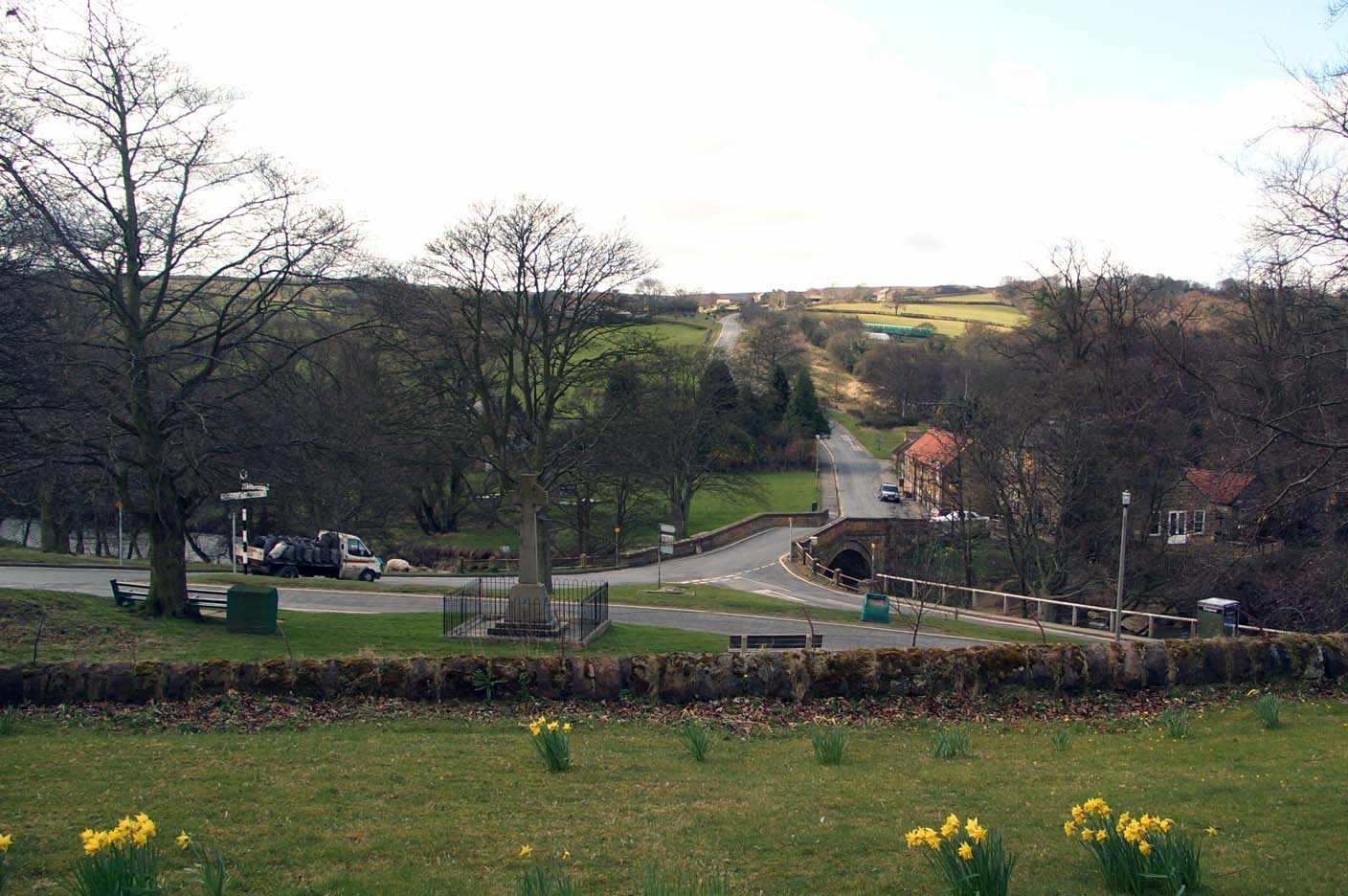
Lealholm in Winter from St James' Church

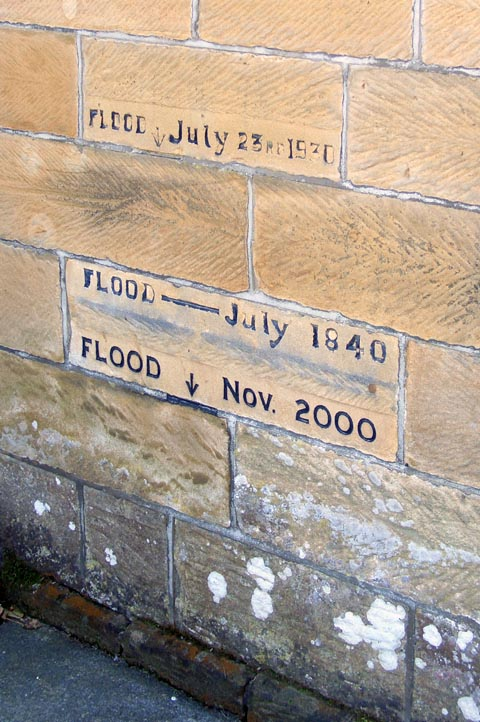
Chapel Flood Markings

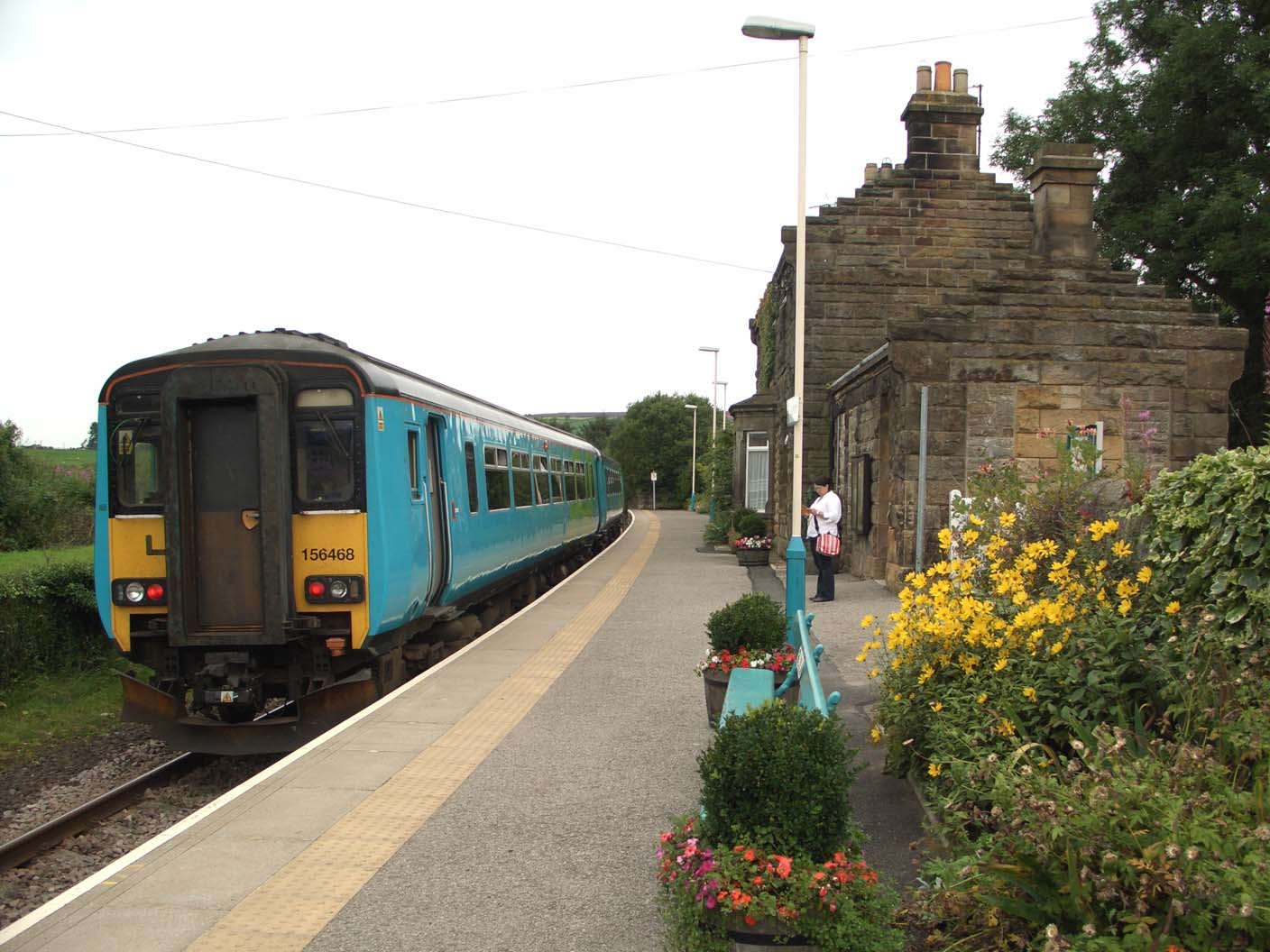
Lealholm Railway Station

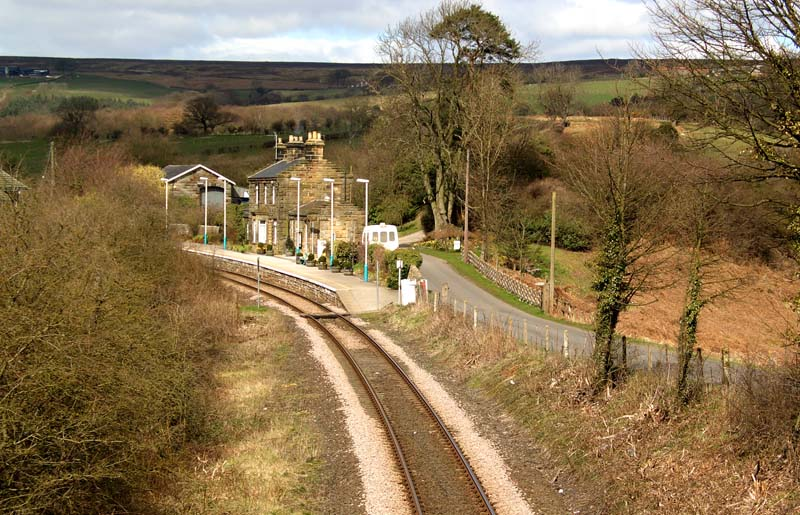
Lealholm Railway Station from road bridge
