= Beggar's Bridge =

Bridge in North Yorkshire, England

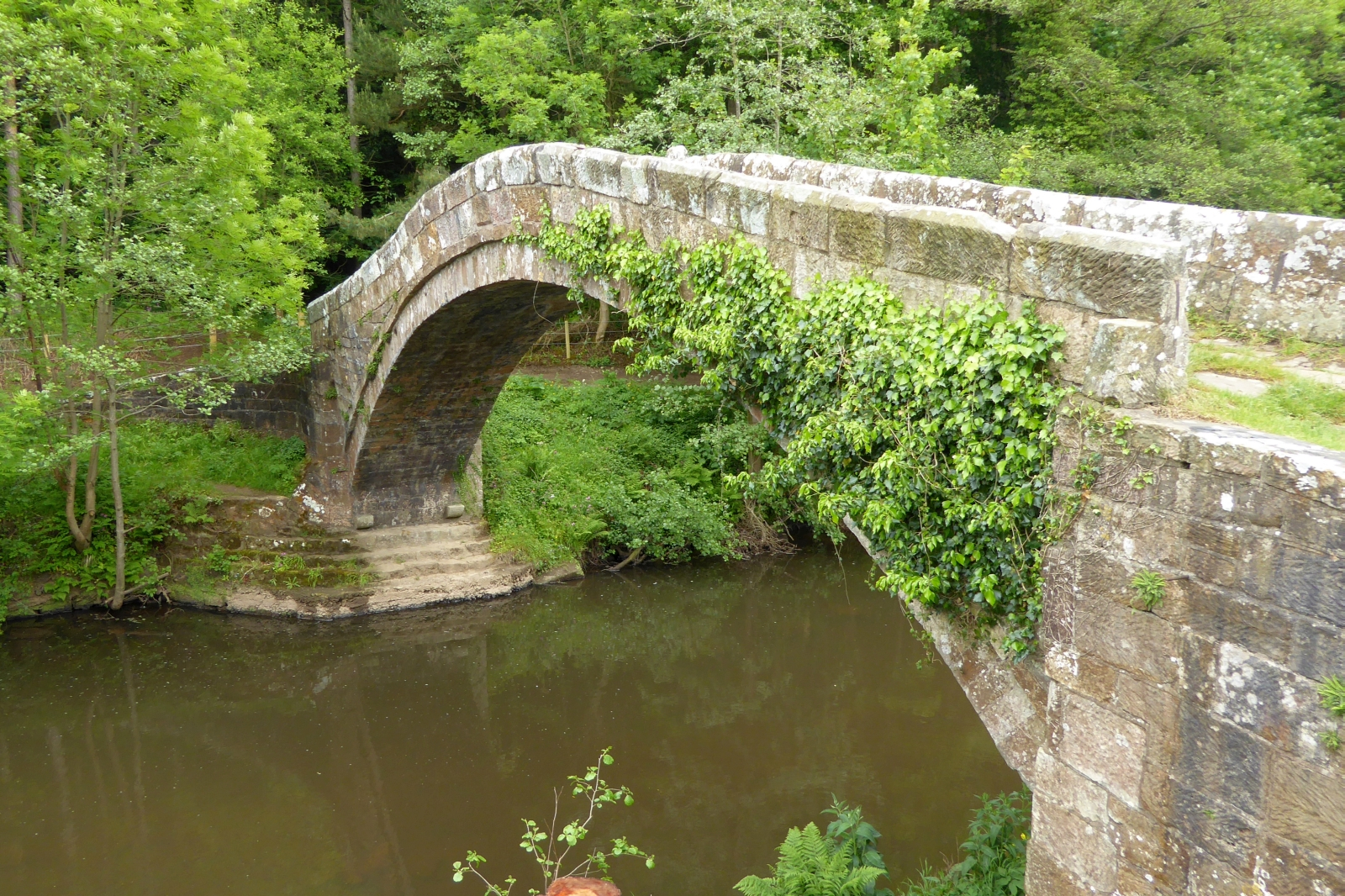
- Beggar's Bridge over the River Esk
- Coordinates: 54°26′19″N 0°47′31″W
- OS grid reference: NZ784054
- Crosses: River Esk
- Locale: Glaisdale, North Yorkshire
- Other name(s): Ferris Bridge

Characteristics
- Total length: 54 feet (16 m)
- Width: 6 feet 6 inches (1.98 m)

History
- Opened: 1619

Statistics

Listed Building – Grade II*
- Designated: 5 October 1969
- Reference no.: 1148573

Beggar's Bridge is a packhorse bridge straddling the River Esk in Glaisdale, North Yorkshire, England. The bridge dates back to 1619 and was reputedly built by a former poor farm worker (Tom Ferris) who wanted to meet his love but could not due to the river being in flood. Having become rich working at sea, then becoming the mayor of Kingston upon Hull, Ferris built the bridge at that point when flooding prevented him crossing it years before. The structure is both a scheduled monument and a grade II* listed building.

== History ==
The River Esk had five Medieval stone bridges crossing it; three in Danby, one in Sleights, and Beggar's Bridge in Glaisdale. The Medieval bridge crossing at Glaisdale was replaced by the current bridge in 1619, but it incorporates some of the stone used in the previous bridge which had collapsed in 1577.

The bridge's reputed construction is the result of the efforts of Thomas Ferris, the son of a poor farmer whole lived on the opposite bank of the river from Agnes, the woman he loved. The story holds that Agnes was the daughter of the local squire, who forbade the two from marrying due to Ferris being poor. Ferris resolved to make his fortune at sea, but on the night of his departure was unable to say his goodbyes to Agnes due to flooding that prevented him from crossing the river. Upon making his fortune Ferris returned to marry Agnes, and afterwards became the Lord Mayor of Kingston-upon-Hull. He subsequently built the bridge so that other lovers would not suffer as he and Agnes had. Elements of this story may be apocryphal however, as it appears that Agnes died in 1618, with the bridge being built later. It has been suggested that it was a memorial to her rather than a crossing for others. (Note: The Oxford Dictionary of National Biography states that "Thomas Ferries" married Alice Cowper of Hull in 1612, and after her death, Anne Thackray (also of Hull). It maintains that the notion of Ferries being married to Agnes is "...a romantic tale [that] seems to be without foundation.")

The bridge consists of a single arch with a ribbed underside, stretching 54 feet (16 m) over the Esk, with a maximum width of 6 feet 6 inches (1.98 m). The bridge has "unusually low parapets", and was the location of what has been termed a "bizarre accident". At the end of the 19th century, a cart was being pulled by two horses, but on nearing the end of the bridge, one of the horses jumped over the side and was hanged by its own harness. Not long after the bridge was finished, it was said to have been the site of a murder, and then haunting. A man killed his lover in a fit of rage and threw her body under the bridge, her headless body is rumoured to haunt the area.

Beggar's Bridge is quite close to the formation of the railway line between Battersby and Whitby (the old Cleveland Railway which connected to the Whitby & Pickering Railway at Grosmont), and during the course of construction of the railway, serious consideration was given to removing Beggar's Bridge altogether. The bridge lies near to the Coast to Coast Walk between St Bees and Robin Hood's Bay, with many walkers resting by the bridge. The bridge carried an old track between Whitby, Glaisdale and Egton, which continued across the moors to Pickering. The bridge was used as part of a packhorse route connecting Glaisdale with the high level road to Whitby (on the valley top to the north). In July 2023, some of the stones of the bridge were incised to a depth of 1.5 inches (38 mm) with an angle-grinder in what the North York Moors National Park Authority described as "a crude act of heritage crime." The bridge was formerly referred to as "Ferris Bridge" in honour of its builder, and besides being a scheduled monument, it was grade II* listed in 1969.

A short dramatised film based on the folk story of Ferris, Agnes and the bridge was released in 2010.

== See also ==
- List of crossings of the River Esk, North Yorkshire
- Grade II* listed buildings in North Yorkshire (district)
- Listed buildings in Egton
- Listed buildings in Glaisdale
