= St Thomas' Church, Glaisdale =

Church in England

Coordinates: 54°26′15″N 0°48′29″W

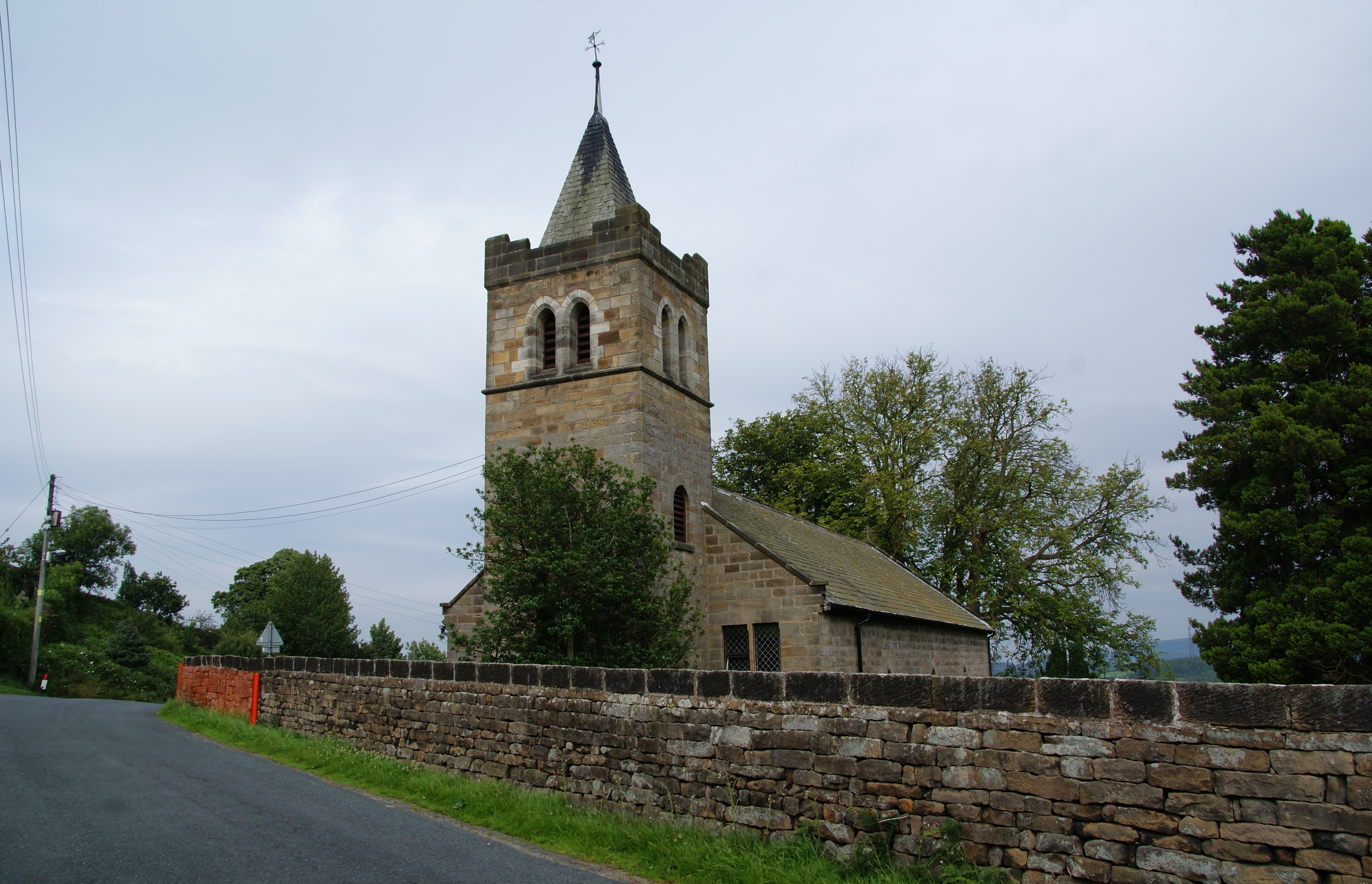
The church, in 2010

St Thomas' Church is the parish church of Glaisdale, a village in North Yorkshire, in England.

In 1585, a church was constructed in Glaisdale, acting as a chapel of ease to St Hilda's Church, Danby. It was demolished and a new church built between 1792 and 1794 in the Gothick style, from which period the nave and tower survive. The first burial in the new graveyard was in 1794, that of 17 year old Mary Mead, daughter of Thomas and Ann Mead. The church was remodelled from 1876 to 1879, the work including a new east end. The building was grade II listed in 1969.

The church is built of sandstone with a green slate roof. It consists of a continuous nave and chancel, and a west tower. The tower has a hood mould below the bell openings, which have two slightly pointed lights, a parapet stepped up at the angles, and a pyramidal roof with a ball finial and a weathervane. On the south wall of the nave is a sundial dated 1793. The building incorporates the datestone from the old chapel, inscribed "1585".

== See also ==
- Listed buildings in Glaisdale
