= Ainthorpe =

Village in North Yorkshire, England

Coordinates: 54.462940°N 0.915610°W

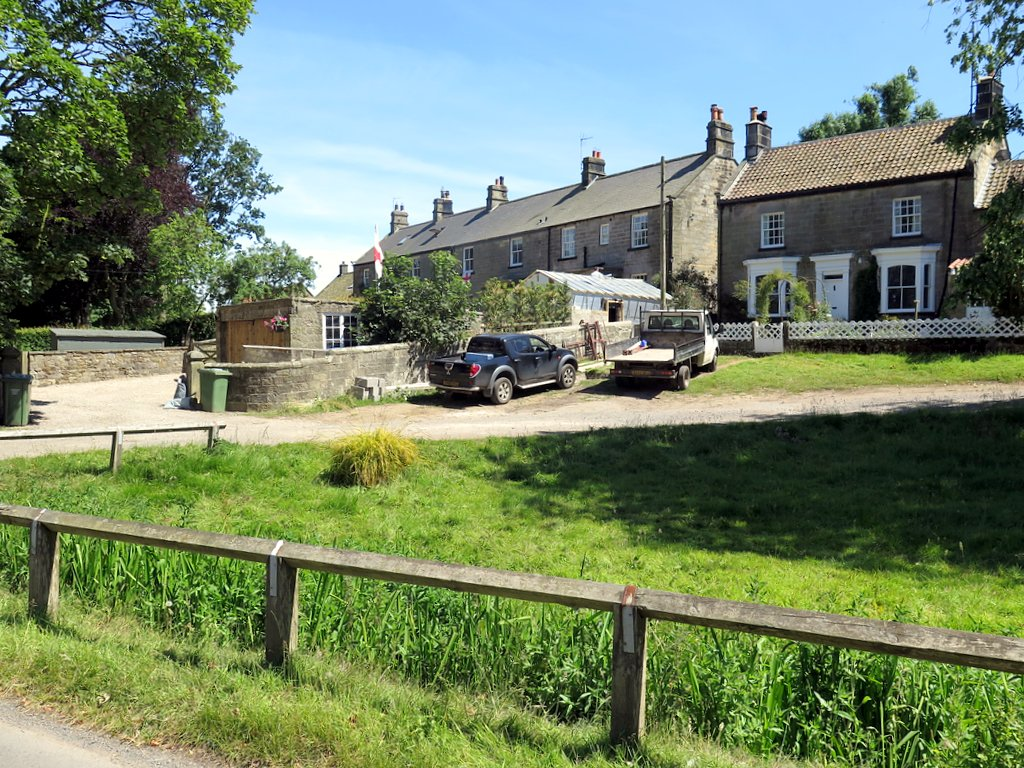
- Ainthorpe

- Location within North Yorkshire
- OS grid reference: NZ7028208063
- Unitary authority: North Yorkshire
- Ceremonial county: North Yorkshire
- Region: Yorkshire and the Humber
- Country: England
- Sovereign state: United Kingdom
- Post town: WHITBY
- Postcode district: YO21
- Police: North Yorkshire
- Fire: North Yorkshire
- Ambulance: Yorkshire
- UK Parliament: Scarborough & Whitby

Ainthorpe is a village in the civil parish of Danby in the county of North Yorkshire, England. It is situated within the North York Moors National Park in the Esk Valley, a quarter of a mile south of Danby and 12 miles (19 km) west of Whitby.

== Governance ==
The village lies within the Scarborough and Whitby Parliament constituency.

From 1974 to 2023 it was part of the Borough of Scarborough. It is now administered by the unitary North Yorkshire Council.

The village is part of the Danby Parish Group, which includes Castleton, Westerdale, Fryup and Houlsyke.

== Community ==
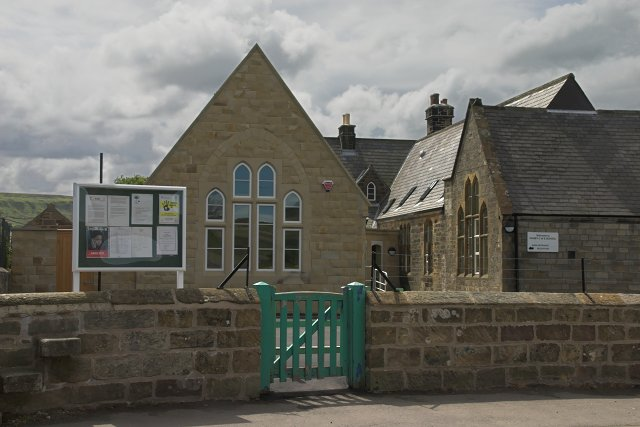
Danby School in Ainthorpe Lane

The village hosts the Danby Church of England (VC) school, located on Ainthorpe Lane. Built by William Butterfield in 1860, it is a Grade II listed building.

There is a 16th-century hotel, the Fox & Hounds Inn, in the village.

== See also ==
- Listed buildings in Danby, North Yorkshire
