= Glaisdale =

Village and civil parish in North Yorkshire, England

Coordinates: 54°26′25″N 0°48′29″W

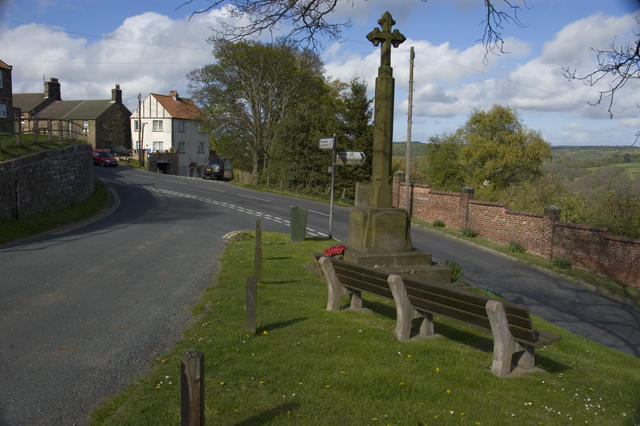
- Glaisdale War Memorial

- Location within North Yorkshire
- Population: 1,018 (2011 census)
- OS grid reference: NZ775054
- Civil parish: Glaisdale
- Unitary authority: North Yorkshire
- Ceremonial county: North Yorkshire
- Region: Yorkshire and the Humber
- Country: England
- Sovereign state: United Kingdom
- Post town: WHITBY
- Postcode district: YO21
- Dialling code: 01947
- Police: North Yorkshire
- Fire: North Yorkshire
- Ambulance: Yorkshire
- UK Parliament: Scarborough and Whitby

Glaisdale is a village and civil parish in the county of North Yorkshire, England, within the North York Moors National Park.

It lies at grid reference NZ775054 on the River Esk, between the villages of Lealholm and Egton Bridge, 8 miles (13 km) west of Whitby, and is served by Glaisdale railway station on the Esk Valley Line. The village lies on the regional walking route, the Esk Valley Walk, and on the north of England's Coast to Coast Walk.

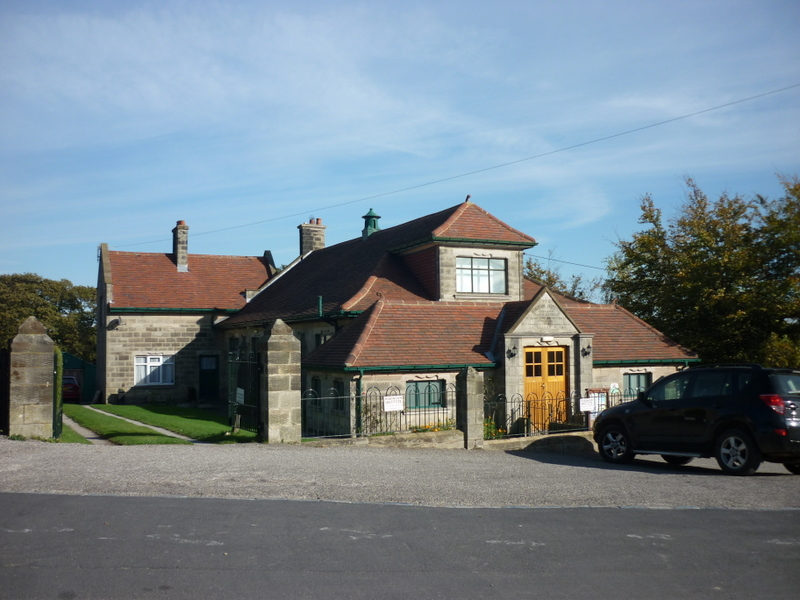
The village hall

According to the 2011 UK census, Glaisdale parish had a population of 1,018, an increase on the 2001 UK census figure of 974.

From 1974 to 2023 it was part of the Borough of Scarborough. It is now administered by the unitary North Yorkshire Council.

== Local facilities and attractions ==
=== Church ===
St Thomas' Church, Glaisdale is one of five churches within the United Benefice of Middle Esk Moor. The present church dates from 1793. An earlier "Chappell of Glaisdale", a cruciform straw-thatched building, was located on the same site: a date stone of 1585 may be seen in the side of the steps leading to the present church tower.

=== Beggar's Bridge ===
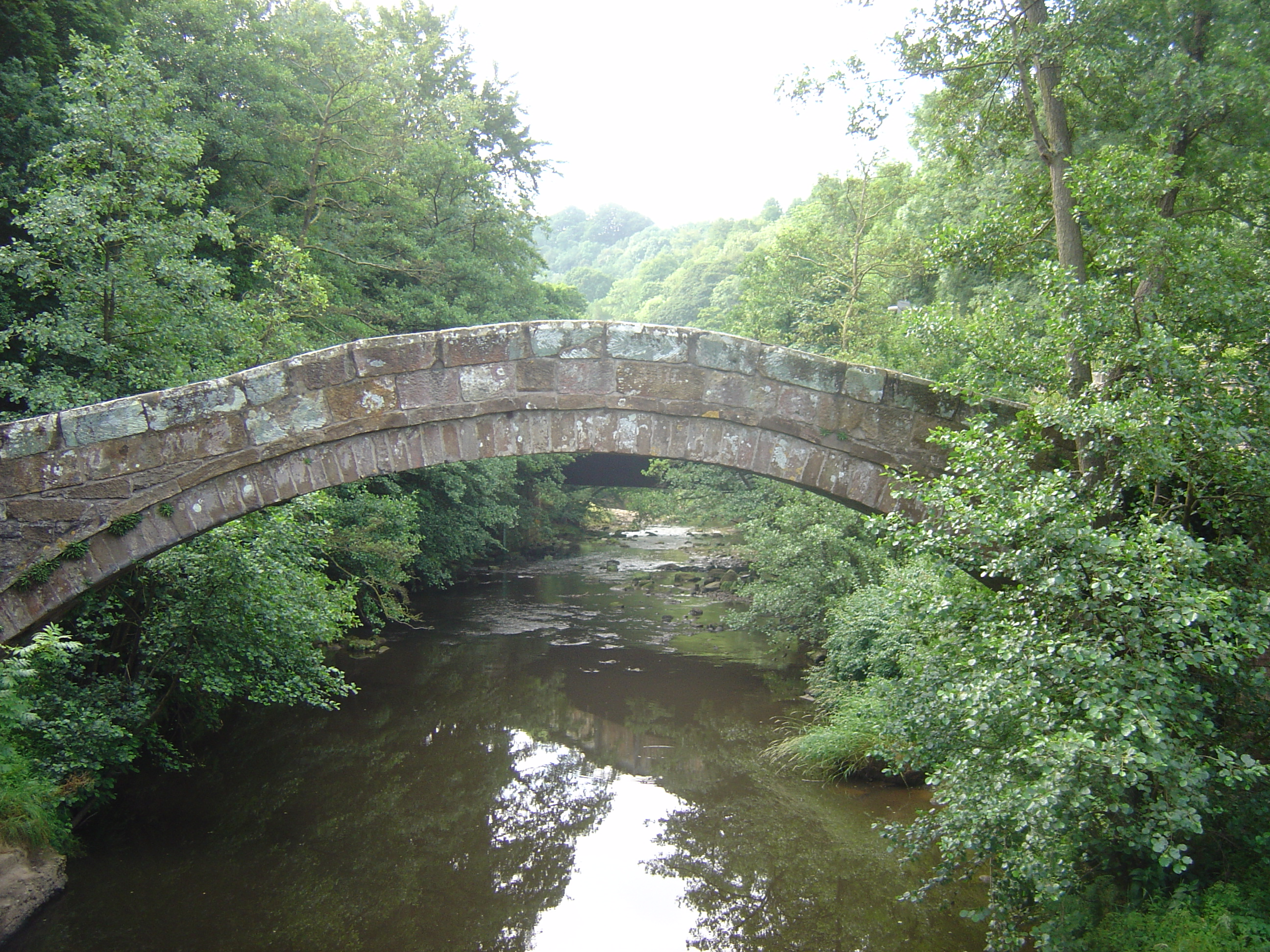
The Beggar's Bridge

East Arncliffe Wood lies on the southern bank of the Esk, between Glaisdale and Egton Bridge. On the eastern edge of the village and at the north-western entrance to the wood lies Beggar's Bridge, built by Thomas Ferris in 1619. According to local legend, Ferris was a poor man who hoped to wed the daughter of a wealthy local squire. In order to win her hand, he planned to set sail from Whitby to make his fortune. On the night that he left, the Esk was swollen with rainfall and he was unable to make a last visit to his intended. He eventually returned from his travels a rich man and, after marrying the squire's daughter, built Beggar's Bridge so that no other lovers would be separated as they were. The bridge is now Grade II* listed. The Beggar's Bridge is also a song telling the story of Tom Ferris by Vin Garbutt, recorded on his 1999 album, Word of Mouth.

== Sport ==
Glaisdale Cricket Club is situated east of the village behind the train station, adjacent to Beggars Bridge. The picturesque ground is surrounded by the River Esk on three sides. The club have three senior teams: a Saturday 1st XI that compete in the Scarborough Beckett Cricket League, two Midweek Senior XI teams in the Esk Valley Evening League, and a junior section that compete in the Derwent Valley Junior Cricket League.

== See also ==
- Listed buildings in Glaisdale
