= Yorkshire coast fishery =

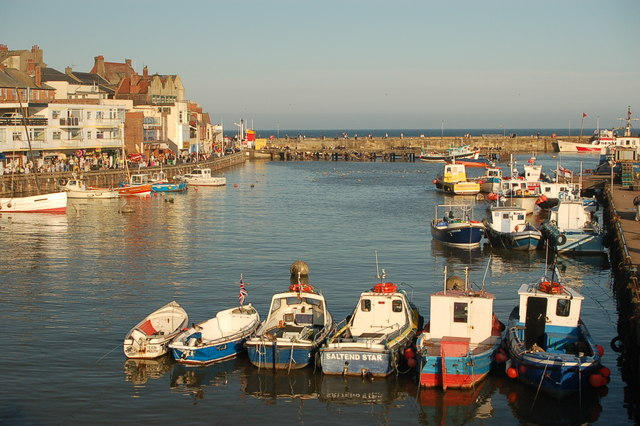
- Fishing Boats Moored in Bridlington Harbour

General characteristics
- Coastline: Yorkshire Coast
- EEZ area: United Kingdom
- Shelf area: United Kingdom
- MPA area: Runswick Bay; Holderness Inshore; Holderness Offshore
- Employment: 6,500 (2017) (Note: Official designation is Yorkshire and the Humber, so statistics will include the town of Grimsby.)
- Landing sites: Bridlington; Hull; Scarborough; Whitby
- Fisheries GDP: £16 million (2017)

The Yorkshire coast fishery has long been part of the Yorkshire economy for centuries. The 114-mile (183 km) Yorkshire Coast, from the River Tees to the Humber estuary, has many ports both small and large where the fishing trade thrives. The historic ports at Hull and Whitby are important locations for the landing and processing of fish and shellfish. Scarborough and Bridlington are also sites of commercial fishing.

The fishing industry has been in decline since the mid to late 20th century due to labour problems, fishing quotas and decommissioning schemes. Bridlington is the largest shellfish port in Europe with regular exports abroad which are mostly to European countries.

The Yorkshire and The Humber statistical region (Note: This includes areas of northern Lancashire, and excludes the Redcar and Cleveland authority and other areas) is the second largest fishing industry in the United Kingdom (after Scotland) in terms of the number of people who work in the industry.

== History ==
Up until the 1840s, the fisheries were landing catches that supplied only their immediate area; Scarborough, for example, saw an increase in its fishing fleet from 130 ships in 1840 to 800 ships in 1860. The rise in the number of boats and the increased catch, was down to the coming of the railways, which allowed fresh fish to be transported many miles inland. The transport of fish was an important business for the railways, and in 1922, the tonnages of fish transported by the railway network from the Yorkshire ports was as follows;

Station name	Tonnage	Totals	Notes
Staithes	203 tonnes (224 tons)	203 tonnes (224 tons)	Small tonnages were usually sent in vans attached to passenger trains, which were then shunted onto larger freight trains in Whitby or Scarborough
Whitby	182 tonnes (201 tons)	385 tonnes (424 tons)	
Scarborough	7,791 tonnes (8,588 tons)	8,176 tonnes (9,012 tons)	Most of the fish traffic was loaded at Gallows Close goods yard
Filey	164 tonnes (181 tons)	8,340 tonnes (9,190 tons)	
Flamborough	386 tonnes (425 tons)	8,726 tonnes (9,619 tons)	
Bridlington	310 tonnes (340 tons)	9,036 tonnes (9,960 tons)	
Hull Paragon	86,910 tonnes (95,800 tons)	95,946 tonnes (105,762 tons)	

The forwarding of fish from Hull also meant that it developed a lucrative fish market with buyers from many inland places needing their catch taken inland as it was a perishable commodity.

Some of the first experiments in deep-sea trawling were conducted off the Holderness Coast at Flamborough in the early part of the 19th century. However, until the days of large fishing trawlers in the 20th century, the most common boat in service across Yorkshire (and the north east coast) was the Coble. The design of the coble is a basic one with a short plank laid horizontally instead of a keel and a flat bottom on the boat. The flat bottom allowed the coble to be berthed almost anywhere as it did not need extensive harbour facilities; most cobles where simply hauled onto the beaches when not in use.

The coble (pronounced cobble) has been on the eastern coast of Britain for a 1,000 years and has a ribbed look (known as clinker built) where the planks, made from larch wood, overlap each other. The coble fell out of favour after the First World War as they were sail boats, and motorised fishing vessels took their place, although some cobles have had engines fitted. There are now several preservation movements dedicated to the history of the coble.

One tradition that still exists is that of the Gansey. These are woollen jumpers that fishermen wore whilst at sea to keep them warm and deflect sea spray. The tradition in the Yorkshire ports was that each one had a different design. This was practical rather than sartorial; if a body of a fisherman was washed ashore his port of origin could be easily identified.

The port of Whitby was noted as being the main port for the landing of herring. The herring fishery extended from 3 miles (4.8 km) to 7 miles (11 km) east of Whitby, though some boats went fishing as far out as 60 miles (97 km). Not all of the boats came from Whitby, or indeed from Yorkshire; fishing boats came from as far afield as Scotland, East Anglia and Cornwall. Whitby still has a traditional kipper smokehouse, though most of the herring comes from Norwegian waters. As a side venture to the herring fishery, sport fishing for tuna was carried out until the early 1950s, when the tuna stopped coming due to the overfishing of herring and mackerel.

The inherent danger of fishing at sea is borne out by the fact that between 1808 and 1970, over 400 ships were lost off the Yorkshire coast. At least 74 of these (19%) were lost due to military action during the First and Second World War's. (Note: Fishing boats as casualties of both world wars were lost by being struck by torpedoes, engaged by enemy aircraft, attacked deliberately by U-Boats, or sunk after hitting mines.) Many fishing vessels were lost after the First World War when their nets brought sea mines onto the ship; in 1919, three Hull trawlers were lost this way, similarly, three trawlers working out of Scarborough were lost in 1920, one of which went down with all hands.

Throughout the 1960s, the crab fishery on the Yorkshire coast represented 40% of the catch landed in England and Wales. Cobles landed the catch at Redcar, Staithes, Whitby, Scarborough, Filey, Flamborough and Bridlington.

The fishermen who worked out of the Port of Hull suffered during the Cod Wars of the 1960s and 1970s. Trawlermen who lost their jobs as a result of the agreement between the United Kingdom and Iceland did not receive redundancy payments, though some were entitled to compensation after an intervention by Alan Johnson MP. Fishermen working out of Hull (and Grimsby) were given incentives such as being partners in the boats they operated on which regulated supply of fish and kept the market price of the commodity stable. However, this in turn led to the smaller ports landing less fish as the buyers went to either Hull or Grimsby to obtain fish on a regular basis because of the guaranteed supply.

Due to overfishing, a European scheme to curtail the amount of fish landed led to a decommissioning scheme throughout the 1990s and into the early part of the 21st century. Fishermen and women were encouraged to scrap their boats and forfeit their licences in return for a government grant to compensate them. Money awarded to applicants fluctuated with demand and specific food fish (at times, only the whitefish boats were needed to sign up for the scheme.) In 2001, the UK Government were paying £1,684 per gross tonne of vessel.

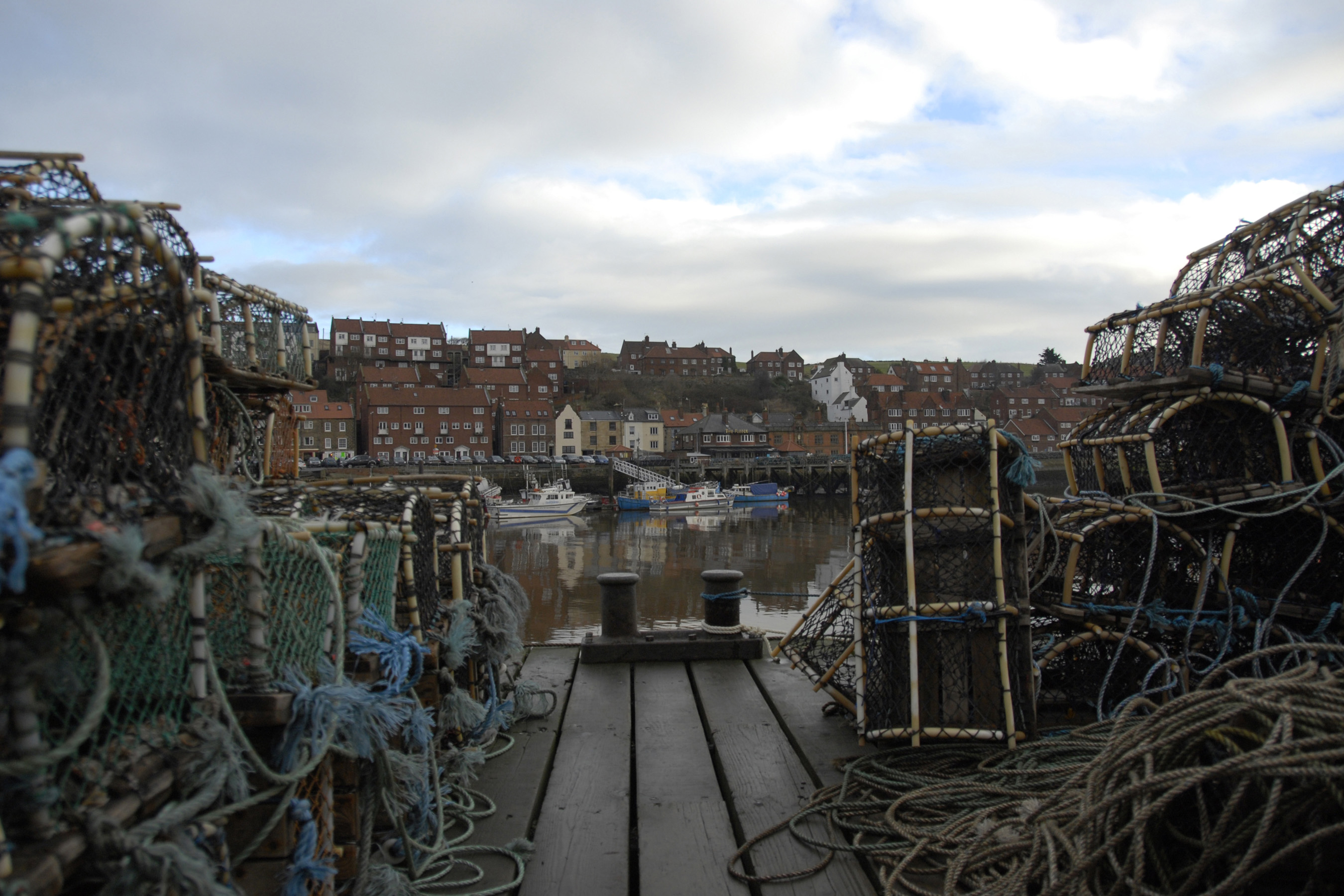
Whitby through the Lobster Pots

By the start of the 21st century, the fishing industry in Yorkshire was using five main methods of catching fish;

- Potting
- Gill netting
- Trawling
- Scallop dredging
- Intertidal netting.

On the section of the Yorkshire coast between Flamborough Head and Spurn Point (the Holderness Coast), the fishery now only lands crab and lobster.

After the public vote for Brexit, a government sponsored report stated that over 6,500 people throughout Yorkshire were directly involved in the fishing industry. This placed the Yorkshire and Humber region as second only in size to Scotland, which is the largest fishing industry sector in the United Kingdom. Additionally, the post-Brexit scenario could include fishing fleets operating from Yorkshire ports being denied the rights to fish in waters off of Norway and Iceland.

Commercially, fish is landed at only four Yorkshire ports (Bridlington, Hull, Scarborough and Whitby) though not all fish landed at these ports are from fleets registered at those ports. Additionally, the port at Whitby has suffered from a lack of investment in its infrastructure, so much so, that some fishing boats registered at Whitby travel to the dock at North Shields, 50 miles (80 km) to the north to unload their catch. Even so, the catch landed in Yorkshire represented a value of over £16 million in 2017.

In 2021 the shellfish and lobster fishing industry suffered as a result of Brexit. Health checks, catch certificates and customs declarations were introduced by the EU at the start of 2021, which delayed deliveries resulting in European customers rejecting some UK products. The impact of the changes were described by Boris Johnson as “teething problems” exacerbated by the COVID-19 pandemic. In February 2021 the Yorkshire lobster exporter Baron Shellfish, based in Bridlington, which was Europe's largest shellfish port, ceased trading, citing difficulties exporting to the EU as a result of the Brexit withdrawal agreement.

Whitby has the only fishing school in the United Kingdom, which aims to afford training to young apprentices in the various fishing trades on offer around the coasts of Britain.

== Ports ==
During the 18th, 19th and 20th centuries, the following locations were known as having fishing boats working from them. These are listed from north to south;

Name	Extant	Fishery type	Approx no. boats	Fish landed	Period	Notes	Ref
South Gare	Yes	Small-scale	Ten	Codling, plaice, sole turbot, eels	Seasonal		
Coatham	No	Small-scale					
Redcar	Yes	Small-scale	Eleven (five full-time)	Cod, whiting, plaice, sole, turbot, crab, lobster	Year round		
Marske	Yes	Small-scale	Three (one full-time)	Crab and lobster	Year round		
Saltburn	Yes	Small-scale	One	Cod, flatfish, lobster, crab	Year round		
Skinningrove	Yes	Small-scale	Four	Whitefish, lobster, salmon, sea trout	Year round		
Staithes	Yes	Small-scale	Four	Cod, sole, plaice, codling, lobster, crab	Year round		
Port Mulgrave	Yes	Small-scale	Two	Crab, lobster	Summer only		
Runswick Bay	Yes	Small-scale	Two	Flatfish and shellfish	Year round		
Sandsend	Yes	Small-scale	Two	Crab, lobster	Spring to Autumn		
**Whitby**	Yes	Commercial	Twenty	cod, haddock, whiting, plaice, lemon sole, sole, rays, dogfish, nephrops, red mullet, saithe, sea bass, pollack, conger eel, brown crab, velvet crab, lobster, salmon, sea trout, mussel, squid	Year round	Whitby also has visiting boats from outside the Yorkshire Area	
Robin Hood's Bay	Yes	Small-scale	Five	Cod, crab, lobster	Seasonal		
**Scarborough**	Yes	Commercial	Twenty-nine	Cod, haddock, whiting, lemon sole, plaice, ray, Dover sole, codling, queen scallop, crab, lobster	Year round	Scottish vessels catching shellfish also land their catch in Scarborough	
Filey	Yes	Small-scale	Five	Cod, lobster, sea trout, sole	Year round	Fish are generally landed from autumn to spring, with lobster fished during the summer	
Flamborough	Yes	Small-scale	Six	Cod, ling, pollack, sea bass, lobster	Year round	As at Filey, the catch changes with the time of year with three boats at the North landing and three at the South landing	
**Bridlington**	Yes	Commercial	Thirty-eight	Shellfish, cod, sole, sea bass, plaice, turbot, sea trout, salmon	Year round	No boats are based in Bridlington, but nearly 40 boats land their catch there	
Barmston	No	Small-scale					
Hornsea	Yes	Small-scale	Eight	Sole, cod, whiting, crab, lobster	Year round		
Aldborough	No	Small-scale					
Tunstall and Withernsea	Yes	Small scale	Fifteen	Crab, lobster, cod	Year round	Boats also fish in Withernsea, and the two ports are interchangeable	
Patrington	No	Small-scale					
Easington	No	Small-scale					
Kilnsea, Spurn Point and Stone Creek	Yes	Small-scale	One (some seasonal)	Cod, flatfish, crab, lobster	Year round		
Paull	No	Small-scale					
**Hull**	Yes	Commercial	Eleven	Cod, haddock, crab, brown shrimp, dab, sole, plaice, flounder, eel	Year round	Whitefish is still an important industry in Hull, with most catch being landed at the port already frozen	

Those shown in bold, still land fish commercially in the 21st century.

== Detailed history of ports ==
- Coatham

The name Coatham derives from cot-ham, a sheltered homestead. It is believed that boats could rest up at Coatham when the weather was bad. Some fishing activity was engaged in here and it was a market town since 1257 compared to the tiny fishing village of Redcar. Both Redcar and Coatham are a contiguous urban area now.

- Redcar

The fishing industry at Redcar started in the early 14th century. Fishing has been mostly crab and lobster, though during the 20th century, the numbers of boats has been in decline. Line fishing for cod was also undertaken sporadically, but the fishery was largely an inshore concern and the local fishermen say that the cod gave gone further north for colder waters.

- Saltburn

Saltburn was always a low-key fishing endeavour as it was largely a new town created in the 19th century in an effort led by Henry Pease. The settlement came under the Parish of Marske and was developed as a new resort in the 1860s, therefore it does not have the same centuries-old fishing histories such as Redcar, Whitby or Robin Hood's Bay. It still has a small-scale fishing operation.

- Skinningrove

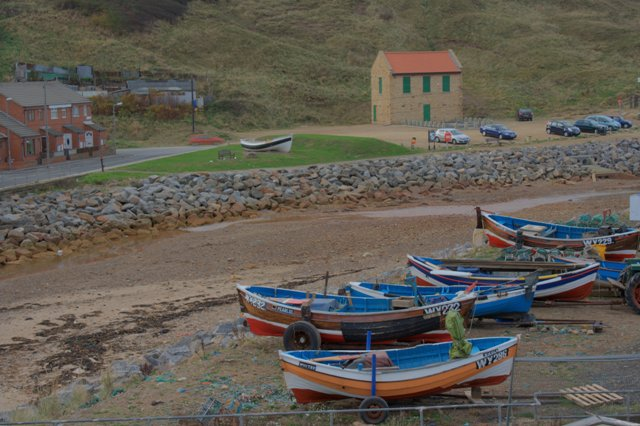
Yorkshire Cobbles at Skinningrove

Skiningrove had been an important fishing centre since Medieval times. The arrival of the ironstone industry in the village, and along the Cleveland coast, led to many fishermen abandoning their boats for work in the mines.

- Staithes

The fishermen who worked out of Staithes used line fishing and would not fish on Sundays for religious reasons. In the 1860s when large trawler fleets from Scarborough, Hull and France threatened fish stocks, many fishermen took jobs in the steel and mining industries. By the end of the 19th century, almost of the population of the village relied on the fishing industry. At least forty-two cobles and fourteen smacks were listed as fishing from Staithes in the 1890s. By the 1950s, only three boats were working out of Staithes. Government incentives persuaded people to go out fishing again, and by 1972, Staithes was listed as being the tenth highest port for the tonnage of lobster it was landing.

- Port Mulgrave

The port here was not built until 1857 and was initially used to export ironstone from Grinkle Mine to smelters on the River Tyne. It still supports a small number of fishing cobles who fish for lobster and crab mostly. Part of the dynamiting of the coast to the north was undertaken to allow ships to sail right up to the cliff edge to load ironstone. This has created tanks with seawater in that were used by fishermen to store live lobsters. The fishing is seasonal and typically has less than six boats working from the harbour.

- Runswick Bay

Runswick Bay was a "traditional, ancient fishing village", though the village is now known as a tourist destination and a location for collecting fossils. Some sea-fishing takes place from here, but in smaller numbers than back in the 18th and 19th centuries, when the village had around 20 cobles sailing from the harbour.

- Whitby

Accounts of Whitby maintained by the monks at Whitby Abbey show that the port was trading in fish as far back as 1394. However, in the 12th century, the Abbott in charge at Whitby Abbey was in a dispute with the prior of Bridlington regarding the tithes being applied to the fishermen along the coast.

Whilst strictly not fishing for food, the significance of the port of Whitby as a whaling centre cannot be ignored. Oil and fat from whales had many uses before synthetic and natural substances came available. However, whale oil and fat were usually imported into Britain from countries that the British were quite often engaged in open warfare with at that time, such as France and Spain.

Given the long time dedicated to food fishing, the whaling industry had a short time span. The first ships left Whitby in 1752, whereas the last whaling ship set sail from Whitby for Greenland (where the whaling seas were to be found) in 1837. During this time, Whitby is said to have dispatched over 25,000 seals and 2,761 whales.

Whitby is now one of two ports along the Yorkshire coast to have a seafood processing plant.

In 2016, the catch landed at Whitby totalled 715 tonnes (788 tons) with a value of £2.1 million, but was home to just one trawler, with most fishing being close to shore for crustaceans; in the 1990s, Whitby had 25 trawlers registered to her harbour. The 2021 Census figures show 59 people within Whitby employed in the "Fishing and aquaculture" industry.

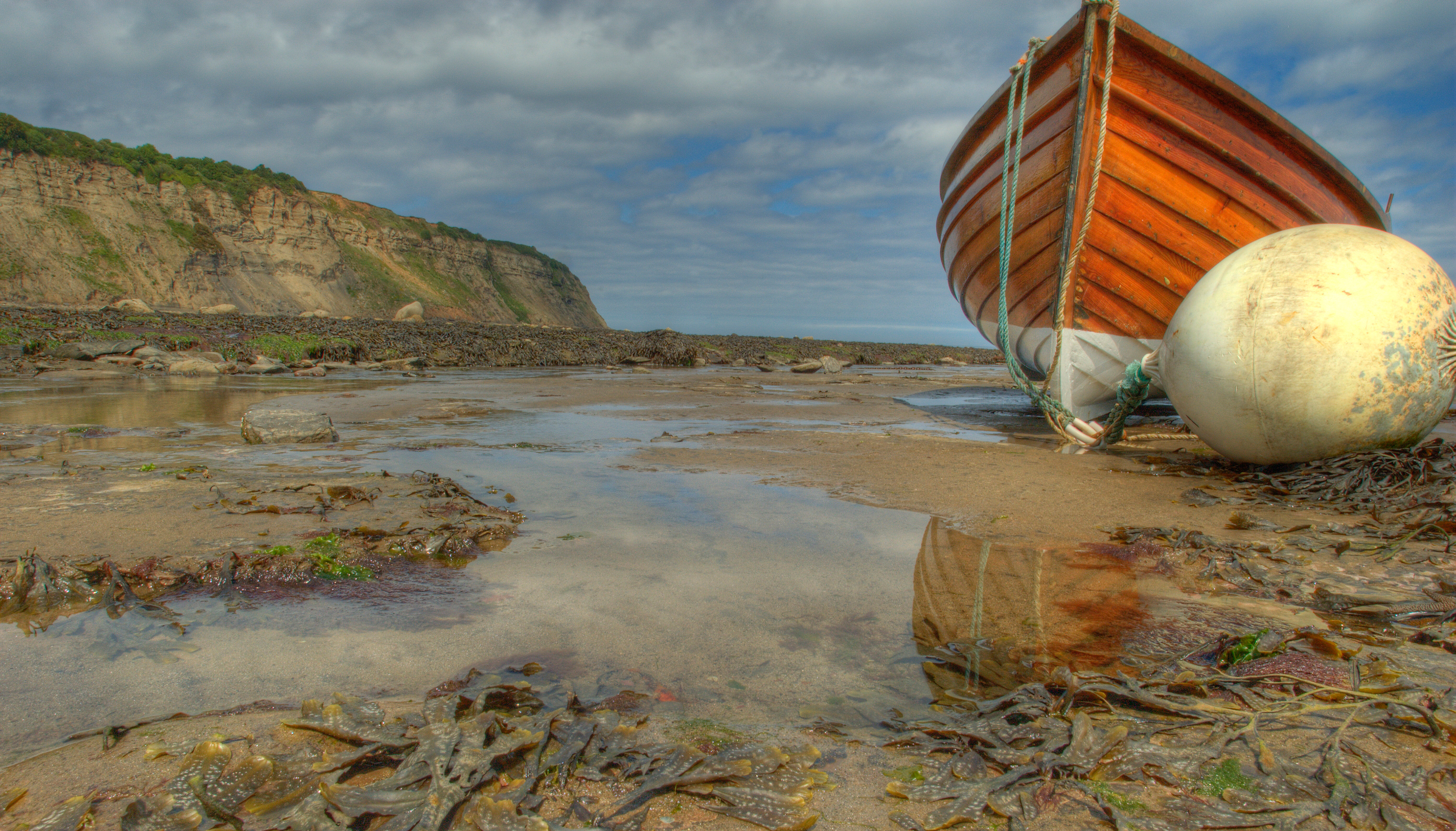
Robin Hood's Bay Whitby North Yorkshire Fishing Beach

A third type of fishing at Whitby occurred slightly inland, but involved the catching of sea going fish. Traps were set along the River Esk, even as far upstream as Ruswarp, so that salmon and sea tout could be caught. This practice is recorded as far back as 1200.

- Robin Hood's Bay

In 1530, Robin Hood's Bay was referred to as a "Fisher townlet of twenty boats". At that time, it was known to be an important fishing location, with some attaching a greater importance to Robin Hood's Bay than Whitby during the 16th century. Records show that the catch landed at Robin Hood's Bay during these times was larger than at Whitby or Scarborough. Smuggling overtook fishing as the main industry in the village by the 18th century; this has been attributed to its relative isolation as it was surrounded on three sides by marshy moorland. Even so, in 1816, Whitby had nine fishermen and three fishmongers, Scarborough had three large fishing boats, whereas Robin Hood's Bay had 35 cables and over 130 fishermen.

- Scarborough

In 1252, an edict passed by Henry III dictated the levies taxed against boats entering Scarborough Harbour. Thus was between four and sixpence for fishermen depending on the size of the boat. Fish land at Scarborough included cod, halibut, ling, turbot, skate, lobster, crab, shrimp, mackerel, sole, dab, plaice, herring, gurnard Whiting, coalfish and haddock. But by far the greatest importance was placed upon the herring. It was such a great part of the fishing economy despite the season only lasting for August and September. However, the landings were good; in the 1870s, this amounted to such a large tonnage that an express fish train to London left Scarborough daily.

- Filey

Exports from Filey were historically greater than that of Hull; it was only down to the latter's railway and dock expansion that its exports overtook those of Filey. Of particular importance were skate wings and other dried fish which were in demand in Portugal especially, but also in France.

As in most fishing villages, the women folk of Filey were involved in the fishing industry. Known as Flither Girls, women would scour the coastline looking for limpets which the fishermen would use as bait for catching fish such as herring. Flither is a local term for limpet. In the 1960s, eleven boats were working out of the shoreline to fish for crab and lobster. Filey has suffered a downtown in the 21st century, with many boats leaving for Scarborough to work from. The fishermen at Filey now fish only between April and August and whilst sea trout is an accepted catch, salmon must not be caught or landed.

- Flamborough

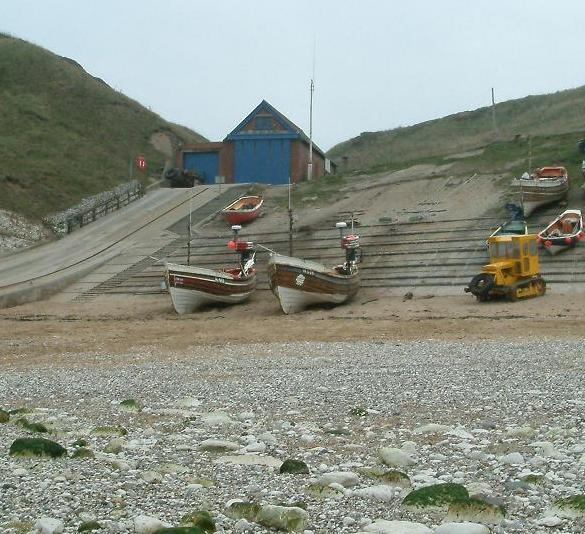
Cobles at North Landing, Flamborough. The old Flamborough North lifeboat station is in the background.

Fishing out of North Landing at Flamborough can be traced as far back as the 13th century, and like many other locations on the east coast, it utilised cobles. In the 1960s, ten boats were based out of Flamborough primarily engaged in fishing for crab and lobster. In the 21st century, this had been reduced to six boats.

- Bridlington

Holderness coast fishing stats in 2010

Fishing from Bridlington goes back centuries, although official records detailing registered vessels only extend as far back as 1786.

Bridlington is now the leading shellfish port in Europe, landing over 420 tonnes (460 tons) in 2014, which had risen to 539 tonnes (594 tons), with a value of £1.6 million by 2018. Most of the lobsters and other shellfish landed at Bridlington are exported, mainly to France, Spain and Portugal. In 2017, work started on a lobster hatchery in the port of Bridlington for the purposes of research into the species.

In 2011, the Holderness shellfish industry was estimated to have 145 people employed across 66 boats. The value of the shellfish catch across Holderness was £6 million.

- Hornsea

Fishing in Hornsea was largely concentrated on the Mere from as early as the 13th century. However, a seaborne trade in fishing (and other goods) flourished from the 16th century onwards, with cobles being launched from the beck that drained the mere into the sea. In 2009, the fishery landed over 320 tonnes (350 tons) of mixed shellfish.

- Withernsea

Like Saltburn, Withernsea does not have a long-standing history of fishing. The landing of fish in the town was hoped to be increased when the railway arrived in Withernsea, however, the location of the town was so near to the Port of Hull, that most boats could land their catch there instead. Fishing is still continued on a small basis, which land shellfish and flatfish, with a small sideline in intertidal netting for sea-trout.

- Humber fisheries

The lost village of Ravenser Odd was noted for its herring industry as far back as 1360. Herring landed at Ravneser Odd was traded throughout Europe and attracted many fish merchants from across England to its sales.

During the 18th and 19th centuries, fishermen working out of Patrington and Paull, fished the Humber Estuary for prawns and shrimp which were then sold in the local area. Shrimp fishing was still taking place in the Humber Estuary well into the 1990s when special trawls were undertaken in the autumn months.

- Kingston upon Hull

Hull was recognised as one of the great fishing towns of the world and what one writer described as being the "vanguard of innovative developments in the industry for much of this [the 20th] century". Before the Cod Wars, Hull was the third largest port in Britain for fish landings. A much reduced trawler fleet still calls Hull home, but as the vessels they operate are up to 230 feet (70 m) in length and are true trawlers, they tend to fish in deeper waters away from the Yorkshire Coast (in the seas off the Faroe Islands, Greenland, Iceland and Norway).

== Shipbuilding ==
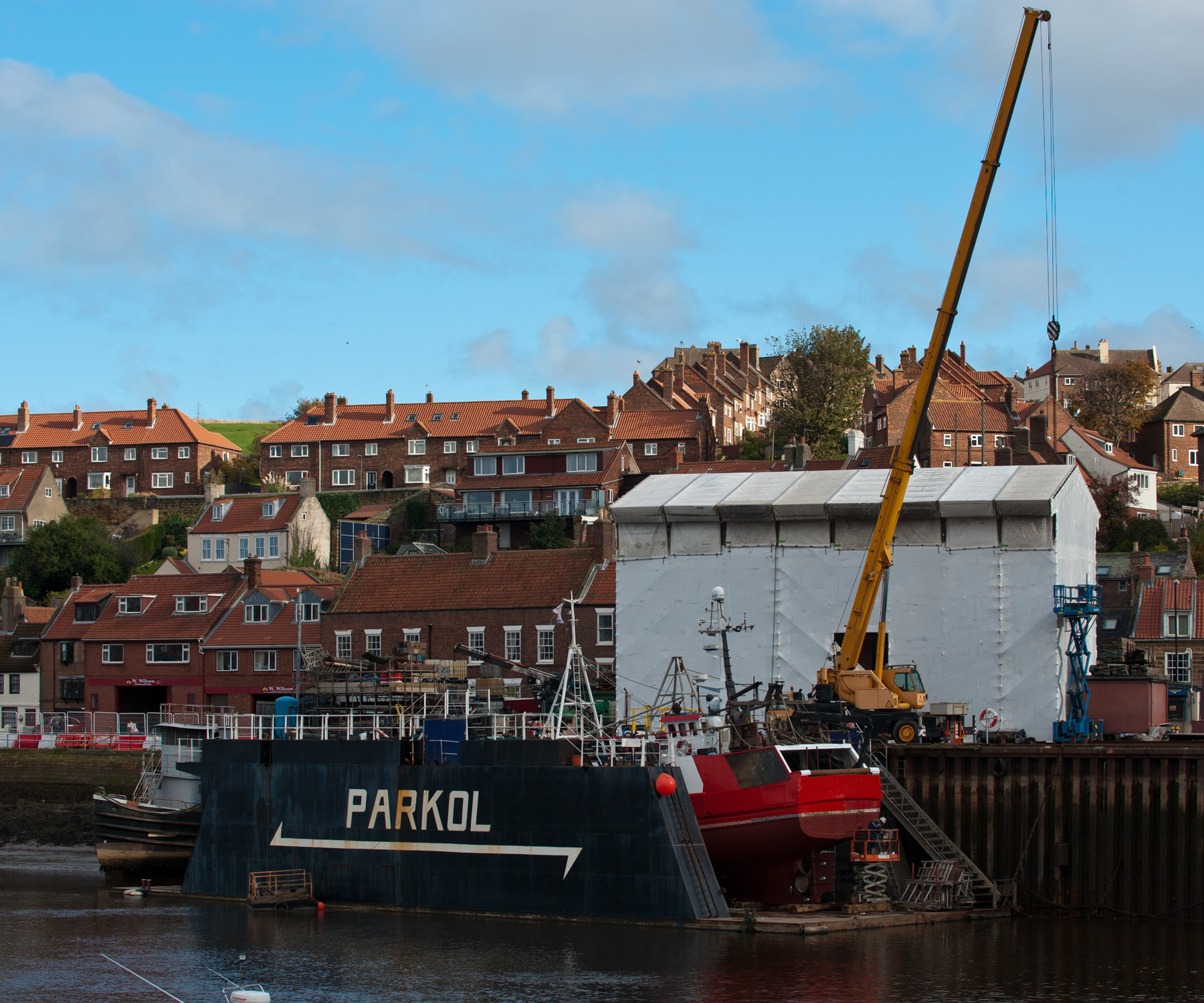
Parkol Marine shipyard, Whitby

Besides fishing, a secondary business involved shipbuilding, some of the most notable were;

- Cook, Welton & Gemmell – who had a shipbuilding yard on the River Hull at Beverley, and another on the estuary at Hull where The Deep now stands. they traded from 1883 to 1963 at Beverley, though the demand for heavier ships could not be accommodated at Beverley which was 9 miles (14 km) upstream on the River Hull.
- Cochrane Shipbuilders – founded in Selby in 1884, the yard became Cochrane's & Sons, before changing hands many times during the second half of the twentieth century. The yard was closed in 1992 and all the equipment was auctioned off in 1993.
- Tony Goodall – Goodall worked at Sandsend between 1953 and 1995 where he built cobles for the local fishing industry.
- Goole Shipbuilding and Repairing Company – built mostly larger ocean going transport vessels or ships for the Royal Navy. Also built some of the larger trawlers for use in UK waters. T. Scott & Co had a Dutch River shipyard, which was taken over by the Craggs family in 1902. In 1914 they leased a site on the Old Goole side of the Dutch River from the Aire & Calder Navigation, to which the yard moved in 1917. In November 1967 the company became a subsidiary of Swan Hunter (Small Ship Division), and was nationalised as part of British Shipbuilders on 1 September 1977. It then became Goole Shipbuilders Ltd, closed in April 1984 and was bought later that year by Cochrane Shipbuilders, whose last ship built in the yard was the tug Lady Sybil in 1987.
- Parkol Marine Engineering – one of a small number of extant shipbuilders in Britain who build fishing boats. The company are based in Whitby, with another build plant on Teesside.
- Pickersgill & Sons – based in Thornaby-on-Tees, the firm ceased boatbuilding in the 1960s.

Many more detailed descriptions are contained in the Ship and boat building in Whitby article.

== Registration of boats ==
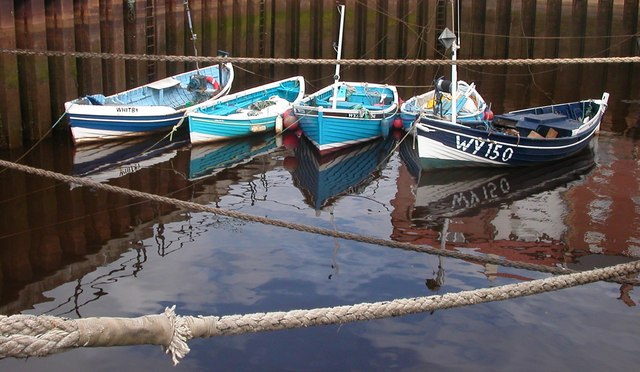
Small fishing boats in Whitby harbour. The boat on the right is WY150, a boat with a Whitby code.

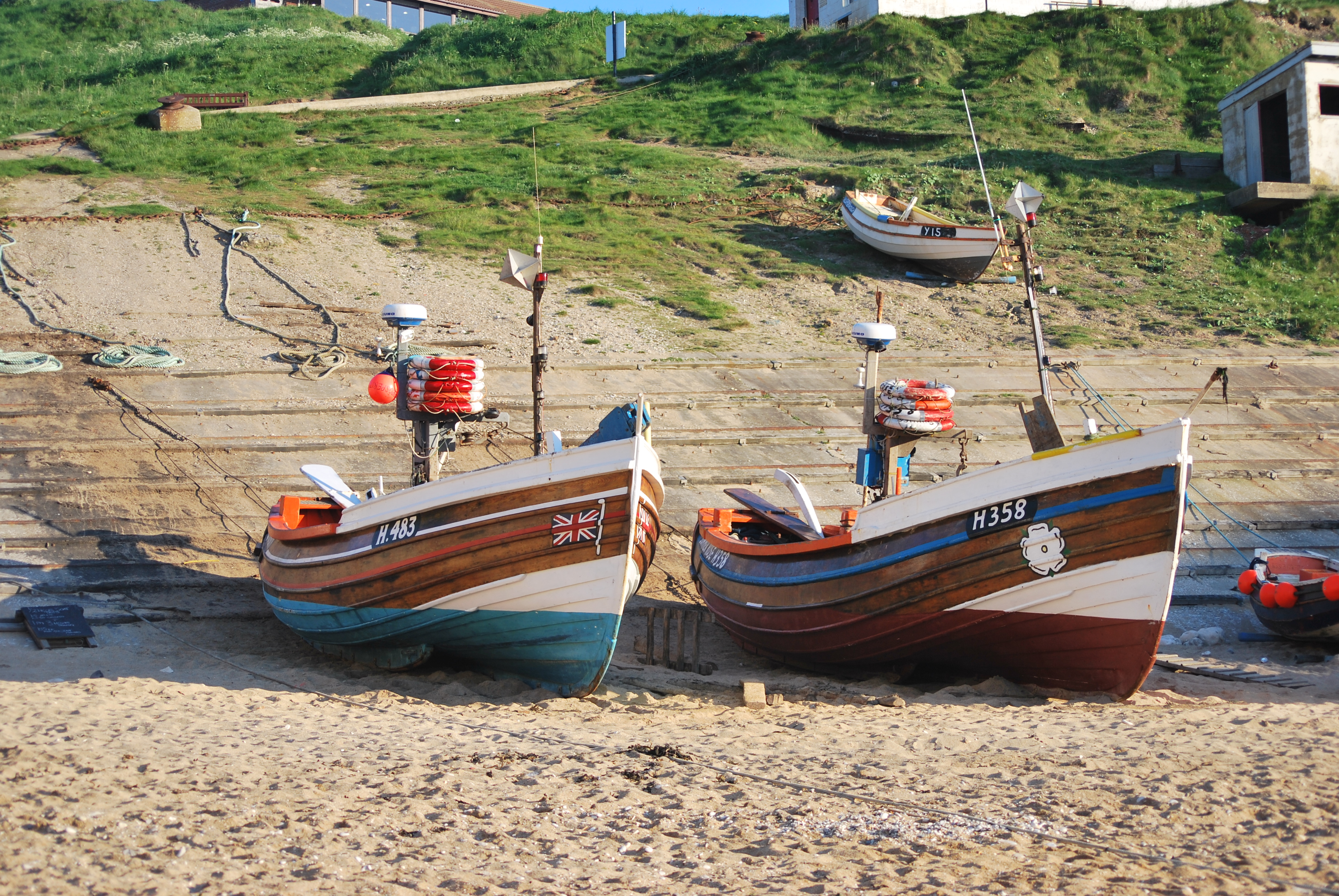
Flamborough North Landing Boats. Both boats are registered to Hull; H453 is called Prosperity, and H358 is called Summer Rose. Both work out of Flamborough catching shellfish.

Boats are given registration letters for the port they are allocated to. In Yorkshire, the codes are;

- GE = Goole
- H = (Kingston upon) Hull
- MH = Middlesbrough
- SH = Scarbrough
- WY = Whitby.

Many of the boats registered to Hornsea and Withernsea have a GY code, which is for Grimsby. Some boats which are registered to one of the Yorkshire home ports, may have codes for outside the Yorkshire region, such as Stornoway or Fowey. A sample of the number of boats and their registrations for 1967 and 2020 is given below. In 2020, vessels are registered as being either under, or over 10 metres (33 ft), with the Marine Management Organisation (MMO).

Boats registered in Yorkshire based on size.
Port	> 40 ft boats 1967	< 40 ft boats 1967	> 33 ft boats 2020	< 33 ft boats 2020	Notes
Redcar	3	0	27	0	All 2020 boats are registered in North Shields (SN), but most have a Middlesbrough (MH) code
Staithes	5	0	4	0	All boats are registered in Scarborough, though some have been registered in Hartlepool (HL)
Whitby	14	13	28	9	Whilst Whitby has its own code (WY), all boats are registered in Scarborough
Scarborough	25	2	24	11	One boat is registered to Fleetwood
Filey	11	0	1	0	All boats are registered in Scarborough
Flamborough	10	0	4	0	All boats are registered in Scarborough
Bridlington	7	8	17	23	All boats are registered in Scarborough bar one, which is registered in Campbelltown
Hornsea	♦	♦	19	0	All boats are registered in Grimsby
Withernsea	♦	♦	12	0	All boats are registered in Grimsby
Hull	♦	♦	0	10	Whilst Hull has its own registration (H), all boats are registered in Grimsby

♦ Means that data is not available

== Culture ==
The feature film Turn of the Tide was filmed in and around Whitby and Robin Hood's Bay. The story revolves around the rivalry between two fishing families and features the Bay Hotel in Robin Hood's Bay. Disappointed by the take up for his first film, J Arthur Rank started his own distribution company to market the film properly.

Bridlington holds a sea food festival sporadically (2011, 2016, 2019), to emphasise the importance of being the largest shellfish port in Europe.

Filey is host to the Filey Fishermen's Choir who trace their origins back to 1823.

In May 2019, Whitby held its first Fish & Ships festival which celebrated the stories and history of fishing at sea.

== Museums and historical ==
Starting in 1989, every January or February, there is a Lost Trawlermen's Memorial Day held at St Andrew's Dock in Hull. The service remembers the 6,000 men who died at sea whilst engaged in fishing. The number of dead only accounts for those lost at sea who sailed from Hull and the time of year is intended as that was hen most ships were lost.

- The Arctic Corsair – a floating museum on the River Hull in Kingston upon Hull. The Arctic Corsair was traditionally a side winder trawler that was active during the Cod Wars.
- Bridlington Maritime Trail – a walk around the harbour and south side of Bridlington
- Hull Fish Trail – a walk around Hull with 41 sculptures of life sized fish.
- The Viola – a trawler built in Beverley and used in the North Sea fishing fleet from Hull until requisitioned by the Royal Navy in the First World War. She is in a derelict condition at Grytviken on South Georgia, although efforts continue to return the vessel to Hull as a permanent showpiece.

== Accidents and incidents ==
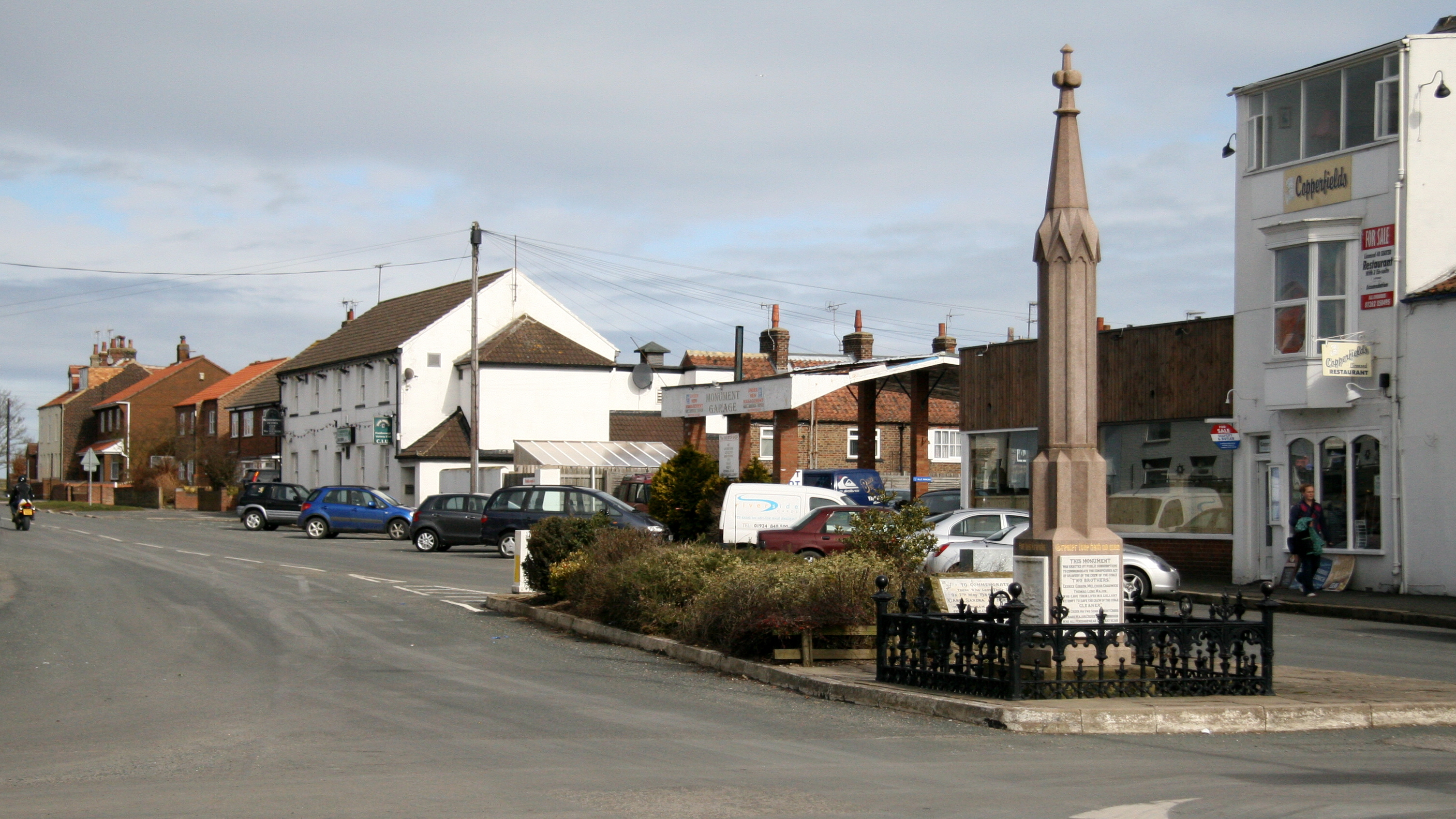
Chapel Street and the Fishermans Memorial in Flamborough

- 5 February 1909 – A fleet of 40 or 50 cobles were fishing in the bay off the North Landing when a gale "whipped the sea up into mountainous waves". The three occupants of one boat, Gleaner, found themselves washed overboard and another boat the Two Brothers, stopped to help the stricken men. The one boat with six men was then upturned by another rogue wave and all six drowned within sight of the shore and beyond the reach of the lifeboat. A memorial was later installed in the village to commemorate the dead.
- 9 January 1935 – The trawler, The Edgar Wallace, was coming into port at St Andrews Dock in Hull, when it hit a sandbank and capsized. Water rushed into the cabins and 15 members of her crew drowned, with the three survivors swept overboard, but being rescued by passing ships.
- 25–26 January 1955 – the trawlers Lorella and Rodrigo were in a safe haven off Iceland, sitting out a ferocious storm. Another trawler, the Kingston Garnet, was nearby with her propeller fast on some wire in the sea. Both the Lorella and the Rodrigo left what was described as "[a] comfy place, but they went back into that living hell to try and save those guys." Both ships foundered when ocean spray froze instantly on the rigging, normally 0.5 inches (13 mm) thick, but swelling to 7 inches (180 mm) thick with the frozen water. Both ships rolled over and up until the last minute, they were still radioing what was happening. 40 men lost their lives in the sinking; no bodies were found. Both ships were lost 90 nautical miles (170 km; 100 mi) off of Icelands' North East Cape.
- Arctic Viking (1961)
- Hull triple trawler tragedy (1968)
- FV Gaul (1974)
- October 1976 – The trawler Admiral Von Tromp set out from the port of Scarborough with her destination being the Barnacle Banks some 45 nautical miles (83 km; 52 mi) north east of Scarborough. Somehow she ended up stranded on Saltwick Nab some 90 degrees off course. the man at the wheel and one other deckhand drowned that night, the others were rescued by the Whitby Lifeboat or washed ashore. At the inquest into the sinking, a nautical expert claimed that even if the ship had been left to her own devices, she would not have foundered on Saltwick Nab. The inquest concluded that the wheelman had piloted the vessel onto the rocks deliberately.

== See also ==
- Fishing in Cornwall
- Big-game tunny fishing off Scarborough
- Whitby Seafoods Ltd
- Yorkshire Coast
