= Penny Hedge =

Ancient tradition in Whitby, North Yorkshire

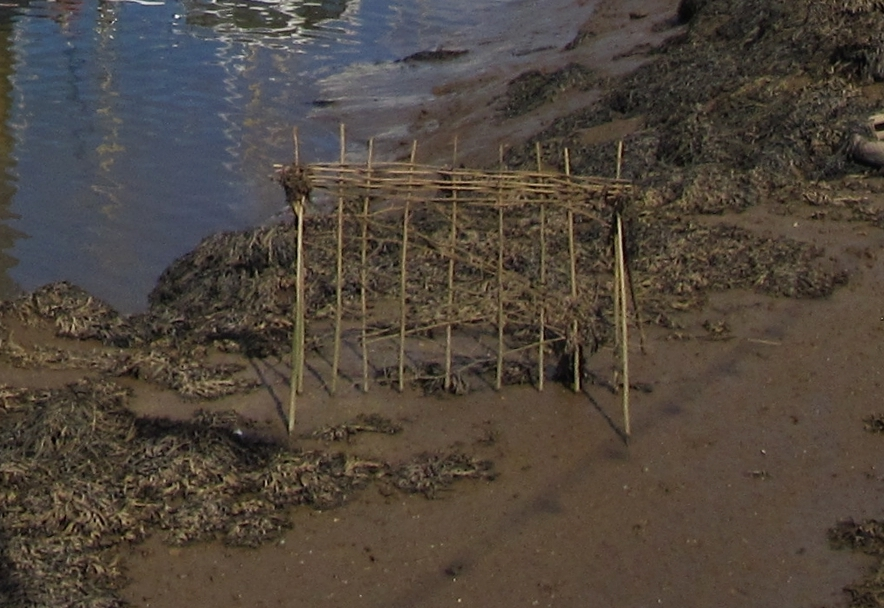
Whitby's Penny Hedge

The Penny Hedge is an ancient tradition in the English coastal town of Whitby in Yorkshire.

The legend dates back to 1159, when the Abbot of Whitby imposed a penance on three hunters, and on their descendants for all time, for murdering a hermit at Eskdale.

The hunters were following a wild boar near Whitby. When the boar took refuge in a hermitage at Eskdale, the nobles set upon the monk living there, who had closed the door on the hounds. Before he died, the monk consented to forgive them and spare their lives if they and their descendants would enact a penance.

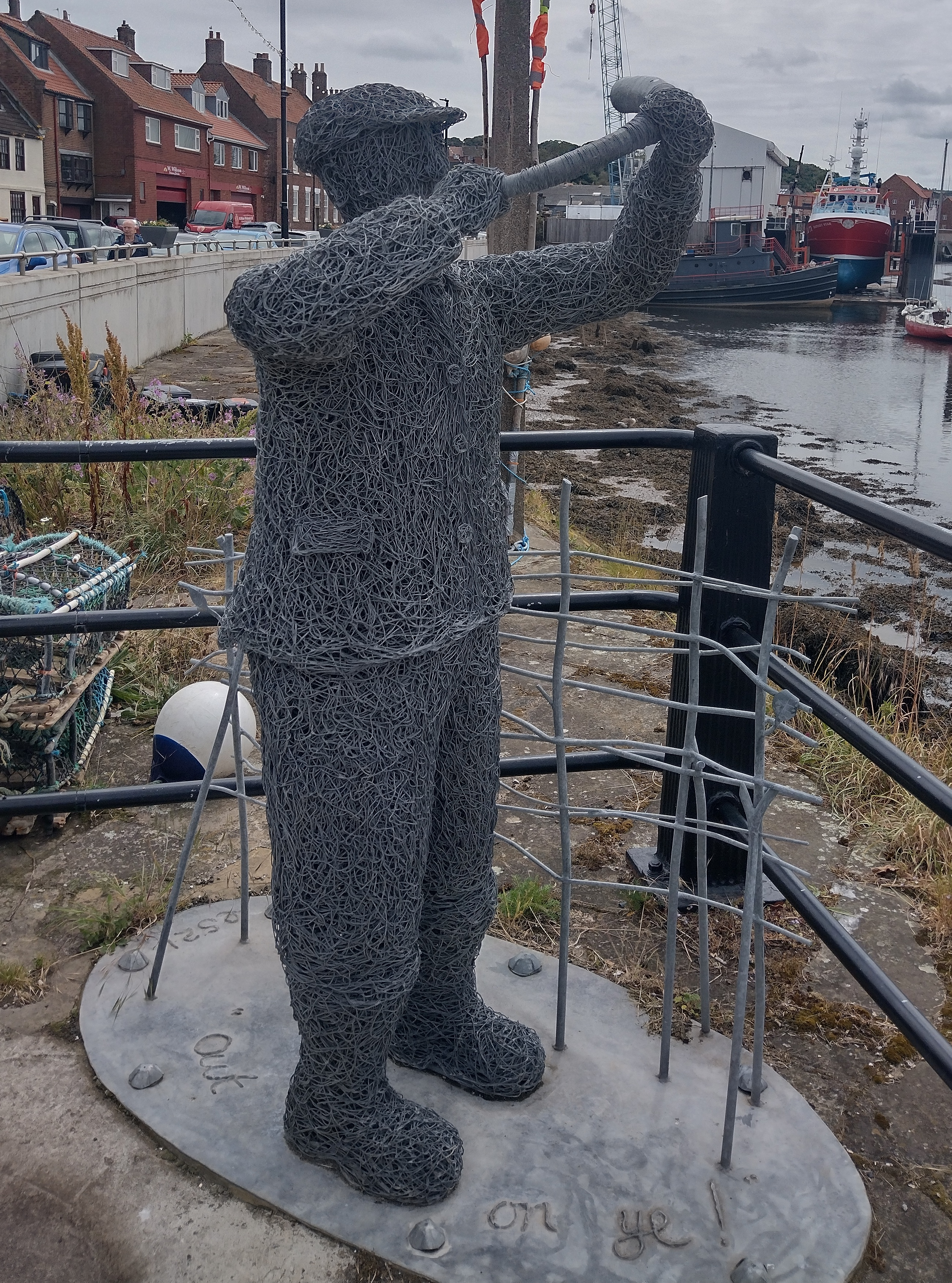
Wire sculpture of a Penny Hedge being constructed, by Emma Stothard, in Whitby.

Each year, on the eve of Ascension Day, on the east bank of the River Esk in Whitby, they had to construct a short hedge from stakes woven together, able to withstand three tides. The instructions stipulated that a knife "of a penny price" was to be used.

The ceremony is still performed in Whitby every year on Ascension Eve, by the occupiers of the land formerly owned by the Abbot. A horn is sounded and followed by the cry "Out on ye! Out on ye! Out on ye!" or "Out on ye - for the heinous crime on ye". The date of the ceremony on Ascension Eve, has been taken as being 38 days from Easter Sunday. With this, it was easy to predict that the tides would be low by 9:00 am each morning as Easter Sunday is decided and regulated by the moon and the moon dictates the tides also. However, in its 858 year history, the ceremony could not be completed in 1981, due to the tide being too high, and in 2020 due to Covid-19. Apart from 1981 and 2020, the ceremony has been carried out each year (according to available documents).

The tradition is said to have dated back to a ritual known as Horngarth. This was a requirement of tenants to maintain the hedges that divided their lands, otherwise they would forfeit them to the Abbot of Whitby. The folk-tale about the death of the hermit, has led many writers and historians to believe this was just a story attached to the tradition of the upkeep of hedges and hedgerows.

== In literature ==
The Penny Hedge legend is a major plot point in the children's book The Whitby Child by Robin Jarvis.
