= River Esk, North Yorkshire =

River in North Yorkshire, England

River Esk
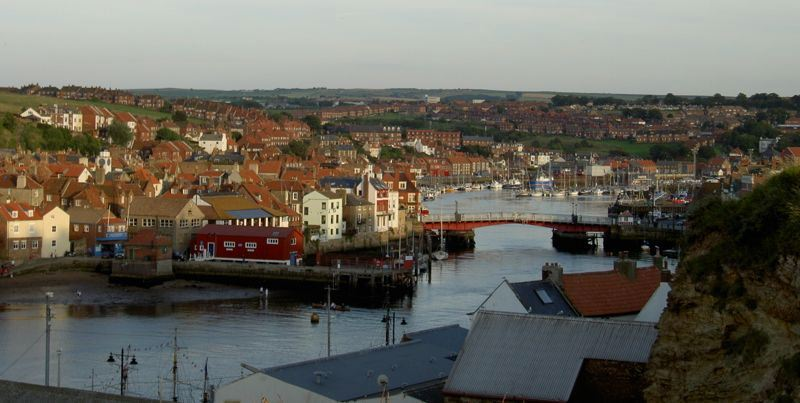
- River Esk near its mouth at Whitby

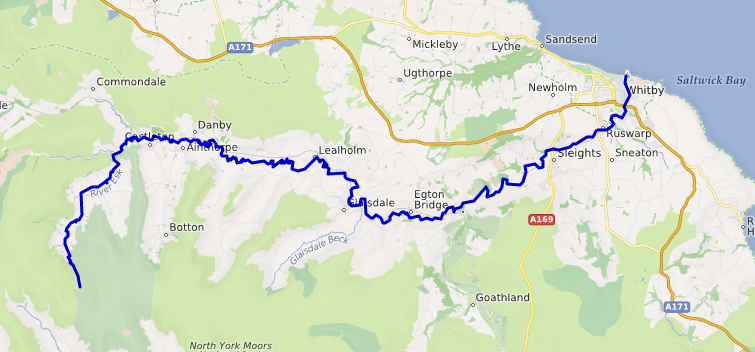
- Course of the Esk

Location
- Country: England
- Counties: North Yorkshire
- Towns: Whitby

Physical characteristics
- Source
  - location: The Esklets near Westerdale
  - coordinates: 54.3990°N 0.9779°W
  - elevation: 340 m (1,120 ft)
- Mouth
  - location: North Sea at Whitby
  - coordinates: 54.4925°N 0.6122°W
- Length: 45 km (28 mi)
- Basin size: 362 km^{2} (140 sq mi)
- Discharge
  - location: Sleights
  - average: 4.8 m^{3}/s (170 cu ft/s)
  - maximum: 350 m^{3}/s (12,000 cu ft/s)

Location of Source and Whitby within North Yorkshire

The River Esk is a river in North Yorkshire, England that empties into the North Sea at Whitby after a course of around 28 miles (45 km) through Eskdale. The name of the river is derived from the Brythonic word 'isca' meaning 'water'. The Esk is the only major river in Yorkshire that flows direct into the North Sea; all other watercourses defined as being major rivers by the Environment Agency flow into the North Sea via the River Tees or the Humber Estuary.

== Overview ==
Owing to its rural nature, the river is clean and healthy, supporting a wealth of wildlife. Salmon spawn right up through Eskdale and a number of leaps are provided to enable them to travel through weirs on the course. There are clearly visible examples at Ruswarp, where the tidal stretch through to Whitby begins, and at Sleights. Around Whitby the Esk has a large population of sea trout, and the river is noted for freshwater pearl mussels (the only river in Yorkshire to have them), although they are threatened with extinction owing to buildups of silt in the river. In 2021 conservationists moved the mussel colony into a specialist facility to encourage them to release their young, which can be raised in a secure safe environment, before the mussels are then all put back. The Esk is also the only major river in Yorkshire to drain direct into the North Sea.

The river rises at the Esklets on Westerdale Moor in the North York Moors. The Esklets are actually three moorland streams that combine in Westerdale to form the River Esk. The river flows through Westerdale before merging with a large number of becks from the surrounding hills, including Tower, Baysdale, Sleddale, Danby, Great Fryup, Stonegate, Glaisdale and Murk Esk. Running east through Eskdale it leaves the moors via the villages of Sleights and Ruswarp, between which it forms the boundary of the North York Moors, and reaches the North Sea three miles later by bisecting the resort of Whitby.

Partway down the river at Danby Bridge there is a ford in which vehicles can get trapped.

Between the junction of Fryup Dale and Lealholm the river passes through a narrow, steep-sided and wooded valley known as Crunkly Ghyll. Here the river drops 100 feet (30 m) from the valley above to reach the village. Crunkly Ghyll was formed during the last great ice age as a huge wall of ice moved across the landscape carving out what is now the Esk Valley as far as Lealholm. At its head it formed a massive dam blocking the flow of water from above and creating a lake running back up the valley to Commondale. As the ice melted, the river forced its way out, carving the ravine we see today. In Victorian times the ghyll was home to a large rockery garden, open to the public, but long since washed away by flooding of the river.

The small villages along the river were at one time of great importance to the north-east, with coal mined in the valleys and iron ore dug from quarries on the surrounding moors. Today all that remains are the deserted mine shafts, though potash is mined near Boulby, with tunnels running six miles beneath the sea, some of the deepest in Europe.

Of the major rivers in Yorkshire (as defined by the Environment Agency), the Esk is the only one to flow into the North Sea direct without flowing into either the River Tees or the Humber Estuary.

== River Esk Tideway Byelaw 1987 ==
Since 1987 a byelaw has been in place to protect dangerously dwindling populations of salmon and sea trout. The River Esk Tideway Byelaw 1987, prevents fishing for salmon and sea trout along the stretch of the Esk between Ruswarp and Whitby known as the tideway. The Environment Agency enforces the byelaw under s210 and Schedule 25 of the Water Resources Act 1991. The byelaw was renewed in 1997 for 5 years, then again in 2002 for 10 years. After a peak of 924 rod-caught salmon per year in 1965, the number dropped to just 11 in 1989. This was due mainly to illegal poaching of stocks from this stretch under the guise of angling. Since the byelaw was introduced and enforced, the numbers of rod-caught salmon per year, further upstream, has increased each year (to 177 in 2010). The byelaw was due to expire in 2012, but was further extended to the end of December 2018.

== Recreation ==
The river is used for boating in the lower reaches, especially in the upper and lower harbour areas of Whitby town. The two harbour areas also function as a port for commercial shipping and for the fishing industry. Sea-fishing tours operate out to sea from the harbours at Whitby, with many marinas being located on the east bank of the river as it approaches the North Sea. Canoeing and kayaking can be enjoyed on almost any stretch of the River Esk (including its tributaries like Eller Beck), but is mostly undertaken between Houlsyke and Egton Bridge, Egton and Sleights and Ruswarp and Whitby. These are all located between two sets of weirs each.

Local rod fishing associations have access on the River Esk to almost 8 miles (13 km) of riverside fishing. Most of these stretches are on banks where there is no public access.

== Bridges ==
The River Esk has several notable and listed bridges on its stretch. From upstream to downstream they are; Beggars Bridge at Glaisdale (a high-arched packhorse bridge built in the 17th century), the Bowstring road bridge at Ruswarp, Larpool Viaduct between Ruswarp and Whitby, the A171 road bridge and the swing bridge in Whitby town.

Many of the bridges in the valley had to be rebuilt after floods in 1828, 1880 and 1930. The present bowstring bridge in Ruswarp dates from 1933 when Cleveland Bridge & Engineering Company opened up a new bridge to replace one swept away in 1930.

== Industry ==
The river was not used for shipping save for the area in and around Whitby harbour (which was notable for its whale industry and its shipbuilding). Whilst coal was mined in upper Eskdale, it was not found in sufficient quantities to be used in the alum industry; coal was trans-shipped in from Tyneside and Wearside for this. Hand in hand with the shipbuilding industry, was the ropery works that nestled around the harbour. Whitby's last official ropery was on the south side of Spital Beck. This area was also host to shipbuilding and timber processing plants, but most of this industry was defunct by the First World War.

At Boghall and Larpool, the river was diverted in 1833 to accommodate the railway between Whitby and Pickering. This area was also the location of a whale blubber rendering plant, which was said to have afflicted the town with an awful stench.

Further upstream at the tidal limit of Ruswarp, mills were placed on the weir to grind corn. The first one was constructed in 1752, with the last being used as a mill in 1962. In 2012, a hydro-electric plant was constructed on the weir to generate green energy for the local area.

Currently, Whitby is involved in the fishing industry (mostly whitefish) which is landed by its own trawler fleet. There is a commercial side to the port which deals in fertilisers, steel and potash as well as other smaller cargoes.

== Folklore ==
Every year on Ascension Eve (38 days after Easter Sunday), a ceremony is held at 9:00 am on the east side of the upper harbour, to celebrate the planting of the Penny Hedge. This stems from an old folklore tale of how in 1159, three noblemen of the area were out hunting boar in the Eskdale woods. One of the boars took refuge in a chapel and the men tried to effect entry, but an old hermit would not allow them in. They murdered him, but before he died, the hermit forgave his murderers, if every Ascensiontide, they would plant a hedge made of hazel wood in the River Esk at Whitby which could survive three tides.

The hedge needed to be cut by a penny-knife and planted as specified otherwise the men's lands would be forfeited to Whitby Abbey, and as it was a penance as part of the hermits forgiving them their crime, if they did not carry it out, they could have faced execution charges. The tradition has been carried out every year since (according to available records) apart from 1981, when the tide was already too high to build the hedge.

== Settlements ==
from source

- Westerdale
- Castleton
- Ainthorpe
- Danby
- Lealholm
- Glaisdale
- Egton Bridge
- Grosmont
- Sleights
- Aislaby
- Briggswath
- Ruswarp
- Whitby
- (flows into the North Sea)

The Esk Valley Walk runs along part of the length of the river.

== See also ==
- Ship and boat building in Whitby
- Yorkshire coast fishery
