= Spital Beck =

Watercourse in North Yorkshire, England

Spital Beck California Beck Cala Beck
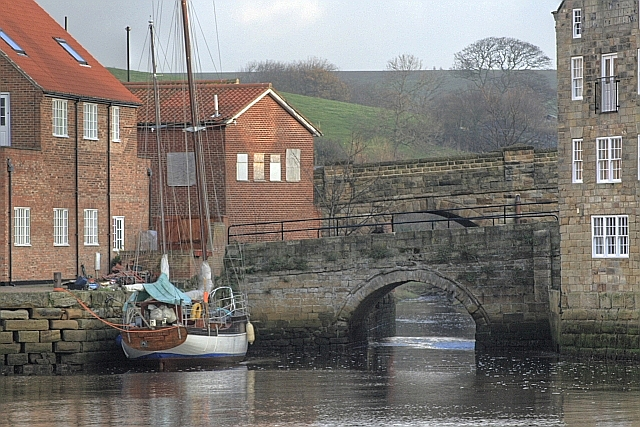
- Spital beck entering the River Esk

- Location within North Yorkshire
- Etymology: Named after a local hospital

Location
- Location: Whitby, North Yorkshire, England

Physical characteristics
- Mouth: Spital Bridge
  - location: River Esk
  - coordinates: 54.4810°N 0.6112°W

Basin features
- River system: River Esk
- Bridges: Spital Bridge
- Inland ports: Port of Whitby

Spital Beck is a small watercourse that enters the River Esk in the upper harbour at Whitby, in North Yorkshire, England. In Medieval times, the mouth of the Spital Beck was the limit of the Port of Whitby, and the beck itself in its lower reaches was associated with the shipbuilding industry. It is sometimes referred to locally as California Beck.

== Course ==
The beck has its source to the south-east of Whitby near Stainsacre, in an area which is thought to have been the site of an Iron Age settlement. The beck travels a short course of about 1.2 miles (2 km) over several waterfalls, with one, about 200 yards (180 m) upstream of the beck's mouth, revealing the layers of rock (sandstone, ironstone, sandy shale, limestone, shale, marl and calcareous shale), underneath the cascade. The steep wooded nature of the beck means that the area surrounding Spital Vale (or Spital Valley), has remained undeveloped, unlike Bagdale Beck (on the opposite side of the River Esk), which was culverted and flows underneath one of the mains roads into and out of the town. The lower reaches of the Spital Beck underneath Spital Bridge are tidal. The Spital Beck is one of three streams which enter the River Esk in its tidal reach; Cock Beck enters the river near Ruswarp, and Bagdale Beck, which is now largely culverted, enters the harbour area by the railway station in Whitby town.

The mouth of Spital Beck was notable for having the last working ropery in Whitby that was associated with the shipbuilding industry in the town. The ropery, which opened c. 1847 and was 380 yards (350 m) long, was situated on the south bank of the beck just east of Spital Bridge and lent its name to a thoroughfare that ran alongside the beck (Ropery Walk). The mouth of the beck also used to mark the limit of the Medieval Port of Whitby, but this was later extended to the high water mark in Ruswarp. Spital Beck ceased to be the limit of the lower harbour area of the Port of Whitby in 1724. Opposite the ropery, the course of the beck had been opened out to form a wide timber pond, this was later used as a mooring point for cobles. The level of the water in Spital Beck was maintained by a sluice gate between the new and old Spital Bridges. A sail loft was also present in the Spital Bridge area, manufacturing sails from canvas material.

Just before the water of Spital Beck enters the River Esk (and the upper harbour), it passes under two road bridges, the new and old Spital bridges. The old bridge is grade II listed and used to carry the local road down from Helredale (off the now A171 road) to Whitby Harbour and the swing bridge. The newer bridge, which is still in use for vehicular traffic, was built in 1876. A record of a bridge spanning Spital Beck at this site exists as far back as the 12th century.

== Etymology ==
The bridge at the mouth of the beck is first recorded as Spitalle-Brigge in 1540. The area was so named because a local hospital, run by the same monks who inhabited Whitby Abbey, was built near the mouth of the beck. The hospital, which was dedicated to St Michael, was built in 1109 by the Abbot William de Percy. The dale that the Spital Beck flows through is known as Helredale, but this fell out of use in favour of Spital Dale, and Helredale is now the area at the east end of the New Bridge in Whitby.

The timber pond in the beck at the east side of Spital Bridge was used to store wood imported from the Baltic states. It was from this area that ships would sail which were taking emigrants to America, and so the beck was also known locally as California Beck. A derivative of this lends another name to the watercourse; Cala, or Calla Beck. Another theory on the name is that during the California Gold Rush, there was much digging activity on the south side of the beck in the hope of creating gardens to grow tropical fruit, that side of the beck being in a sunny, sheltered area.

== Wildlife ==
Otters have been observed on Spital Beck as well as the River Esk. The beck used to host trout eels and minnows, but sightings tailed off in the 1970s due to silage and agricultural effluent entering the beck. Because of the tidal system which flows into the beck, it hosts a small saltmarsh ecosystem, the only one of its type on the 100-mile (160 km) stretch of coastline between Middlesbrough and Spurn Head.
