= Isabella (1827 ship) =

English merchant ship and convict transport

History

United Kingdom
- Name: Isabella
- Builder: T. Barrick
- Launched: 1827, Whitby
- Fate: Wrecked in 1841

General characteristics
- Type: Barque
- Tons burthen: 323 (bm)
- Propulsion: Sail

Isabella was a 323-ton merchant ship built in Whitby, England in 1827. She made one voyage transporting convicts in 1840 from Ireland to Australia. She was wrecked on a reef off the Caroline Islands in 1841.

== Career ==
Isabella first appeared in the Register of Shipping for 1827, with J. Brown, master, and Nelson & Co. as owner. Her trade was Weymouth to the Baltic.

Year	Master	Owner	Trade	Source
1830	Blake; Lotherington; Henderson	Nelson & Co.	London–Jamaica	LR
1835	Partridge	Nelson & Co.	London–Jamaica	LR

The entry for Isabella in Lloyd's Register for 1840, gave her master as "M'Ausland", her owner as H. Nelson, her homeport as London, and her trade as London to Sydney.

Under the command of Alexander McAusland and surgeon Henry Mahon, Isabella left Dublin, Ireland, on 5 March 1840, and arrived at Sydney on 24 July 1840, having sailed via the Cape of Good Hope. She had embarked 119 female convicts, passengers, and cargo. No convicts died on the voyage.

Isabella sailed from Sydney for Newcastle on 27 August, in ballast. She arrived back in Sydney on 6 October. On 22 December, Isabella left Port Jackson bound for Guam in ballast.

== Fate ==
While sailing to Guam, Isabella was wrecked on a reef in the Caroline Islands on 30 January 1841. The crew reached Manila safely after twenty-seven days in the boats.
