= Parkol Marine Engineering =

Engineering company in North Yorkshire, England

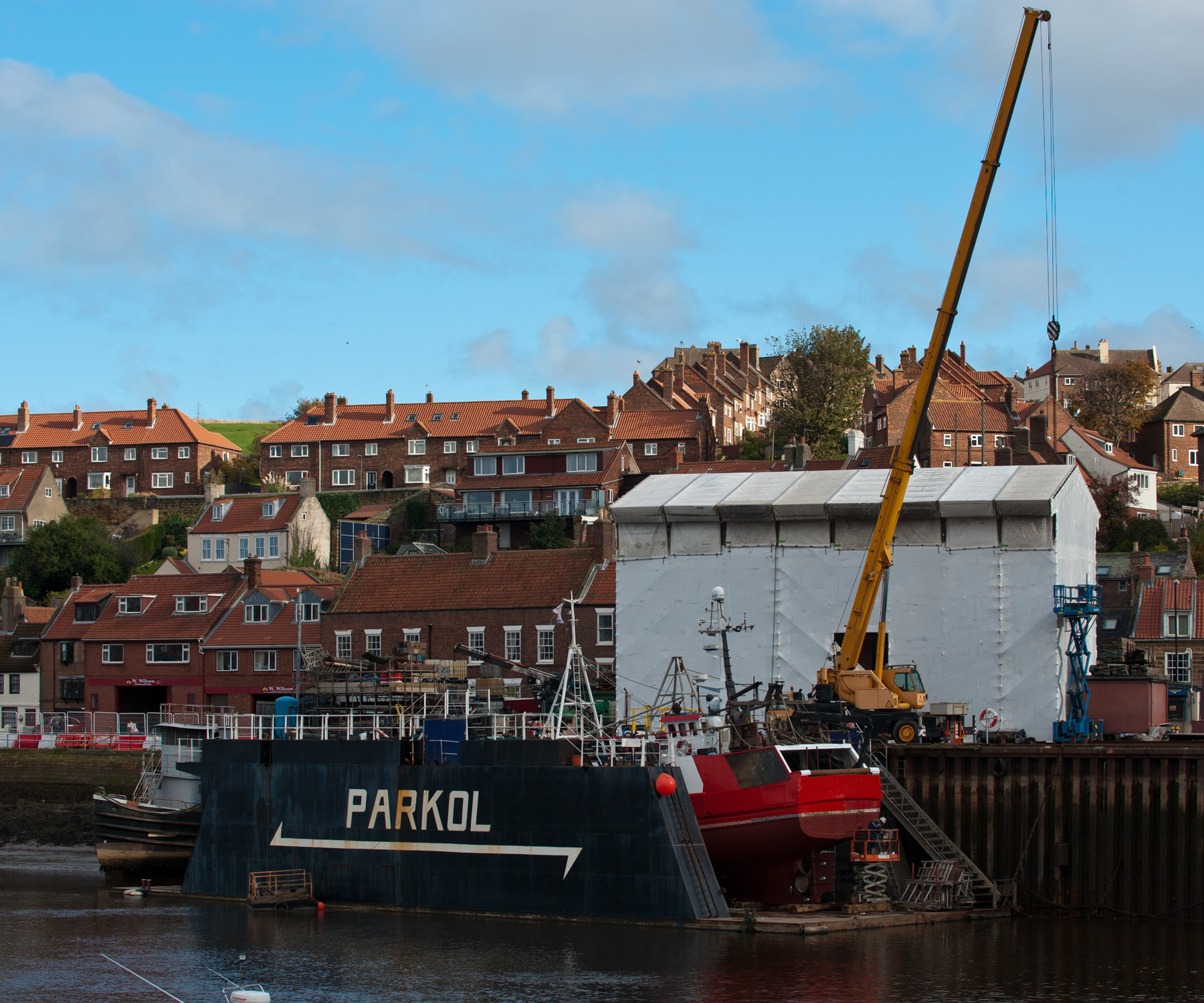
- Parkol Marine shipyard Whitby
- Industry: Shipbuilding
- Founded: 1971
- Headquarters: Whitby, England
- Number of locations: 2
- Number of employees: 70 (2020)
- Website: Official website

Parkol Marine Engineering is a shipbuilding and engineering company based in Whitby, North Yorkshire, England. The company was founded in 1971 and, since 1997, has built an average of two ships per year: orders increased, however, between 2015 and 2018, which led to the company opening a second site on Teesside.

== History ==
Originally formed in 1971, during the 1970s and 1980s the business was a marine repair yard which employed 40 people. Prior to Parkol Marine Engineering (PME) constructing boats in 1997, the last recorded boat to be built in Whitby was in the early 1970s. The Parkol company was formed by Ken Parker and John Oliver, with the new venture being a portmanteau of the first parts of their surnames. In 1997, after acquiring a dry dock from the Netherlands, Parkol Marine Engineering ventured into the boat-building business, launching a 33-foot (10 m) scalloper in 1997, though the first trawler they built was the Rebecca in 1999. Originally located at Spital Bridge in the town, they moved to a new site closer to the riverside on Church Street.

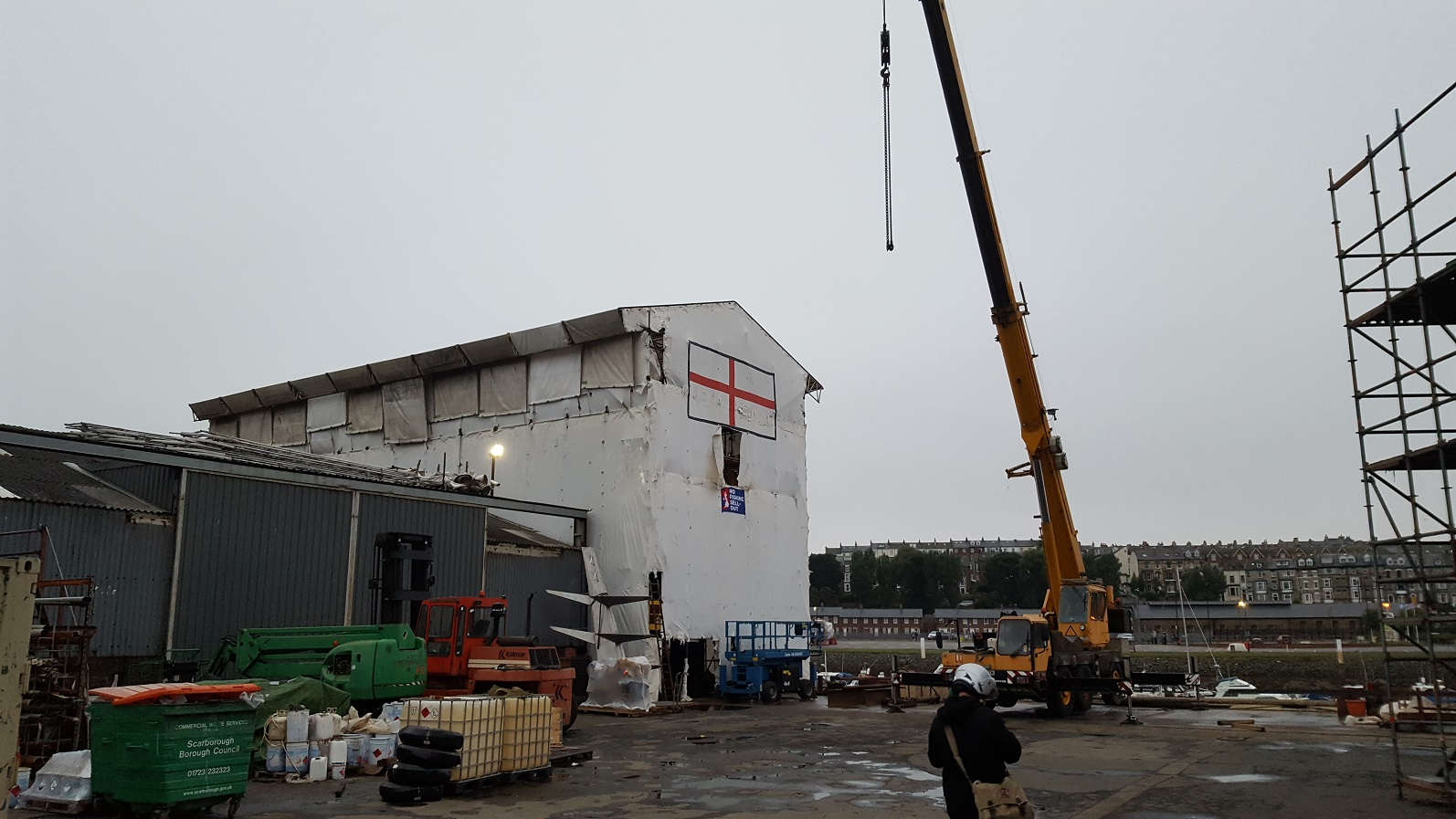
Parkol shipbuilding site on Church Street in Whitby

In their Church Street site, the company have a fabrication, shot blasting and painting hall. The yard adjoins the eastern bank of the River Esk, and has two newbuild berths for vessels up to 82 feet (25 m) long and a dry dock capable of taking vessels up to 138 feet (42 m). Every newbuild boat at Parkol Marine has been created on paper by the ship designer Ian Paton.

In 2017, Parkol opened a second site in Middlesbrough that measured 230 feet (70 m) long by 115 feet (35 m) wide and 131 feet (40 m) tall. The larger site was created so that Parkol could build bigger boats and tailor bespoke boat building to the fishing industry's needs. Combined with the site on Teesside, the company employed 80 tradesmen and staff, dropping to around 70 in 2020.

In October 2018, the first boat to be built in the new Middlesbrough site was launched officially at Whitby Harbour. The company offers a range of marine engineering services; from refurbishment and repair, to a whole newbuild ship. The yard offers ship-lengthening services. The first ship to undergo this work was the Scarborough trawler Allegiance, which was extended by 26 feet (7.9 m) at a fifth of the cost of a newbuild ship.

Parkol also undertake maintenance, and have, in the past, cleaned the Whitby Lifeboat and serviced her in less than six hours so as to keep the lifeboat availability at the best it could be. In 2002, they built a replica of Captain Cook's ship, HMS Bark Endeavour, to two-fifths of the actual size. The replica vessel (known simply as either Endeavour or The Bark Endeavour Whitby) sails up and down the coast from Whitby and is powered by a motor. The ship was constructed from wood using the skills of local tradesmen.

Parkol regularly feature in the Fishing Vessel of the Year competitions run by Fishing News: they won best vessel in 2015 and 2016. Their yard in Whitby has been featured in an episode of Kavanagh QC on ITV in 1998.

Parkol fabricate their boats on the quayside and then have a crane lift their vessels into the water, as opposed to the normal route of launching them down the slipway.

== Ships built ==
Below is a sample list of ships that Parkol Marine have built since 1997. There is not a ship with yard number 13.

Yard No.	Year	Type	Name	Gross tonnage	IMO Number	Notes	Registration Code	Yard built in	Launch date
1	1997	19.11m Scalloper	Jacqueline Anne				OB 555	Whitby	
2	1999	18.50m Trawler	Rebecca	130	8957209	Renamed Courage in January 2007	WY 790	Whitby	
3	2000	18m Trawler	Our Lass		8965476		WY 797	Whitby	
4	2001	18.77m Twin Rig Trawler	Reliant		8972716		BCK 101	Whitby	
5	2001	14.94m Trawler	Sophie Louise II				SSS 678	Whitby	
6	2002	13.37m wooden Replica	Endeavour					Whitby	
7	2002	14.95m Gill Netter	Berlewen				PW 1	Whitby	
8	2003	14.95m Vivier Crabber	Siwrengale				H 77	Whitby	
9	2004	15.95m Trawler	Emulate				WY 110	Whitby	
10	2004	14.15 m Scalloper	Harmonii				MR 7	Whitby	
11	2004	15m twin rig trawler	Rachael Jayne II				MT 100	Whitby	
12	2005	16.95m Vivier Crabber	Celtic Dawn		8996396		K 76	Whitby	
14	2005	18m Scallop Trawler	Rois Mhiari		8996384		OB 45	Whitby	
15	2005	14.95m Vivier Crabber	Ebonnie				BM 176	Whitby	
16	2006	9.80m Foyboat	Foy Boat					Whitby	
17	2006	18.77m Trawler	Copious		9395757		LK 985	Whitby	
18	2006	18.90m Trawler	Star of Jura		9095503		OB 278	Whitby	
19	2007	14.95m Vivier Crabber	Aquila				OB 74	Whitby	
20	2007	21m Trawler	Our Lass II		9095515	First vessel over 20 metres built by Parkol Marine	WY 261	Whitby	
21	2007	22.80m Trawler	Radiant Star		9453808		LK 71	Whitby	
22	2008	16.49m Twin Rig Trawler	Prolific		9548859		LK 986	Whitby	
23	2008	16.70m Vivier Potter	Noronya		9564530		K 733	Whitby	
24	2009	17.50m Twin Rig Trawler	Pleiades		9564542		BF 155	Whitby	
25	2009	16.49 m Twin Rig Trawler	Reliance II		9564566		BF 800	Whitby	
26	2009	21.67 m Twin Rig Trawler	Jubilee quest		9564554		GY 900	Whitby	
27	2010	16.49 m Twin Rig Trawler	Challenger		9564475		FR 90	Whitby	
28	2010	22.06m Twin Rig Trawler	Virtuous		9577252		FR 253	Whitby	
29	2016	26.75m Motor Yacht	Able One					Whitby	
30	2013	26m Trawler	Our Lass III		9655925		WY 261	Whitby	
31	2014	26m Trawler	Guiding Star	261	9699488		H 360	Whitby	
32	2014	27m Salmon Feed Carrier	Havilah	160	9743394			Whitby	
33	2015	26m Trawler	Guardian Angell		9747388		LK 272	Whitby	
34	2015	14.95m Vivier Crabber	La Creole II				BM 177	Whitby	
35	2016	27m Seiner/Trawler	Resilient		9781346		LK 195	Whitby	
36	2017	23.95m Prawn Tawler	Day Star		9803390		FR 86	Whitby	
37	2017	23.95m Trawler	Victory Rose	265	9810288		WY 37	Whitby	
38	2017	19m Trawler	Sparkling Star		9810317		UL 290	Whitby	
39	2018	26m Trawler	Guiding Light		9840025		H 902	Whitby	
40	2018	23.95m Trawler	Uberous		9850965		FR 50	Whitby	Launched 21/10/2018
41	2020	33m Scallop And Queenie Trawler	Alcedo		9884875	First vessel over 30 metres built by Parkol Marine	BA 77	Middlesbrough	Launched 10/01/2020
42	2018	20.30M Scallop Trawler	Summer Rose		9829291	The hull was built in Middlesbrough under subcontract by MacDonald Offshore	OB 141	Middlesbrough	
43	2019	19m Trawler	Carvela		9884746		K751	Middlesbrough	Launched 23/03/2019
44	2018	20.30m Scalloper	Atlantic Dawn		9850953	First vessel built by Parkol Marine at their Middlesbrough yard	CN 25	Middlesbrough	Launched 16/09/2018
45	2019	22.30m Twin Rig Trawler	Fruitful Bough		9858917		PD 109	Whitby	Launched 03/04/2019
46	2019	24m Trawler	Virtuous		9879650		FR 253	Whitby	Launched 14/09/2019
47	2020	27m Salmon Feed Carrier	Havara	260	9885697			Middlesbrough	Launched 10/09/2020
48	2020	16.49m Vivier Crabber	Osprey		9858931		WK 4	Whitby	Launched 06/03/2020
49	2020	20.70m Twin Rig Trawler	Reliance III	190	9898888		BF 800	Whitby	Launched 04/09/2020
50	2021	27.8m Vivier Crabber	Valhalla		N/A		FR 268	Whitby	Launched 29/09/2021
51	2021	20.40m Gillnetter	Amanda of ladram		N/A		PW 6	Whitby	Launched 17/03/2021
52	2021	27.8m Twin rig Trawler	Sparkling Star		N/A		UL 290	Middlesbrough	Launched 15/02/2022
53	2021	23m Trawler	Ambitious II'		N/A		DA 62	Middlesbrough	Launched 08/09/2021
54	2022	22.2m twin rig trawler	Day dawn		9934022		FR 90	Whitby	Launched 12/03/2022
55	2022	22m Trawler	Green isle		9963645		SO 500	Middlesbrough	Launched 5/09/2022
56	2023	21.6m Twin rig trawler	Seraphim		N/A		PD 170	Middlesbrough	Launched 29/08/2023
57	2022	25 m Trawler	Daystar II		N/A		FR 86	Whitby	Launched 16/04/2023
58	2023	27.30m beam trawler	Admiral Gordon	226	9970181		PH-330	Middlesbrough	Launched 17/03/2023
59	2022	21.4 m Crabber	Winter of Ladram	218	N/A		E 24	Whitby	Launched 12/07/2022
60	2024	27.30m beam trawler	Admiral Blake		N/A		PH 440	Middlesbrough	Launched 27/03/2024
61	2023	15m vivier crabber	Genesis		N/A		H 37	Whitby	Launched 28/10/2023
62	2024	34m scallop & queenie trawler	Halcyon		9949596	Largest vessel built by Parkol Marine	BA 72	Middlesbrough	Launched 09/01/2025
63	2023	9.80m Foyboat	Foy boat III		N/A			Whitby	Launched 07/12/2023
64	2024	24.5m survey and patrol vessel	North Eastern Guardian IV		N/A	Aluminum catamaran		Whitby	Launched 08/05/2025
65	2024	27.30m beam trawler	Admiral Ramsay		N/A		PH-220	Middlesbrough	Launched 30/06/2025
66	2024	15m whelker	Ted of Ladram		N/A		E7	Whitby	Launched 10/05/2025
67	2026	28m stern trawler	Our Lass	N/A	N/A	Being built at Middlesbrough yard	WY 261	Middlesbrough	In active build
68	2024	9.80m Foyboat	Foyboat V		N/A		N/A	Whitby	Launched 06/08/2024
69	2026	28m stern trawler	N/A	N/A	N/A	Being built at Middlesbrough yard	N/A	Middlesbrough	In active build
70	2026	26m Ro-Ro Ferry	N/A	N/A	N/A	Being built at Whitby yard (New ferry for Fair Isle Shetland)	N/A	Whitby	In active build
71	2025	8m stock fishing Boat	N/A	N/A	N/A	Built as a stock item, (Aluminum catamaran)	N/A	Whitby	Launched
72	2026	15.58m HullMax Workboat	Milestone	N/A	N/A	Being built at Whitby yard for Salcombe Harbour Authority	N/A	Whitby	launched 29/06/2026
73	2027	27m hybrid fish feed carrier	Margaret McKenzie	N/A	N/A	will be built at Middlesbrough yard for Inverlussa Marine Services	N/A	Middlesbrough	In active build

== See also ==
- List of shipbuilders in the United Kingdom
