= Duck Bridge =

Medieval bridge in North Yorkshire, England

Duck Bridge Danby Castle Bridge
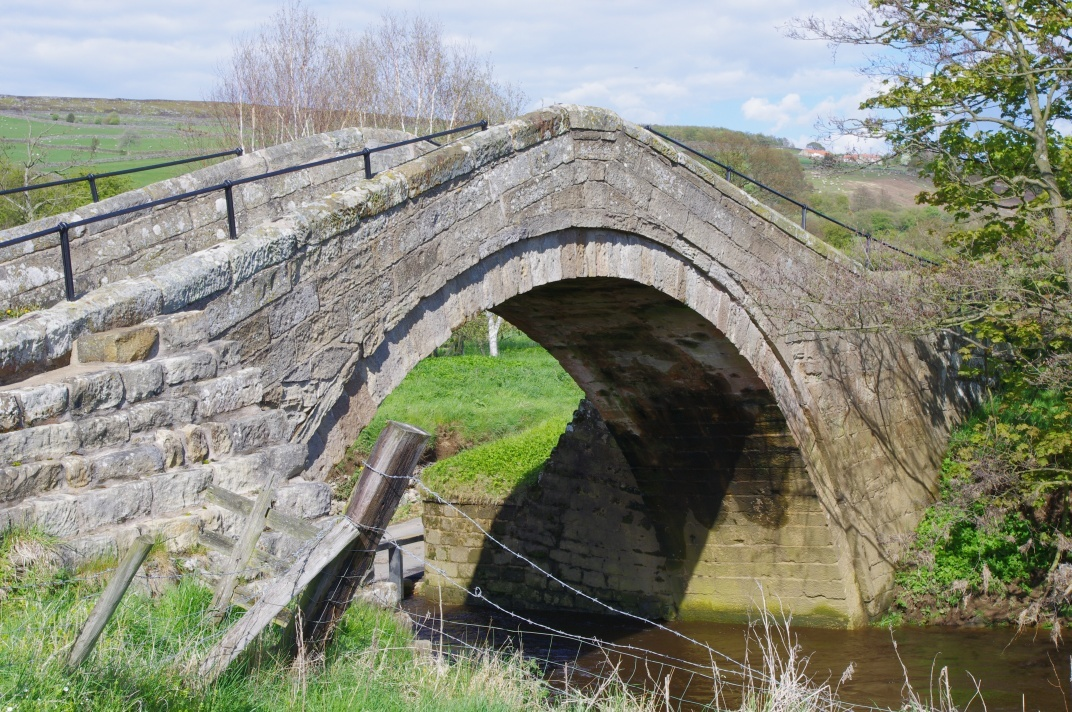
- The bridge, in 2012
- Coordinates: 54.4608°N 0.8981°W
- OS grid reference: NZ714080
- Carries: Pedestrians and packhorses (formerly)
- Crosses: River Esk
- Locale: Danby, North Yorkshire, England
- Official name: Duck Bridge (also known as Danby Castle Bridge)

Characteristics
- Design: Single-arch packhorse bridge
- Material: Sandstone dressed ashlar
- Width: 1.7 metres (5 ft 6.9 in)
- Longest span: 12.5 metres (41 ft 0.1 in)

History
- Opened: Late 14th century (rebuilt 1717)

Location
- Interactive map of Duck Bridge

Duck Bridge
- Interactive map of Duck Bridge
- Location: Danby, North Yorkshire

Listed Building – Grade II*
- Designated: 6 October 1952
- Reference no.: 1302337

Scheduled monument
- Official name: Duck Bridge packhorse bridge
- Reference no.: 1018848

Duck Bridge (historically recorded as Danby Castle Bridge or Danby Packhorse Bridge) is a late-medieval single-arch packhorse bridge crossing the River Esk at the eastern end of Eastern Lane, just south of the village of Danby in the North York Moors National Park, North Yorkshire, England.

The bridge is designated as a Grade II* listed building (List Entry 1302337) and a Scheduled Monument (List Entry 1018848) due to its exceptional state of preservation and historical significance as one of the finest surviving medieval packhorse bridges in Northern England.

== History ==
=== Medieval origins ===
The original bridge was constructed in the late 14th century, commissioned by the Neville family of nearby Danby Castle, who held the [ Lordship of Danby during the reign of Richard II. It was built to replace an earlier timber trestle crossing and to ensure reliable year-round transit across the Esk for heavy packhorse trains moving wool, timber, ironstone, and agricultural goods between Castleton, Danby, and Whitby Abbey.

The bridge formed a crucial link on the ancient packhorse route running along Eastern Lane towards Danby Castle, forming part of the regional "Trood" across the moorland dales prior to the construction of modern turnpike roads.

=== Rebuilding and naming ===
By the early 18th century, centuries of winter flooding had weakened the masonry upper works. In 1717, the bridge underwent substantial restoration by a local mason named George Duck, from whom the structure derives its popular modern name. Duck largely rebuilt the parapets and upper arch ring while retaining the original medieval ribbed vaulting underneath.

=== Preservation and protection ===
With the advent of wheeled vehicular transport in the 19th century, heavier traffic bypassed Eastern Lane via newer vehicular crossings over the Esk, preserving Duck Bridge's fragile medieval stonework.

Duck Bridge was granted Scheduled Monument protection under List Entry 1018848 and listed at Grade II* under List Entry 1302337 on 6 October 1952. Today, it is maintained by the North York Moors National Park Authority and North Yorkshire Council as a footbridge on the local public rights of way network. The river is crossed at this point by a ford situated to the north side of the bridge.

== Architecture ==
Duck Bridge is constructed from locally quarried dressed sandstone ashlar. It consists of a single high pointed arch spanning 12.5 metres (41.0 ft) across the River Esk, designed with a steep rise to allow floodwaters to pass safely beneath during heavy moorland run-off.

Key architectural features include on the underside of the arch which retains three heavy stone chamfered ribs dating from the original 14th-century construction. Also, the paved cobble deck leading from Eastern Lane is only 1.7 metres (5 ft 6.9 in) wide between the parapets, specifically engineered to prevent four-wheeled carts from using the bridge while allowing single-file packhorses laden with panniers to pass. The stone parapets are kept intentionally low to allow side-hanging panniers carried by packhorses to overhang the edges without striking the stonework. Several 18th-century masons' marks, alongside George Duck's initials and the date "1717", are inscribed into the inner parapet stonework.

== See also ==
- Grade II* listed buildings in North Yorkshire (district)
- Listed buildings in Danby, North Yorkshire
