= St Michael and St George's Church, Castleton =

Church in Castleton, North Yorkshire, England

Coordinates: 54°27′49″N 0°56′13″W

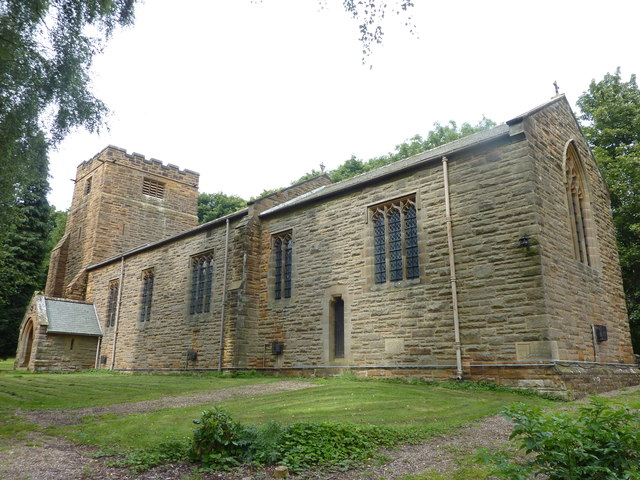
The church, in 2011

St Michael and St George's Church is an Anglican church in Castleton, North Yorkshire, a village in England.

The first church in Castleton was constructed in 1865, with funding from Viscountess Downe and Lydia Dawnay. It was an iron building, which served as a chapel of ease to St Hilda's Church, Danby. A new church was completed in 1924, on the initiative of the Reverend Sydney Smith. It was designed by Leslie Moore, and funded in part by a grant of £150 from the Incorporated Church Building Society. The building was grade II listed in 1969.

The church is built of sandstone with a green slate roof, and consists of a nave with a south porch, a chancel with a north vestry, and a west tower. The tower has two stages, the upper stage stepped-in, buttresses, a west doorway with a pointed arch, two and three-light bell openings, and an embattled parapet. The interior is plastered, with some exposed stone dressings. The chancel and tower arches both have carved wooden screens, and the sanctuary is panelled, with a reredos painting depicting the church's patron saints. There is a hexagonal stone font.

== See also ==
- Listed buildings in Danby, North Yorkshire
