= Listed buildings in Danby, North Yorkshire =

Danby is a civil parish in the county of North Yorkshire, England. It contains 78 listed buildings that are recorded in the National Heritage List for England. Of these, one is listed at Grade I, the highest of the three grades, two are at Grade II*, the middle grade, and the others are at Grade II, the lowest grade. The parish contains the settlements of Ainthorpe, Botton, Castleton, Commondale, Danby, Fryup and Westerdale, and the surrounding countryside and moorland. Most of the listed buildings are farmhouses and farm buildings, houses, cottages and associated structures. The others include churches and items in a churchyard, boundary stones, wayside crosses and guidestones, bridges, a watermill, a hotel and schools.

== Key ==
Grade	Criteria
I	Buildings of exceptional interest, sometimes considered to be internationally important
II*	Particularly important buildings of more than special interest
II	Buildings of national importance and special interest

== Buildings ==
Name and location	Photograph	Date	Notes	Grade
St Hilda's Church, Danby Dale; 54.44740°N 0.92790°W		14th century	The church has been altered and extended through the centuries, the nave was rebuilt in 1789, the chancel was added in 1848 by Fowler Jones, and in 1903–04 further alterations were made by Temple Moore. The church is built in sandstone and has a Lakeland slate roof. It consists of a nave, north and south aisles, a chancel with a north vestry, and a south tower. At the northwest corner is an external stair to a gallery. The tower contains a porch with a segmental-headed doorway and a chamfered surround, and has one stage, diagonal buttresses, a small west stair turret, paired bell openings, an eaves string course, and an embattled parapet with corner pinnacles.	II*
Danby Castle; 54.45548°N 0.89529°W		Late 14th century (probable)	A fortified manor house, partly in ruins and partly converted for other uses, it is in sandstone with roofs of tile and pantile. There is a square plan with diagonally-projecting corner towers, linked by ranges around a courtyard. The southeast corner has been converted into a farmhouse with two storeys, two bays, and to its west are farm buildings, including a two-storey barn and a single-storey cartshed.	I
Churchyard cross 54.44723°N 0.92783°W		Medieval (probable)	The cross in the churchyard of St Hilda's Church, Danby Dale, to the south of the tower, is in gritstone. It consists of a square base with an inset chamfered rectangular shaft about 1.2 metres (3 ft 11 in) high. On it is a wheel head, possibly from a different cross.	II
Clapper Bridge; 54.46120°N 0.93764°W	—	Medieval (probable)	The clapper bridge carries Ashfield Road over Danby Beck. It is in sandstone, and consists of two piers, pointed towards the upstream side and square on the downstream side, and lintels, over which is a reinforced concrete deck and a tarmac road surface.	II
Danby Beacon; 54.47344°N 0.86656°W		Medieval (probable)	A guidestone in gritstone with a square plan, about 1.2 metres (3 ft 11 in) high. On the south side is inscribed "BASDAL A" and the other inscriptions are illegible.	II
Duck Bridge; 54.45997°N 0.89156°W		Medieval	The bridge, which was largely rebuilt in 1717 and has since been bypassed, crosses the River Esk. It is in sandstone, and is hump-backed with a single round arch. The bridge has voussoirs, an arch ring, and peaked parapets with rounded coping. There are stepped abutments at the northwest and southeast corners, and large stepped end buttresses.	II*
White Cross (north); 54.48784°N 0.95273°W		Medieval	The square base of a medieval wayside cross is in limestone, on which is a shaft consisting of a 19th-century boundary stone in sandstone. The shaft has a cross on the north and south sides, and on the base is inscribed "WHITE CROSS" above a benchmark.	II
White Cross (south); 54.40887°N 0.95039°W		Medieval (probable)	The remains of a wayside cross are in sandstone. It consists of a large square plinth about 1 metre (3 ft 3 in) high and 0.6 metres (2 ft 0 in) square, with moulded angles. On the east and west faces are incised crosses, and on the plinth is the wheel head of a cross.	II
West Cliff Farmhouse; 54.43584°N 0.93988°W		17th century	A longhouse converted into a farmhouse, and later extended in the 19th century. It is in sandstone, and has roofs in concrete tiles with stone copings and kneelers. There are two storeys and an irregular plan. The windows are a mix, and include a three-light chamfered stone-mullioned window, horizontally-sliding sash windows, casement windows, a fire window, and a stair window with Y-tracery.	II
The Cottage; 54.46032°N 0.91557°W		c. 1700	The house is in sandstone, with swept eaves, and a pantile roof with a stone ridge, copings and block kneelers. There are two storeys and three bays, and a small lean-to on the right. In the centre is a doorway with a heavy lintel, and most of the windows are horizontally-sliding sashes.	II
Brookside Farmhouse; 54.44534°N 0.86145°W	—	Late 17th or early 18th century	The farmhouse is in stone on a plinth, and has a Welsh slate roof with stone copings and kneelers. There are two storeys, two bays, and a rear extension. Most of the windows are casements, there is a small fire window, and the doorway is in the right return.	II
27 and 29 Brook Lane, Ainthorpe, and outbuilding 54.46197°N 0.91455°W	—	Early 18th century	The house, cottage and outbuilding are in sandstone, and have pantile roofs with stone ridges, copings and kneelers. No. 27 is the older, and has two storeys, two wide bays, a plinth, a doorway with a chamfered surround, and mullioned windows with some mullions missing. To the left is a recessed bay with a porch in the angle. No. 29 is lower, with two storeys and two wide bays, a doorway with a chamfered surround, and inserted sash windows. The outbuilding contains two stable doors and a garage door, and above are three loft doors.	II
11 and 15 High Street, Castleton; 54.46334°N 0.94138°W	—	Early 18th century	A house, later two dwellings, in stone, with a pantile roof, stone coping and a kneeler. There are two storeys and two bays. On the front is a doorway and a porch, there is a fire window with a chamfered surround, and the other windows are modern and pivoted.	II
Bramble Carr; 54.45694°N 0.91335°W	—	Early 18th century	A farmhouse in sandstone that has a pantile roof with a stone ridge, copings and kneelers. There are two storeys and three wide bays. On the front is a doorway, and chamfered mullioned windows, those on the ground floor with heavy lintels.	II
Crag House and barn 54.44643°N 0.94269°W		Early 18th century	The farmhouse and barn, which have been altered, are in sandstone, with a pantile roof that has a stone ridge, copings and moulded kneelers. There are two storeys and an attic, and four bays. The doorway has a dated lintel, and to its right are three-light windows with moulded surrounds, jambs, imposts, plinth blocks, and lintels with keystones. To the left of the doorway is a three-light chamfered mullioned window and a loft door, and further to the left is a barn with a Tudor arched doorway, and steps leading up to a loft door.	II
Stonebeck Gate; 54.43887°N 0.90095°W		Early 18th century	The house is in sandstone on a plinth, and has a pantile roof with stone copings and block kneelers. There are two storeys and two wide bays, and a right lean-to containing the entrance. The windows are a mix of sashes and casements, some with chamfered mullions, and there is a chamfered fire window.	II
23 Briery Hill, Danby; 54.46872°N 0.90654°W	—	Early to mid 18th century	A sandstone house with a French tile roof, stone copings and kneelers. It is in two parts, the older part with two storeys and two bays, and to the right the other part has three storeys and one bay dating from later in the 18th century. On the front is a doorway, and in both parts are casement windows with chamfered surrounds in the ground floor, and horizontal-sliding sash windows above.	II
21 Briery Hill, Danby; 54.46872°N 0.90668°W	—	Mid 18th century	The house is in sandstone with a pantile roof. There are two storeys and two bays. On the front is a doorway flanked by canted bay windows, and the other windows are sashes.	II
Boundary stone on border with Westerdale county parish 54.41630°N 0.95015°W		18th century	The boundary stone is in gritstone, it is square, and about 0.5 metres (1 ft 8 in) high. The west side is inscribed "Westerdale", and on the south face is "Danby Rd".	II
Cartshed, pigsty and henhouse to north of Beckside Farmhouse; 54.44410°N 0.86299°W	—	18th century	The cartshed is the older, and the pigsty with a hen house above were added in the early 19th century. They are in sandstone and have pantile roofs with a stone ridge and copings, and shaped kneelers. The cartshed contains a segmental-arched entrance, and the pigsty has three doorways and three feeding chutes. Steps lead up the doorway in the hen house.	II
Danby Post Office; 54.46852°N 0.90890°W		18th century	A house with a shop to the right in sandstone, with a pantile roof, stone copings and block kneelers. The house has two storeys and two bays, the shop is lower with two storeys and two bays, and to the right is a later lean-to extension. The house has sash windows, to the right is a doorway over which is a fixed light, and further to the right is a projecting single-storey shopfront with a casement window above.	II
Highgarth; 54.46096°N 0.94774°W	—	18th century	The house is in sandstone, and has a pantile roof with a stone ridge, copings and block kneelers. There is one storey and attics, and four bays. On the front is a gabled porch, the windows are a mix of sashes and casement windows with keystones, those in the upper floor in half-dormers, and at the rear is a bay window.	II
Holly House and stable 54.46872°N 0.90875°W	—	18th century	The house and stable at the left are in sandstone with swept pantile roofs. The house has stone copings and block kneelers, two storeys and two bays. In the centre is a doorway with an alternate-block surround, and the windows are tripartite, the central section opening, in chamfered surrounds.	II
Spring trough to west of Hornby House; 54.46855°N 0.90540°W	—	18th century (probable)	The stone trough is wedge-shaped, with a rounded narrow end set into a hillside, and is enclosed by a low wall. To the left is a stone bucket, and in front is a step. Spring water flows through a stoneware pipe set into the rear wall, and the trough is dipped at the left to an overflow with an iron grille.	II
Ivy House and Cottage; 54.46239°N 0.93779°W		Mid 18th century	A farmhouse and an attached cottage in stone, with coped gables and kneelers, and two storeys. The farmhouse has a pantile roof and two bays. In the centre is a doorway, and the windows are sashes. To the right is a taller cottage with a Roman tile roof and a single bay, and to the left is a single-storey outhouse. At the rear is a mix of sash and casement windows.	II
Agar tomb 54.44735°N 0.92778°W	—	Mid to late 18th century	The tomb is in the churchyard of St Hilda's Church, Danby Dale, to the east of the tower, and is the tomb of the family of John Agar. It is a table tomb in sandstone, and consists of a moulded slab on an upright panelled slab. There are quadrant curves at the corners and shallow serpentine-curved end panels.	II
Fryup Hall; 54.43032°N 0.88799°W		Mid to late 18th century	A farmhouse in sandstone, with quoins, a moulded eaves cornice, and a pantile roof with stone copings and moulded kneelers. There are two storeys and three bays, and a single-storey kitchen wing on the right. In the centre is a doorway with a heavy lintel and a triple keystone, and the windows are sashes with alternate-block jambs.	II
Danby Lodge Farmhouse; 54.46612°N 0.89867°W	—	1774	The farmhouse is in stone, the right return rendered, and it has a pantile roof with a stone ridge, coping and kneelers. There are two storeys, three bays, and a single-storey extension on the left. The inserted central doorway has sidelights, above it is an inserted window, to its right is a blocked window, and the other windows are small-pane casements. All the openings have keystones. In the extension is a doorway and a sash window.	II
Prudom headstone and stone to the north 54.44728°N 0.92789°W	—	1775	A pair of headstones in the churchyard of St Hilda's Church, Danby Dale, to the south of the tower. One is to the memory of Thomas Prudom, and the other name is undecipherable. Each headstone has a shaped top with carvings of three angels, and the borders have symbols of mortality.	II
2–6 Ashfield Road, Castleton, wall and outbuildings 54.46272°N 0.93787°W	—	Late 18th century	The buildings are in sandstone. The row of cottages has a plinth, and a pantile roof with a stone ridge, copings and block kneelers. There are two storeys and three bays, and the cottages contain three doorways, two with fanlights, and sash windows. The wall runs to the south, and links with two outbuildings containing an owl hole in the north wall.	II
Barn and stable to northwest of Beckside Farmhouse; 54.44400°N 0.86329°W	—	Late 18th century	The barn with a stable to the right are in stone, and have a pantile roof with stone copings and kneelers. The building contains two stable doors, two loft doors, slit vents, and a casement window in the gable end. In front is a terrace with a mounting block.	II
Bullhouse and kennel to northwest of Beckside Farmhouse; 54.44399°N 0.86308°W	—	Late 18th century (probable)	The bullhouse and dog kennel are in sandstone and have pantile roofs with stone copings and kneelers. It consists of a small single-storey gable-ended building with a boarded door, and a lower kennel attached to the west.	II
Cow and beast house to west of Beckside Farmhouse; 54.44387°N 0.86315°W	—	Late 18th century (probable)	The building is in sandstone with stepped eaves courses, and a concrete tile roof with stone copings and block kneelers. There is a single storey and three bays, and it contains boarded openings.	II
Wall, gate piers, gates and stable to north of Church of St. Hilda; 54.44764°N 0.92816°W		Late 18th century	Along the north of the churchyard is a stone wall about 4 feet (1.2 m) high, with flat coping slabs. There are two entrances, one flanked by plain gate piers, the other with jambs, all with ball finials, and oak gates. The stable is in sandstone, with a pantile roof, stone copings and kneelers. There is a single storey and two bays, and it contains stable doors and a small window.	II
Congrave Farmhouse and cottage 54.46333°N 0.91480°W	—	Late 18th century	The house and cottage are in sandstone, and have a pantile roof with square keelers, and two storeys. The house has two wide bays, a doorway, and sash windows, those to the left are horizontally-sliding. All the openings have lintels with keystones. The cottage to the left has one bay and altered openings.	II
Farmbuilding to east of Congrave Farmhouse; 54.46343°N 0.91447°W	—	Late 18th century	A barn and byre in sandstone with a pantile roof and stone coping. There is one storey with a loft, five bays, and a lean-to on the right. In the ground floor are doorways, most with heavy tooled lintels, and above are loft doors interspersed with owl holes, and slit vents.	II
Byre to southwest of Crag House; 54.44621°N 0.94268°W	—	Late 18th century (probable)	The byre is in sandstone, with a stepped eaves cornice, and a swept pantile roof with stone copings and kneelers. There is a single storey and a loft, and one bay. It contains two doorways and a pitching door.	II
Barn, coach house and stables to northwest of Danby Lodge; 54.46632°N 0.89764°W	—	Late 18th century	The barn is the oldest part, with the rest dating from the 19th century. They are in stone, and have Welsh slate roofs with stone coping. The barn has two storeys, and contains a double door, loft doors and slit vents. The coach house to the right has two storeys, three round-arched openings with double doors, and small windows above. Further to the right is a single-storey stable with two stable doors and windows.	II
Slatehill House; 54.44029°N 0.90417°W	—	Late 18th century	The main part of the house is attached to part of an older building. It is in sandstone, and has a pantile roof with a stone ridge, copings and block kneelers. The main house has two storeys and two bays, and to the right is a single-storey older part and a lean-to. The central doorway has a fanlight, and the windows are sashes.	II
Stable to south of Stormy Hall; 54.43071°N 0.94059°W	—	Late 18th century	The stable with a hayloft above is in sandstone, and has a corrugated asbestos roof with a stone ridge, gable copings, and square kneelers. There are two storeys, three bays, and an extension on the right. In the ground floor are two stable doors and two small windows, and the upper floor contains two loading doors and slit vents.	II
Lumley House; 54.44167°N 0.92344°W		1777 or earlier	The house is in sandstone, and has a pantile roof with stone copings and kneelers. The main part has two storeys and an attic, and three bays, and to the left is a part with one storey and an attic, containing a doorway with a dated lintel. The windows are a mix, most are mullioned, some are chamfered, and the others include sashes, casements and a stair window.	II
Shepherds Cottage; 54.43063°N 0.94098°W	—	1795 or earlier	The former barn and cottage are in sandstone, with stepped eaves, and a pantile roof with stone coped gables and square kneelers. To the left is a single-storey single-bay cottage containing a stable doorway with a dated lintel. The barn has two storeys and five bays, and contains stable doors, mullioned windows, a loading door, a blacksmith's window and slit vents.	II
Barn to southeast of Crag House; 54.44631°N 0.94223°W		1798	The barn is in sandstone, and has a Lakeland slate roof with stone coping and kneelers. There is one storey and a loft, three bays, an added bay to the right, and a lean-to. The barn contains a stable door with a dated lintel and vents, in the right bay is a segmental-arched cart entrance, and in the upper floor are pitching doors and slit vents.	II
Wedding Barn, Danby Castle Farm; 54.45522°N 0.89484°W	—	c. 1800	A stable, barn and byre converted for other uses, in sandstone on a plinth, with a pantile roof, a stone ridge, copings and kneelers. There is one storey and a loft, three bays, a central rear extension, and a lean-to at each end. The building contains stable doors, plain doorways, loading doors and slit vents.	II
Barn to southwest of Lumley House; 54.44173°N 0.92392°W	—	Late 18th to early 19th century	The barn is in sandstone, and has a pantile roof with stone copings and square kneelers. There are two storeys and four bays. The barn contains two doorways, one with a heavy wedge lintel and a false keystone. In the upper floor are three pitching doors and slit vents.	II
The Grange; 54.46860°N 0.91255°W	—	1810	The house is in sandstone on a plinth, with quoins, a floor band, a dentilled eaves cornice, a blocking course, and a slate roof with stone copings. There are two storeys and three bays. On the front is a gabled porch, a central round-arched stair window, and sash windows with lintels carved to resemble voussoirs. In the right return is a doorway with a patterned fanlight, approached by six moulded steps.	II
Beckside Farmhouse, cottage and outbuilding 54.44389°N 0.86295°W	—	1813	Extensions to the farmhouse were later added to the rear, and a projecting cottage on the left in the mid 19th century. The buildings are in sandstone, and have swept pantile roofs with stone coping and moulded kneelers. The farmhouse and cottage have two storeys and two bays each. The farmhouse contains a doorway and pivoting windows under deep wedge lintels, and the cottage has a doorway with a fanlight, and sash windows. At the rear is a single-storey kitchen extension, and to the left is a wing with a boiler house and a cowhouse.	II
Byre to south of Crag House; 54.44615°N 0.94233°W	—	Early 19th century (probable)	The byre is in sandstone with a Welsh slate roof. It is a long building with one storey at the right end and two at the left. It contains three doorways, one a stable door, a chamfered opening, slit vents, and loft doors.	II
Outbuildings to north of Crag House; 54.44654°N 0.94292°W	—	Early 19th century	The stable and henhouse with pigsty are in sandstone, and have pantile roofs with stone ridges, copings and square kneelers. On the front of the stable is a stable doorway with a heavy lintel, and on the west return are a cart entrance and steps up to a loft door. To the right is a walled yard linking with the henhouse and pigsty, which has two low floors and is roofless.	II
Danby Mill; 54.46538°N 0.91035°W		Early 19th century	A watermill in sandstone with a Lakeland slate roof, stone copings and kneelers. There are four storeys and three bays, and a low wheelhouse on the left. The mill contains a stable door with a heavy lintel, and casement windows.	II
Downe Arms Hotel; 54.46332°N 0.94050°W	—	Early 19th century	The hotel is in sandstone, and has a pantile roof with stone coped gables. There are three storeys and three wide bays, and a two-storey two-bay wing on the left. In the main block is a doorway with a fanlight, and sash windows. The wing contains a doorway and sash windows, one in a gabled half-dormer.	II
House opposite Stonebeck Gate; 54.43874°N 0.90107°W	—	Early 19th century (probable)	Two cottages, later a house, in sandstone, with stepped eaves, and a pantile roof with stone copings and kneelers. There are two storeys and three wide bays. On the front is a doorway, to the left is a blocked doorway with an inserted window, and the other windows are sashes.	II
Barn and engine house to west of Stormy Hall; 54.43076°N 0.94084°W	—	Early 19th century	The building consists of a threshing barn with a gin gang and pigsties. It is in sandstone, the gin gang has a multi-hipped pantile roof, and the rest has a concrete tile roof. The gin gang has a half-octagonal ending, with buttresses and platforms on the east side. In the barn is a loading door, slit vents, a stable door, and feeding chutes.	II
Front wall and outbuilding, The Grange; 54.46870°N 0.91255°W	—	Early 19th century	The wall and shed are in sandstone. The shed has a Welsh slate roof with coped gables and contains two doorways and a horizontally-sliding sash window. The wall has flat coping, it extends to the east, and contains a gateway with an inscribed lintel, and falls away with a series of ramps.	II
Stormy Hall House and Cottage; 54.43087°N 0.94069°W	—	1827	The farmhouse is in sandstone on a high plinth, and has a roof in concrete tiles with stone coping and curved kneelers. There are two storeys and a basement, three bays, and flanking extensions. On the front is a doorway with a dated and initialled lintel, and the windows are casements. At the rear are casement and sash windows, and in the right extension is a re-set initialled and dated lintel.	II
Threshing barn to east of Forest Lodge Farmhouse; 54.45135°N 0.94440°W	—	1832	The threshing barn and the taller barn to the right, dated 1863, are in sandstone, the left barn with a pantile roof, the taller barn with a Welsh slate roof, and both with stone copings and square kneelers. The threshing barn has one storey and a loft, and three narrow bays. It contains central opposing doors, a dated lintel panel, slit vents and pitching doors. On the roof is a cross formed in black tiles. The right barn has two storeys and two bays, and contains a door with a dated lintel, a small blocked window and a loft door.	II
Stonebeck Gate Farmhouse, cottage and stable 54.43843°N 0.89916°W		1832 (probable)	The buildings are in sandstone, and have tile roofs with a stone ridge and copings. There are two storeys and three bays, and a rear extension. The windows are sashes. The stable to the left has a single storey, and contains a doorway and slit vents.	II
Farm buildings to west of Stonebeck Gate Farmhouse; 54.43841°N 0.89988°W		1832	A planned farm, the buildings in sandstone with pantile roofs, stone copings and kneelers, in four ranges around a courtyard. The south range has a central segmental arch with voussoirs, and an inscribed keystone. To the left is a cartshed, and to the right is a byre with a loft above. The west range has a central dovecote with a pyramidal roof, flanked by single-storey stables. In the north range are byres and loose boxes with lofts above, and the east range contains pigsties and a barn.	II
Farm buildings to rear of Stonebeck Gate Farmhouse; 54.43847°N 0.89943°W	—	c. 1832	The former barn and boil house are in sandstone on a plinth, with stepped eaves, and a tile roof with a stone ridge, copings and square kneelers, and they form an L-shaped plan. The barn has two storeys, and contains an open entrance, slit vents, a loading door and a pitching door. The boil house has a doorway and a small opening, and is joined to the barn by small link buildings.	II
Boundary stone at corner of boundary with Westerdale county parish 54.45816°N 0.95142°W	—	1835	A large boundary stone in sandstone about 50 centimetres (20 in) square and 1.4 metres (4 ft 7 in) high. It is inscribed on the east face with "GALLOW HOW D W" and the date.	II
Eight boundary stones on border with Westerdale; 54.45838°N 0.96062°W	—	c. 1835	The stones form an angled row. They are in sandstone with a square plan, about 1 metre (3 ft 3 in) high, with roughly-rounded whitewashed tops. Each stone is inscribed on the north face with "D", and on the south face with "W".	II
Boundary stones on border with Westdale county parish 54.42084°N 0.94959°W	—	c. 1835	A row of nine boundary stones in sandstone. They have a square section, about 1 metre (3 ft 3 in) with whitewashed roughly rounded tops. Each stone is inscribed on the east face with "D", and on the west face with "W".	II
Boundary stones on border with Westdale county parish 54.42984°N 0.94903°W	—	c. 1835	A row of boundary stones in sandstone. They have a square section, about 1 metre (3 ft 3 in) with whitewashed roughly rounded tops. Each stone is inscribed on the east face with "D", and on the west face with "W".	II
Boundary stones on border with Westerdale county parish 54.44891°N 0.94931°W	—	c. 1835	A line of twelve boundary stones in sandstone. They have a square section, up to about 1 metre (3 ft 3 in) with whitewashed roughly rounded tops. Each stone is inscribed on the east face with "D", and on the west face with "W".	II
Boundary stones on border with Westerdale county parish 54.41192°N 0.95178°W	—	c. 1835	A row of three boundary stones in sandstone. They have a square section, about 1 metre (3 ft 3 in) with whitewashed roughly rounded tops. Each stone is inscribed on the east face with "D", and on the west face with "W".	II
Boundary stones on border with Westerdale county parish 54.44018°N 0.94882°W	—	c. 1835	A row of boundary stones, of which seven are visible. They are in sandstone, with a square section, and are about 1 metre (3 ft 3 in) with whitewashed roughly rounded tops. Each stone is inscribed on the east face with "D", and on the west face with "W".	II
Boundary stone on border with Westerdale county parish 54.42126°N 0.94976°W	—	Early to mid 19th century	The boundary stone is in sandstone, and consists of a square stone about 1 metre (3 ft 3 in) high and 0.2 metres (7.9 in) square. It is inscribed on the north side with "D" and on the south side with "W" and "0.S.B.M.".	II
Mackwood headstone 54.44735°N 0.92770°W	—	Early to mid 19th century	The headstone is in the churchyard of St Hilda's Church, Danby Dale, at the northeast corner of the nave. It commemorates members of a seagoing family who were drowned or died abroad. The headstone consists of a tall pink sandstone slab with a shaped top and a narrow raised border, with an inscription.	II
Cart shed to southeast of Forest Lodge Farmhouse; 54.45116°N 0.94441°W	—	1848	The cart shed is in sandstone and without a roof, but with end copings. There are two storeys and three bays. It contains a doorway with a dated lintel, two cart arches with chamfered shouldered lintels, a stable door, and a blocked feeding chute. At the east end is a lean-to stable.	II
Stable and byre to northeast of Forest Lodge Farmhouse; 54.45138°N 0.94465°W	—	1849	The buildings are in sandstone, and have pantile roofs with stone copings and square kneelers. The stable has one storey and three bays, and contains stable doors, a small blocked window and a slit vent. The byre is dated 1867, and has one storey and a loft, a basement at the far right, and six bays. It contains small windows, loft doors, and blocked basement feeding chutes. All the openings have heavy lintels.	II
The Vicarage; 54.45779°N 0.92351°W		1850	The vicarage is in sandstone, and has a purple slate roof with ridged gable copings. There are two tall storeys and fronts of three bays, and on the entrance front is another bay on the left. The doorways have Tudor arched heads, and most of the windows are mullioned and transomed, some in gabled half-dormers, and those on the garden front with hood moulds. Also on the garden front is a carved armorial panel.	II
Wall and outbuildings to west of The Vicarage; 54.45794°N 0.92368°W	—	Mid 19th century	The garden wall runs along the roadside, it is in stone, about 2.2 metres (7 ft 3 in) high, and has stepped buttresses and gabled copings. It contains a Tudor arched doorway with a chamfered surround, a carriage entrance and a gateway. At the north end is a stable and coach house with a purple slate roof and ridged coping, a single storey and three bays. At the south end is a smaller outbuilding.	II
Boundary stone and guidepost southwest of Dimmingdale Farmhouse; 54.48842°N 0.94529°W	—	Mid 19th century	The boundary stone and guidepost is in sandstone, and measures about 36 centimetres (14 in) by 28 centimetres (11 in) by 91 centimetres (36 in) high. It is inscribed "DANBY" on the west face, "MOORS HOLM" on the east face, and on the north face is a benchmark.	II
Forest Lodge Farmhouse and byre 54.45120°N 0.94488°W	—	1859	The farmhouse and byre are in sandstone, and have pantile roofs with stone copings and kneelers. There are two storeys and an attic, and three bays. The windows are sashes with heavy lintels, and in the right return are a fire window and an attic light. At the rear is a porch linking with the byre, which is dated 1867. This has one storey with a basement at the west end, and six bays. It contains a doorway, two stable doors, two small windows, two loft doors and two blocked chutes.	II
Danby School and master's house 54.46106°N 0.92228°W		c. 1860	The school and master's house are in sandstone, and have a Welsh slate roof with stone dressings. In the centre is a single-storey two-bay range containing an arched doorway with a hood mould, and to the left is a protruding chimney stack with a coat of arms flanked by casement windows. To the right is a projecting gabled two-storey wing with mullioned and transomed windows containing lights with pointed heads. On the left is a protruding single-storey gabled wing with a three-light window and an owl hole above. The right return contains the house, with one storey and an attic and three bays, containing a doorway with a pointed arch, and mullioned and transomed windows.	II
County Primary School, Castleton; 54.46338°N 0.94323°W		1874	The school and the master's house to the right are in stone, with a stepped plinth to the projections, quoins, and a Welsh slate roof with clay ridge tiles. There is a U-shaped plan, consisting of a single-storey, four-bay school linked by a square stair tower to the house, which has two storeys and an attic, and two bays. The left bay of the school projects as a gabled wing with bargeboards, and in the angle is a porch containing an entrance with a moulded surround and a segmental-arched head, a pyramidal roof and a finial. The windows in the school are mullioned and transomed. The tower has three storeys, narrow windows and a pavilion roof.	II
Walls, gate piers and raillings, Castleton School; 54.46325°N 0.94320°W		c. 1874	The forecourt of the school is enclosed by low stone walls with sloped copings, on which are cast iron railings with patterned heads. The walls contain three pairs of chamfered gate piers with ogee pyramidal caps and initials.	II
St Michael and St George's Church, Castleton; 54.46373°N 0.93701°W		1924	The church is in sandstone with a green slate roof, and consists of a nave with a south porch, a chancel with a north vestry, and a west tower. The tower has two stages, the upper stage stepped-in, buttresses, a west doorway with a pointed arch, two and three-light bell openings, and an embattled parapet.	II
