= Danby Castle =

Castle in North Yorkshire, England

Coordinates: 54°27′20″N 0°53′43″W

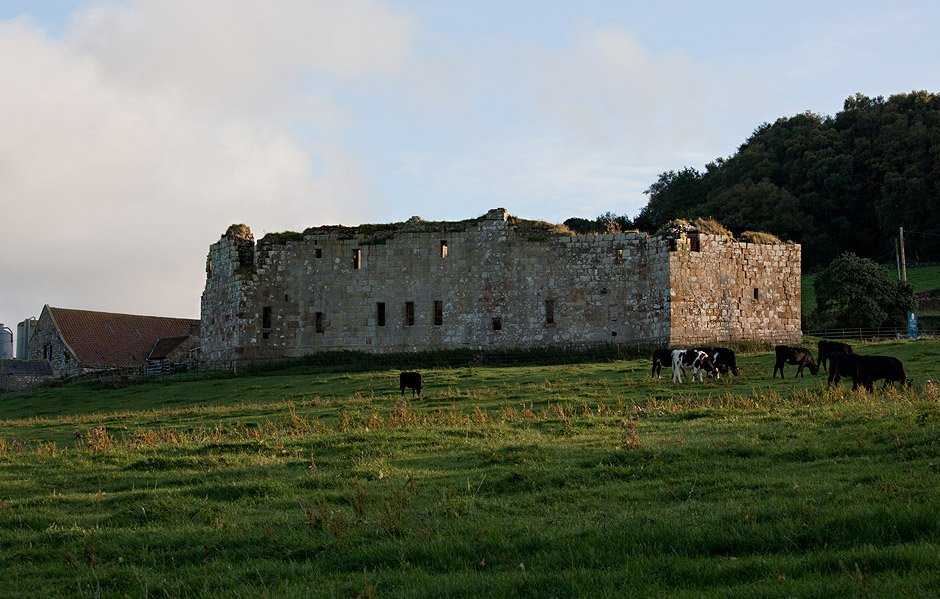
The castle ruins, seen from the north

Danby Castle is a historic building in Danby, North Yorkshire, a village in England.

The castle was first recorded in 1242, but it was in ruins by 1336, according to local tradition due to a fire and the reuse of its stone in constructing St Hilda's Church, Danby. The current building dates from the late 14th century, with some alterations to the south wing having been made in the mid and late 16th century. During this period, it may have been the home of Catherine Parr. Much of the building later fell into ruin, but part of the southern range was converted into a farmhouse, with a large cellar underneath and a courtroom on the first floor, formerly the great chamber.

The building was grade I listed in 1990. The castle is now a wedding venue, managed by The Gilchrist Collection. Danby court leet, the all male, baronial court whose origins were as a manorial court, but whose functions are now restricted to the management of common land, regularly meets in the courtroom.

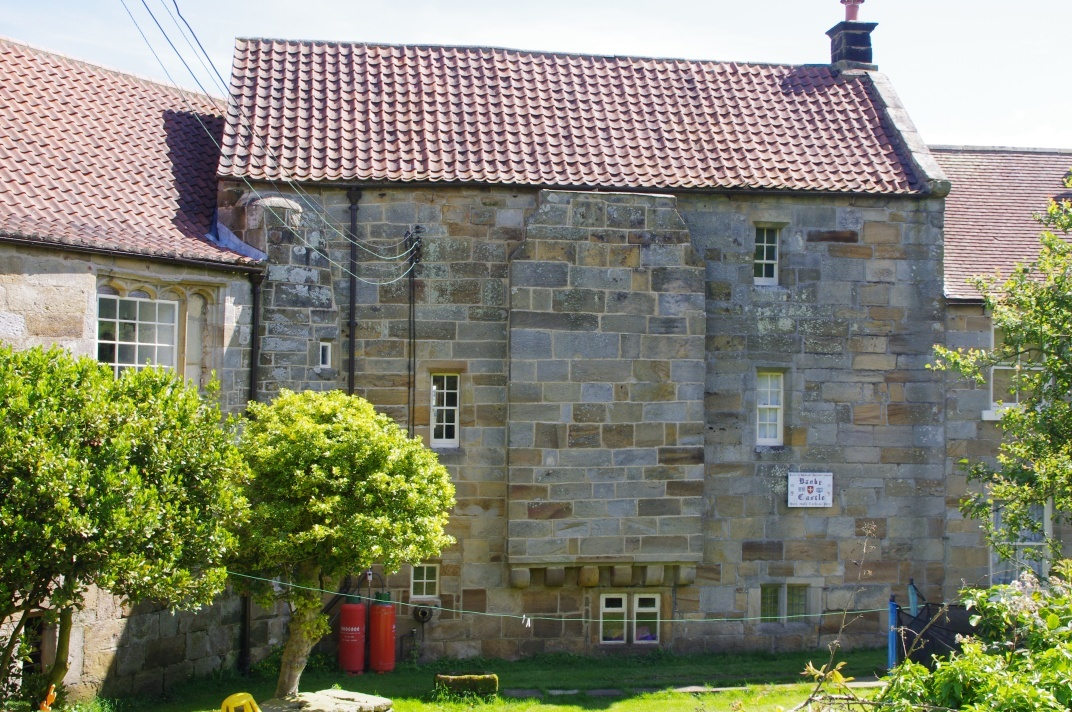
Surviving castle buildings

The castle is constructed of sandstone with roofs of tile and pantile. It has a square plan with diagonally-projecting corner towers, linked by ranges around a courtyard. The courtyard originally had the great hall to its east, the kitchen to its north, and the main entrance to its west. The southeast corner has been converted and extended to form a farmhouse with two storeys and two bays, and to its west are farm buildings, including a two-storey barn and a single-storey cartshed.

== See also ==
- Grade I listed buildings in North Yorkshire (district)
- Listed buildings in Danby, North Yorkshire
