= Castleton, North Yorkshire =

Village in North Yorkshire, England

Coordinates: 54°27′48″N 0°56′25″W

Castleton
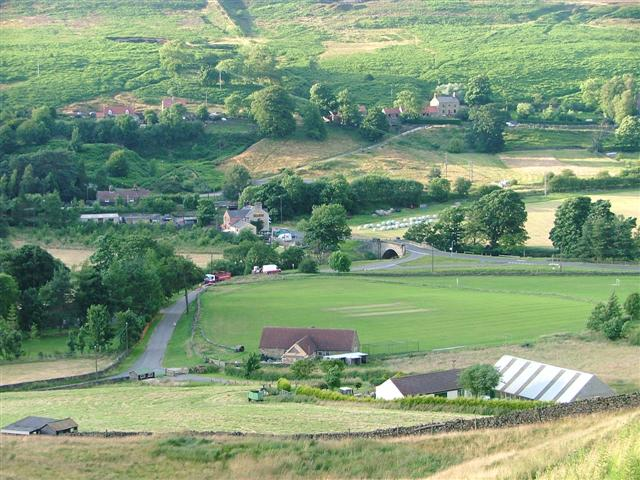
- A view over Castleton

- Location within North Yorkshire
- OS grid reference: NZ688081
- Civil parish: Danby
- Unitary authority: North Yorkshire
- Ceremonial county: North Yorkshire
- Region: Yorkshire and the Humber
- Country: England
- Sovereign state: United Kingdom
- Post town: WHITBY
- Postcode district: YO21
- Police: North Yorkshire
- Fire: North Yorkshire
- Ambulance: Yorkshire

Castleton is a village on the River Esk, part of the civil parish of Danby in the county of North Yorkshire in England, 7.1 miles (11.5 km) south-east of Guisborough, in the North York Moors. There was once a medieval castle on Castle Hill, which is thought to have been abandoned when Danby Castle was constructed.

Castleton was once the main market and industrial town serving Upper Eskdale. There were annual wool, cheese and cattle fairs, cheese market and a silk mill. An agricultural show is held annually during September.

Castleton has a local church, St Michael and St George's Church. Castleton is a centre for walking, birdwatching, shooting and many other pursuits. It is said that Castleton was named after a castle built near the River Esk. The village has a clapper bridge that spans Danby Beck; this bridge was listed as Grade II in 2016.

Church street, the main street in Castleton

== Transport ==
Castleton is served by Castleton Moor railway station on the Esk Valley Line, roughly halfway between Middlesbrough and Whitby.

The Esk Valley Walk runs through the village.

== History ==
A severed hand, known popularly as the Danby Hand of Glory, was found hidden in a wall of a thatched cottage in Castleton in 1935. The hand is now on display at the Whitby Museum in Pannett Park, Whitby.

In 1772, preacher and founder of Methodism, John Wesley preached in Castleton; the occasion is commemorated by a sundial on Primrose Hill in Castleton High Street.

== Education ==
Castleton has a primary school (Castleton Community Primary School), and secondary education is available at Caedmon College or Eskdale School, which are both in Whitby.

== Sport ==
Castleton Cricket Club was established in 1972 and its ground is based on the northern edge of the village along New Road. Castleton CC have two senior teams: a Saturday 1st XI that compete in the Langbaurgh Cricket League and a Midweek Senior XI in the Esk Valley Evening League.

== See also ==
- Listed buildings in Danby, North Yorkshire
