= John Christopher Atkinson =

English author (1814–1900)

John Christopher Atkinson (9 May 1814 – 31 March 1900) was an English author, antiquary, and a priest.

== Life ==
Born on 9 May 1814 at Goldhanger in Essex, where his father was then curate, he was the son of John Atkinson and the grandson of Christopher Atkinson (d. 18 March 1795), fellow of Trinity Hall, Cambridge. He was educated at Kelvedon in Essex, and admitted as a sizar to St. John's College, Cambridge, on 2 May 1834, graduating B.A. in 1838.

Atkinson was ordained deacon in 1841 as curate of Brockhampton in Herefordshire, and priest in 1842. He afterwards held a curacy in Scarborough. In 1847 he became domestic chaplain to William Dawnay, 7th Viscount Downe, who in the same year presented him to the vicarage of Danby, in the North Riding of Yorkshire, which he held till his death.

Atkinson's parish was in rural Yorkshire, and on his arrival he found that clerical duties had been neglected. He set himself to learn the history of his parish cure and to gain the friendship of his parishioners; and learned local legends and customs. In 1887 he received the honorary degree of D.C.L. from Durham University, and in 1891 he was installed in the prebend of Holme in York Minster. In 1898 he received a grant of £100 a year from the civil list.

Atkinson died at The Vicarage, Danby, on 31 March 1900.

== Works ==
Atkinson is best known for Forty Years in a Moorland Parish (1891, second edition the same year). Comparisons have been made with Gilbert White's Natural History of Selborne, and Hugh Miller's Scenes and Legends of the North of Scotland.

In 1867 Atkinson prepared for the Philological Society A Glossary of the Dialect of the Hundred of Lonsdale, which was published in the society's Transactions. It was followed in 1868 by A Glossary of the Cleveland Dialect, to which, for the English Dialect Society, he made Additions in 1876. In 1872 he published the first volume of The History of Cleveland, Ancient and Modern, London; part of a second volume appeared in 1877, but it was not completed. Other works were:

- The Walks, Talks, Travels, and Exploits of two Schoolboys, London, 1859, new edition 1892.
- Play-hours and Half-holidays; or, Further Experiences of two Schoolboys, London, 1860, new edition 1892.
- Sketches in Natural History; with an Essay on Reason and Instinct, London, 1861; new edition 1865.
- British Birds' Eggs and Nests popularly described, London, 1861, new edition 1898.
- Stanton Grange; or. At a Private Tutor's, London, 1864.
- Lost; or What came of a Slip from "Honour Bright", London, 1870.
- The Last of the Giant Killers, London, 1891, new edition 1893.
- Scenes in Fairy-land, London, 1892.

He edited:

- Cartularium Abbathiæ de Whiteby (Surtees Soc), 1879, 2 vols.
- Quarter Sessions Records (North Riding Record Soc), 1883–92, 9 vols.
- Lonsdale Glossary: Furness Coucher Book (Chetham Soc), 1886–7, 3 vols.
- Cartularium Abbathiæ de Rievalle (Surtees Soc), 1859.

He also contributed papers to archaeological societies, and in 1872 assisted Hensleigh Wedgwood in revising his Dictionary of English Etymology.

== Family ==
Atkinson was married three times: first, at Scarborough on 11 December 1849, to Jane Hill (d. 2 April 1860), eldest daughter of John Hill Coulson of Scarborough; secondly, on 1 February 1862, at Frome Selwood, to Georgina Mary, eldest daughter of Barlow Slade of North House, Frome; and thirdly, on 28 April 1884 at Arncliff church, to Helen Georgina, eldest daughter of Douglas Brown, Q. C ., of Arncliff Hall, Northallerton. He had thirteen children.
