= Listed buildings in Commondale =

Commondale is a civil parish in the county of North Yorkshire, England. It contains eight listed buildings that are recorded in the National Heritage List for England. All the listed buildings are designated at Grade II, the lowest of the three grades, which is applied to "buildings of national importance and special interest". The parish contains the village of Commondale and the surrounding countryside, and the listed buildings consist of a bridge, a guidestone, two war memorials, and boundary stones.

== Buildings ==
Name and location	Photograph	Date	Notes
Guidestone; 54.48553°N 0.98796°W		Early 18th century (probable)	The guidestone, which stands by a junction, consists of a square stone about 0.5 metres (1 ft 8 in) high with a roughly-chamfered top, pointing hands, and initials on the top. On the south face, a hand points east to Whitby and another hand points west to Stokesley. On the west face, a hand points north to "JISBER" (Guisborough).
Dibble Bridge; 54.46177°N 0.95901°W		18th century	The bridge carries Dibble Bridge Bank over the River Esk. It is in sandstone, and consists of two round arches. The bridge has voussoirs, moulded arched rings, and cutwaters with ramped chamfer, rising to form a buttress at the central peak of each sloped parapet. The parapets have shallow gabled copings, at the corners the parapet is curved to form refuges, and at the ends are square piers.
Boundary stone about 990 metres northeast of Skelderskew Farmhouse; 54.49861°N 0.97840°W		1798	The boundary stone is in limestone. It consists of a roughly dressed shaft about 38 centimetres (15 in) by 38 centimetres (15 in) by 89 centimetres (35 in) high, and is inscribed with "RC 1798 G" on the south face.
Pair of boundary stones about 1870 metres south of Tidkinhow Farmhouse; 54.50016°N 0.99394°W		Early 19th century	The boundary stones consist of roughly-dressed limestone shafts. The west stone is about 37 centimetres (15 in) by 25 centimetres (9.8 in) by 1 metre (3 ft 3 in) high, and is inscribed with initials and dates. The east stone is about 30 centimetres (12 in) square and 67 centimetres (26 in) high, and is unmarked.
Boundary stone about 1150 metres northeast of Skelderskew Farmhouse; 54.49640°N 0.96674°W		Mid 19th century	The boundary stone is in limestone. It consists of a dressed shaft about 40 centimetres (16 in) by 40 centimetres (16 in) by 51 centimetres (20 in) high, and is inscribed with the letter "D".
Boundary stone about 1300 metres northeast of Skelderskew Farmhouse; 54.49294°N 0.96108°W		Mid 19th century	The boundary stone is in limestone. It consists of a dressed shaft about 35 centimetres (14 in) by 35 centimetres (14 in) by 91 centimetres (36 in) high, and is inscribed with the letter "D" on the south face.
Shepherds' Memorial; 54.49906°N 1.00571°W		c. 1920	A war memorial, standing in open moorland, to the memory of two shepherds who died as a result of injuries sustained during the First World War. It consists of a gritstone pillar about 2 metres (6 ft 7 in) high on a low base. At the top is a military badge carved in low relief in a panel, and below is an inscription.
War memorial 54.48551°N 0.97861°W		1921	The war memorial is by a road junction, and consists of a stone Latin cross, on a short tapering square-sectioned shaft. This stands on a plinth, on a base of four steps. On the plinth are brown salt-glazed stoneware tablets, with inscriptions on the front and rear, the names of those lost on the side panels, and there is another inscribed panel on the upper step. The memorial is enclosed by railings on a stone kerb.
