= Fryup =

Hamlet in North Yorkshire, England

Coordinates: 54.43173°N 0.89160°W

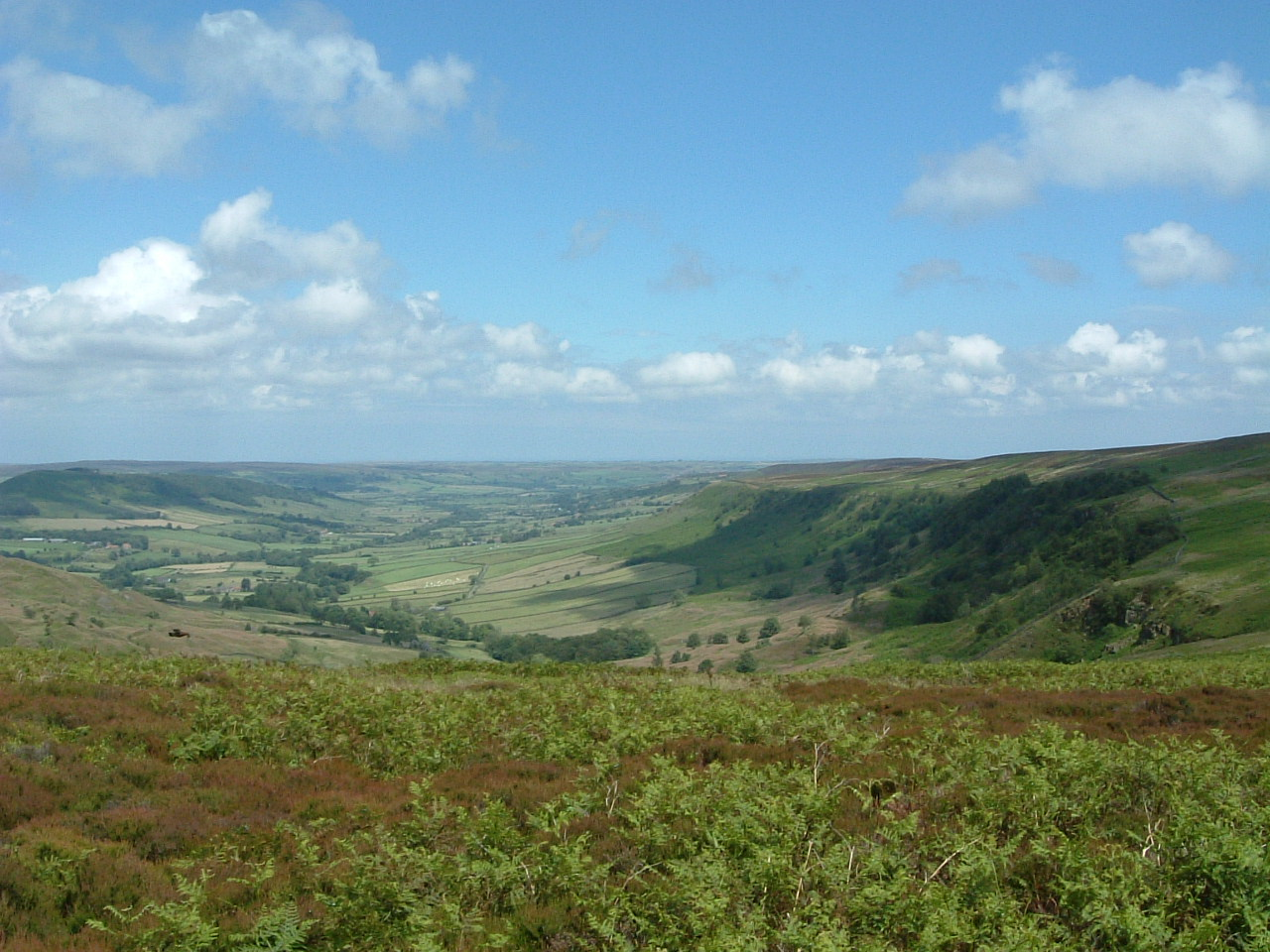
View of Great Fryup Dale from the valley head

Fryup (grid reference NZ720046) is a hamlet in the North York Moors National Park in North Yorkshire, England. It is within the civil parish of Danby, and is located alongside Great Fryup Beck in Great Fryup Dale.

Fryup is separated into two small valleys or dales: Great Fryup Dale and Little Fryup Dale. The majority of people live in Great Fryup Dale, with Little Fryup having only eight or nine farms and cottages. Great Fryup has no shops nor even a pub; it has a telephone box, a post box, village hall and outdoor centre which used to be the old school. There is also a local cricket pitch and Quoits pitch.

From 1974 to 2023 it was part of the Borough of Scarborough, it is now administered by the unitary North Yorkshire Council.

== Name ==
=== Name origin ===
The curious name Fryup may be a Yorkshire dialect reconstruction of the earlier name Frehope (14th century).

Survey of English Place-Names:

- Frihop(p) 1223.
- Frehope 1301.

The name was recorded as Fryop in the 19th century. (Note: Yorkshire ( Thomas Langdale ). .FRYOP, GREAT and LITTLE, 2 dales, in the township and parish of Danby, east-division of Langbarugh. . .)

The name element Fre may be a reference to the Norse goddess Frigg.

The name element hope is from Old English hōp or Middle English hope ( " valley " ). (Note: WiKtionary : English< hope > Etymology 3. " From Middle English hope ("a valley"), from Old English hōp (found only in placenames).")

Place names with the name element hope are common in the North Pennines, especially in the lead mining areas of Weardale. (Note: Examples of hope place names in County Durham: Stanhope; Ireshopeburn; Killhope; Rookhope; Burnhope)

=== Name legacy ===
The following names are derived from Fryup:

- Great Fryup Dale
  - Great Fryup Beck
  - Fryup Hall
  - Fryup End
- Little Fryup Dale
  - Little Fryup Beck

In 2014, it was reported that campaign group PETA (People for the Ethical Treatment of Animals) had asked for the hamlet's name to be changed to 'Vegan Fryup' in order to promote World Vegan Day.

== Local tradition and folklore ==
An old woman at Fryup was well known locally for keeping the Mark's e'en watch (24 April), as she lived alongside a corpse road known as Old Hell Road. The practice involved a village seer holding vigil between 11 pm and 1 am to watch for the wraiths of those who would die in the following 12 months.

== Sport ==
The Fryup Cricket Club ground and pavilion (built in 1925) is situated along the track off Long Causeway Road. The club senior XI compete in the Esk Valley Evening League.

== See also ==
- Listed buildings in Danby, North Yorkshire
