= St Hilda's Church, Danby =

Church in Danby, North Yorkshire, England

Coordinates: 54°26′51″N 0°55′40″W

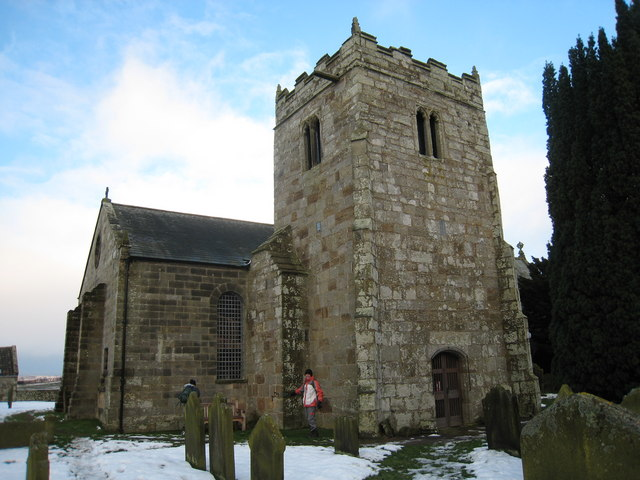
The church, in 2009

St Hilda's Church is the parish church of Danby, North Yorkshire, a village in England.

The church was probably first built in the 12th century, but it was entirely rebuilt in the early 13th century. A tower was added in the 15th century, and this is the oldest section to survive. The nave was rebuilt in 1789, and the chancel was rebuilt in 1848 by George Fowler Jones. The church was restored from 1903 to 1904 by Temple Moore, with the arcade being reconstructed, and the north gallery removed. The church was grade II* listed in 1969.

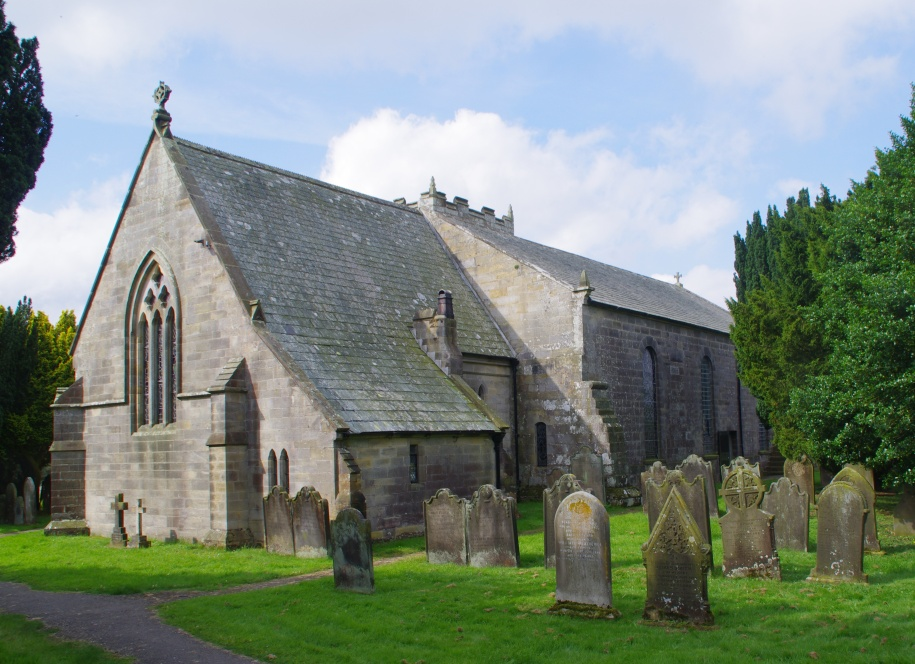
View from the north-east

The church is built of sandstone and has a Lakeland slate roof. It consists of a four-bay nave, north and south aisles, a chancel with a north vestry, and a south tower. At the northwest corner is an external stair to a gallery. The tower contains a porch with a segmental-headed doorway and a chamfered surround, and has one stage, diagonal buttresses, a small west stair turret, paired bell openings, an eaves string course, and an embattled parapet with corner pinnacles.

Inside the church, there is a panelled west gallery. The roofs are 19th century: king post in the nave, and arch-braced in the chancel. There are Minton tiles in the chancel, and the raised sanctuary. There is a mediaeval grave cover in the porch.

== See also ==
- Grade II* listed churches in North Yorkshire (district)
- Listed buildings in Danby, North Yorkshire
