= North York Moors =

Upland area in North Yorkshire, England

North York Moors National Park
- IUCN category V (protected landscape/seascape)
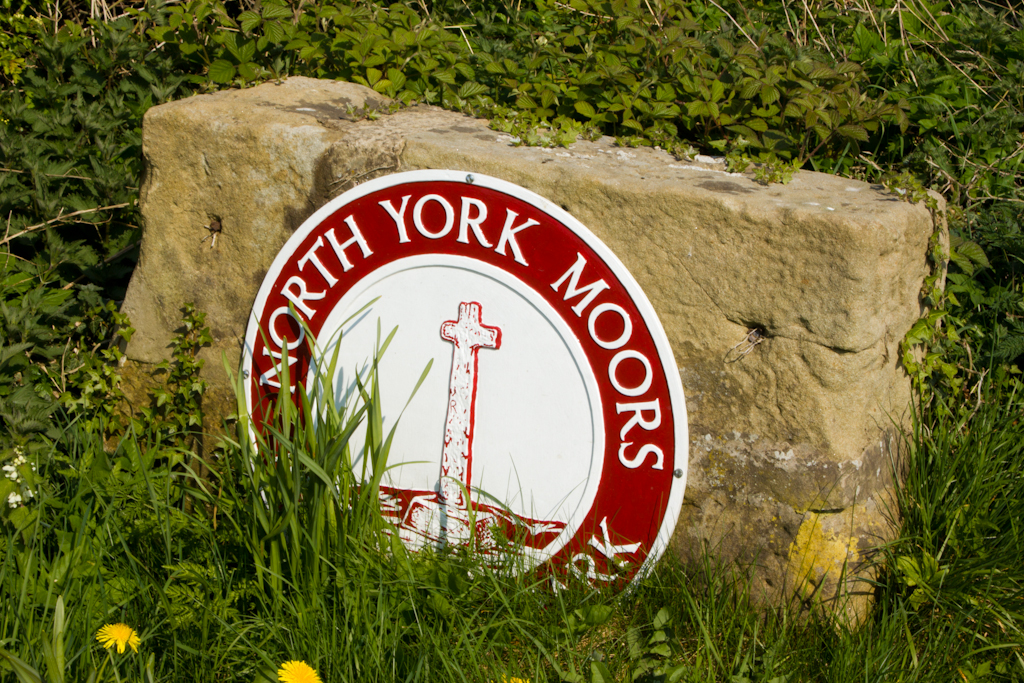
- North York Moors National Park sign near Great Ayton

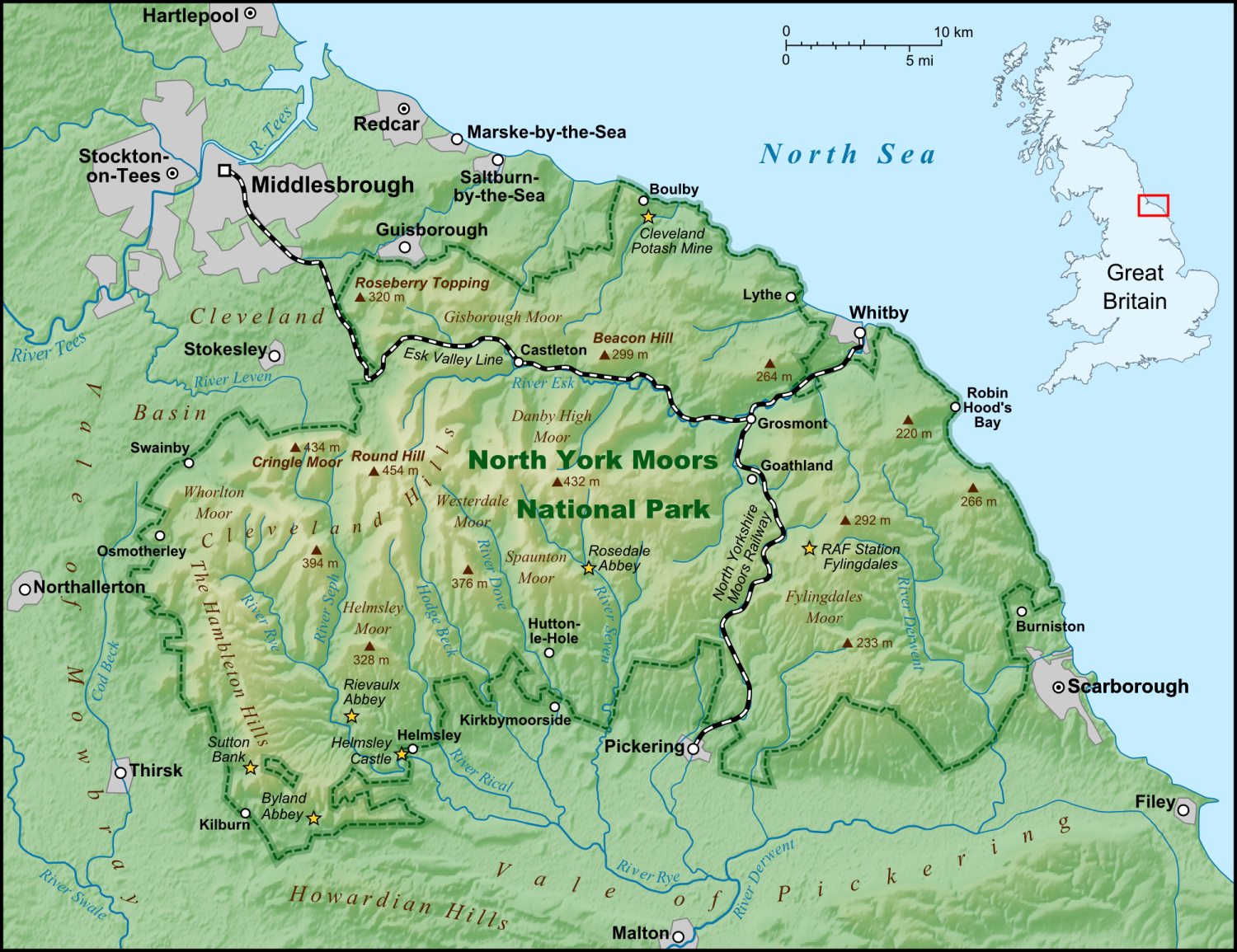
- Location: North Yorkshire, England
- Area: 1,436 km^{2} (554 sq mi)
- Established: 1952
- Governing body: North York Moors National Park Authority
- Website: www.northyorkmoors.org.uk

The North York Moors is an upland area and national park in North Yorkshire, England. It contains the largest expanse of heather moorland in the United Kingdom.

The area was designated a national park in 1952, through the National Parks and Access to the Countryside Act 1949. The park covers an area of 1,436 km^{2} (554 sq mi), and had a population of 22,935 at the 2021 census. It is administered by the North York Moors National Park Authority, which is based in Helmsley.

== Location and transport ==
To the east, the area is clearly defined by the impressive cliffs of the North Sea coast. The northern and western boundaries are defined by the steep scarp slopes of the Cleveland Hills edging the Tees lowlands and the Hambleton Hills above the Vale of Mowbray. To the south lies the broken line of the Tabular Hills and the Vale of Pickering.

Four roads cross the North York Moors from north to south. In the east, the A171 joins Whitby and Scarborough. Further inland, the A169 runs between Pickering and Whitby. More centrally, a minor road departs from the A170 at Keldholme and passes through Castleton before joining the A171 which connects Whitby and Guisborough. The most westerly route is the B1257 connecting Helmsley to Stokesley. The A170 from Thirsk to Scarborough marks the southern boundary of the North York Moors area.

The Esk Valley Line is an east–west branch line rail link from Whitby to Middlesbrough in the north, and the North Yorkshire Moors steam railway runs from Pickering to Grosmont with a link to Whitby. Other public transport within the North York Moors includes a number of bus services. Yorkshire Coastliner route 840 runs from Whitby to Pickering (and continues to York and Leeds), Arriva North East routes X93 and X94 run from Scarborough to Middlesbrough via Whitby and Guisborough, Arriva North East route 95 runs from Whitby to Lealholm along the Esk Valley, and East Yorkshire route 128 connects Scarborough and Helmsley. On weekends during the summer, these are complemented by Moorsbus services, which run from local urban centres into more remote parts of the national park which are difficult to access without private transport. Some of the routes across the North York Moors are noted for their beauty – the 840 was declared Britain's most scenic bus route by Bus Users UK while the X93 was the tenth most scenic.

The cyclists in the 2018 and 2019 Tour de Yorkshire passed through a section of the North York Moors.

== Physical geography ==
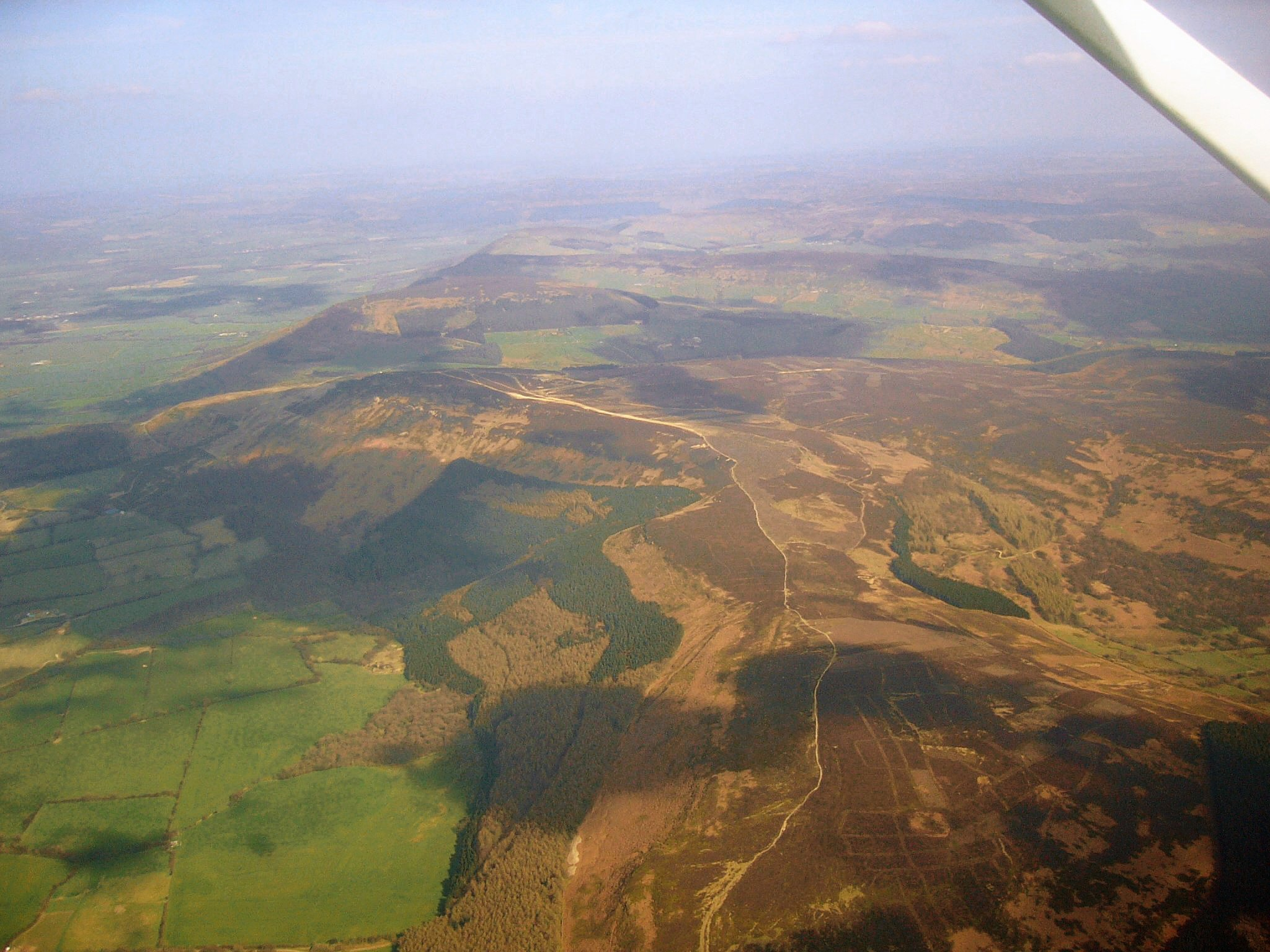
Aerial photo of the North York Moors

The North York Moors consist of a moorland plateau, dissected by a number of deep dales or valleys containing cultivated land or woodland. The largest dale is Eskdale, the valley of the River Esk which flows from west to east and empties into the North Sea at Whitby. At the western end of Eskdale, the valley divides into three smaller dales, Westerdale (the upper valley of the River Esk), Baysdale and Commondale. A series of side dales drain into Eskdale from the moorland on its southern side: from west to east these are Danby Dale, Little Fryup Dale, Great Fryup Dale, Glaisdale and the Goathland valley. Kildale, west of Commondale and separated only by a low watershed, is drained by the River Leven, which flows west to join the River Tees.

The Cleveland Hills rise north and west of Eskdale. They merge into the Hambleton Hills, which form the western edge of the North York Moors and form a sharp escarpment overlooking the Vale of Mowbray.

On their south side, the moorland is incised by a series of dales which cut through the Tabular Hills to drain into tributaries of the River Derwent. The westernmost dale is Rye Dale, to the west of which rise the Hambleton Hills. Bilsdale is a side dale of Rye Dale. East of Bilsdale Bransdale, Farndale, Rosedale and Newton Dale cut into the moorland. In the south east, the landscape is marked by the narrow valleys of the upper reaches of the Derwent and its upper tributaries.

About 22 per cent of the North York Moors is under woodland cover (mostly located to the south-west and south-east), equivalent to more than 300 square kilometres of trees. It is home to the largest concentration of ancient and veteran trees in northern England.

The Derwent crosses the Vale of Pickering flowing westwards, turns southwards at Malton and flows through the eastern part of the Vale of York before emptying into the River Ouse at Barmby on the Marsh.

=== Climate ===
As part of the United Kingdom, the North York Moors area generally has warm summers and relatively mild winters. Weather conditions vary from day to day as well as from season to season. The latitude of the area means that it is influenced by predominantly westerly winds with depressions and their associated fronts, bringing with them unsettled and windy weather, particularly in winter. Between depressions, there are often small mobile anticyclones that bring periods of fine weather. In winter, anticyclones bring cold dry weather. In summer, the anticyclones tend to bring dry settled conditions, which can lead to drought. For its latitude, this area is milder in winter and cooler in summer due to the influence of the Gulf Stream in the North Atlantic Ocean. Air temperature varies on a daily and seasonal basis. The temperature is usually lower at night and January is the coldest time of the year. The two dominant influences on the climate of the North York Moors are the shelter against the worst of the moist westerly winds provided by the Pennines and the proximity of the North Sea. Late, chilly springs and warm summers are a feature of the area, but there are often spells of fine autumn weather. Onshore winds in spring and early summer bring mists or low stratus clouds (known locally as sea frets) to the coasts and moorland. Within the area, variations in climate are brought about by local differences in altitude, aspect and shelter.

Snowfall is variable from year to year, but the area gets much more snow on average than other parts of the country. Heavy falls are associated with northeasterly winds off the North Sea. Roads over the high moorland areas are notoriously prone to drifting snow due to the exposed nature of the terrain.

Average recordings are:

- 100 wet days
- 215 dry days
- 50 snowfall days
- rainfall of 1,000 to 1,520 mm (39 to 60 in) near the coast
- rainfall of 635 to 760 mm (25 to 30 in) inland
- summer temperatures of 20 to 32 °C (68 to 90 °F)
- winter temperatures of −1 to 10 °C (30 to 50 °F)

Climate data for Fylingdales (North Yorkshire): elevation: 262 m (860 ft) Average maximum and minimum temperatures, and average rainfall recorded between 1991 and 2020 by the Met Office. Sunshine hours are for Scarborough, as no data has been recorded at Fylingdales.
Month	Jan	Feb	Mar	Apr	May	Jun	Jul	Aug	Sep	Oct	Nov	Dec	Year
Mean daily maximum °C (°F)	5.1 (41.2)	5.7 (42.3)	7.9 (46.2)	10.6 (51.1)	13.6 (56.5)	16.3 (61.3)	18.7 (65.7)	18.3 (64.9)	15.6 (60.1)	11.8 (53.2)	8.0 (46.4)	5.5 (41.9)	11.5 (52.7)
Mean daily minimum °C (°F)	0.4 (32.7)	0.3 (32.5)	1.9 (35.4)	3.2 (37.8)	5.7 (42.3)	8.5 (47.3)	10.6 (51.1)	10.6 (51.1)	8.8 (47.8)	6.1 (43.0)	3.0 (37.4)	0.7 (33.3)	4.96 (40.93)
Average precipitation mm (inches)	85.3 (3.36)	74.7 (2.94)	66.6 (2.62)	69.2 (2.72)	55.6 (2.19)	86.1 (3.39)	66.0 (2.60)	82.8 (3.26)	81.2 (3.20)	96.3 (3.79)	119.0 (4.69)	97.0 (3.82)	979.7 (38.57)
Average precipitation days (≥ 1.0 mm)	14.9	13.3	11.4	10.8	10.1	11.5	10.5	11.8	11.6	14.6	15.7	15.1	151.3
Mean monthly sunshine hours	56.3	83.5	117.9	164.8	213.8	189.3	201.3	188.5	142.5	101.9	64.9	54.2	1,578.8
Source 1: Met Office
Source 2: Met Office

=== Geology ===
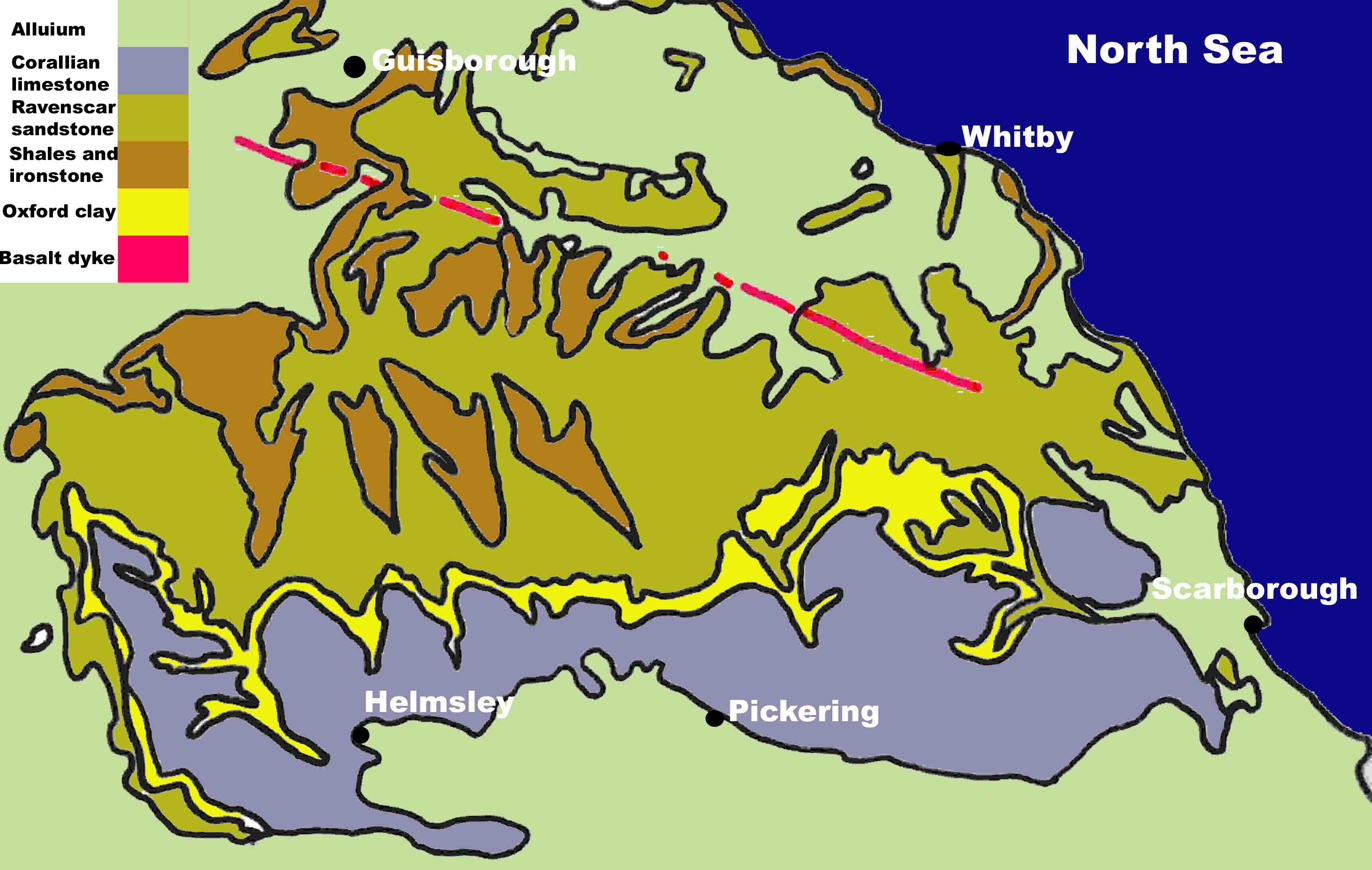
Simplified geology of the North York Moors

The geology of the North York Moors is dominated by rocks of the Jurassic period. They were mostly laid down in subtropical seas 205 to 142 million years ago. Fluctuations in sea level produced different rock types varying from shales to sandstones and limestones derived from coral. These marine and delta deposited rocks are well exposed on the Yorkshire coast from Staithes to Filey.

- Lower Jurassic At the beginning of the Jurassic period shales, clays and thin limestones and sandstones were deposited in a shallow sea. These deposits are many metres thick and include layers of ironstone of various thicknesses and the rocks from which alum is extracted.
- Middle Jurassic A period of gradual uplift happened when mudstone and sandstone were deposited on a low-lying coastal plain crossed by large rivers. Occasionally this land area was inundated by the sea and at these times calcareous rocks containing marine fossils were deposited. These are the Ravenscar Group of rocks. The Oxford Clay was deposited at the end of this epoch.
- Upper Jurassic Towards the end of the Jurassic period the land again sank beneath the sea. At first the sea was shallow and calcareous sandstones and limestones were deposited. These are the Corallian rocks of the Tabular Hills towards the south of the area. Overlying the Corallian rocks is the Kimmeridge Clay which underlies the Vale of Pickering but this is not exposed at the surface.

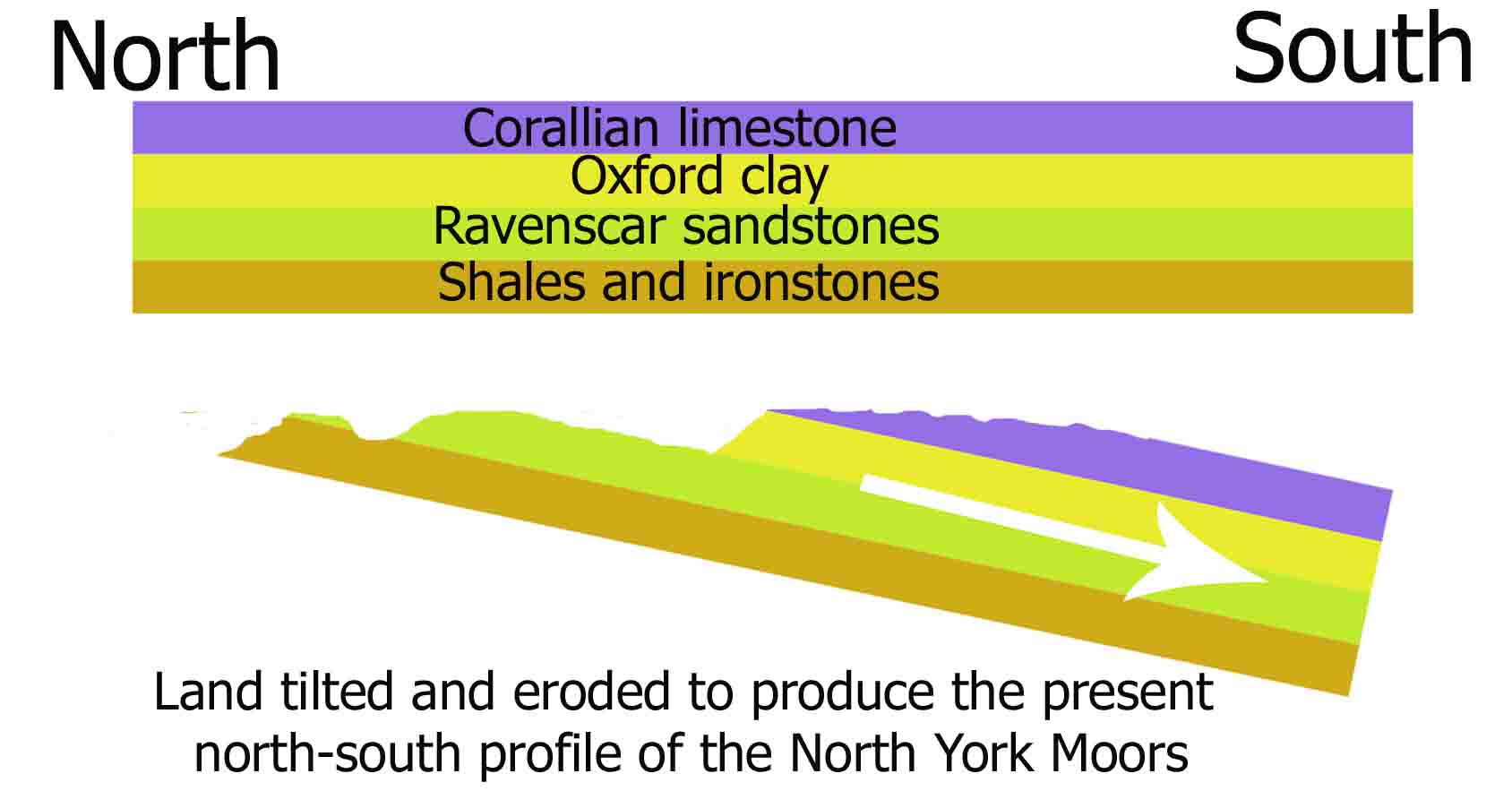
A cross section of the geology of the North York Moors

Subsequently, about 30 million years ago, the land was uplifted and tilted towards the south by earth movements. The upper layers of rock were eroded away and the older rocks were exposed in places. Because of the tilt the oldest rocks became exposed in the north. These are the bands of shales and ironstones on the northern scarp of the North York Moors and Cleveland Hills. The middle layers form the sandstones of the high moorland and the youngest layers of limestone form the Tabular Hills. In the dales, where the rivers have cut through the younger rocks, there are also exposures of older shales, ironstone and sandstone. Rosedale is an example of this.

During the Quaternary period, the last 2 million years, the area has experienced a sequence of glaciations. The most recent glaciation, the Devensian, ended about 11,000 years ago. The higher parts of the North York Moors were not covered by the ice sheets but glaciers flowed southwards on either side of the higher land mass.

As the climate became warmer at the end of the ice age, the snowfields on the North York Moors began to melt. The meltwater was unable to escape northwards, westwards or eastwards because it was blocked by ice. Huge torrents of water were forced southwards. Water from the Esk valley area flowed southwards gouging out the deep Newtondale valley as it went. Water from the North York Moors formed a vast lake in the area of the Vale of Pickering. Eventually this lake filled its basin and then overflowed at the lowest point which was at Kirkham. Here it cut the steep sided Kirkham gorge. When the ice finally retreated it left deep deposits of boulder clay (or till) behind. The boulder clay blocked the eastern end of the Vale of Pickering causing a permanent deviation in the course of the River Derwent. Alluvium from the glacial meltwater covers many areas to the north of the moors and in the Esk valley.

=== Hills ===
The following summits with more than 30 metres topographic prominence lie within the National Park:

1. Urra Moor (454.6m)
2. Cringle Moor (434.7m)
3. Danby High Moor (432m)
4. Carlton Moor (408m)
5. Noon Hill (404m)
6. Cold Moor (402m)
7. Black Hambleton (400m)
8. Hasty Bank (398m)
9. Boltby Scar (332m)
10. Rievaulx Moor (329.2m)
11. Gisborough Moor (328.7m)
12. Easby Moor (324m)
13. Roseberry Topping (320m)
14. Easterside Hill (319m)
15. Great Ayton Moor (318m)
16. Birk Nab (310m)
17. Heads (308m)
18. Wath Hill (308m)
19. Danby Beacon (301m)
20. Beacon Hill (Ingleby) (299m)
21. Stony Leas (299m)
22. Hawnby Hill (298m)
23. Sleights Moor (297m)
24. Whinny Nab (296m)
25. Coomb Hill (294m)
26. Siss Cross Hill (268.6m)
27. Blakey Topping (267m)
28. Brow Moor (266m)
29. Dunsley Moor (264m)
30. Boon Hill (255m)
31. Hood Hill (253m)
32. Freebrough Hill (250m)
33. Langdale Rigg End (244m)
34. Whorl Hill (237m)
35. Fylingdales Moor (235m)
36. Barns Cliff End (222m)
37. Boonhill (216m)
38. Rockhole Hill (213m)
39. Hodgson Moor (206m)
40. High Rigg (202m)
41. Potato Hill (198.4m)
42. Riccal Heads (198m)
43. Knowle Hill (195m)
44. The Howe (194m)
45. Rowbar Hill (190.2m)
46. Shepherd's Nab (184m)
47. Oak Hill (181m)
48. Kilburn Hill (178.9m)
49. Ashberry Hill (165.7m)
50. Ward Oak Hill (148.2m)
51. Howden Hill (140m)
52. Brink Hill (125m)
53. Beacon Hill (Staithes) (115m)
54. Little Cliff (112.7m)
55. Westfield Hill (88m)

All the summits in the region over 300 metres in altitude lie within the national park.

== Natural history ==
A car driving through the moors, near Goathland

The North York Moors National Park covers an area of 554 square miles (1,436 km^{2}) and encompasses three main types of landscape, whose differences are clearly visible, and the coastal belt. There are predominantly green areas of pasture land, the purple and brown heather moorland, and woodland. The three kinds of scenery are the result of differences in the underlying geology and each supports different wildlife communities. The moorland of the North York Moors covers an area of 440 square kilometres (170 sq mi); making it the largest expanse of heather moorland in England.

=== Moorland ===
Heather moorland, near Castleton

Sandstones erode slowly and form poor acid soils which are deficient in nutrients. They are less permeable to water, impeding drainage and encouraging the formation of bogs. Sphagnum moss bogs are common where there is abundant rain and poor drainage. Cotton grass is a distinctive plant which grows in the boggy areas. In the cold acid waters of peat bogs there is little decomposition of organic material with the result that the dead sphagnum moss gradually accumulates to form peat. This raises the levels of the bogs and they dry out. Heather then invades the area. Large areas of the moorland are now covered in heather, bilberries and grasses growing on thick layers of peat.

The acid soils and peat bogs are unsuitable for earthworms so species which usually feed on earthworms such as moles and the common shrew are absent on the moorland. The pygmy shrew survives by eating the insects and spiders that live in the heather. Lapwing, curlew and redshank breed on the moorland and there are sandpipers along the streams. Wheatear and golden plovers inhabit grassier patches on the moorland and ring ouzels live in stony areas. Red grouse, which feed on young heather shoots, are abundant. The heather is burned in strips by gamekeepers and farmers to encourage new heather growth to feed the grouse. Grouse shooting is part of the moorland economy. About 20 per cent of the national park is covered in bracken. Few things can grow under its dense cover and it does not support many insects and is unpalatable to most animals.

Sheep are a ubiquitous part of the moorland landscape. Their grazing helps to maintain the open wild landscape that is needed for many other plants and animals to thrive.

=== Woodland ===
The North York Moors was once covered in expansive native woodlands entwined with wetland, heathland and bog. Though reforestation efforts are taking place, the regeneration of these ancient woodlands which have been cleared by people over the years have been hindered by overgrazing. Remnants of the ancient, native, woodlands still exist and generally consist of two informal 'types'.

Upland forest is the most widespread native woodland type, consisting of mostly Scots pine and rowan. Other species such as aspen, both downy birch, silver birch, sessile oak, various willow species and a variety of other trees found in Scotland and Northern England. Juniper was also widespread in the North York Moor's uplands, especially in woodland edges, scrubland and heathland growing out of rocky outcrops; this species has seen massive decline in the UK as a whole. The European larch is non-native but naturalised in the UK's uplands and is particularly associated with this national park in the country – it has been recorded to be beneficial to a number species including jays and pine marten. It is said that the park's now extinct populations of red squirrel were often found on larch trees.

The lowland forests of the region found primarily in its dales are home to many of the species found in the uplands, but are also to other species of tree such as pedunculate oak and occasionally the rare wild chequer tree. Yew trees are common too and have heavy ties to the culture and folklore of Yorkshire as a whole.

There is a third major type of woodland: timber plantations. These often consist of the non-native Sitka spruce and Norway spruce and the native Scots pine. The North York Moors National Park is home to two of the largest forests in England, both plantations: Dalby Forest and Cropton Forest; the latter has recently seen the reintroduction of Eurasian beaver.

Fauna in these woodlands is largely the same. Herpetofauna such as adder, common lizard, slowworm, frogs, toads and all three of Britain's native newts can be found here. Various mammals such as red deer, roe deer, fallow deer, pine marten, wood mouse, wild boar and a variety of bats exist in these woodlands just to name a few species. A population of feral British primitive goat exists as a remnant of a once larger population.

=== Limestone belt ===
Limestone weathers quickly to produce nutrient rich alkaline soils on well drained rocks. Gouging by glacial meltwaters has left spectacular valleys along whose floors run streams. The limestone streams with their nutrient rich waters support an abundance of aquatic invertebrates such as insect larvae and crustaceans. These in turn support such fish as trout and grayling. Insects which emerge from the water in summer are also a rich source of food for birds. Grey wagtails, swallows and spotted flycatchers are commonly seen. Dippers and kingfishers are also typical. The otter, after a period of decline, is starting to recolonise the rivers and streams.

Farndale is well known for its wild daffodils in spring. Sheltered woodlands dominated by sessile oaks can be found to the south of the high ground. These woodland areas are the home of pied flycatchers, sparrow hawks and wood warblers. Roe and fallow deer can also be found here. The woodlands and south facing grasslands on the limestone belt provide a good habitat for many butterflies.

The fertile alkaline soils support an abundance of wild flowers. Bluebells and primroses grow in the hedgerows in spring and rarer plants such as the wood vetch and orchids are also to be found. Adders are widespread throughout the national park. On the moors they eat common lizards and around the hedgerows and woodland edges they feed on mice and voles.

The limestone grasslands support a wide variety of wild flowers, and many rarer butterflies can be seen. Pearl-bordered fritillary, Duke of Burgundy fritillary, marbled white, dingy skipper and grayling are just some of species that inhabit the national park.

=== Coast ===
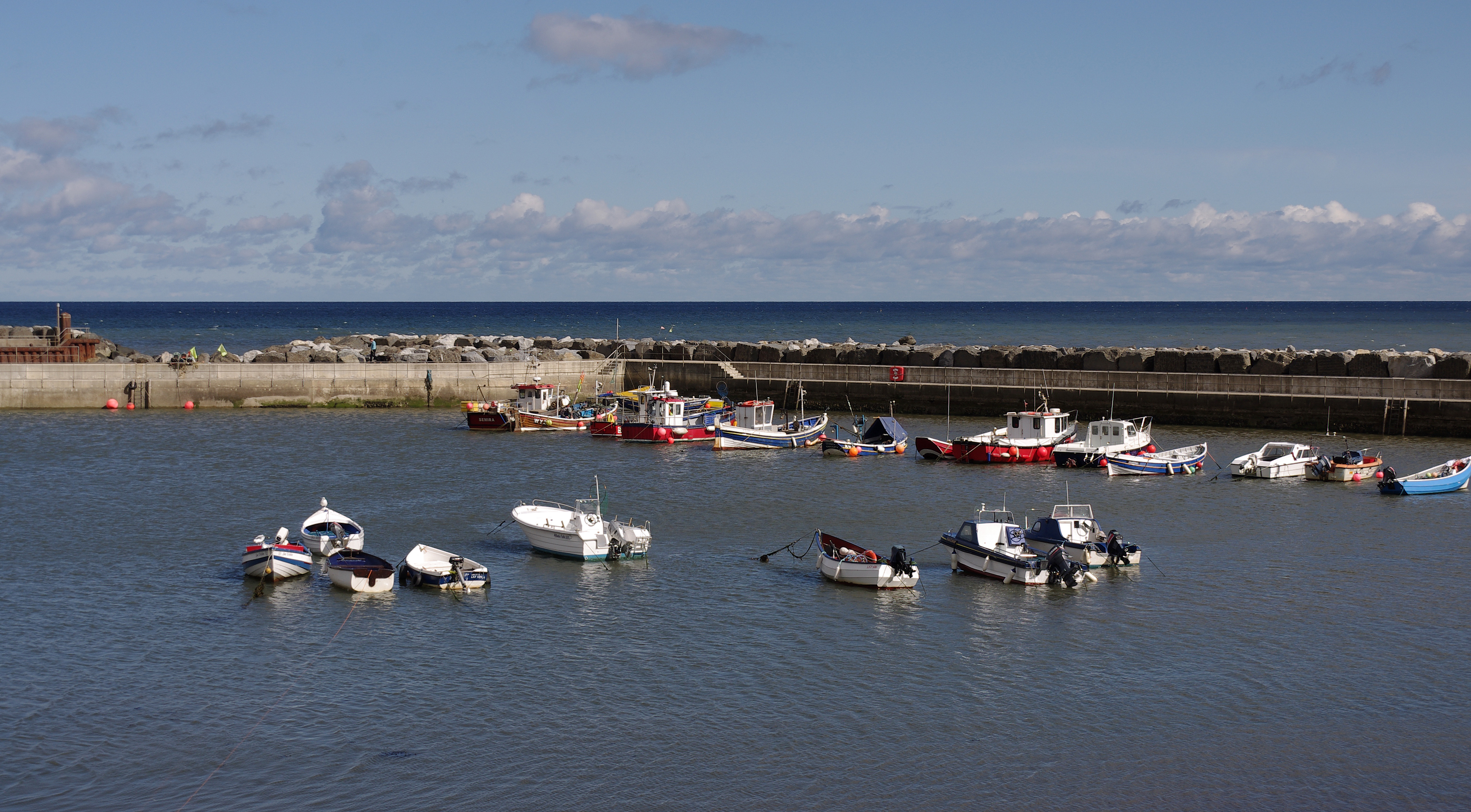
Staithes Harbour

The cliffs and sandy bays of the northern end of the Yorkshire Coast offer an assortment of seashore habitats. An area where the Cleveland Hills meets the sea has been designated as a Heritage Coast. The cliff at Boulby, at 690 feet (210 m), the highest point on the east coast of England is formed by Jurassic shales, clays and ironstones. There are also fine exposures of Jurassic rocks with their characteristic fossils around Robin Hoods Bay and Ravenscar.

Rocky shores offer an abundance of seaweeds in zones of different types which are more and less tolerant of exposure to the air and salt or clear water. Rock pools contain sea anemones, blennies, crabs and molluscs.

Sandy shores harbour a variety of plants and animals which are buried in the sand. Birds such as curlews and oyster catchers are to be seen prodding the sand to find these creatures for food. A few cormorants and fulmars breed along the coast where stonechats and rock pipits can also be spotted. Herring gulls are the commonest breeding birds and are an interesting sight nesting in the chimneys of coastal towns. The common midwife toad has been introduced to the coastal town of Whitby and is largely non-invasive, simply adding to the fauna of the coasts.

== History ==
There are records of 12,000 archaeological sites and features in the North York Moors National Park of which 700 are scheduled monuments. Radio carbon dating of pollen grains preserved in the moorland peat provides a record of the actual species of plants that existed at various periods in the past.

About 10,000 years ago, the cold climate of the ice age ameliorated and temperatures rose above growing point of 5.5 °C (41.9 °F). Plant life was gradually re-established and animals and humans also returned.

=== Mesolithic ===
Around 8,000 BC, Britain was still part of the European landmass, and communities of Middle Stone Age people migrated to England and began to inhabit the North York Moors. Relics of this early hunting, gathering and fishing community have been found as a widespread scattering of flint tools and the barbed flint flakes used in arrows and spears.

=== Neolithic ===
By 5000 BC, as global sea levels rose and the North Sea came into existence, Britain was cut off from mainland Europe. During the New Stone Age, which lasted from around 4500 to 2000 BC, the population increased and agriculture was adopted. These early farmers were the first to destroy the forest cover of the moors. Their settlements were concentrated in the fertile parts of the limestone belt and these areas have been continuously farmed ever since. The Neolithic farmers grew crops, kept animals, made pottery and were highly skilled at making stone implements. They buried their dead in long low burial mounds.

=== Bronze Age ===
Around 2000 BC, the early Bronze Age Beaker People inhabited the Moors. During a 1,400 year period, these people inhabited all areas of the Moors and finally destroyed much of the original forest. The climate was relatively warmer and drier at this time so it was possible to live on the high moors throughout the year. When a piece of land was exhausted of nutrients, these people moved on, leaving behind land that was incapable of supporting anything but a heathland vegetation. There are about 3,000 Bronze Age burial mounds on the moors.

=== Iron Age ===
The Iron Age dates from about 600 BC. There are remains of two promontory hill forts at Boltby Scar and Roulston Scar and a collection of circular stone hut foundations on Percy Rigg. Other evidence of Iron Age occupation is scarce, having been obliterated by subsequent agricultural activity.

=== Roman ===
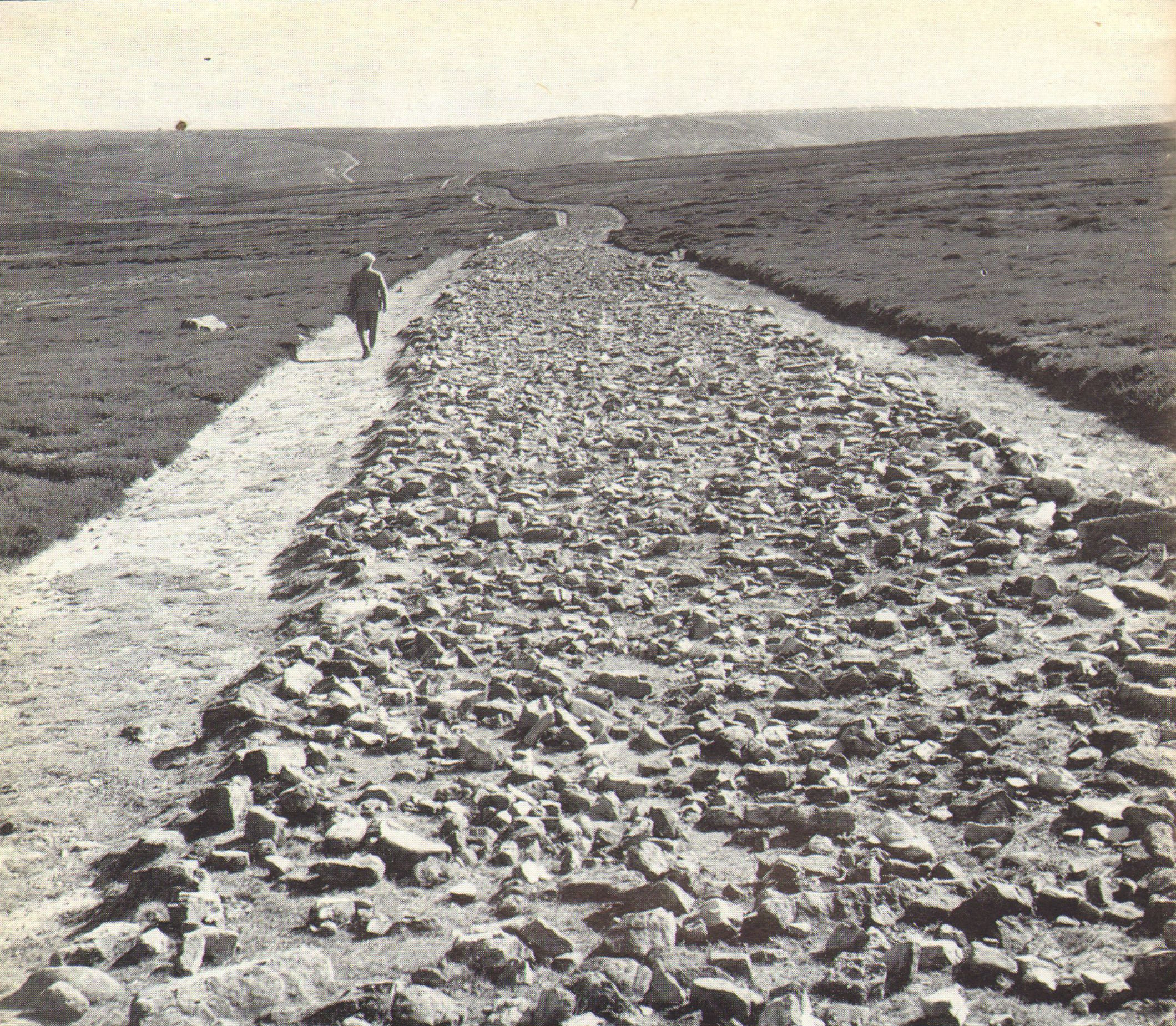
Wade's Causeway, from the 1966 National Park guidebook

By 71 AD, the Roman army had reached Yorkshire, where they established a fort at Malton. Wade's Causeway may have been one of the several Roman roads which radiated from this point. It led north-eastwards over the Vale of Pickering and across Wheeldale Moor towards the North Sea coast. There are Roman camps at Cawthorn and Lease Rigg near Grosmont and signal stations along the coast at Filey, Scarborough, Ravenscar, Goldsborough and Hunt Cliff. The Romans left Britain in 410 AD.

=== Anglo-Saxon and Viking ===
After the departure of the Romans, Germanic tribes arrived and settled in the area. These Angles, Saxons and Jutes gave many of the place names to villages on the moors. They worshipped a number of gods, notably Woden. However, Christianity came to Yorkshire when King Edwin of Northumbria was baptised in 627 AD at York. Christian monasteries were established at Lastingham in 654 and Whitby in 657. A nunnery was built at Hackness in 680.

In the 9th century, Viking raiders began to attack the Yorkshire coast, and in 867 these Danes destroyed the religious houses at Whitby, Lastingham and Hackness and after battle set up a new Danish kingdom based at York. The Danes settled in the area and later themselves became Christian. They introduced their language, elements of which still remain in the local dialect, and renamed a number of settlements.

=== Middle Ages ===
King William I of England and his Norman barons took control of the nation in 1066. Central to the imposition of Norman rule was the building of castles. There are well-preserved castle ruins at Helmsley, Pickering and Scarborough and others existed at Ayton, Danby, Mulgrave and Whorlton. In the 11th and 12th centuries monasteries were established on the moors at Whitby Abbey, Rievaulx Abbey, Byland Abbey and Mount Grace Priory. Gifts of land and money were bestowed on these establishments and the monastic orders became notable landowners, eventually owning about a third of the land in the area. The abbeys managed their land as sheep farms and became very rich on the profits. They continued to take in land from the waste and what remained of the forest and in the process gave the moors the distinctive landscape that still remains. Between 1536 and 1541, Henry VIII of England dissolved the monasteries, and confiscated and sold off their property. This was bought by individual people, some rich, but also some who had been tenants of the monasteries, and became privately owned land.

A wide network of routeways (hollow ways and 'trods' – paved routeways made of flagstones) extend across the North York Moors. While many are medieval in date, some may even pre-date the Roman period.

=== Post-medieval ===
In many areas of the moors and their associated dales the settlements took the form of isolated farms and hamlets rather than villages. Very few had an open field system of agriculture so Enclosure Acts were rarer than in other parts of England. The 17th century saw a major acceleration in the reclaiming of marginal waste land and in the eighteenth century forward looking landlords attempted to improve their lands using drainage schemes and fertilisation measures.

=== 19th century ===
In the 19th century railways were built from Pickering to Whitby (1836), Middlesbrough to Whitby (1865), and Scarborough to Whitby (1885).

Locally sourced iron ore has been processed on the North York Moors from medieval times. In the 19th century it became a boom industry. Dozens of ironstone mines and several short-lived blast furnaces were constructed. Between 1856 and 1926 high-grade magnetic ironstone was mined in Rosedale. A railway was built around the top of the dale to serve the mines, and kilns were built to process the ore. In one decade, the population of the two townships of Rosedale East and Rosedale West rose from 784 in 1861 to 2,839 in 1871. Poor-quality coal was mined in many places on the moors from the 18th century to the early 20th century.

The North York Moors is the only source for British jet. It has been mined in the area from prehistoric times but the industry grew in the middle of the 19th century in response to a fashion for the jewellery produced from it. In the 1880s cheap imports produced a decline in the industry which was focused on Whitby. The remains of alum quarries are to be found to the north of the area and along the coast. Alum was important to the textile industry because it was used as a mordant or fixative for dyes that were used to colour cloth. The industry thrived in the region from the early 17th century until 1871. Its decline came when chemical dyes were discovered. The scars of industrial activity on the moors make it an interesting area in which to pursue industrial archaeology.

== Economy ==
The area's economy is mainly founded on tourism and agriculture.

=== Agriculture ===
Sheep grazing near Castleton

For over a thousand years the basis of the economy in the North York Moors was agriculture. The rural scene, which attracts millions of visitors to the park each year, has been formed and maintained by generations of farmers. The 1996 Agricultural Census recorded a total workforce of 2,913 employed on 1,342 working farms. Sheep and cattle provide the prime source of farm income. The dale farms have rights to graze sheep on the open moor. The rights to moorland grazing are often essential to the economic viability of a farm. In recent years agriculture in Britain has suffered economic setbacks and the viability of hill farming has become questionable. A number of environmental schemes to improve farm incomes have been devised but the industry continues to decline.

Agricultural use of the moors is shared with grouse shooting as a means of gaining financial return from the vast expanse of heather. There is richer farmland across the southern limestone belt, where there are arable and mixed farms as well as the livestock farms. The main arable crops are barley, wheat, oilseed rape, potatoes, and sugar beets. There is also some intensive production of pigs and poultry.

=== Tourism ===
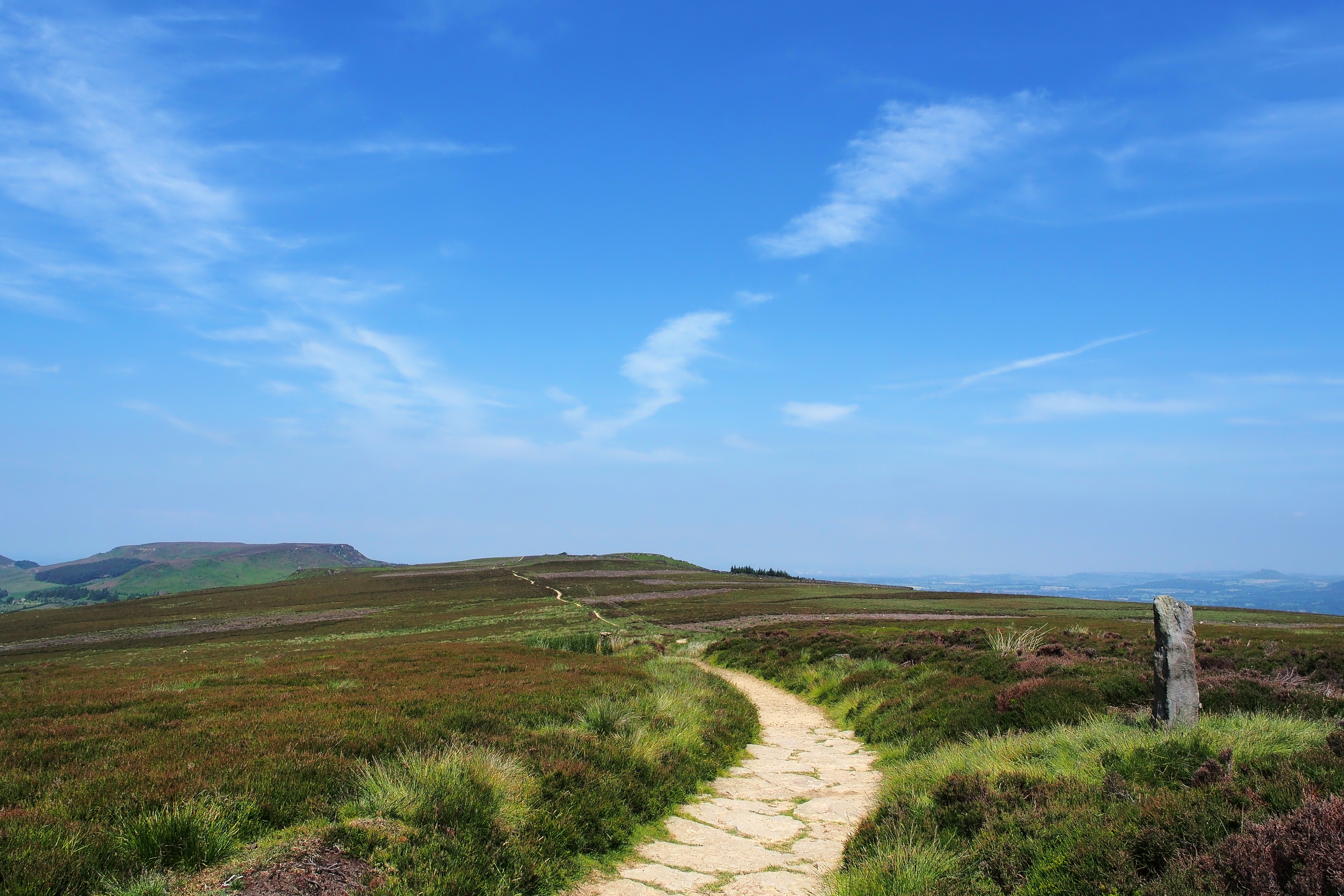
Cleveland Way

Many visitors to the North York Moors are engaged in outdoor pursuits, particularly walking; the National Park has a network of public rights of way almost 1,400 miles (2,300 km) in length, and most of the areas of open moorland are open access under the Countryside and Rights of Way Act 2000. Popular named walks include the Cleveland Way, which circles the North York Moors, including a coastal section; and the Lyke Wake Walk, which leads directly across the heart of the National Park. The route of the White Rose Way, a long-distance walk from Leeds to Scarborough also passes through.

The area also offers opportunities for cycling, mountain biking, and horse-riding, including a circular long distance bridle route created around the North York Moors which can be accessed at a number of locations. The steep escarpments that define the edges of the National Park on three sides are used by several gliding clubs.

In late 2020, the National Park was named as an International Dark Sky Reserve. This honour confirms that the area has "low levels of light pollution with good conditions for astronomy".

The National Park has two visitor centres which have tourist information and exhibitions, as well as a contemporary gallery. These are at:

- Sutton Bank
- The Moors National Park Centre, Danby

=== Entertainment ===
The North York Moors have not changed much in the past 50 years, and are often used as a location for British television programmes and films.

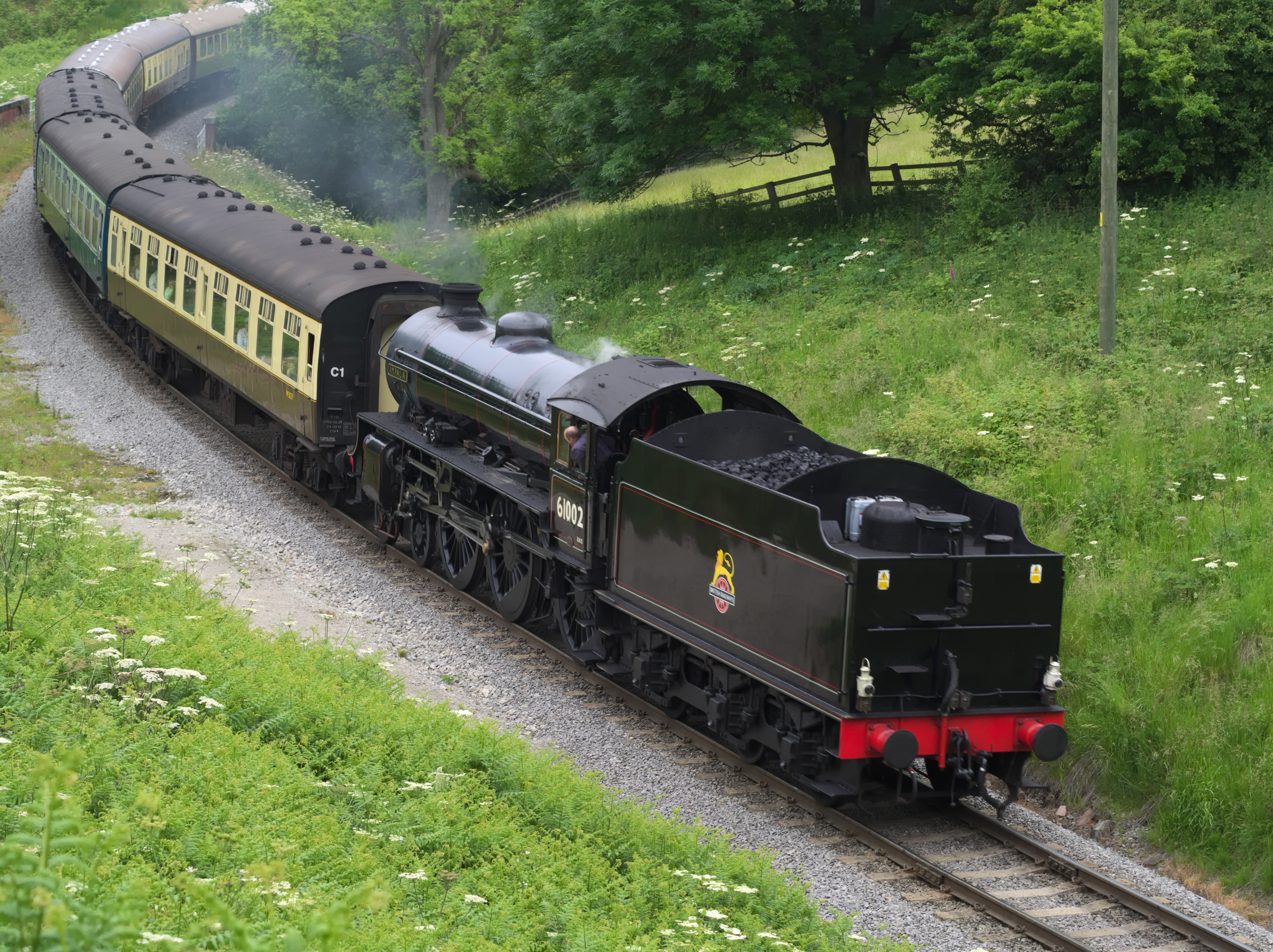
North Yorkshire Moors Railway

The series Heartbeat and the scenes of Hogsmeade Station in the Harry Potter movies were filmed in Goathland. Parts of Phantom Thread (2017) were filmed in Lythe, with a number of other locations in the North York Moors, including Robin Hood's Bay and Staithes. The film version of Downton Abbey shot some scenes at the Pickering station of North Yorkshire Moors Railway. The Runaways with Mark Addy (2020), The Secret Garden with Colin Firth and Julie Walters (2020) and Miss Willoughby and the Haunted Bookshop with Kelsey Grammer, Caroline Quentin and Nathalie Cox (2020) were all partly filmed in the National Park.

Dalby Forest is also host to many forms of entertainment throughout the year including outdoor concerts.

=== Communities ===
There are few major settlements within, or around, the National Park: Helmsley, Pickering, Kirkbymoorside, Guisborough, Stokesley, Northallerton and Whitby. The North York Moors are within a reasonable distance of Redcar and form part of East Cleveland, and are within 20 minutes' driving time from central Middlesbrough and Scarborough.

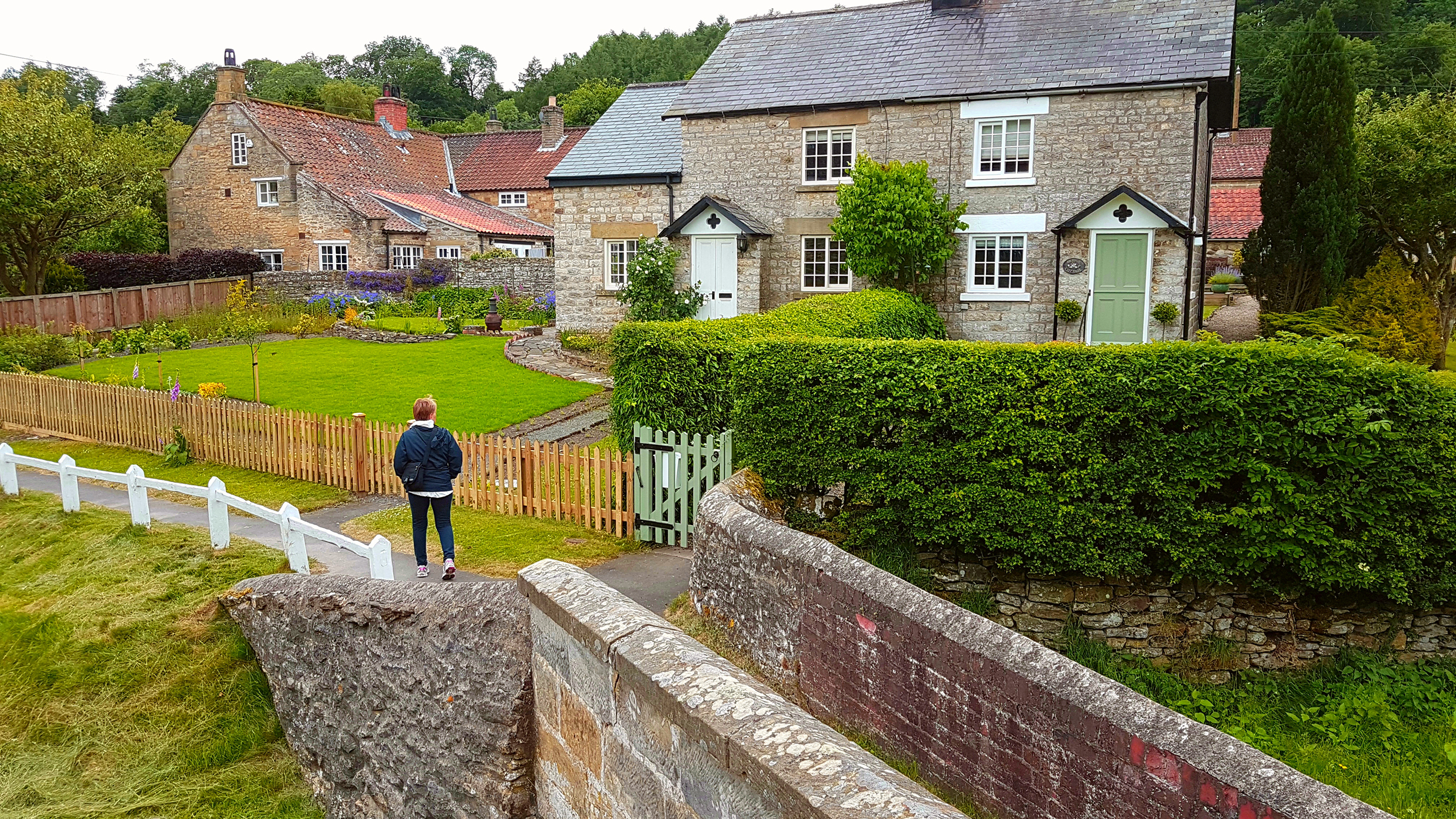
Hutton-le-Hole, village green and beck

- Castleton
- Goathland
- Grosmont
- Helmsley
- Hutton-le-Hole
- Kilburn
- Kirkbymoorside
- Osmotherley
- Pickering
- Robin Hood's Bay
- Swainby
- Whitby

=== Attractions ===
- Byland Abbey
- Cleveland Way (national trail)
- Dalby Forest
- Duncombe Park
- Forge Valley (national nature reserve)
- Farndale local nature reserve
- Helmsley Castle
- National Centre for Birds of Prey, Duncombe Park
- Lyke Wake Walk (long-distance footpath)
- Mount Grace Priory
- Murk Esk (river)
- North Yorkshire Moors Railway
- Ryedale Folk Museum Hutton-le-Hole
- Rievaulx Abbey
- River Derwent
- River Dove
- River Esk
- River Rye
- River Seph
- River Seven
- Rosedale Abbey
- Yorkshire Wildlife Trust Reserves: Ashberry Pastures, Ellerburn Bank, Fen Bog, Garbutt Wood, Hayburn Wyke, Little Beck Wood.

Outside the National Park boundary but nearby:

- Castle Howard
- Eden Camp Museum
- Flamingo Land Theme Park and Zoo
- Whitby Abbey
