= Danby, North Yorkshire =

Village and civil parish in North Yorkshire, England

Coordinates: 54°28′05″N 0°54′32″W

Danby
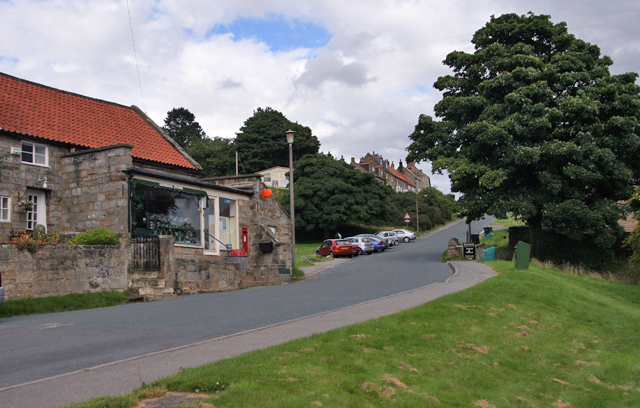
- The village shop and post office

- Location within North Yorkshire
- Population: 1,411 (2011 census)
- OS grid reference: NZ707085
- Civil parish: Danby
- Unitary authority: North Yorkshire
- Ceremonial county: North Yorkshire
- Region: Yorkshire and the Humber
- Country: England
- Sovereign state: United Kingdom
- Post town: WHITBY
- Postcode district: YO21
- Police: North Yorkshire
- Fire: North Yorkshire
- Ambulance: Yorkshire
- UK Parliament: Scarborough and Whitby

Danby is a village and civil parish in the county of North Yorkshire, England. According to the 2011 UK census, Danby parish had a population of 1,411, a reduction on the 2001 UK census figure of 1,515. The statistician Karl Pearson spent a lot of time there.

Danby is located within the North York Moors National Park and is home to Danby Lodge, the Moors' National Park Centre. Danby Lodge is an official Dark Sky site.

Danby is served by a rail network between Middlesbrough and Whitby as well as East Yorkshire's summer seasonal Moors Explorer bus, which links Danby and the surrounding villages with Malton, Beverley and Hull. Danby village incorporates the Duke of Wellington pub and the neighbouring post office. The village lies on the Esk Valley Walk.

The civil parish includes Ainthorpe, Botton, Castleton, Commondale, Danby, Fryup and Westerdale.

The name Danby derives from the Old Norse Danirbý meaning 'village of the Danes'.

== Governance ==
An electoral ward in the same name exists. This ward had a population of 2,072 at the 2011 Census.

From 1974 to 2023 it was part of the Borough of Scarborough, it is now administered by the unitary North Yorkshire Council.

== Danby Castle ==
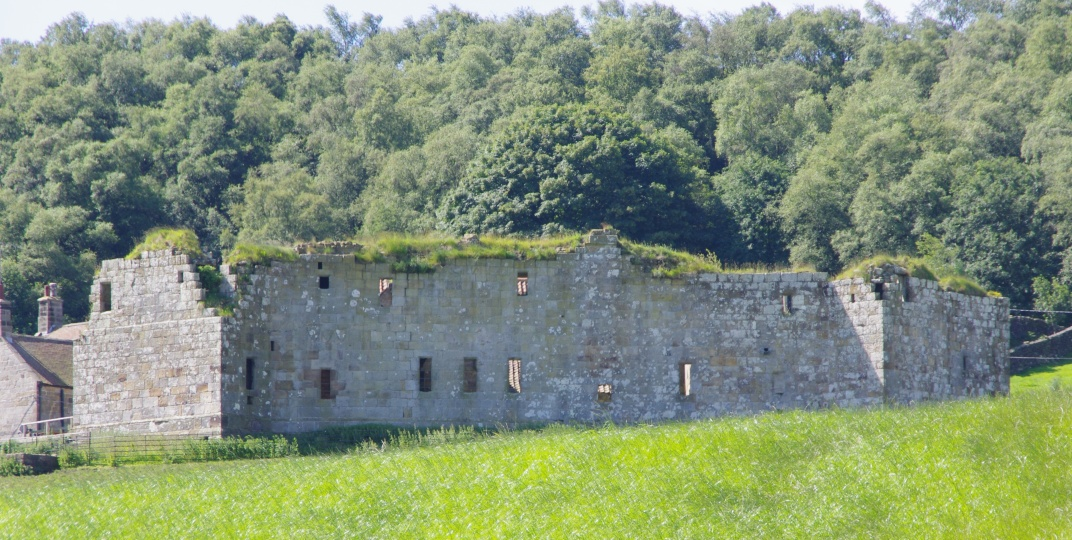
Danby Castle

A little over a mile to the south-east are the remains of Danby Castle.

== Danby Show ==
The Danby Agricultural Show is held every year in August, with traditional country entertainments and activities such as show jumping, sheepdog trials, exhibitions of farm animals and machinery as well as horticultural, craft and produce competitions. The show was inaugurated in 1848 by the then vicar of Danby, Canon John Atkinson, and regularly attracts 6,000 visitors.

== Church history ==
Daniel Duck (1743-?1825) was the vicar of Danby from 1780 until he was succeeded by his son Joseph in 1825. Joseph came from Sidney Sussex College, Cambridge and his family was one of yeoman freeholders in the Yorkshire Dales. He is commemorated in the poem, Lines in Memory of the Rev. D. Duck, Curate of Danby.

- "Yes Daniel, faithful Daniel – gone / We faithfull few lament their loss / No more we fix our eyes upon / That Zealous preacher of the cross." The preface to this poem in the original manuscript had: ”Written on the Back of a pew before divine service while the folk were gathering up. Sunday April 1835.” Daniel Duck's diaries are held by the Whitby Literary and Philosophical Society, which indicates that Daniel was the eldest son of Joseph Duck, yeoman, of Ainthorpe, and Hannah. He was perpetual curate of Danby, first appearing in the church register in February 1780.

The Rev. John Christopher Atkinson was Vicar of Danby 1850–1900 and author of Forty Years in a Moorland Parish, 1891.

== Danby Beacon ==
The Danby Beacon was one of a line of beacons up to 20 miles apart, and dates back to the 1600s when the country was living under the threat of invasion from France. It was to have been lit when the soldier stationed nearby had sight of a foreign fleet. The Beacon is now a landmark that is used as a waymarker by thousands of walkers each year. Over time, the old wooden beacon decayed so much that it fell down and the original landmark was lost.

A new beacon was unveiled in 2008 by Lord Downe, President of the Danby Beacon Trust. The flame-shaped basket is made out of blued stainless steel, blending in with the sky. The flames are mounted around a cup that is decorated with bronze – a reminder of the Bronze Age burial mound which part occupies the site.

During the Second World War, the site became home to one of the first radar stations guarding the north-east coast. The station was responsible for guiding Group Captain Peter Townsend, when he intercepted and shot down the first enemy aircraft to fall on English soil during the war.

The radar station, which continued to function until 1957, was the precursor of the RAF Fylingdales early warning station, 15 miles south-east, whose three giant golf balls became one of the North York Moors National Park's biggest attractions.

== See also ==
- Listed buildings in Danby, North Yorkshire

== Bibliography ==
- Atkinson, John Christopher (1891) Forty years in a Moorland Parish: reminiscences and researches in Danby in Cleveland. London: Macmillan (Atkinson was Vicar 1850–1900; later editions: 1907, 1967 and 1983)
- Michael Stainsby (2006) More Than An Ordinary Man: Life and Society in the Upper Esk Valley, 1830–1910. North York Moors National Park Authority. Helmsley. ISBN 1 904622 08 9
