= Commondale =

Village and civil parish in North Yorkshire, England

Coordinates: 54.485700°N 0.980400°W

- Location within North Yorkshire
- Population: 129 (2011 census)
- OS grid reference: NZ661105
- Civil parish: Commondale
- Unitary authority: North Yorkshire
- Ceremonial county: North Yorkshire
- Region: Yorkshire and the Humber
- Country: England
- Sovereign state: United Kingdom
- Post town: WHITBY
- Postcode district: YO21
- Police: North Yorkshire
- Fire: North Yorkshire
- Ambulance: Yorkshire
- UK Parliament: Scarborough and Whitby

Commondale is a village and civil parish in the county of North Yorkshire, England that lies within the North York Moors National Park.

The village is served by Commondale railway station. It has a small pub called The Cleveland Inn.

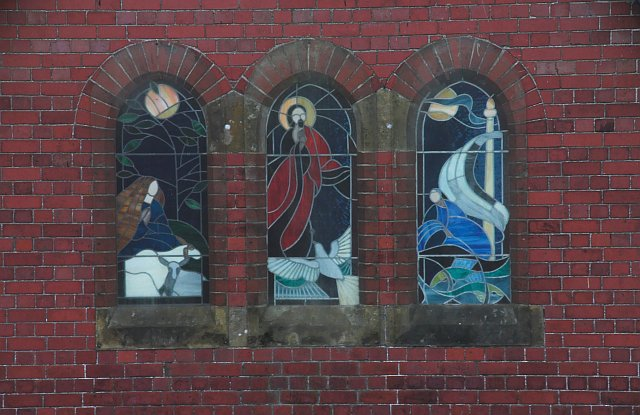
Stained glass windows on the north-east side of Commondale church. Commondale was once a centre of brick-making and the church is unusual in being built in local brick rather than stone.

According to the 2011 UK census, Commondale parish had a population of 129, the same as in the 2001 UK census.

From 1974 to 2023 it was part of the Borough of Scarborough, it is now administered by the unitary North Yorkshire Council.

The village's name was also historically recorded as Colmandale or Colemandale.

Commondale is also the home of the Cleveland County Scouts campsite known as Raven Gill Campsite. This is used by Scouts and other youth groups from all around the world. This provides a good trade for the village pub and also promotes good farming practice in the area.

== See also ==
- Listed buildings in Commondale
