= Delves Cottage =

Cottage in Egton, North Yorkshire, England

Coordinates: 54°25′49″N 0°46′57″W

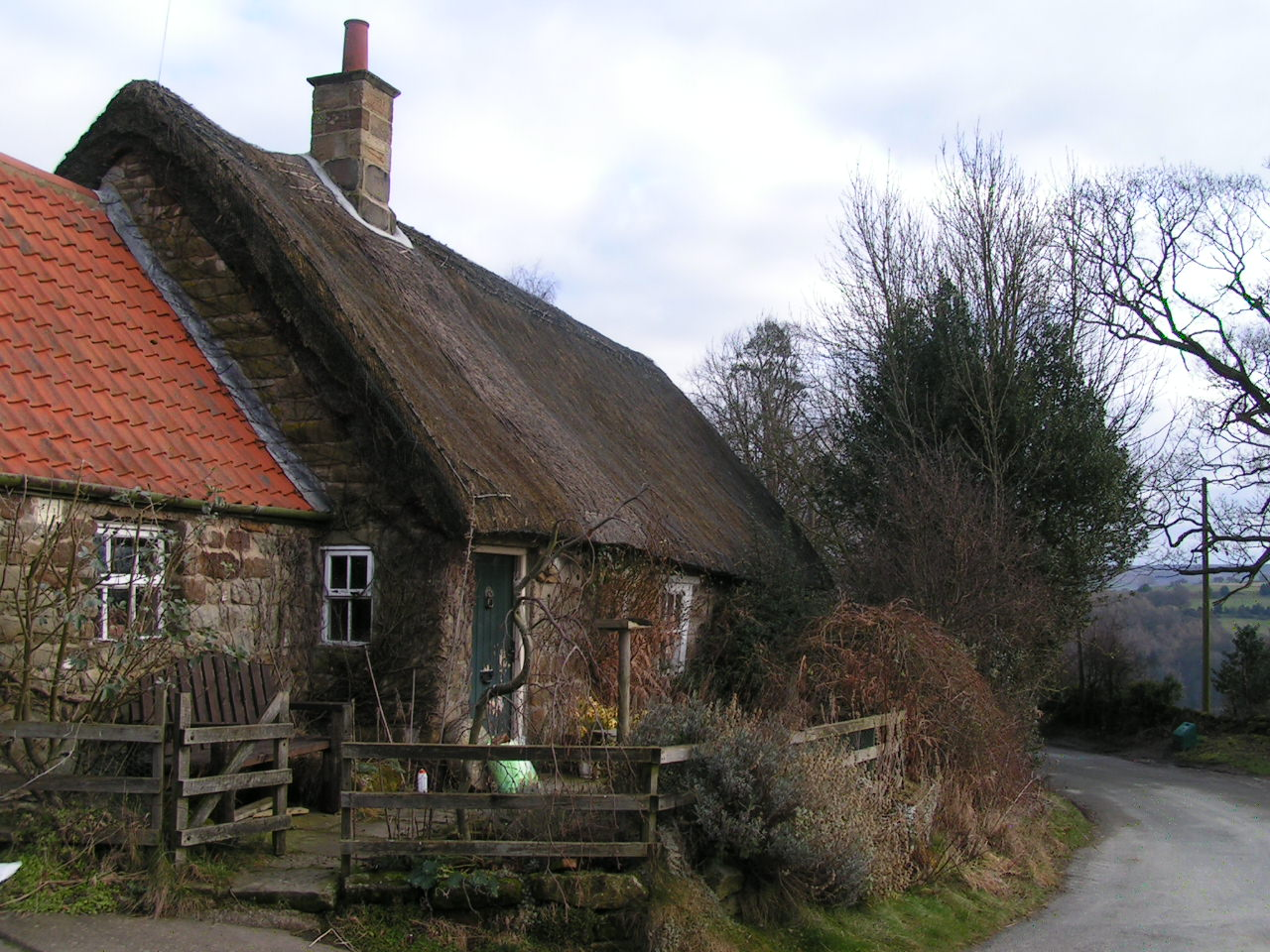
The building, in 2006

Delves Cottage is a historic building in Egton Bridge, a village in North Yorkshire, in England.

The cruck framed cottage was probably built in the 17th century. A chimney was added in 1713. The building was restored and extended between 1975 and 1977, and it was grade II* listed in 1989.

The cottage's wooden frame is encased in sandstone. It has a thatched roof, and an extension with a pantile roof. It has a single storey, 2½ bays, and a lower single-storey single bay extension. On the front is a doorway, a fire window with a chamfered surround, a sash window and a casement window. Inside, there are three pairs of full crucks and an inglenook fireplace with a chamfered bressummer. Next to the fireplace is an early spice cupboard, with a drawer below it. Other early features include a carved witch post, a feature once common in the area, but now the only surviving one in the parish.

It was for many years in the late 19th and early 20th centuries occupied by family of the gamekeepers to the Egton Estate whose smallholding, Delves Farm, was further down the hill towards Egton Bridge.

== See also ==
- Listed buildings in Egton
- Grade II* listed buildings in North Yorkshire (district)
