= Witch post =

Superstition in northern England

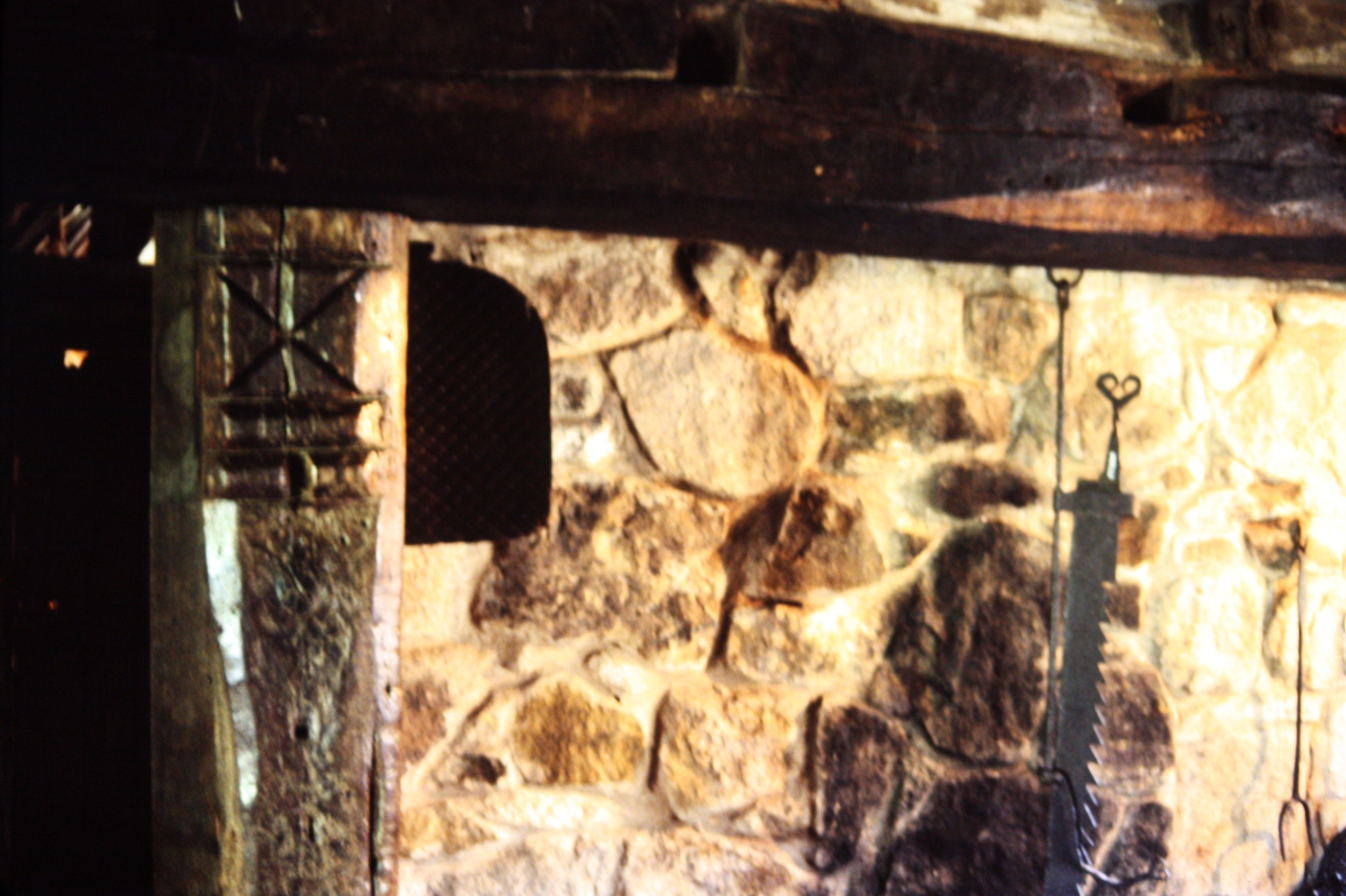
St Andrew's cross carved in fireplace to prevent witches from entering a house, displayed in Ryedale Folk Museum

Witch posts are an architectural feature of houses from rural north Yorkshire. They are wooden posts, found near a house's fireplace and decorated with carvings, particularly a St. Andrew's cross. According to Yorkshire folklore, they protect a house from witches.

== Description ==
Witch posts are wooden posts, originally found on the inglenook near a house's fireplace. Twenty examples are known, with all but one coming from the North York Moors; the exception is from Rawtenstall in Lancashire. The posts were apparently erected in the second half of the 17th century. A lintel from a farmhouse in Glaisdale, apparently made from a repurposed witch post, has the date 1664 carved into it; the Lancashire witch post is inscribed 1691.

Witch posts are decorated with carvings, including a St. Andrew's cross at the top of the post. They are often carved with a number of horizontal lines. An example from Glaisdale has a flower motif between two St. Andrew's crosses, and is inscribed with the initials EPIB; one originally from Scarborough and now in the Pitt Rivers Museum in Oxford has heart motifs. Though often said to be made of rowan wood, where they have been checked they have been found to be made of oak, like other timbers in the house. The posts are often re-used as lintels.

There are witch posts in the collections of the Ryedale Folk Museum in Hutton-le-Hole and Whitby Museum, both in North Yorkshire, and the Pitt Rivers Museum, Oxford.

== Function ==
Witch posts are commonly believed to have had a protective function against witches. Mary Nattrass, one of the first to research witch posts, interviewed a stonemason from Egton in the North York Moors who said that they prevented a witch from travelling through the house and out up the chimney, and thus gaining power over it. Carved posts with a similar function are known in Wales, where phallic or hermaphroditic figures are carved on either side of a doorway, and the Netherlands, where posts called steipelteken carved with saltires are known starting in the sixteenth century.

This apotropaic interpretation of witch posts has more recently been questioned. The historian of witchcraft Owen Davies describes it as "riddled with problems". Nineteenth-century books on Yorkshire folklore do not mention witch posts. The first known use of the term was by John Christopher Atkinson, the vicar of Danby, who donated a witch post to the Pitt Rivers Museum in Oxford in 1893; in his letter accompanying the post he described it as "the (assumed) witch post ... so far there is no actual evidence of its original intention".

Rather than protection against witches, Peter Walker has suggested that the posts were intended to identify the household as Catholic recusants who had hosted the priest Nicholas Postgate. Others have doubted that recusants would want to advertise their illicit behaviour with witch posts, which would have been both very obvious to any visitor to the house and semi-permanent where other examples of recusant identifying marks are both more temporary and more easily deniable. Christiane Kroebel alternatively proposes that the carvings were entirely ornamental.

== Works cited ==
- Angus, Bill (2 January 2018). "The Apotropaic "Witch posts" of Early Modern Yorkshire: A Contextualization". Material Religion. 14 (1): 55–82. doi:10.1080/17432200.2017.1418477.
- Davies, Owen (2015). "The Material Culture of Post-Medieval Domestic Magic in Europe: Evidence, Comparisons, and Interpretations". In Boschung, Dietrich; Bremmer, Jan (eds.). The Materiality of Magic. William Fink. pp. 379–421.
- Hayes, R. H.; Rutter, J. G. (1972). Cruck-framed Buildings in Ryedale and Eskdale. Scarborough: Scarborough and District Archaeological Society.
- Hoggard, Brian (2019). Magical House Protection: The Archaeology of Counter-Witchcraft. La Rochelle: Berghahn Books. ISBN 9781836959687.
- Kroebel, Christiane (2016). "The Whitby Museum Witch Post: a Reconsideration". Forum: The Journal of Council for British Archaeology Yorkshire. 5: 55–58.
- Nattrass, Mary (1962). "Witch Posts". Gwerin: A Half-Yearly Journal of Folk Life. 3 (5): 254–267.
