= Egton Manor =

Manor house in North Yorkshire, England

Coordinates: 54°26′08″N 0°45′38″W

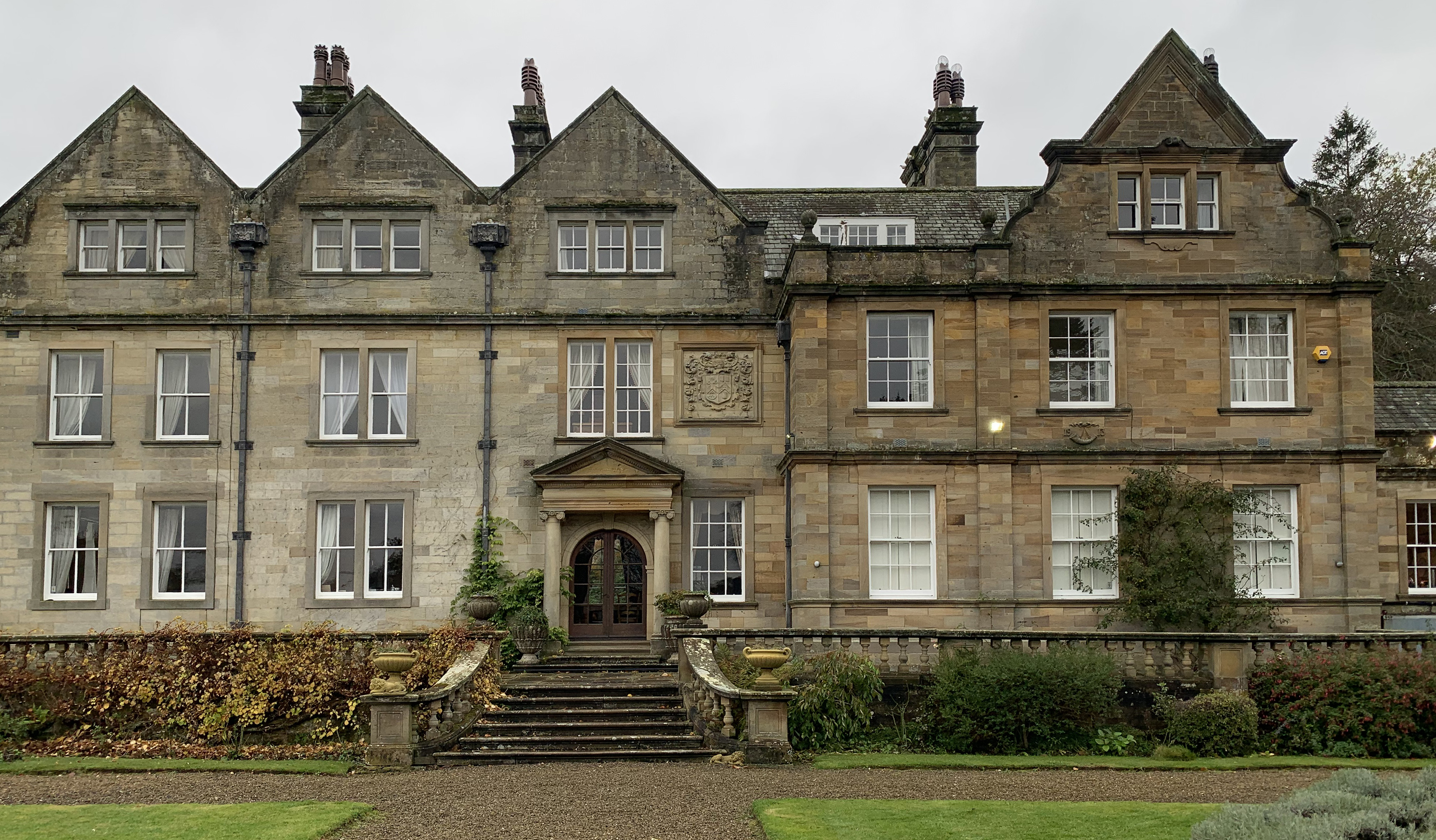
- Interactive map of the Egton Manor area

General information
- Type: Country House
- Location: Egton Bridge, North Yorkshire Moors, England
- Construction started: 1869
- Renovated: 1913
- Demolished: 1979 (partial demolition)
- Owner: Foster family

Technical details
- Structural system: Stone

Design and construction
- Awards: Grade II

Website
- www.egtonestate.co.uk

Egton Manor is an historic country house near the village of Egton Bridge, on the banks of the River Esk in the North Yorkshire Moors. The Grade II listed building was built in 1869 by the Foster family, whose descendants still live there today. Egton Manor, which is listed in the Domesday Book, lies at the heart of the 6,000 acre Egton Estate.

== History ==
=== Norman Conquest ===
The manor of Egton is mentioned in the Domesday Book; in 1086 it measured four leagues by two leagues, and the "pasturable woodland" three leagues by two leagues. In 1086 the lord of Egton was Robert, Count of Mortain, half-brother of William the Conqueror. Prior to the Conquest the manor was held by Swen. Later, Egton fell into the hands of the Fossard family, the de Turnhams, the de Mauleys, and eventually the Salvins.

=== 17th, 18th and 19th centuries ===
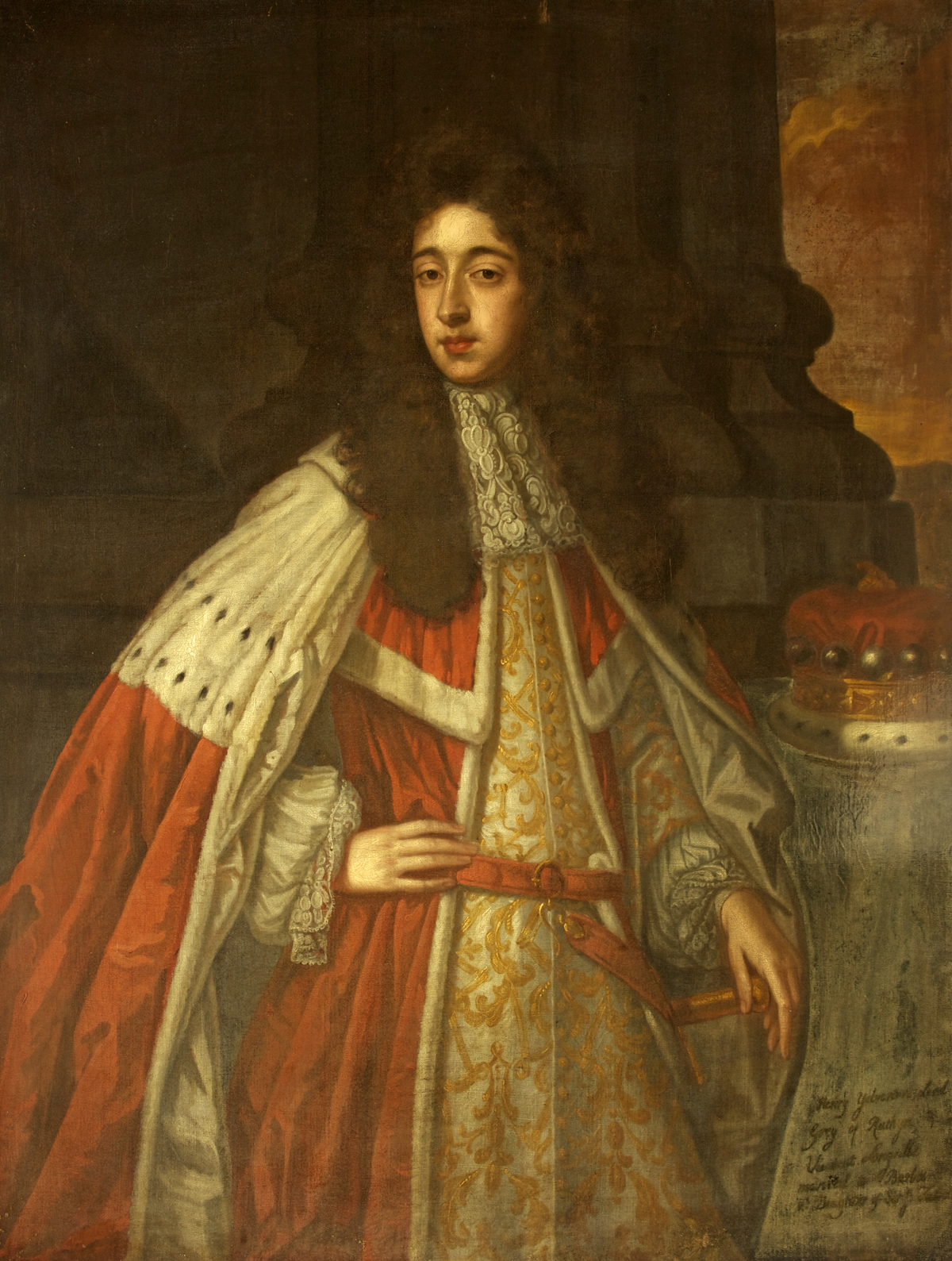
Henry Yelverton, 1st Viscount Longueville, Lord of Egton

By 1686 the manor was in the possession of Henry Yelverton, Baron Grey of Ruthin, who was created the first Viscount Longueville in 1690. Henry's son and heir was Talbot Yelverton, 1st Earl of Sussex, who was Lord of the Bedchamber from 1722 to 1727, Knight, Order of the Bath in 1725, Deputy Earl Marshal from 1725 to 1731 and a Privy Counsellor in 1727. The Yelvertons were absentee landlords, making only rare visits to Egton.

In 1730 Talbot Yelverton sold Egton Manor for £38,000 to Robert Elwes of Twickenham, who had made a fortune in goldsmithing and gold merchandising; he died in February 1752. From 1730 to 1869 Egton Manor would be owned by the Elwes family. Robert Elwes left the estate to his son Cary Charles Elwes, who died in 1782, leaving the estate in turn to his son Robert Cary, father of Cary Charles Elwes, who died in 1866. Cary Charles Elwes was succeeded by his son Valentine Dudley Henry Cary Elwes.

=== Foster family ===
In 1869 Valentine Dudley Henry Cary Elwes, the last Elwes owner of Egton, sold the estate to the wealthy mill owner John Foster of Queensbury, Bradford, who purchased the Egton Estate at auction with his brothers Johnston Jonas Foster, Abraham Briggs Foster, and John Foster the Younger as a sporting estate. The Foster brothers were Anglicans and self-made industrialists, possessors of a textile-generated fortune.

At this time Egton Estate comprised 12,480 acres, and was bought for £155,100, a very large sum at the time. The Fosters lived in Hipperholme, by now a three-hour railway journey to Grosmont railway station. Initially the Fosters lodged at Bridgeholme Green, before beginning construction of Egton Manor House.

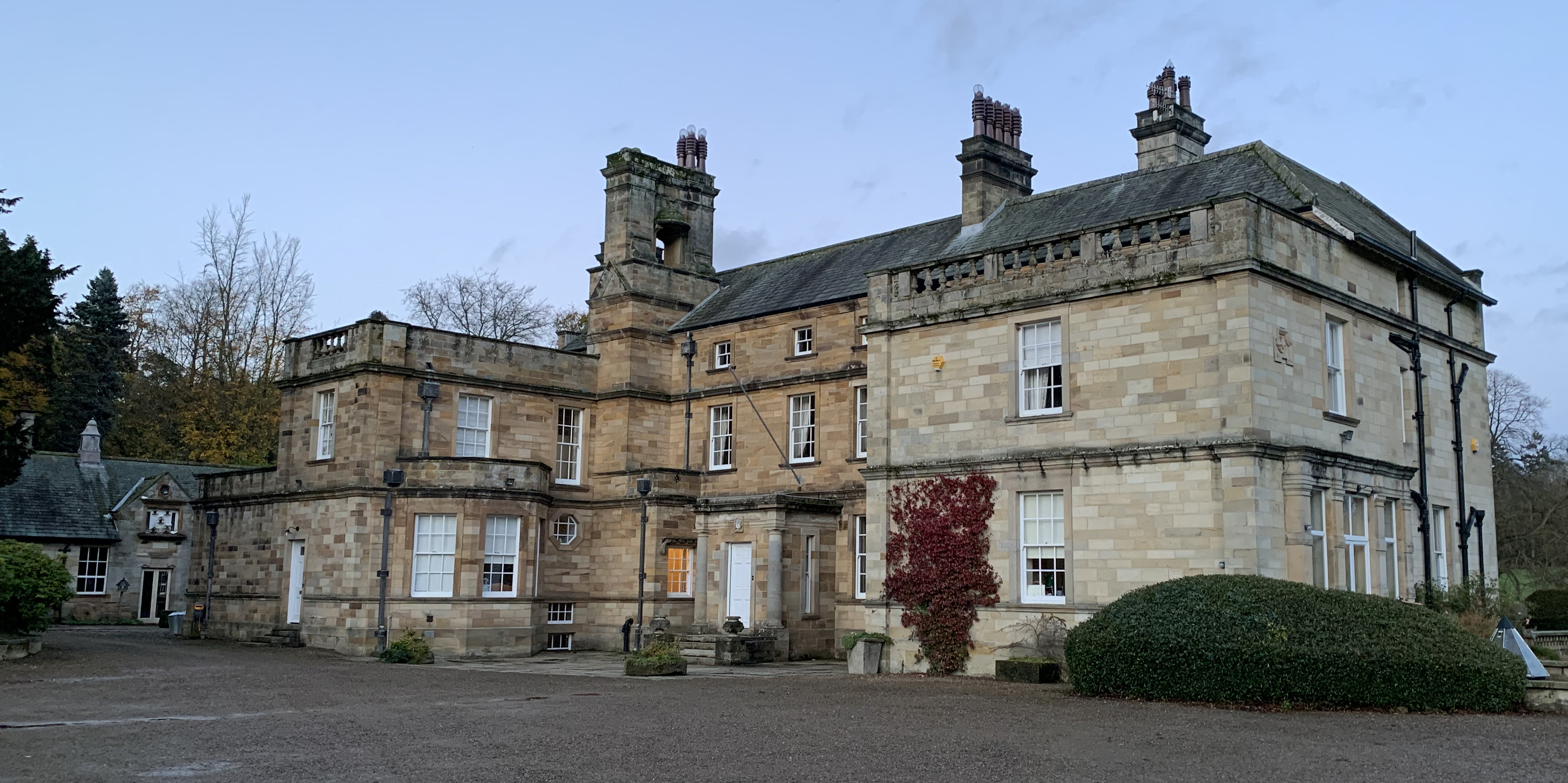
Egton Manor Viewed from the south

Egton Manor was built in 1893; the building is of hammered sandstone with sandstone ashlar dressings and slate roofs.

Over time three of the Foster brothers sold their interest in the estate, leaving the youngest John Foster the sole owner. The Fosters were philanthropic landowners, rebuilding many of the estate's agricultural buildings and providing the community with a new church, St Hilda's Church, Egton and a new school.

=== 20th century ===
Egton Manor was enlarged in 1913, with extensions and rebuilding in herringbone-tooled sandstone. On the death of John Foster the estate was inherited by his son Martin Foster, and later by his son Simon Foster. On 19 February 1952 Egton Manor became a Grade II Listed Building. In 1979 major remodelling and partial demolition took place. Since around 1980 the Estate has been run as a commercial operation.

Martin John Clavel Foster, Lord of the Manor of Egton 1912 - 1976

=== Today ===
Today Egton Manor lies at the heart of North Yorkshire Moors in an area of outstanding natural beauty, part of the North York Moors National Park. It is located approximately six miles from the town of Whitby. Amenities include shooting and fishing; the estate also hosts weddings and other events. Egton is notable for its wild salmon runs on the River Esk.

== See also ==
- Listed buildings in Egton

== Gallery ==
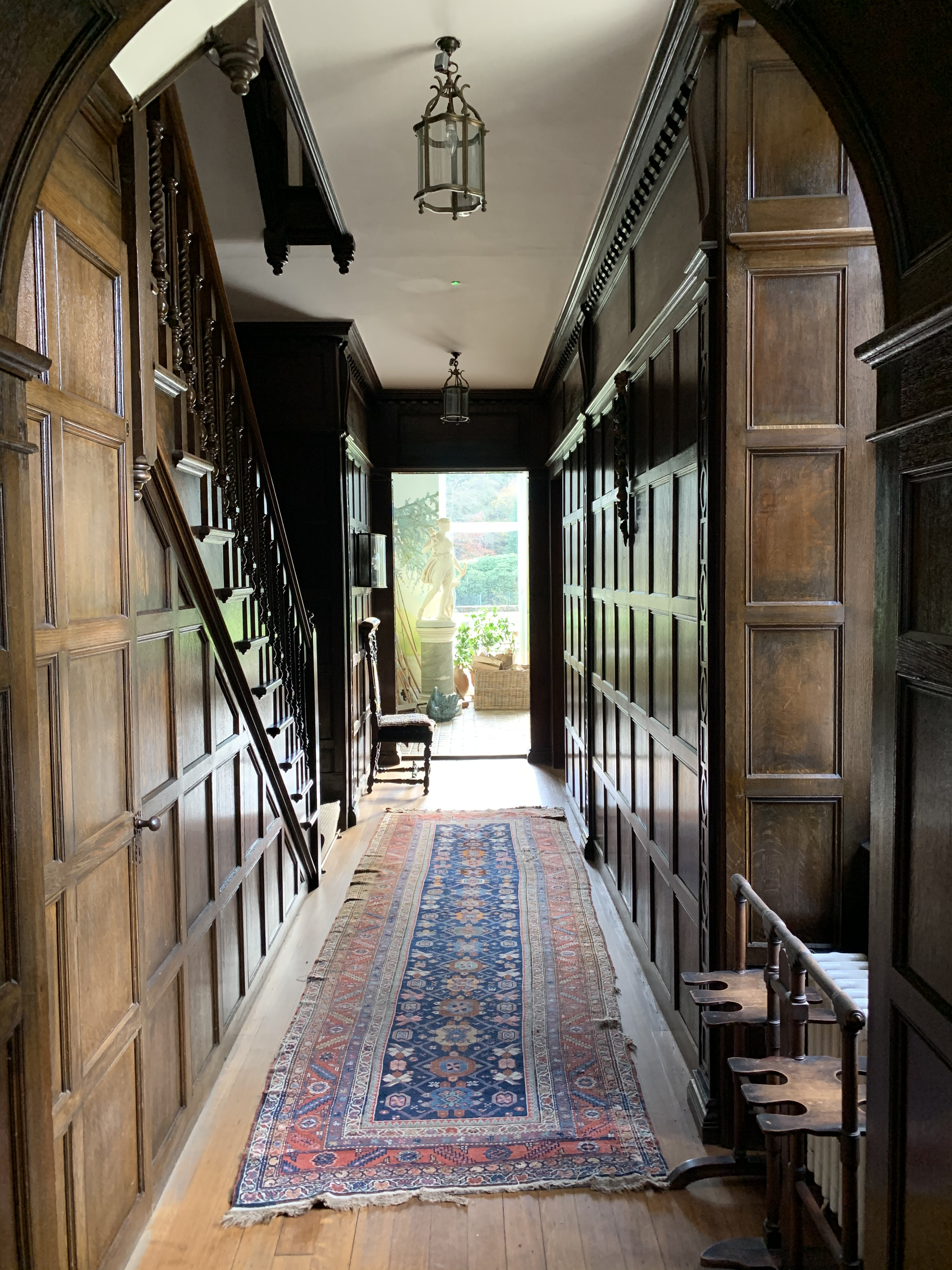
Hallway at Egton Manor

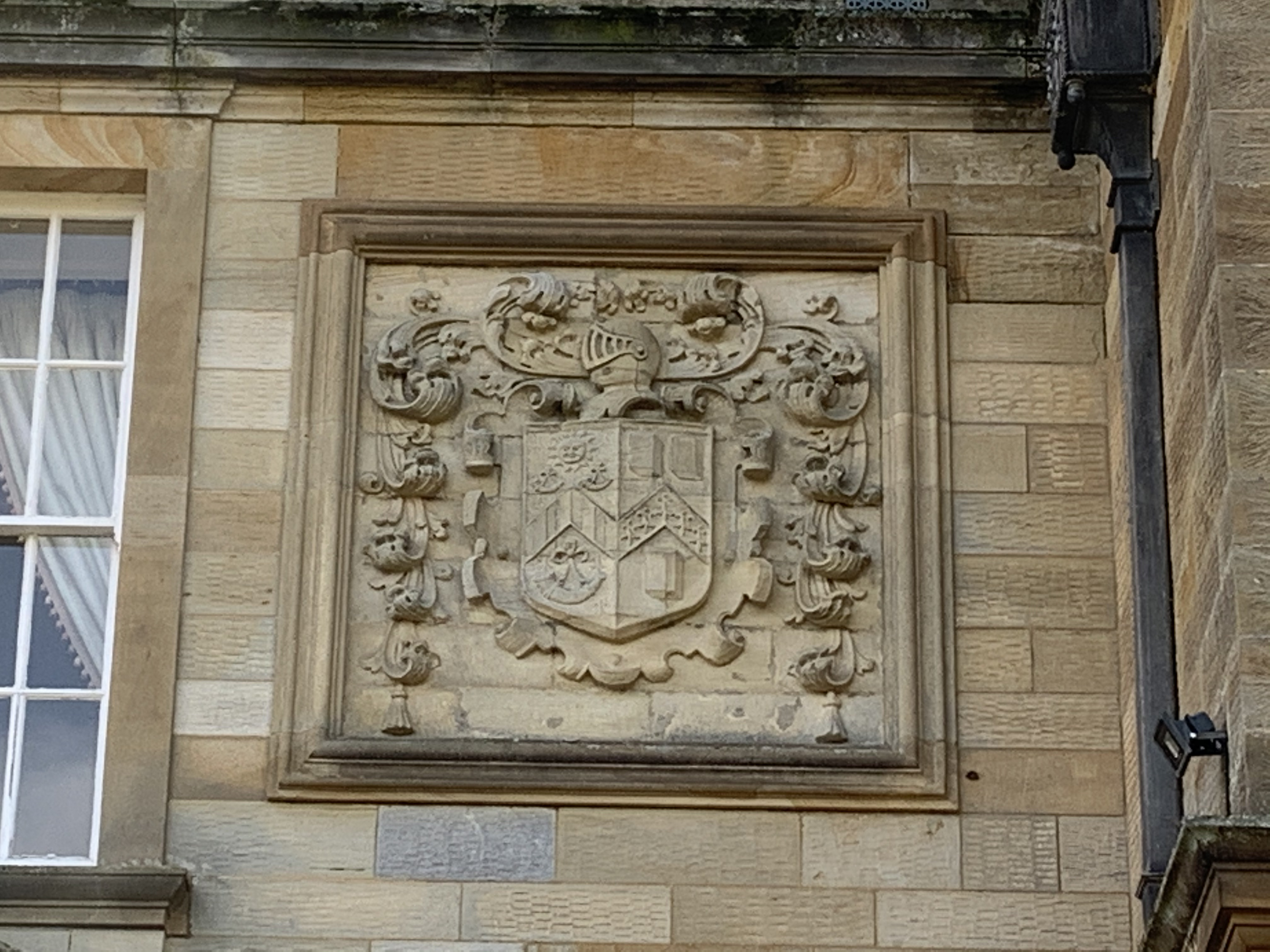
Foster Arms

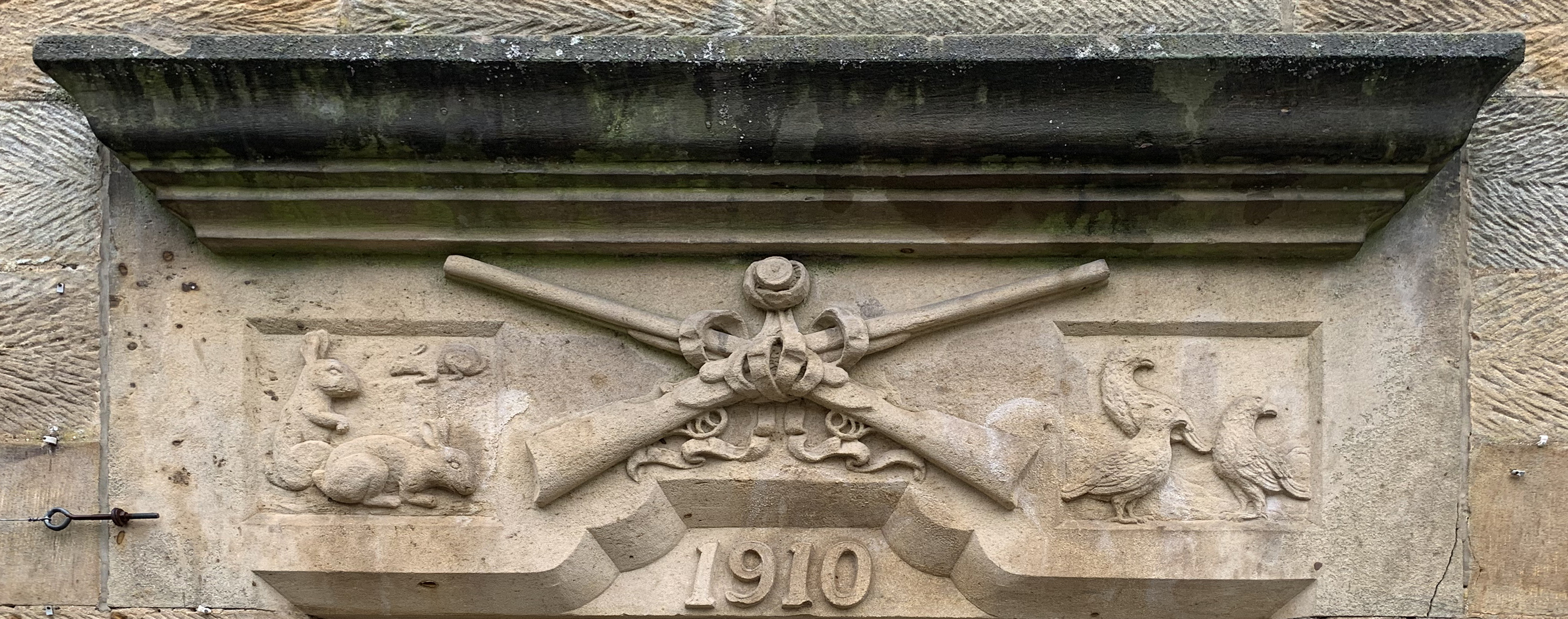
Architectural detail

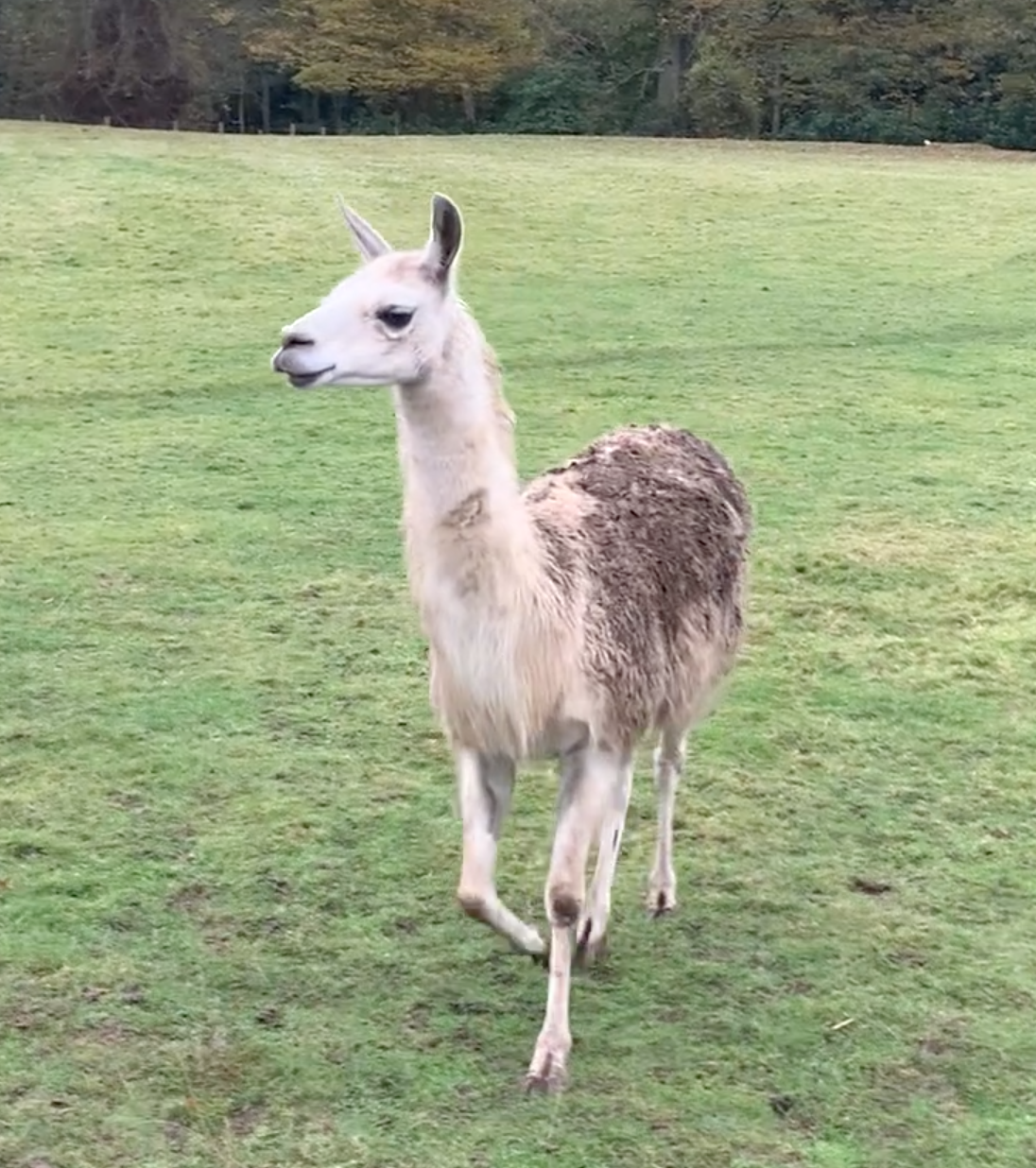
Llama at Egton Manor
