= Ryedale Folk Museum =

Open-air museum in the village of Hutton-le-Hole, England

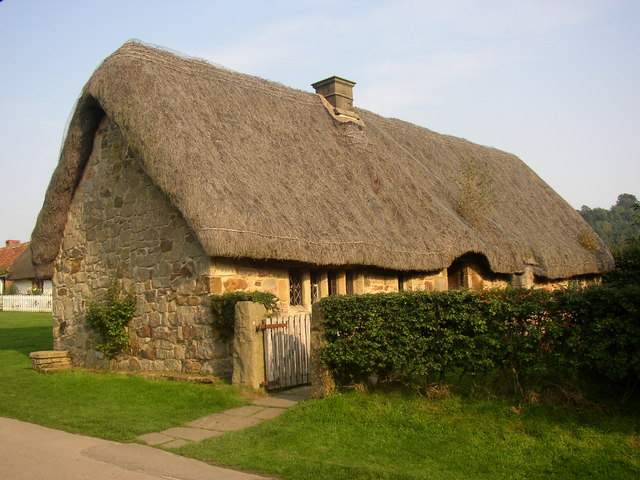
- Cruck-framed cottage from Stang End in Ryedale Folk Museum
- Established: 1964
- Location: Hutton-le-Hole in the North York Moors National Park
- Coordinates: 54.300°N 0.920°W
- Website: www.ryedalefolkmuseum.co.uk

Ryedale Folk Museum is an open-air museum in the village of Hutton-le-Hole in the North York Moors National Park. This museum tells the stories of local people from pre-history to the present day. About twenty of the museum's buildings have been saved from nearby villages and reconstructed at the museum. The museum buildings and estate occupy an area of six acres.

== Background ==
Local resident Wilfred Crosland originally acquired a collection of regional rural artefacts and from 1935 onwards, made arrangements to display them from time to time, until the start of World War II. After Wilfred died in 1961, his sisters, Helen and Hannah (known as Minnie), developed his idea for a museum, and they appointed Bertram (Bert) Frank as its first curator. Bert Frank was supported by his wife, Evelyn, alongside countless volunteers. One room was used from 1962.

== History ==
Signage referring to the "Ryedale Folk Museum" was first erected in 1963 and the museum officially opened in March 1964. A Look North TV crew attended in April 1964.

In 2023, the museum hosted an exhibition of traditional rag rugs made by a local couple focused on preserving the craft.

In 2024, an exhibition titled Believe it or Not explored folk belief and magical thinking, with exhibited items including witch posts and everyday domestic items believed to have protective powers, such as knitting sheaths, apple scoops, and butter moulds.

== The buildings at the Museum ==
There are many different buildings at the Museum. Some have been relocated from nearby villages, others have been purpose built to serve the needs of the Museum and collections on display. The buildings include:

- Stang End cottage, bearing a witch post.
- Pickard's Cottage
- Manor House or Harome Hall
- Washhouse
- William Hayes' Daylight Photographic Studio
- an Iron Age roundhouse
- a Crofter's Cottage
- a Witch's Hovel
- a Shepherd's Hut
- a potting shed
- workshops for the cobbler, tinsmith, cooper, joiner and wheelwright, saddler, iron foundry and undertaker
- a working blacksmith's shop.

There are also agricultural machinery and farm animals (sheep, chickens and pigs) on the estate.

== Television and Film ==
The Museum has featured in various television programmes including Escape to the Country, BBC Look North and Secret Britain. In January 2026 it was seen on Robson Green's programme, Weekend Escapes, on BBC2. Robson Green and Chris Kamara visited the museum and made a traditional bee skep from wheat straw with one of the Museum's volunteers.

The Museum has been used in various films and features including the BBC's production of Death Comes to Pemberley and Nandor Fodor and the Talking Mongoose starring Simon Pegg and Minnie Driver.
