= Horseshoe Hotel =

Listed pub in North Yorkshire, England

- The pub in 2017
- Interactive map of the Horseshoe Hotel area

General information
- Type: Hotel and public house
- Location: Egton Bridge, North Yorkshire, England
- Coordinates: 54.43568°N 0.76642°W
- Year built: Early 19th century
- Renovated: Late 19th century (altered and extended); 20th century (altered)

Design and construction
- Designations

Listed Building – Grade II
- Official name: The Horse Shoe Hotel
- Designated: 6 October 1969
- Reference no.: 1316157

Website
- horseshoehotel.co.uk

The Horseshoe Hotel is a public house in Egton Bridge, a village in North Yorkshire, in England.

The building was constructed in the early 19th century. It was altered and extended later in the century, and further altered in the 20th century. It was Grade II listed in 1969. The business was sold in 2020, at which time, it was a free house with two bars, a dining room, and six hotel rooms, along with two rooms used as accommodation by the owners. In 2021, the new owners competed on the Four in a Bed TV show.

At the rear of the building, a summerhouse was constructed in the 1930s, which was initially used to host the annual Egton Bridge Gooseberry Show. During the Second World War it was commandeered as a first aid post, then after the war served as staff accommodation, an ice cream shop, and then a holiday let, before becoming a farm shop. In 2020, a wooden bar building was added.

The pub is built of sandstone, and has a pantile roof with coped gables, shaped kneelers and ball and pedestal finials. There are two storeys and attics, a main front of four bays, a lean-to on the left, and a rear wing with two storeys and two bays. The central doorway has a shaped tooled lintel, to its left is a fire window, to the right is a canted bay window, the other windows are tripartite, and in the roof are two flat dormers with casements. In the right gable end is a relief "F" in a circular surround with keystones.

== See also ==
- Listed buildings in Egton
