= St Hedda's Church, Egton Bridge =

Church in Egton, North Yorkshire, England

Coordinates: 54°26′12″N 0°45′42″W

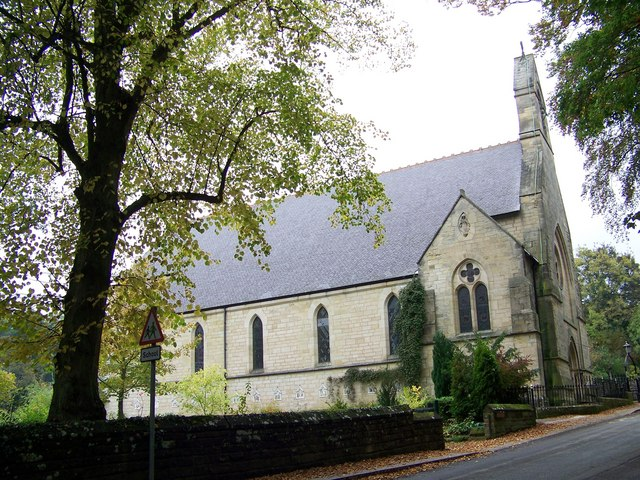
The church, in 2011

St Hedda's Church is a Catholic parish church in Egton Bridge, a village in North Yorkshire, in England.

A Catholic chapel was in existence in Egton Bridge by 1743, and it was replaced by a church in 1790. In 1867, it was replaced by the current, larger, church, while the old church was converted into St Hedda's Catholic Primary School. The church was designed by Hadfield and Son. A pieta with a timber canopy were added to the west end in 1900. The building was grade II listed in 1998.

The church is built of stone with Welsh slate roofs and terracotta ridge tiles. It consists of a nave, north and south aisles, a chancel and an apse. At the west end is a pointed arch rising to a gabled bellcote with a cross finial, and a doorway with a pointed moulded arch with a hood mould and columns, above which is a circular window. Most of the other windows are lancets. Inside, there is an organ gallery at the west end, and the original wooden pews and octagonal pulpit. There is a wooden barrel vaulted roof, with decoration applied by stencil. The chancel is lavishly decorated, including a painted and gilded altar and reredos. The font is circular and was made of stone in about 1790, probably having been relocated from the old church.

In the north aisle is a stained glass window dedicated to Blessed Nicholas Postgate, designed and made by the artist Thomas Denny and installed in 2011. Postgate, who was born to a family from Egton Bridge, was a Catholic priest who ministered to communities across the North York Moors and was executed during the anti-Catholic persecutions of 1679.

== See also ==
- Listed buildings in Egton
- Hædde
