= Clootie =

A clootie is Scots for a rag or cloth. Clootie may refer to

- Clootie dumpling, a spiced suet fruit pudding boiled in a cloth
- Clootie well, a sacred well where strips of cloth are left for healing
- Clootie rug, a rag rug
