= Listed buildings in Egton =

Egton is a civil parish in the county of North Yorkshire, England. It contains 45 listed buildings that are recorded in the National Heritage List for England. Of these, two are listed at Grade II*, the middle of the three grades, and the others are at Grade II, the lowest grade. The parish contains the villages of Egton and Egton Bridge, and the surrounding countryside. Most of the listed buildings are houses, cottages and associated structures, farmhouses and farm buildings. The other listed buildings include public houses, churches and associated structures, a series of waymarkers, a boundary stone, a milepost, a bridge, a school and a memorial cross.

== Key ==
Grade	Criteria
II*	Particularly important buildings of more than special interest
II	Buildings of national importance and special interest

== Buildings ==
Name and location	Photograph	Date	Notes	Grade
Beggar's Bridge; 54.43866°N 0.79211°W		1619	A packhorse bridge over the River Esk, in sandstone, 6.5 feet (2.0 m) wide, and dated, with a coat of arms. It consists of a single segmental arch with voussoirs, an arched ring, and a peaked parapet with chamfered coping. It has a paved pathway between coped abutments.	II*
Cross View; 54.44641°N 0.75545°W	—	17th century (or earlier)	The cottage is cruck-framed, it is encased in sandstone, and has a thatched roof. There is a single storey and five bays. On the front is a doorway and windows, including sashes, one horizontally-sliding, a fire window and a tripartite window. Inside, there is a pair of crucks, and a reconstructed inglenook fireplace.	II
Delves Cottage; 54.43024°N 0.78264°W		17th century	The cottage is cruck-framed, it is encased in sandstone, it has a thatched roof, and an extension with a pantile roof. There is a single storey, 2½ bays, and a lower single-storey single bay extension. On the front is a doorway, a fire window with a chamfered surround, a sash window and a casement window. Inside, there are three pairs of full crucks and an inglenook fireplace with a chamfered bressummer.	II*
Newbiggin Hall; 54.45012°N 0.70463°W		Late 17th century	A manor house, later a farmhouse, in sandstone with a pantile roof, coped gables and block kneelers. There is a U-shaped plan, the middle range with two storeys and two bays, and flanking gabled cross-wings with two storeys and attics and one bay. In the centre is a doorway with a quoined and chamfered surround, and the windows are sashes. At the rear is a basement and a two-light mullioned window.	II
Farm buildings east of Newbiggin Hall; 54.45029°N 0.70431°W	—	Late 17th century (probable)	The farm buildings consist of a range of byres in sandstone with a corrugated asbestos roof, coped gables and shaped kneelers. There is one storey and a loft, and six bays. On the hall front are three doorways with quoined and chamfered surrounds, and slit vents, and on the yard front is also a cart opening.	II
The Witching Post; 54.44781°N 0.75447°W		Late 17th or early 18th century (probable)	The public house, which was later extended, is in sandstone, with corbelled eaves, and pantile roofs with coped gables, and on the left is a shaped initialled and dated kneeler. The original part has two storeys and three bays, and to the right is a later taller single-bay extension. The porch is gabled and contains a doorway with a chamfered and quoined surround. To the right are two large mullioned windows, to the left are altered windows in the ground floor and sashes above. Inside, there is an inglenook fireplace.	II
The Forge and Market Place Cottage; 54.44767°N 0.75462°W	—	1703	Two houses in sandstone with pantile roofs, coped gables and shaped kneelers, and two storeys. The Forge on the left has five bays, a doorway with a quoined and chamfered surround, a dated lintel, and a hood mould. Some windows are mullioned, and others are sashes. Market Place Cottage has two bays, and contains a doorway, and a fixed window with a quoined and chamfered surround.	II
Low Key Green Cottage; 54.43166°N 0.76397°W	—	Early 18th century	A house and outbuilding with a cruck-framed core, partly encased and partly rebuilt in sandstone, with corbelled eaves, and pantile roofs with coped gables. The house has 1½ storeys and two bays, and the outbuilding has one storey and 2½ bays. The openings include doorways, a fire window and a casement window. Inside there are two pairs of upper crucks.	II
Orchard Cottage; 54.43467°N 0.76332°W	—	Early 18th century (probable)	The cottage is in stone with a pantile roof, one storey and four bays. On the front are two doorways, a fixed light, and sash windows, one of them horizontally-sliding.	II
Swarth Howe Cross; 54.46656°N 0.70398°W		Early to mid 18th century	A boundary stone in gritstone, consisting of a column with a square section, about 1.25 metres (4 ft 1 in) high, in a square socket stone. There are inscriptions on three faces.	II
1 High Street; 54.44682°N 0.75546°W		18th century	The house is in sandstone, and has a pantile roof with a coped left gable. There are two storeys and two bays. The doorway is in the centre and is flanked by sash windows, and in the upper floor are pivoting windows.	II
Outbuilding, 4 High Street; 54.44714°N 0.75542°W	—	18th century (probable)	The outbuilding is in sandstone with corbelled eaves and a pantile roof. There is one storey and one bay. It contains a doorway and a fixed-light window.	II
Outbuilding north of Arncliffe View; 54.44758°N 0.75546°W	—	18th century	Stables, later altered and used for other purposes, in sandstone, with a pantile roof and coped gables. There is one storey and four bays. The openings include doorways and pivoted windows.	II
Church View, Hill View and Woodbine Cottage; 54.44428°N 0.75415°W	—	18th century	A row of three houses in sandstone, with pantile roofs, coped gables and kneelers. They all have two storeys, the middle house is taller with three bays, and the outer houses each has two bays. The middle house has corbelled eaves, and a central doorway with a quoined architrave and a hood mould. The windows are mullioned with casements. The windows in the outer houses are sashes, those in the left house in architraves.	II
Stone House; 54.44530°N 0.75487°W	—	Mid 18th century	A farmhouse in sandstone with a pantile roof, coped gables and a block kneeler. The main block has two storeys and two bays, and to the right is a wing and a projecting outshut with 1½ storeys and a catslide roof. The windows on the front are sashes, and in the right return is a horizontally-sliding sash.	II
Walled garden and sheds, Egton Manor; 54.43632°N 0.75996°W	—	18th century (probable)	The garden is enclosed by a wall in sandstone, with orange-red brick banding and flat coping. It varies in height, and contains a gateway with chamfered piers, a round arch on moulded imposts, a keystone, and a moulded cornice under an entablature with heraldic beasts. In the east wall is a segmental-headed niche containing a seat, and a round-arched gateway with a keystone. The sheds are in sandstone with corbelled eaves, and pantile roofs with coped gables. There is one storey and five bays, and they contain paired doorways under a chamfered lintel, and sash windows. In the left return is a louvred owlhole with a chamfered surround.	II
Waymarker at NZ7496100635; 54.39644°N 0.84643°W		18th century (probable)	The waymarker is in gritstone and consists of a massive slab about 1.4 metres (4 ft 7 in) high. The west face is inscribed " OSBM".	II
Waymarker at NZ7965201217; 54.40020°N 0.77472°W		18th century (probable)	The waymarker is in gritstone and consists of a roughly rectangular monolith about 1.25 metres (4 ft 1 in) high. It is pierced with a square hole towards the top.	II
Waymarker at NZ7972602556; 54.41210°N 0.77373°W		18th century (probable)	The waymarker is in gritstone and consists of a roughly rectangular slab about 1.25 metres (4 ft 1 in) high.	II
Waymarker at NZ8025603306; 54.41882°N 0.76481°W		18th century (probable)	The waymarker is in gritstone and consists of a roughly rectangular monolith about 2.1 metres (6 ft 11 in) high. It has a wedge-shaped top pierced by a square hole, and "OSBM" is incised on the north side.	II
Waymarker at NZ7958201570; 54.40362°N 0.77593°W		18th century (probable)	The waymarker is in gritstone and consists of a massive slab about 2 metres (6 ft 7 in) high. The east face is inscribed " OSBM".	II
Waymarker at NZ8027603285; 54.41873°N 0.76444°W		18th century (probable)	The waymarker is in gritstone and consists of a roughly pointed monolith about 1.9 metres (6 ft 3 in) high, with the top pierced by square hole. The south face is inscribed " OSBM".	II
Waymarker at NZ7993100126; 54.38927°N 0.76998°W		18th century (probable)	The waymarker is in gritstone and consists of a massive monolith slab, irregularly tapered, and about 3.5 metres (11 ft) high. The west face is inscribed " OSBM".	II
3 High Street; 54.44695°N 0.75545°W		Late 18th century	A sandstone house with a pantile roof, two storeys and one bay. The doorway is on the left, to its right is a sash window, and in the upper floor is a casement window. All the openings have tooled lintels.	II
Farm buildings south of Red House Farmhouse; 54.44463°N 0.75352°W	—	Late 18th century	The farm buildings are in sandstone with pantile roofs, coped gables and block kneelers. One range consists of a threshing barn and a cartshed with two storeys and three bays, and the other range at right angles, containing byres, cowsheds and stables, has one storey and six bays. The openings include stable doors, windows and slit vents.	II
Farm buildings southwest of Red House Farmhouse; 54.44473°N 0.75382°W	—	Late 18th century	The farm buildings consist of a smithy, a stable and byres. They are in sandstone with a pantile roof, coped gables and block kneelers. The buildings are in a single storey, and consist of a four-bay range to the right of a lower six-bay range. The openings include stable doors, and windows.	II
Primary school and part of presbytery 54.43687°N 0.76193°W		c. 1790	The building, which has been extended, is in sandstone, and has a stone slate roof with stone coping and kneelers. There are two storeys and the entrance is gabled with one bay and a lean-to extension. The doorway is in the extension, and above is a mullioned and transomed window, a canopied niche containing a painted statue, an inscribed semicircular tablet, and a square bellcote with a shallow ogee cap and a cross.	II
Wheatsheaf Inn; 54.44733°N 0.75478°W		Late 18th to early 19th century	The public house, which has been extended, is in sandstone, with corbelled eaves, and roofs of pantile and slate with coped gables, block kneelers and an urn finial. The central part has two storeys and two bays, to the right is a taller part with two storeys and three bays, and to the left is a single-storey wing. The right part contains a doorway with a fanlight, over which is a carved datestone. There is another doorway in the central part, and the windows in all parts are sashes.	II
5, 6 and 7 High Street and Arncliffe View; 54.44730°N 0.75539°W		Early 19th century	A row of four houses and an attached garage, in sandstone that have roofs of slate and pantile with coped gables, and two storeys. The windows are sash windows with painted stone sills, and all the openings have tooled lintels.	II
Beckside Farmhouse and outbuilding 54.43407°N 0.74673°W	—	Early 19th century	The farmhouse and outbuilding are in whitewashed sandstone with quoins. The farmhouse has a slate roof with coped gables and shaped kneelers, two storeys and three bays. The doorway has a fanlight, and the windows are sashes, and all the openings have painted wedge lintels. The outbuilding has one storey and one bay, a pantile roof with a coped right gable, and contains a horizontally-sliding sash window.	II
Church Dale Farmhouse; 54.44653°N 0.78655°W	—	Early 19th century	The farmhouse is in sandstone on a plinth, with corbelled eaves, and a slate roof with coped gables and block kneelers. There are two storeys and three bays, and a two-storey single-bay wing to the right. The doorway has a fanlight and the windows are sashes and all the openings have tooled lintels.	II
Farm buildings, Church Dale Farm; 54.44668°N 0.78635°W	—	Early 19th century	The farm buildings consist of a barn, stables and byres, and are in sandstone with pantile roofs, coped gables and block kneelers. There is a range with one storey and a loft and four bays, flanked at right angles by ranges with one storey and three bays. The openings include stable doors, windows and a pitching door.	II
Dalton's Cottage; 54.43416°N 0.76328°W		Early 19th century	A house in sandstone, with a raised eaves course, and a slate roof with coped gables and block kneelers. There are two storeys, two bays, and an extension to the left. The doorway has an architrave, the windows are sashes, and all the openings have tooled lintels.	II
The Horse Shoe Hotel; 54.43568°N 0.76638°W		Early 19th century	The public house is in sandstone, and has a pantile roof with coped gables, shaped kneelers and ball and pedestal finials. There are two storeys and attics, a main front of four bays, a lean-to on the left, and a rear wing with two storeys and two bays. The central doorway has a shaped tooled lintel, to its left is a fire window, to the right is a canted bay window, the other windows are tripartite, and in the roof are two flat dormers with casements. In the right gable end is a relief "F" in a circular surround with keystones.	II
Walls and gate piers, Egton Manor; 54.43621°N 0.76057°W	—	19th century	The walls enclosing the grounds, and the gate piers, are in sandstone. The west wall has chamfered coping, and the north and east walls have sloped coping. The walls contain gateways flanked by piers with overhanging pyramidal caps and some with urn finials.	II
St Hedda's Church, Egton Bridge; 54.43679°N 0.76152°W		1866–67	The church, designed by Hadfield and Son, is in stone with Welsh slate roofs and terracotta ridge tiles. It consists of a nave, north and south aisles, a chancel and an apse. At the west end is a pointed arch rising to a gabled bellcote with a cross finial, and a doorway with a pointed moulded arch with a hood mould and columns, above which is a circular window. Most of the other windows are lancets.	II
Milepost; 54.47937°N 0.78634°W	—	Late 19th century	The milepost on the northeast side of the A171 road is in cast-iron, and has a triangular plan and a sloping triangular top. On the top is inscribed "NY RCC", and on the faces are pointing hands, with the distance to Whitby on the left face, and on the right face the distance to Guisborough.	II
St Hilda's Church, Egton; 54.44132°N 0.75338°W		1878–79	The church, designed by E. H. Smales, is in sandstone with a stone slate roof, and incorporates earlier material. It consists of a nave, north and south aisles, a chancel with a vestry and organ chamber, and a southwest tower. The tower has three stages, angle buttresses, and an octagonal stair turret to the southeast with a hipped roof. It contains a south doorway with a trefoil head, above which are blind round arches, clock faces, paired louvred bell openings, a Lombard frieze, and a saddleback roof with pierced roundels in the gables.	II
Walls, piers and gates, St Hilda's Church, Egton; 54.44119°N 0.75354°W		1879	The churchyard walls are in sandstone with sloped coping, and contain triangular piers with chamfered flat caps. The main entrance is flanked by cylindrical piers with criss-cross incisions and conical caps. In the north wall are two pinnacles in the form of tourelles with conical caps. The pedestrian gate is in wrought iron with pomegranate finials.	II
4 High Street; 54.44704°N 0.75542°W		1880	The house, which incorporates 17th-century material, is in sandstone, and has a stone slate roof. There are two storeys and three bays. On the front are two doorways, the right one with a chamfered and quoined surround and a dated lintel. The windows are sashes, those to the right of the doorways are paired under a relieving arch. In the upper floor is a recessed date panel.	II
Former farm buildings east of Wardles Farm House; 54.44548°N 0.75519°W	—	c. 1880	A range of cartsheds, byres and stables, later converted for residential use, in rusticated sandstone, with a stepped eaves corbel table, and a slate roof with coped gables, moulded kneelers, and ball and pedestal finials. There is one storey and attics, and eight bays. The openings include square-headed cart arches, stable doors and windows, including two gabled dormers. On the gables are carved trefoils and pointed ball finials.	II
Egton Manor; 54.43565°N 0.76050°W		1893	A country house that was extended in 1913, and later reduced, in sandstone with slate roofs, and an irregular plan. The entrance front has a block of two storeys and attics and four bays, and flanking two-storey one-bay projecting wings. There is a moulded sill band, a cornice, a moulded eaves cornice, and a coped parapet on the wings, balustraded across the front. On the front is a porch with attached Tuscan columns, and the windows are sash windows. On the garden front are three gabled bays and a three-bay extension. It contains a pedimented Ionic porch.	II
Outbuildings 5 metres north of Egton Manor; 54.43595°N 0.76049°W	—	1893	The outbuildings are in sandstone with slate roofs, coped gables, and ball and pedestal finials. The oldest part is a stable range and there are later extensions. The stable range has one storey and attics, and five bays, projecting from it is a single-storey five-bay range of outbuildings, and there is an extension with one storey and 5½ bays.	II
Outbuildings 50 metres north of Egton Manor; 54.43609°N 0.76071°W	—	1911	The outbuildings are in sandstone on a chamfered plinth, with slate roofs, coped gables, and ball and pedestal finials, and they consist of a house, garages and stables. The house has two storeys and three bays, and is flanked by a single-storey two-bay range on the right and a single-storey single-bay range on the left, and at right angles is a single-storey five-bay stable range. The main range has a gabled central bay, string courses, a round-headed doorway with a hood mould, sash windows, and two inscribed panels over the doorway.	II
Memorial cross 54.41910°N 0.75553°W		1929	The cross on Castle Hill, also known as the Swinsty Cross, commemorates Francis Titcomb, who died following a plane crash on the hill in 1917. It is in local stone and consists of a blind wheel-head cross with a carving of the Crucifixion. This is on a tapering column with stepped capital, standing on a cube with panels on the sides, one with initials and a date, on a base on a square platform.	II
