= St Hilda's Church, Egton =

Coordinates: 54°26′29″N 0°45′12″W

St Hilda's, Egton
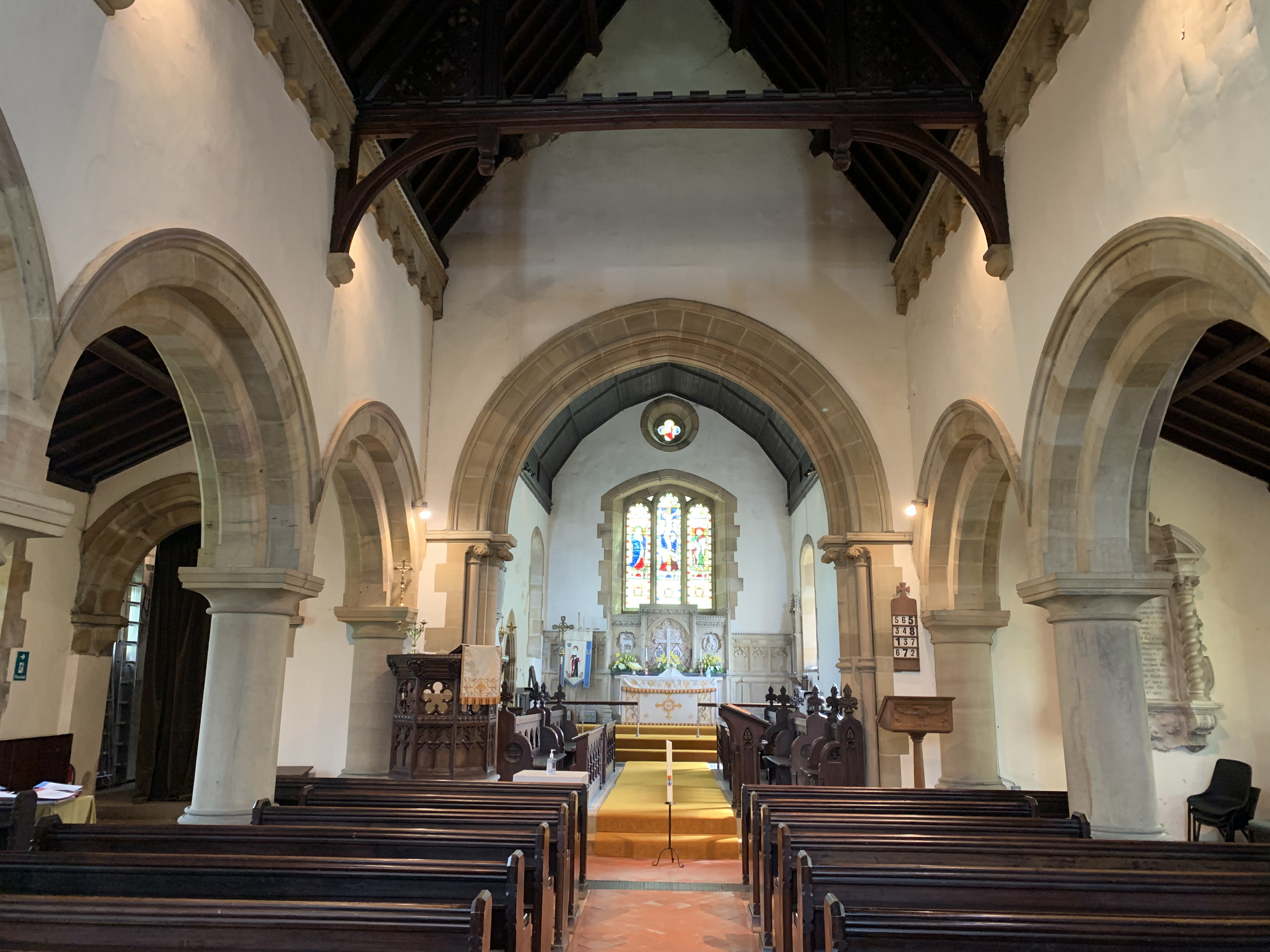
- St Hilda's, Egton
- OS grid reference: NZ 80951 05811
- Location: Egton, North Yorkshire YO21 1UT
- Country: England
- Denomination: Church of England
- Website: Official website

History
- Founder: John Foster
- Dedication: St Hilda

Architecture
- Heritage designation: Grade II
- Style: Gothic Revival
- Years built: 1879

St Hilda's church, Egton, is a Church of England church in Egton, North Yorkshire, built in 1879 and designed by local architect E. H. Smales. St Hilda’s is one of five churches in the United Benefice of Middle Esk Moor.

== History ==
=== Norman era ===
The original Norman church of St Hilda's was located in Glaisdale Lane, around 0.6 miles (1 km) to the west of Egton village. The Norman church stood until its demolition in 1878.

=== 19th century ===
In the 1870s the decision was taken to build a new church and school closer to the centre of Egton village. Construction of the new church of St Hilda's was enabled by the Foster family, philanthropic local landowners. The church was completed between 1878 and 1879; it was consecrated in December 1879. The architect was Edward H. Smales. The church is constructed from tooled sandstone with sandstone ashlar dressings, and has a stone slate roof. The church contains a number of memorials to members of the Foster family.

Following demolition, little of the old Norman church was left, apart from the graveyard and a Mortuary Chapel built in 1897. Some evidence of the old church remains; the bases of three Norman pillars are still visible.

=== 20th Century ===
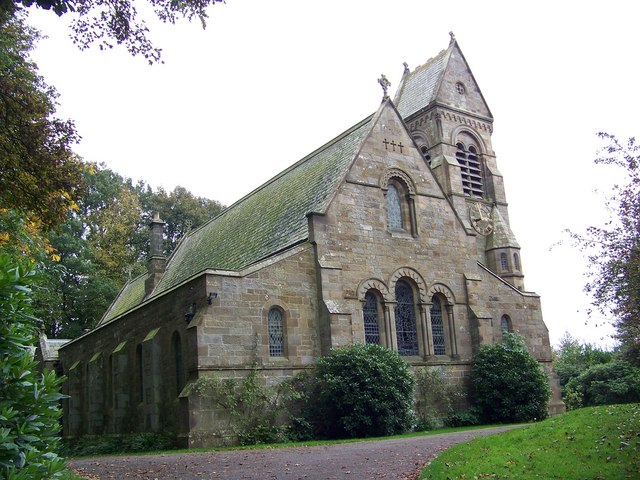
St Hilda's Church, Egton

In 1969 St Hilda's became a Grade II listed building.

== See also ==
- Listed buildings in Egton
- John Foster

== Gallery ==
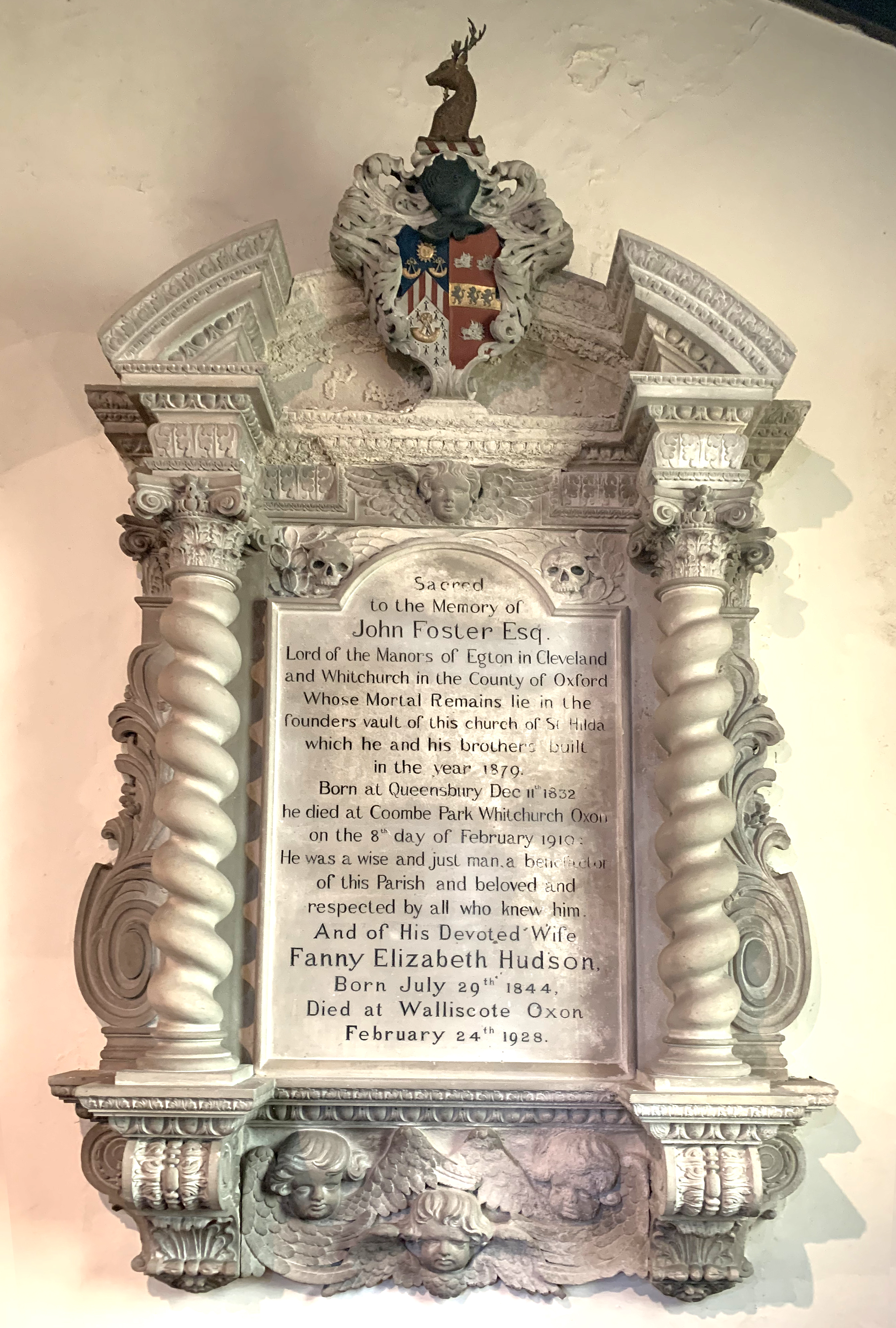
Memorial to John Foster

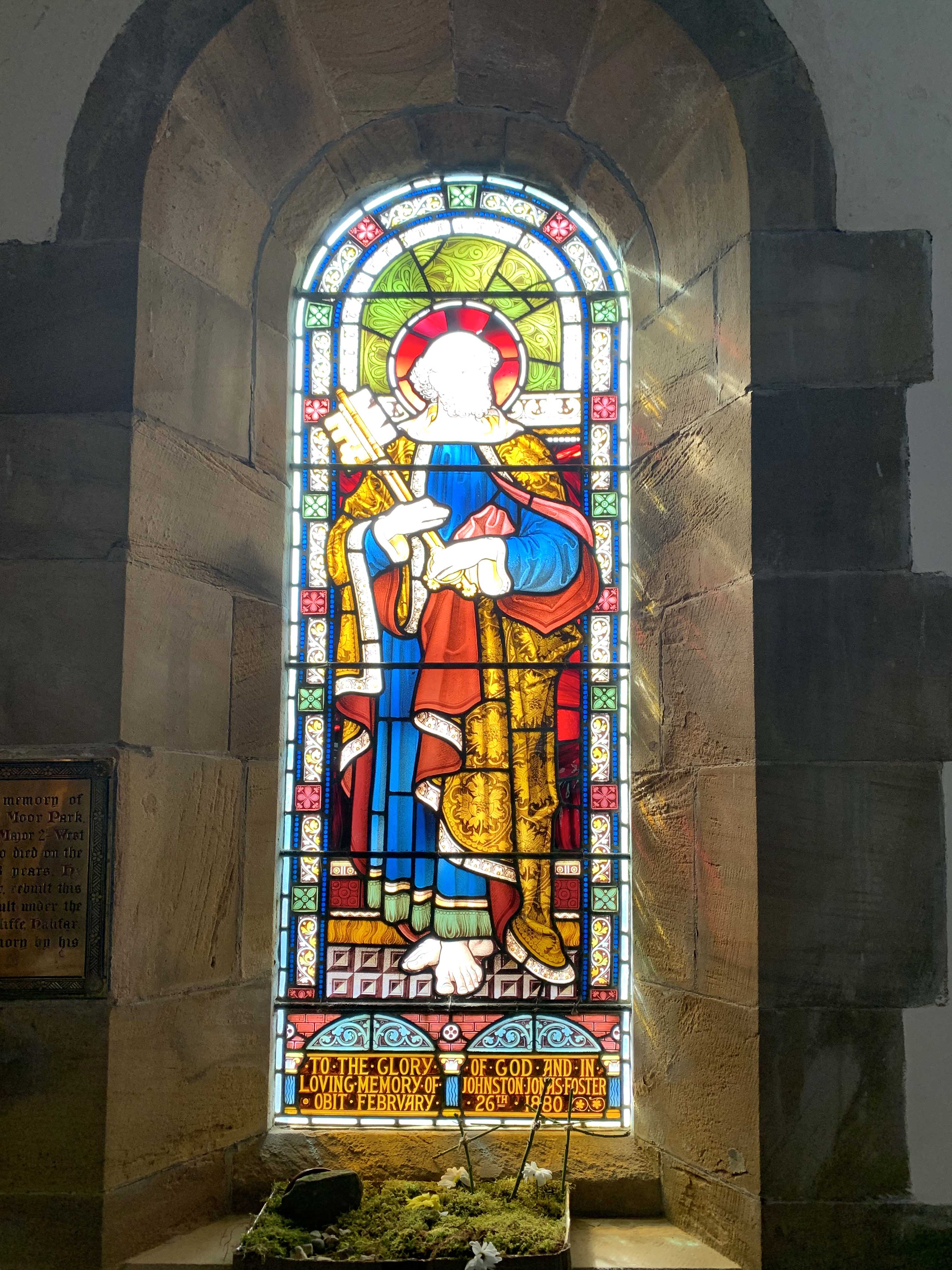
Stained glass window at St Hilda's, Egton

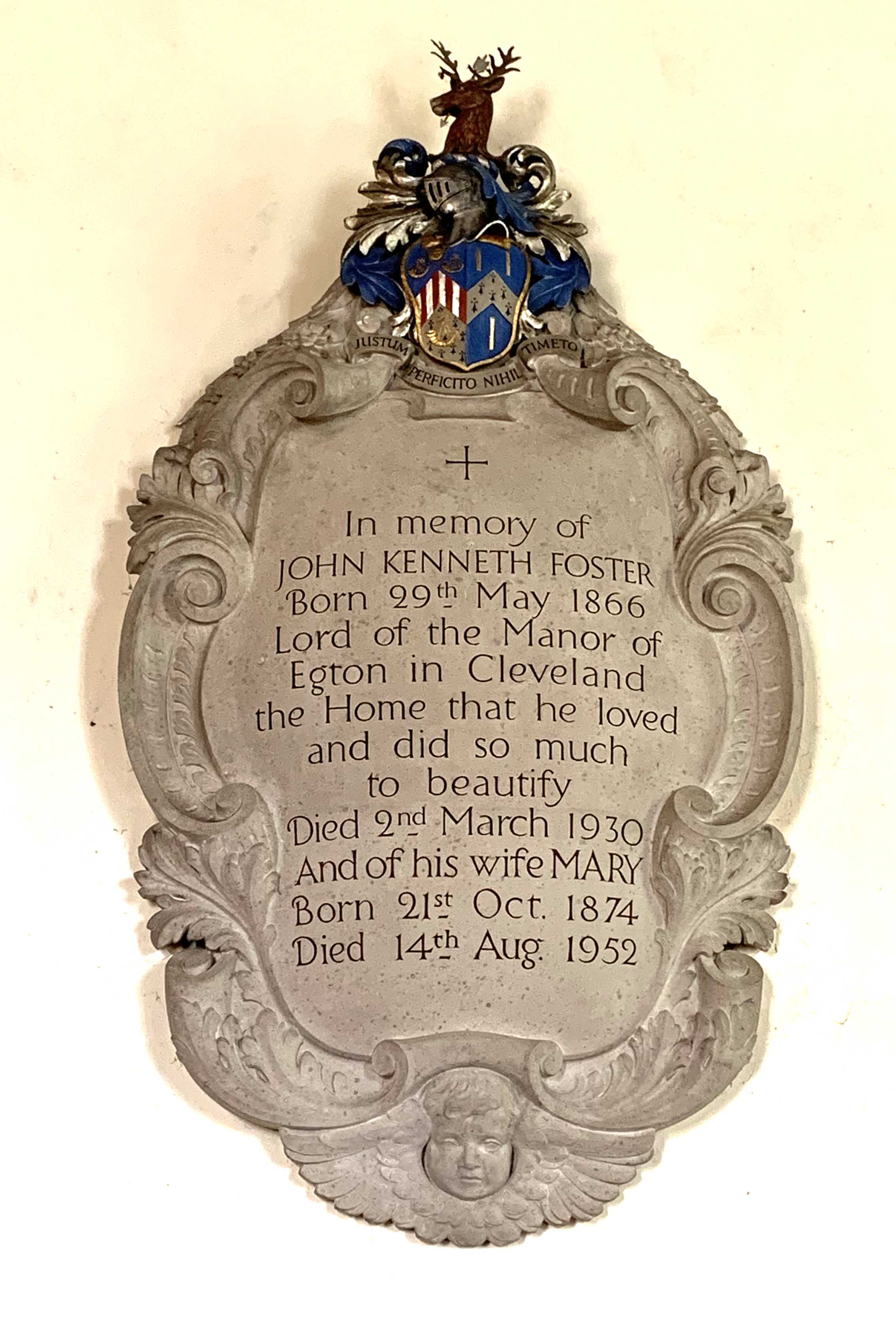
Memorial to J K Foster
