= St Hedda's Catholic Primary School =

School in Egton Bridge, England

Coordinates: 54°26′13″N 0°45′43″W

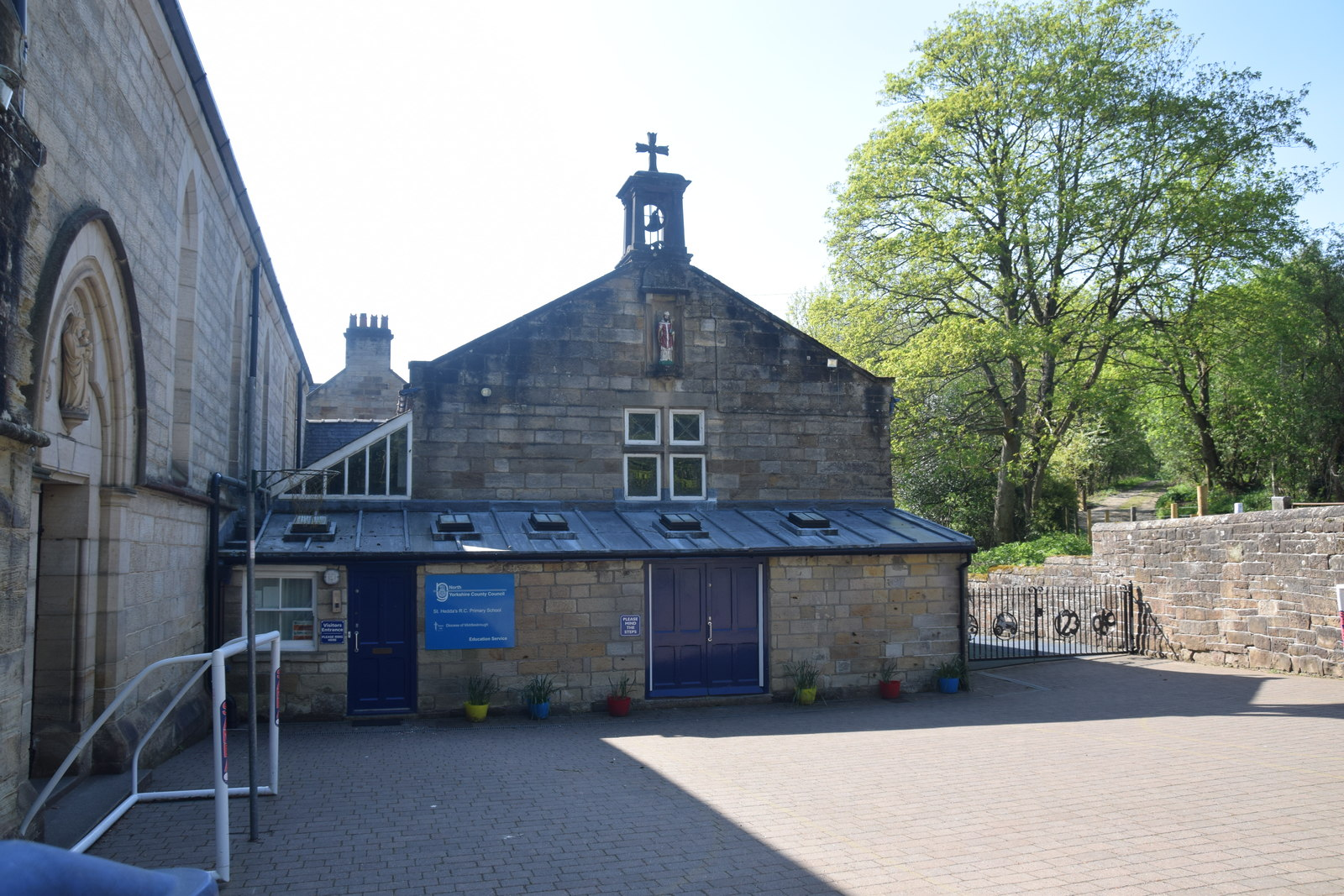
The building, in 2018

St Hedda's Catholic Primary School is a school in Egton Bridge, a village in North Yorkshire, in England. It is part of the Nicholas Postgate Catholic Academy Trust.

A Catholic chapel was in existence in Egton Bridge by 1743, by Bridge House, which was owned by the Smith family. By 1780, 415 Catholics were recorded in the district. In 1790, a church was built in the village, with a presbytery to the rear. In 1867, the new St Hedda's Church, Egton Bridge was consecrated, the old church was converted into a school, and the presbytery was extended. The school was extended in the 20th century, to the front, back and left. The building was grade II listed in 1969.

The building is constructed of sandstone, and has a stone slate roof with stone coping and kneelers. It has two storeys and the entrance is gabled with one bay and a lean-to extension. The doorway is in the extension, and above is a mullioned and transomed window, a canopied niche containing a painted statue, an inscribed semicircular tablet, and a square bellcote with a shallow ogee cap and a cross.

== See also ==
- Listed buildings in Egton
