= Jarapa =

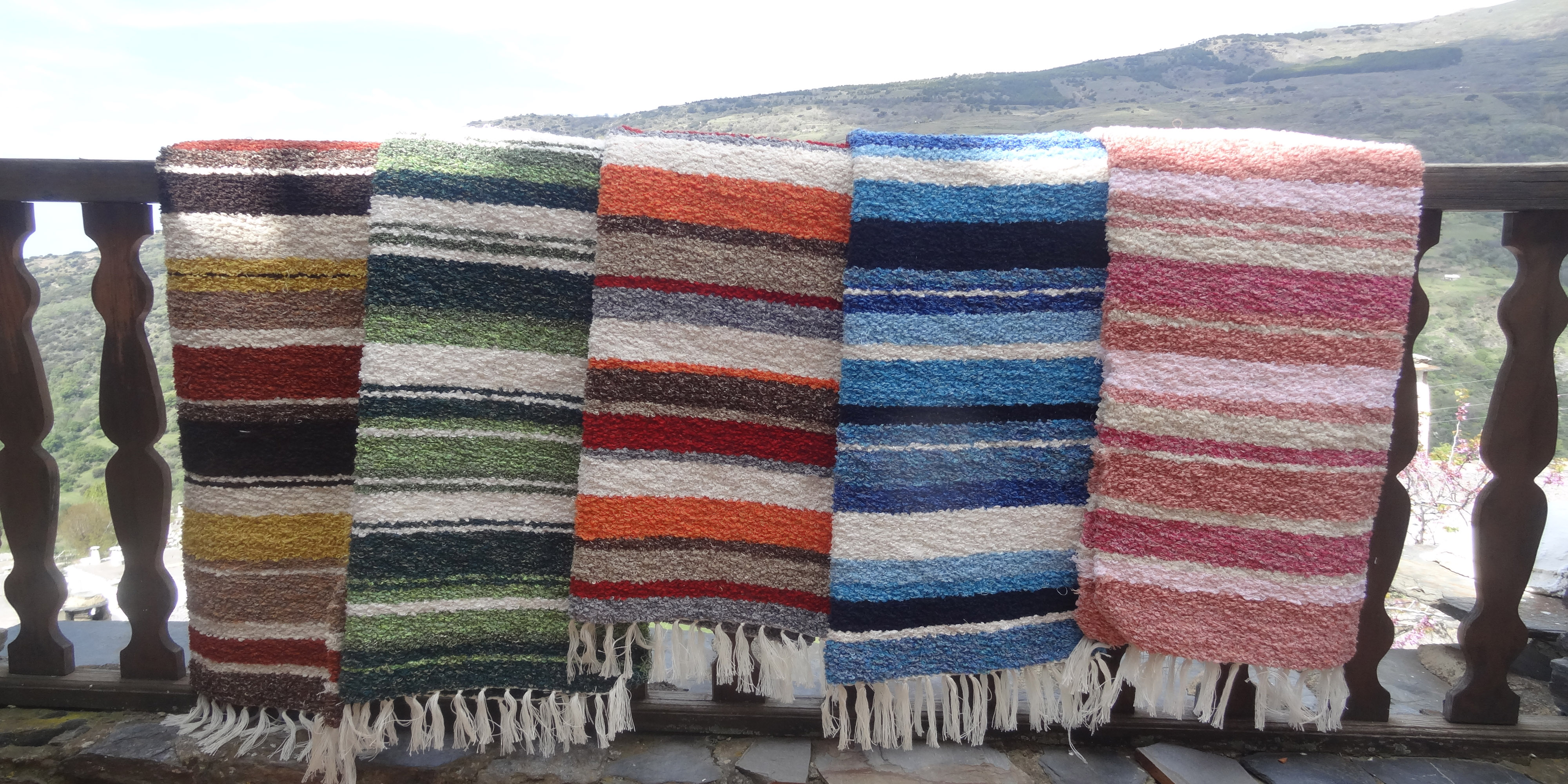
Jarapas weavings

Jarapa is a thick fabric of various compositions, used to make traditional rugs, blankets, bedspreads, curtains etc. in Almería and Murcia in the Spanish South East.

Manufacture and use are concentrated in the area of the Alpujarras. The material used in their manufacture is often recycled scraps from the textile industry of Catalonia further North.

== Production ==
With the evolution of the textile industry, materials aside from cotton such as polyester and other fibers are used, obtained from Cataloina and Alcoy.

In the process of production, textile factory scraps are used to make "strips", which are wound into balls to make "churros" (a type of skein that is placed on a loom's shuttle so that the strips can be woven). Once the churros are on the shuttles, they move across the loom, between the threads, creating the fabric. After weaving is complete, the rugs are removed from the loom and readied for sale by sewing along the edges or finishing with knots.

Although new designs and techniques have been gradually introduced in the manufacture of jarapas, the traditional wide-striped style remains one of the most popular with tourists.

== History ==
Once used as mattress protectors to prevent chafing from the springs of old bed frames, the jarapa has become an ornamental piece with a certain ethnological value. Almost extinct by 1960, the Ministry of Labor organized apprenticeship courses in 1963, which produced new artisans. Modern jarapas weigh less and provide more warmth, but discerning buyers still seek out the traditional ones, made with a cotton warp and woven from strips of colored fabric scraps.

== See also ==
- Rag rug
