= Egton railway station =

Railway station in North Yorkshire, England

Egton
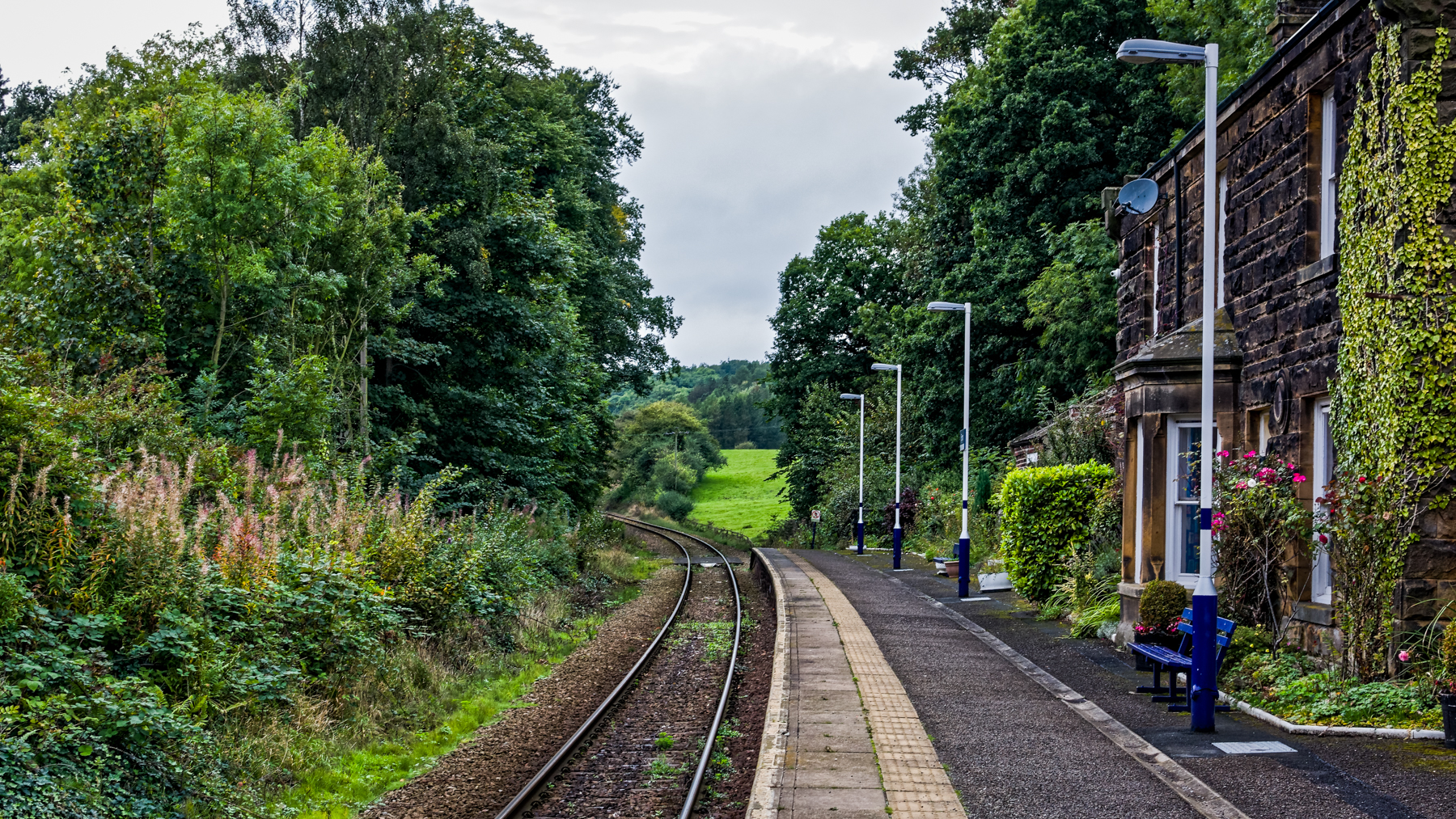

General information
- Location: Egton Bridge, North Yorkshire; England
- Coordinates: 54°26′15″N 0°45′42″W
- Grid reference: NZ804053
- Owner: Network Rail
- Manager: Northern Trains
- Platforms: 1
- Tracks: 1

Other information
- Station code: EGT
- Classification: DfT category F2

History
- Original company: North Eastern Railway
- Pre-grouping: North Eastern Railway
- Post-grouping: London and North Eastern Railway; British Rail (North Eastern Region)

Key dates
- 2 October 1865: Opened

Passengers
- 2021/22: ▲10,240
- 2022/23: ▼8,642
- 2023/24: ▲10,554
- 2024/25: ▼10,100
- 2025/26: ▲13,604
Location
- Location within North Yorkshire
Notes
- Passenger statistics from the Office of Rail and Road

Egton is a railway station on the Esk Valley Line, which runs between Middlesbrough and Whitby via Nunthorpe. The station, situated 7 miles 66 chains (12.6 km) west of Whitby, serves the villages of Egton and Egton Bridge in North Yorkshire, England. It is owned by Network Rail and managed by Northern Trains.

== History ==
The station was opened by the North Eastern Railway on 2 October 1865, following the completion of the section of line between Castleton Moor and Grosmont, as proposed by Castleton and Grosmont Railway in an Act passed by Parliament in July 1861.

The station opened at the same time as the line, and because of its elevated location above the valley floor, the architect of the station buildings, Thomas Prosser, had the foundations buried 16 feet (4.9 m) deep.

Between 1865 and 1881, the station was known as Egton after the bigger of the two villages it served, but between 1881 and 1892, it was called Egton Bridge named after its physical location. It reverted to being plain Egton in 1892.

The station stopped forwarding and receiving goods in August 1965.

== Services ==
As of the December 2025 timetable change, the station is served by six trains per day on Mondays to Saturdays and four on Sundays towards Whitby. Heading towards Middlesbrough via Nunthorpe, there are six trains per day on Mondays to Saturdays, with one continuing to Newcastle via Hartlepool, and four on Sundays, with two continuing to Darlington. All services are operated by Northern Trains.

Rolling stock used: Class 156 Super Sprinter and Class 158 Express Sprinter

Preceding station	National Rail	Following station
Glaisdale	Northern Trains; Esk Valley Line	Grosmont
