= Egton =

Village and civil parish in North Yorkshire, England

Coordinates: 54.446°N 0.755°W

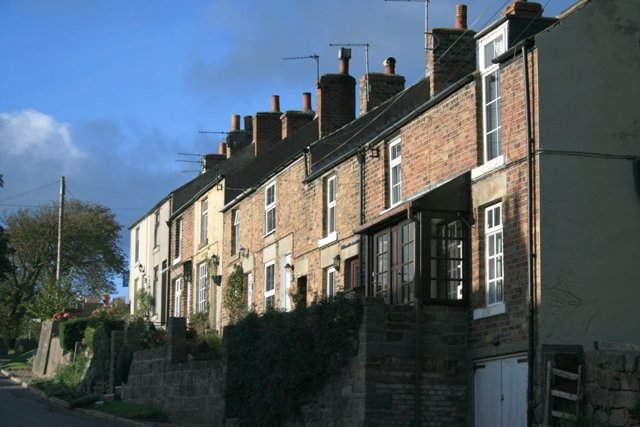
- The High Street

- Location within North Yorkshire
- Population: 448 (2011 census)
- OS grid reference: NZ808063
- Civil parish: Egton
- Unitary authority: North Yorkshire
- Ceremonial county: North Yorkshire
- Region: Yorkshire and the Humber
- Country: England
- Sovereign state: United Kingdom
- Post town: WHITBY
- Postcode district: YO21
- Police: North Yorkshire
- Fire: North Yorkshire
- Ambulance: Yorkshire
- UK Parliament: Scarborough and Whitby

Egton is a village and civil parish in the county of North Yorkshire, England, about 5 miles (8 km) west of Whitby, and located within the North York Moors National Park. There is a nearby village called Egton Bridge, which is home to Egton railway station.

The village was included in the Survey of English Dialects, published in various forms between 1962 and 1996. Unlike the other sites, a full book was written on the local dialect by Hans Tidholm. According to the 2011 UK census, Egton parish had a population of 448, a reduction on the 2001 UK census figure of 459.

From 1974 to 2023 it was part of the Borough of Scarborough. It is now administered by the unitary North Yorkshire Council.

== History ==
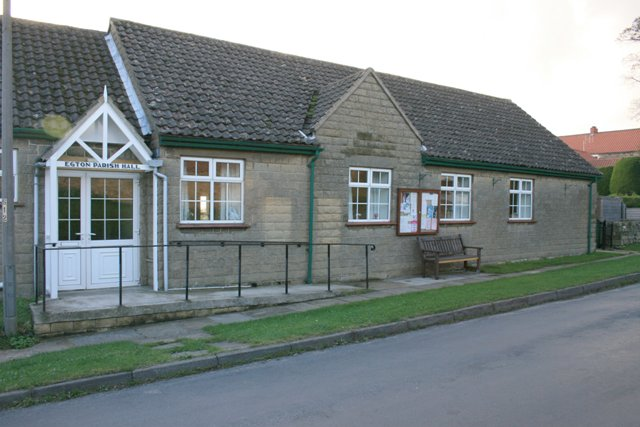
The parish hall

Egton is mentioned in the Domesday Book as having three ploughlands and several leagues of woodland. The name derives from an Old English personal name, Ecga and the word tun, meaning Ecga's farmstead or settlement. The village was historically in the wapentake of Langbaurgh East, and in the petty sessional division of Whitby Strand. In 1974, the village and parish were moved from the old Whitby Rural District in the North Riding of Yorkshire, to the newer county of North Yorkshire.

In 1269, a weekly market to be held each Wednesday was granted by Henry III. The king also granted the lord of the manor a yearly feast on the eve of St Hilda, the church's dedication. It appears that the market and feast-day ceased to be celebrated as a Tuesday only market was granted by William III c. 1700. After the Reformation, Egton retained a number of Catholic families (recusants), this was due to the settlement being located near to the coast, and priests from Europe could be smuggled into one of the many sympathetic families in the area.

Egton is an important local centre for family history. Prior to 1880, many important birth, marriage and death records were administered from Egton parish. The church in Egton holds detailed transcriptions of parish records, but these only date as far back as 1622. The cemetery is half a mile west, at the old church site, the church being demolished in 1878. After 1870 many parishioners were buried at nearby Aislaby.

=== Population ===
Population of Egton 1811–2015
1801	1811	1821	1831	1841	1851	1861	1871	1881	1891	1901	1911	1921	1931	1951	1961	1971	2001	2011	2015
971	1,026	1,037	1,071	1,128	1,129	1,115	1,330	1,226	1,329	1,020	1,026	993	920	796	674	616	459	448	450‡

‡ Estimated.

== Events ==
Egton is home to the Egton Road Race or Gooseberry Run, an annual charity race around the village, which was first held in 2001 to raise funds to save St Hilda’s Chapel from demolition.

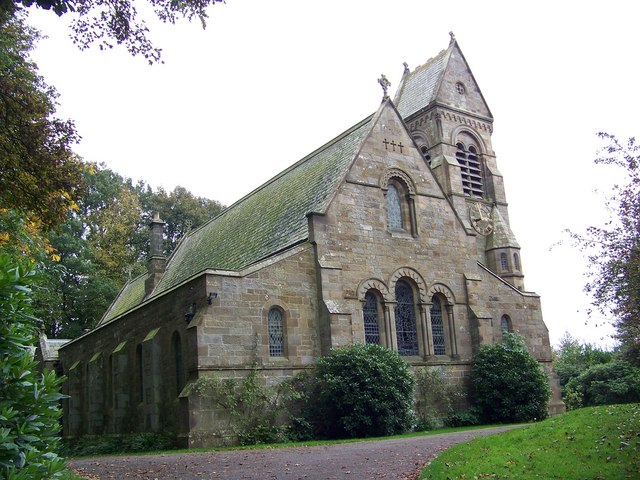
St Hilda's Church, Egton built in 1879, replaced an earlier 14th century structure

Egton's horse and agricultural show is an annual event held in August at the village's showfield. The show is organised by a committee of volunteers.

== Sport ==
Egton Cricket Club is based on the Egton Recreation Ground, on the northern outskirts of the village. The club has a Midweek Senior XI in the Esk Valley Evening League and a junior section that competes in the Derwent Valley Junior Cricket League.

== Notable people ==
- John Oxlee, curate at the Church of St Hilda 1805–1811
- Nicholas Postgate, a Catholic martyr, was born in Egton.
- Christopher Simpson (musician)

== See also ==
- Listed buildings in Egton
