= John Foster (textile manufacturer) =

British manufacturer (1798–1879)

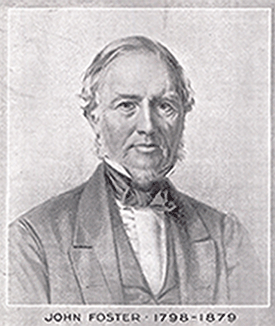
John Foster

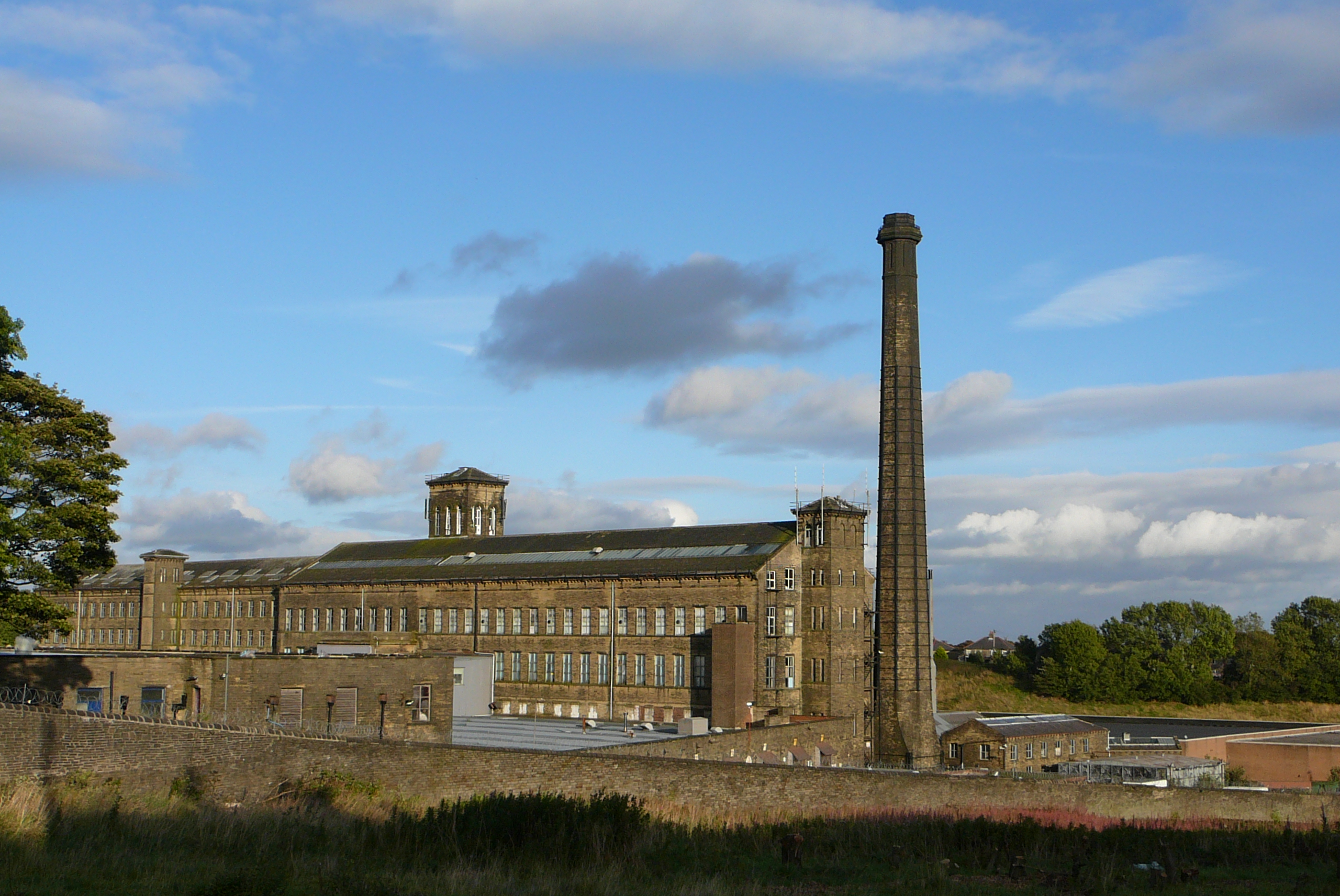
Black Dyke Mills, Queensbury

John Foster (1798–1879) was a British manufacturer of worsted cloth.

He was the son of a colliery owner and farmer in Bradford, West Yorkshire. In 1819 he married Ruth Briggs, daughter of a landowner from Queensbury, on the outskirts of Bradford.

He set up in business the same year in a warehouse in Queensbury on what would later be the site of the Black Dyke Mills. Initially he would buy yarn and distribute it to handloom weavers who would sell back the finished cloth. By 1827 he was successful enough to build Prospect House as a family home.

In 1828 he rented Cannon Mill for wool spinning, prior to erecting the first part of Black Dyke Mills in 1835 on land acquired from his father-in-law. By 1851 Black Dyke Mills was dominating the Queensbury landscape and at the Great Exhibition of that year he was awarded first prize for alpaca and mohair fabrics and the gold medal for yarns.

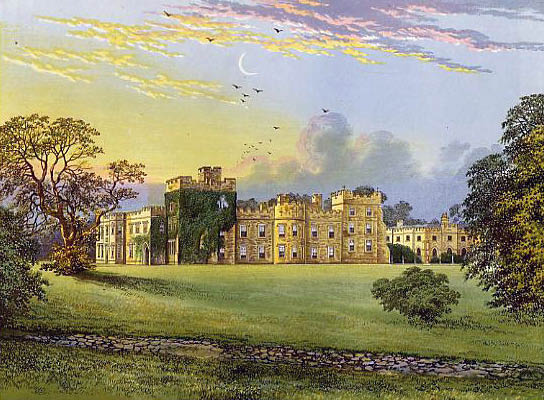
Hornby Castle

In the 1870s he bought and renovated Hornby Castle, Lancashire, to which he retired. On his death in 1879 he was succeeded by his son William, who had been made a full partner in the business of John Foster & Son since 1842. The company is still a leading manufacturer of worsted and mohair fabric.

== See also ==
- Black Dyke Mills Band
- Egton Manor
- William Henry Foster (grandson)
