= Rag rug =

Type of rug

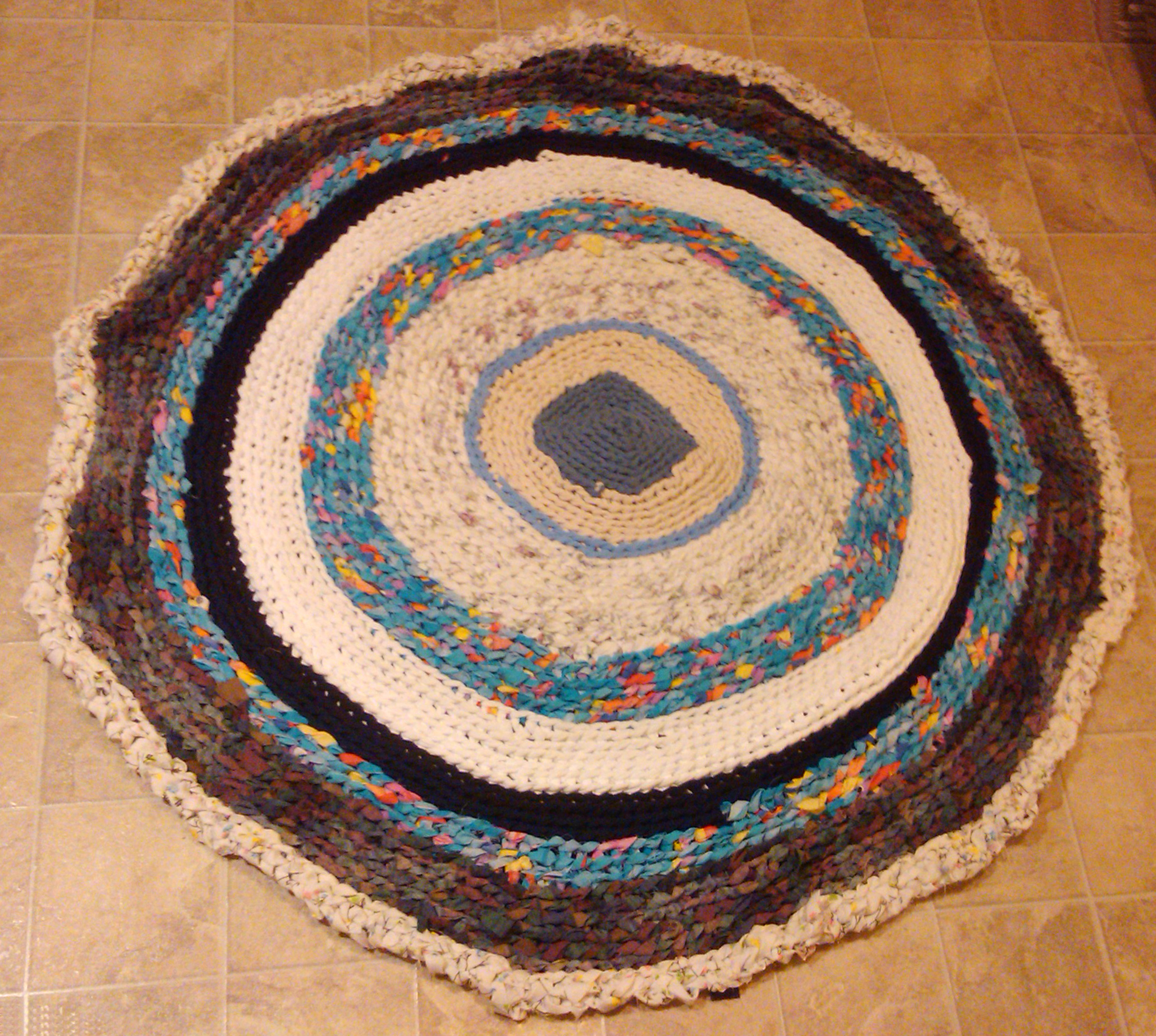
Rag rug constructed from T-shirts and bed linen

A rag rug is a rug or mat made from rags. Small pieces of recycled fabric are either hooked into or poked through a woven-fabric backing of hessian (burlap in North America), or else the strips are braided or plaited together to make a mat. Other names for this kind of rug are derived from the material (clippy or clootie rug) or technique (proggie or proddie rug, poke mats and peg mats).

In the UK, these thrift rugs were popular in the nineteenth century and during World War II in working-class homes seeking to reuse precious material. The hessian back may have come from a food sack.

== Techniques ==
There are three main techniques. In the UK it was common to poke or pull a small clipping of cloth through a hessian (burlap) backing, giving a shaggy appearance. In the US, a thin strip of fabric was hooked through the hessian so that the top surface was a small loop pile. A third technique is to plait, braid, lace or sew the fabric strips together.

== See also ==
- Jarapa
