= Nicholas Postgate =

English priest and Blessed

Blessed Nicholas Postgate
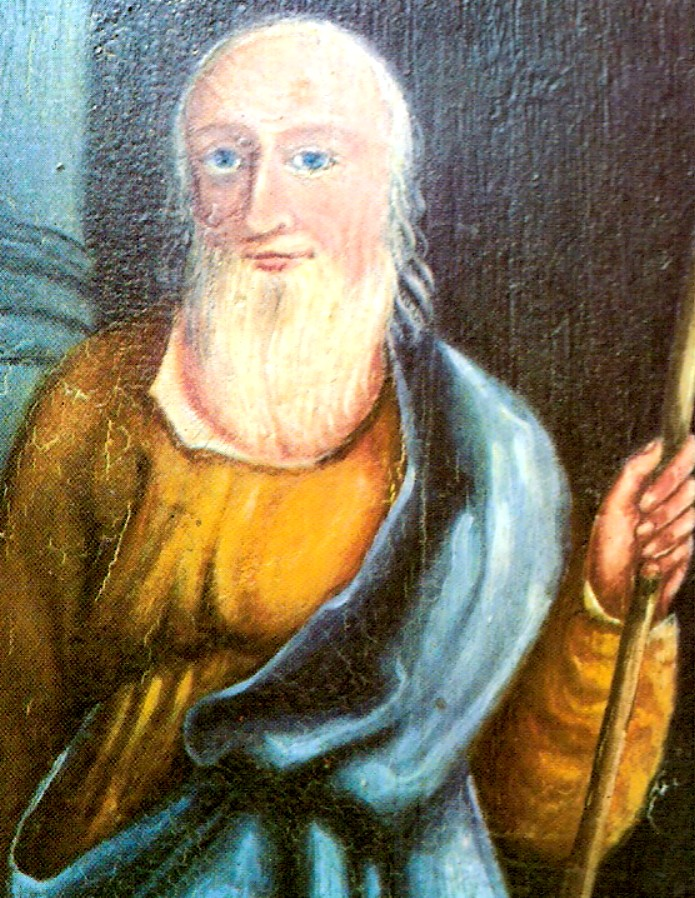

Priest and Martyr
- Born: 1596; Egton, North Yorkshire
- Died: 7 August 1679; York, England
- Cause of death: Hanged, disembowelled and quartered
- Resting place: Egton Bridge, Ampleforth Abbey, Pickering
- Venerated in: Catholic Church
- Beatified: 22 November 1987, St. Peter's Basilica, Rome, Italy by Pope John Paul II
- Feast: 7 August

Nicholas Postgate (1596 or 1597 – 7 August 1679) was an English Catholic priest who was executed for treason during the anti-Catholic persecution in England. He was put to death on 7 August 1679 on the Knavesmire in York, following false accusations and amid heightened tensions of the period. Postgate is recognized as one of the 85 English Catholic Martyrs of England and Wales beatified by Pope John Paul II in November 1987.

== Early life and priesthood ==
Nicholas Postgate was born at Kirkdale House, Egton, Yorkshire, England. He entered Douay College in France on 11 July 1621. He took the college oath on 12 March 1623, received minor orders on 23 December 1624, the subdiaconate on 18 December 1627, the diaconate on 18 March 1628, and was ordained a priest two days later.

Postgate was sent on his mission to England on 29 June 1630, where he worked for the Catholic faith. In the 1660s, he settled in Ugthorpe, near his birthplace. His parish, known by the extinct name of Blackamoor, extended between Guisborough, Pickering, and Scarborough.

Thomas Ward, who later wrote about him, knew Postgate well. He was exceptionally conscientious in performing his pastoral duties. Historian J. P. Kenyon remarked that "for nearly half a century he tramped the high moors of North Yorkshire and the plains of the Holderness, ministering to a scattered flock".

== Background to Arrest ==
Although anti-Catholic sentiment in England had decreased by the late 1670s, it resurged due to the fabricated Popish Plot of 1678. Titus Oates falsely claimed there was a conspiracy to install a Catholic king, inciting renewed and fierce persecution of English Catholics. This period marked the last time Catholics were executed in England for their faith, with Nicholas Postgate being among the final victims.

During the panic incited by Oates, prominent Protestant magistrate Sir Edmund Berry Godfrey was murdered, and Oates blamed the Catholics. In response, Sir Edmund's manservant, John Reeves, sought revenge and decided to act in the Whitby area, possibly because he knew priests arrived there from France.

== Arrest, Trial, and Execution ==
Nicholas Postgate was apprehended by exciseman Reeves while performing a baptism at the house of Matthew Lyth in Little Beck, near Whitby. Reeves, accompanied by his colleague William Cockerill, raided the house during the ceremony and arrested Postgate, who was 82 years old at the time. Lyth had inadvertently alerted the authorities by speaking publicly about the ceremony.

Postgate was condemned under the Jesuits, etc. Act 1584 (27 Elizabeth, c. 2) for being a priest on English soil. He was executed by hanging, disembowelment, and quartering at the Knavesmire in York. His remains were given to his friends and interred, with one of his hands sent to Douay College. On the scaffold, he stated that he was too old and frail to make long speeches and would simply die for the Catholic faith to which he had devoted his life.

Reeves was recorded in a treasury book as having been paid 22 shillings for the apprehension of Postgate, but some believe he did not receive the money before committing suicide by drowning.

== Beatification ==
Blessed Nicholas Postgate was beatified by Pope John Paul II on 22 November 1987. The beatification ceremony took place at St. Peter's Basilica in Rome, Italy, where he was honored along with 84 other martyrs of England and Wales. This group of martyrs, known collectively as the Eighty-five Martyrs of England and Wales, were recognized for their sacrifice and commitment to their faith during a time of Catholic persecution.

== Legacy ==
Postgate's portable altar stone is venerated at the front of the altar at Saint Joseph's Catholic Church in Pickering.

Since 1974, an annual open-air service has been held in his honour, alternating between Egton Bridge and Ugthorpe. Additionally, a pub in Egton Bridge is named "The Postgate" in his memory.

Given the uncommon nature of the name, he is likely related to the Postgate family, which includes many notable members from the 19th century onwards.

The Postgate Society aims to spread knowledge of Nicholas Postgate and promote interest in Catholic history during penal times.

The Nicholas Postgate Catholic Academy Trust, named in his honour, comprises 27 Catholic schools across Teesside, North Yorkshire, and the City of York.

== See also ==
- Douai Martyrs
