= Egton Bridge =

Village in North Yorkshire, England

Coordinates: 54°26′10″N 0°45′42″W

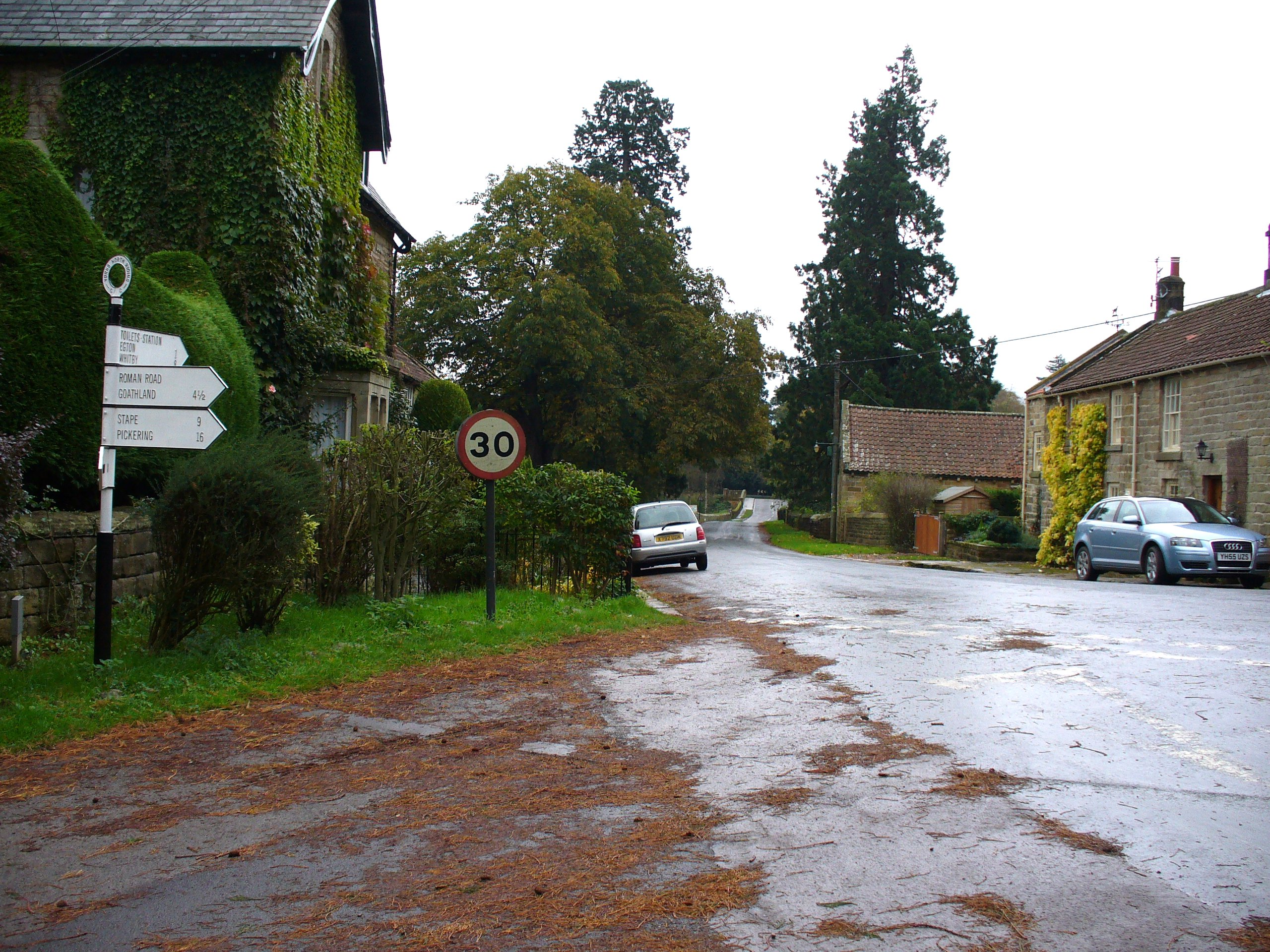
- Village of Egton Bridge

- Location within North Yorkshire
- OS grid reference: NZ804052
- Unitary authority: North Yorkshire
- Ceremonial county: North Yorkshire
- Region: Yorkshire and the Humber
- Country: England
- Sovereign state: United Kingdom
- Post town: WHITBY
- Postcode district: YO21
- Police: North Yorkshire
- Fire: North Yorkshire
- Ambulance: Yorkshire

Egton Bridge is a village in the county of North Yorkshire, England. It lies within the North York Moors National Park, on the River Esk, between the villages of Glaisdale and Grosmont, about six miles south-west of Whitby, and on the route of the Esk Valley Walk.

From 1974 to 2023 it was part of the Borough of Scarborough. It is now administered by the unitary North Yorkshire Council.

The stone bridge that crosses the Esk was rebuilt in 1992, having been destroyed by flood in the 1930s.

== Amenities ==
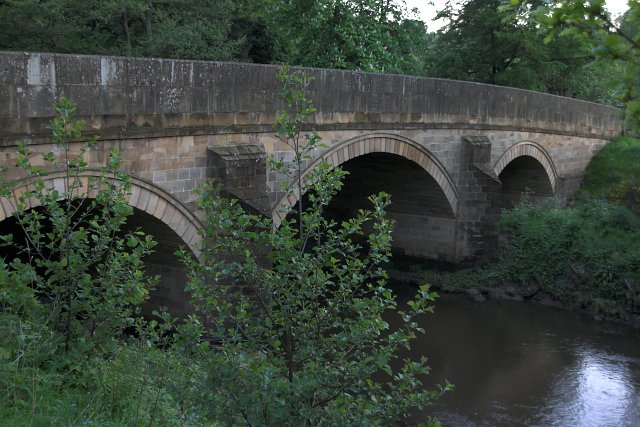
The bridge over the Esk

The village is served by Egton railway station, on the Esk Valley Line, which also serves the nearby village of Egton.

There are two hotels in the village: the Horseshoe Hotel and the Postgate Inn. Bordering the village is Egton Estate, a shooting estate at the heart of which is Egton Manor, a Grade II Listed building built in 1869 by the Foster family, whose descendants still own and operate the property.

=== Shows and fairs ===
==== Egton Bridge Gooseberry Show ====
Egton Bridge is the setting for the oldest surviving gooseberry show in the country, established in 1800. The show is held on the first Tuesday in August each year by the Egton Bridge Old Gooseberry Society. In January 2025 the show was featured in BBC's Monty Don's British Gardens.

==== Egton Show ====
Egton Horse and Agricultural Society runs an agricultural show each summer. It often features attractions such as a wrought iron and farrier display, a farmers market, show competitions for horse, cattle, sheep, goat, ferret, fur and feather classes, together with bee keeping, produce and handicraft and children's sections. It is one of the largest village shows in the country run by a band of voluntary helpers.

==== Postgate Rally ====
The annual Postgate Rally, in honour of Blessed Nicholas Postgate and the English and Welsh Martyrs of the Catholic Church, takes place each July.

== Relics of Catholic martyr Nicholas Postgate ==
Egton Bridge has strong connections with Father Nicholas Postgate who was born there. St Hedda's Church, Egton Bridge, a Roman Catholic parish church, is located in the village. It contains the relics of Nicholas Postgate, a martyr executed in 1679, for continuing to practise his faith.

St Hedda's Catholic Primary School is attached to the church.

== See also ==
- Listed buildings in Egton
