= Railways in Northallerton =

Railways in North Yorkshire, England

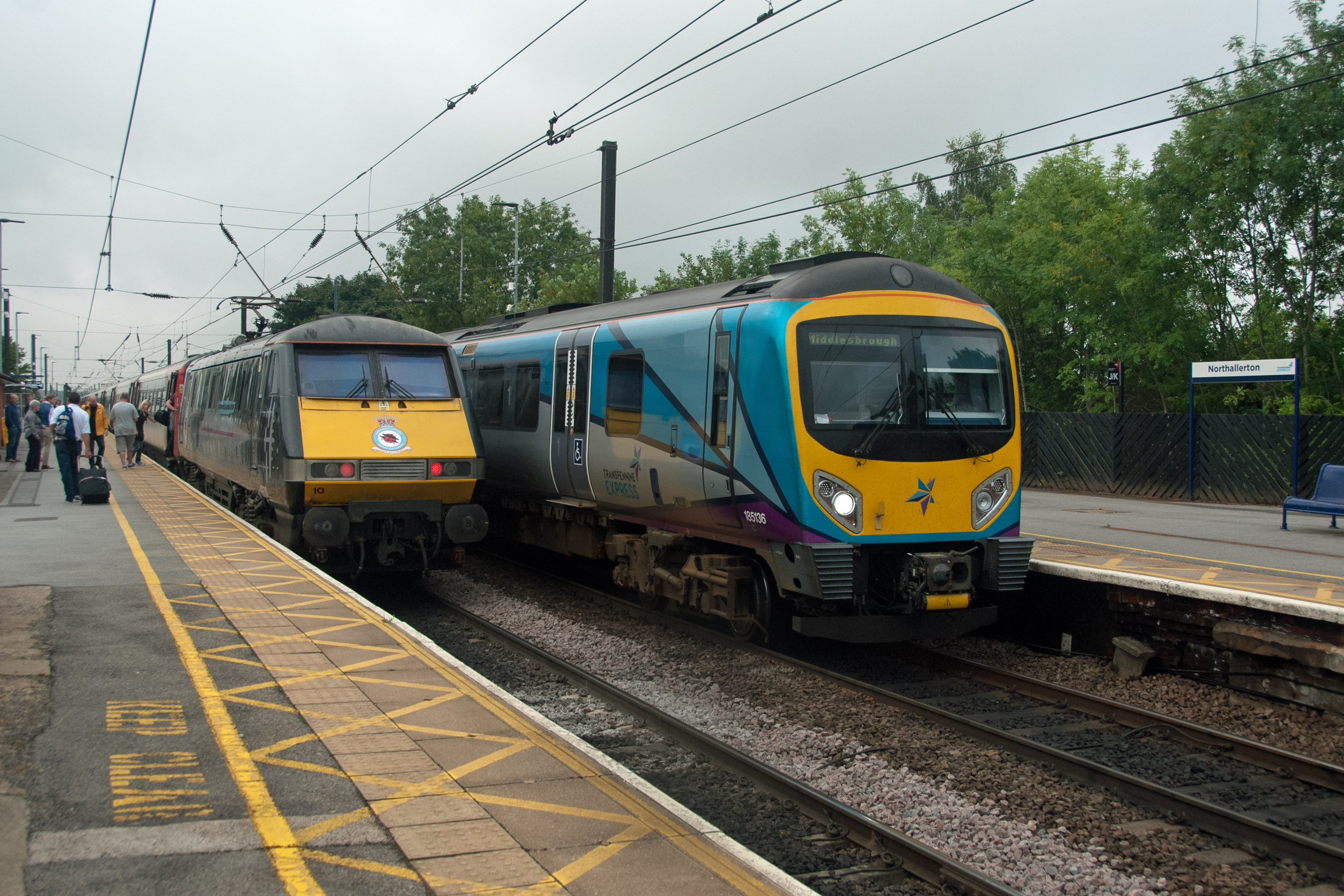
Class 91 (left) to London King's Cross and Class 185 to Middlesbrough, pass in Northallerton station

The network of railways in Northallerton, North Yorkshire, England, was constructed by three companies whose lines through the town were built between 1841 and 1852. They were all amalgamated into the North Eastern Railway (NER) which in turn was subsumed into the London and North Eastern Railway in 1923 and British Rail in 1948. British Rail closed two lines, the Wensleydale line in 1954 and a section of the Leeds Northern Railway to Harrogate in 1969. The Wensleydale line was retained as a freight branch and resurrected as a heritage railway in 2003 but the line to Harrogate closed completely. Despite closures and rationalisation, the station still is at a major junction on the East Coast Main Line.

Northallerton is on the East Coast Main Line and TransPennine Express Northern Line. The station is 200 miles (320 km) north of London King's Cross, 30 miles (48 km) north of York railway station and 175 miles (282 km) south of Edinburgh Waverley railway station.

== History ==
=== 1841–1901 ===
A railway between York and Darlington via Northallerton was suggested in 1826 in the York Herald, but the first railway, built by the Great North of England Railway (GNE), following the proposed route, only opened to mineral traffic in January 1841 and to passengers in March of the same year. When navvies were digging in the Castle Hills area of Northallerton, three Roman sarcophagi were unearthed which were taken to Darlington. Northallerton station opened in March 1841, and the "York Herald" described it as "in the Elizabethan Gothic style". Although much remodelled, the station is in the same location, with staggered platforms as when first built. Opening beyond Darlington to Newcastle did not come until 1844. In 1842, the GNE was absorbed into the Newcastle and Darlington Junction Railway (N&DJR), who, in 1846 gained Parliamentary approval for a line between Northallerton and Bedale. Work started the same year, but because of the unscrupulous practices of George Hudson, who controlled the N&DJR, work was halted in early 1848 The line opened between Northallerton and Bedale in March 1848. Various other schemes progressed the line through Wensleydale and the N&DJR became part of the York, Newcastle and Berwick Railway (YN&BR). The Wensleydale line left Northallerton westwards and had two connections with the mainline north of Northallerton; one at Castle Hills South and the other at Castle Hills North. Initially, access was from the north (the Darlington direction) which meant that trains originating in Northallerton had to reverse. This was remedied in 1882 with the opening of a direct curve onto the Wensleydale line.

The third line was the Leeds Northern Railway (LNR), previously the Leeds & Thirsk Railway, whose line opened in June 1852. The LNR line paralleled the YN&BR line at a lower level to the west. The GNE formation was built on an embankment that took it from what became Cordio Junction to Castle Hills on an embankment made from 252,641 cubic yards (193,158 m^{3}) of earth from when Castle Hills, north of the station, was levelled. This was the second most difficult engineering task undertaken by the company between York and Darlington after the stone viaduct at Croft. The LNR station, Northallerton Town was in the North Bridge area. The LNR passed under the YN&B just north of Northallerton station where a short tunnel was driven under the YN&B line at an angle of 23%. Tunnelling took place while keeping the upper line open. (Note: Some writers refer to the tunnel as a "long bridge". The Eastern Trackmaps diagrams refers to the formation as a tunnel.) No work took place until designs the tunnel were submitted by the LNR engineer, Joshua T Naylor, to the YN&B. The tunnel was constructed by driving piles into the GNE embankment and inserting a platform above them to support the rails. The tunnel was excavated and the space bricked up until the arches at either end could be completed. The tunnel is 26-foot (7.9 m) wide and 160-foot (49 m) long.

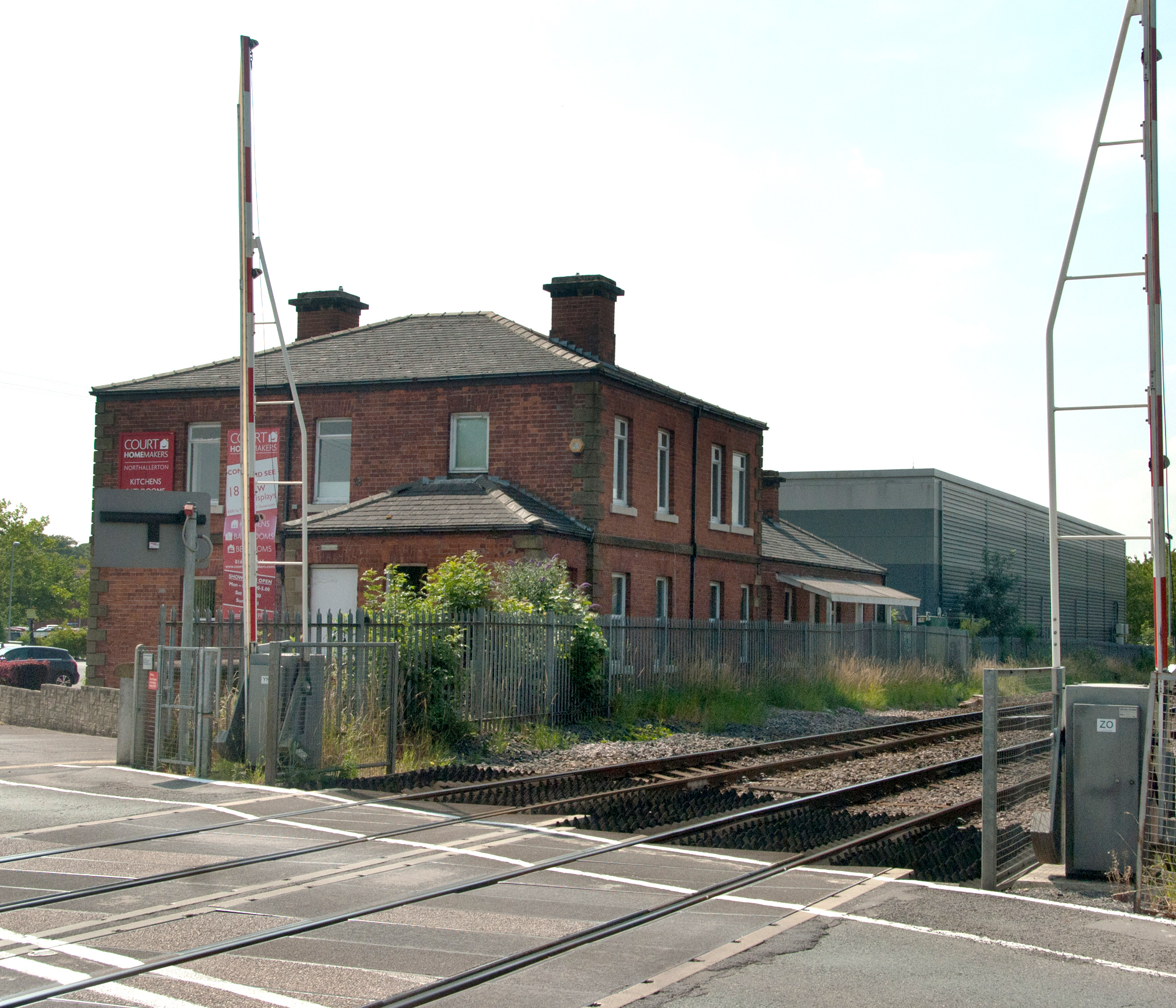
The former Northallerton Town railway station (LNR), now a private business

A spur at the north end of the station allowed trains to and from Melmerby to call at the station and access the line towards Eaglescliffe and Stockton in 1856. This route was taken via the Thirsk line from Melmerby and then north along what became the ECML. It along with the YN&B and the LNR, became part of the North Eastern Railway in 1854, (Note: Initially, the North Eastern Railway was created by the YN&B, the LNR and the York and North Midland Railway, with the Malton & Driffield Railway being amalgamated quite soon afterwards.) precipitated the closure of Northallerton Town station (LNR) although it remained open for well over a century as a goods depot. The line to Wensleydale was absorbed into the NER in 1858.

The LNR opened two platforms on its line adjacent to Northallerton station. They remained in use after mainline trains had been diverted through the station and via Thirsk. The low platforms were the terminus for local trains from Melmerby (via Sinderby until 1901, when the line from Melmerby was doubled and became the key line north, (Note: Doubling began in March 1899 and took two years.) and the line from Thirsk to Melmerby became secondary. When mainline trains were re-routed via the Melmerby to Northallerton line, the NER installed a junction at Cordio Wood to feed a spur into the south of the station. The low platforms became redundant and were abandoned but were resurrected during the Second World War and for engineering diversions. Access to the low platforms was via a path from the upper platforms. A door in the subway under the main running lines allowed passengers to interconnect between all platforms.

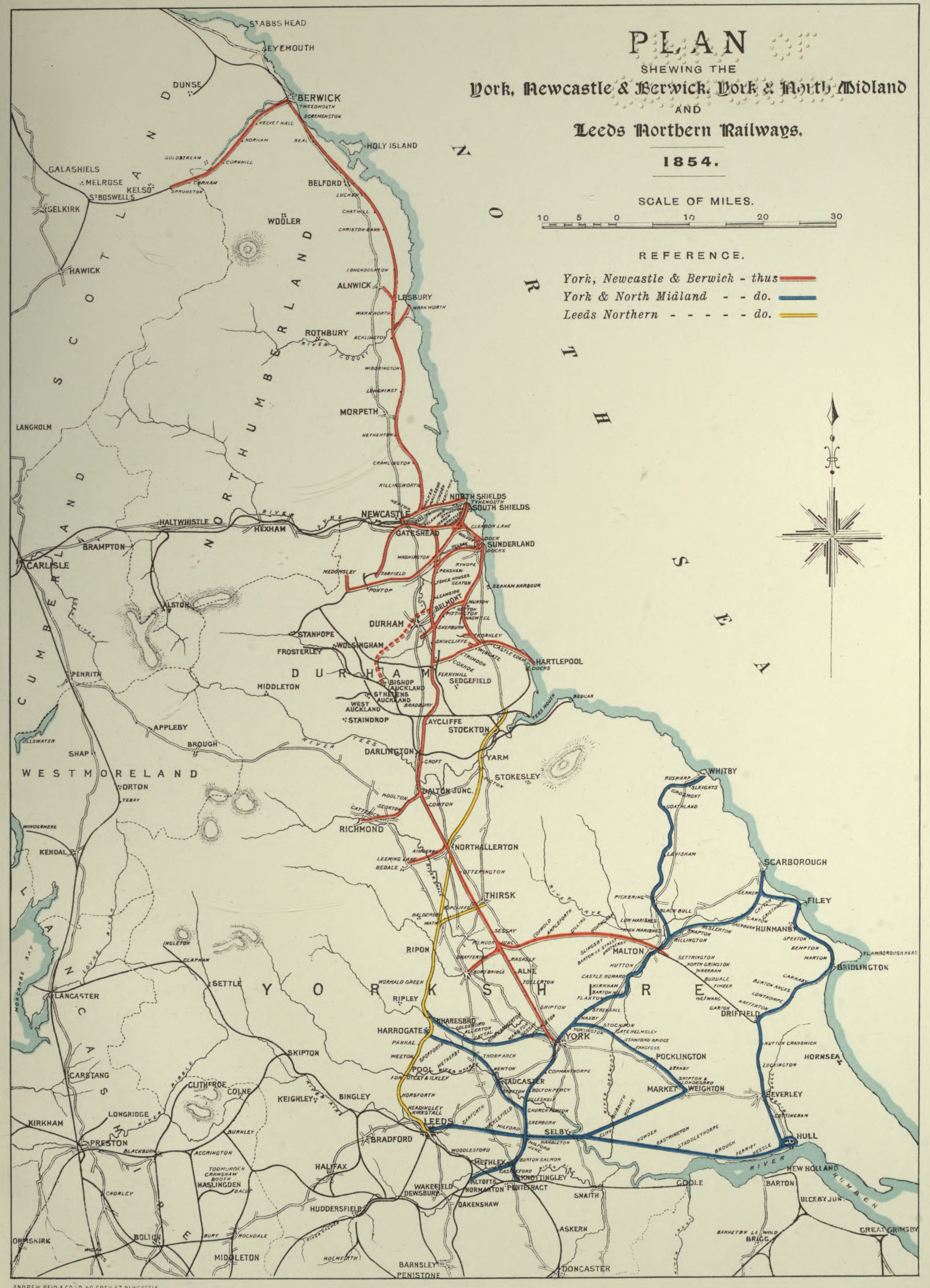

Other lines were planned, some gained Parliamentary approval. One was the York & Carlisle Railway which proposed a line from Northallerton and Bishop Auckland meeting near Barnard Castle and crossing the Pennines. The plan was abandoned in 1846 when the company merged with another.

=== 1901–1948 ===
In 1911, the station was remodelled when an improved connection was installed on the western side for access to the Wensleydale line. The down platform (Darlington-bound) was converted into an island platform with two running lines and a north-facing bay for Wensleydale services. Another bay was installed on the up platform (York-bound) which allowed services to depart south for the Ripon line, although the stopping service until 1901 had used the low platforms.

Starting in 1897, the tracks were "widened" in several sections between York and Northallerton. In 1931, the London and North Eastern Railway quadrupled most of the line and created the grade separated Longlands Junction south of Northallerton by 1933. It connected to the original formation from Ripon and allowed freight to avoid the station from the York direction. Trains heading south accessed the line south via the Longlands Tunnel (55 yards (50 m)) under the fast lines through the station. In 1942, the LNER installed up and down slow lines between Pilmoor and Thirsk as wartime necessities led to an upsurge in traffic. British Rail completed the quadrupling of the line in 1959 and 1960.

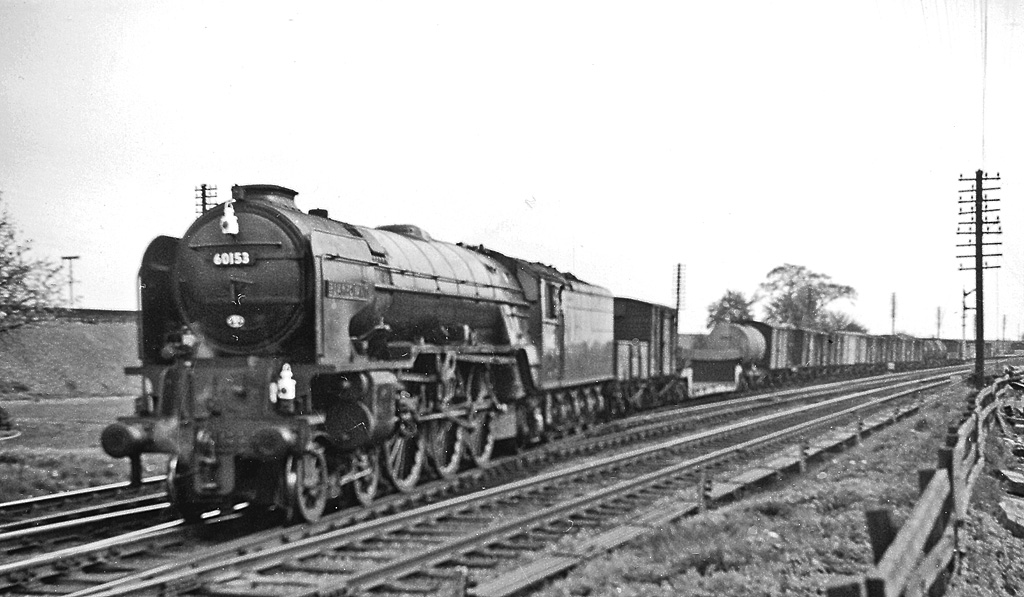
Northallerton - a Down freight heading for Teesside

In 1941, concerns about wartime bombing prompted building a chord from north of Romanby Road level crossing to Castle Hills Junction to connect the lower and upper lines and opened in November 1941. Should Northallerton station be bombed, it provided an alternative route. The new section was engineered with a unique feature; because of the gradient it was too low to bridge the Wensleydale line and too high to dive under the railway. Engineers created two moveable sections on rail wheels which when pushed together, created a bridge allowing trains bound to and from Wensleydale to traverse the section. If the wartime chord needed to be used, the moveable sections could be moved onto sidings on either side of the running lines. The bridge was constructed from two 17-foot (5.2 m) girders that straddled the lower running lines. The bridge completed the track circuits and prevented trains from running under when the bridge was in place, or from running over it if the lower wartime lines were in use. Trains could still access the Wensleydale line by reversing at Castle Hills Junction. Apart from testing, there is no evidence that the chord was used as Northallerton was rarely attacked (some bombs did land on one of the livestock marts). Closure of this section came in 1946.

=== 1948 – present day ===
When the passenger service ended on the Wensleydale line in April 1954 (due to its £14,000 per year loss-making revenue according to British Rail), the direct curve from the station onto the line was used less until it closed in 1970. Thereafter, freight services used Castle Hills siding and reversed into the loop to run-round. Some freight trains traversed the line with locomotives at both ends, a procedure known as top and tail, which removed the necessity to reverse and run-round. Services on the line comprised various loads, but up until December 1992, it conveyed limestone from Redmire to the British Steel complex at Redcar. The operation involved the train arriving from Teesside into the station via the Eaglescliffe line and reversing into the Castle Hills siding and continuing up the branch. On returning, the train reversed the process to access the Eaglescliffe line. In 1996, the Ministry of Defence paid £750,000 to upgrade the line to convey military vehicles in and out of Catterick Camp.

The last section of line to be closed, the Leeds Northern Line from Harrogate and Ripon, closed to passengers in 1967 but was not closed completely until 1969. The widened lines on the ECML, which provided four tracks between Northallerton and York, were an easier route south than some steeply graded sections around Ripon and Wetherby. The former LNR route was re-opened for services in the aftermath of the Thirsk rail crash. Some questioned the validity of closing the line citing the crash at Thirsk as reason to keep it open as an alternative line when the ECML would be closed. Various reports have detailed re-opening the line but some historical studies have suggested that the route should only open between Ripon south to Harrogate as there would be no business case to provide for a railway running further north. In 2015, North Yorkshire County Council submitted plans for transport schemes in North Yorkshire, the provision of a railway connecting Harrogate and Ripon to the ECML was among them. However, while the routeing of the railway north suggests that the freight railway through Northallerton could be closed, the plan calls for the junction of a re-opened line to be north of Northallerton town.

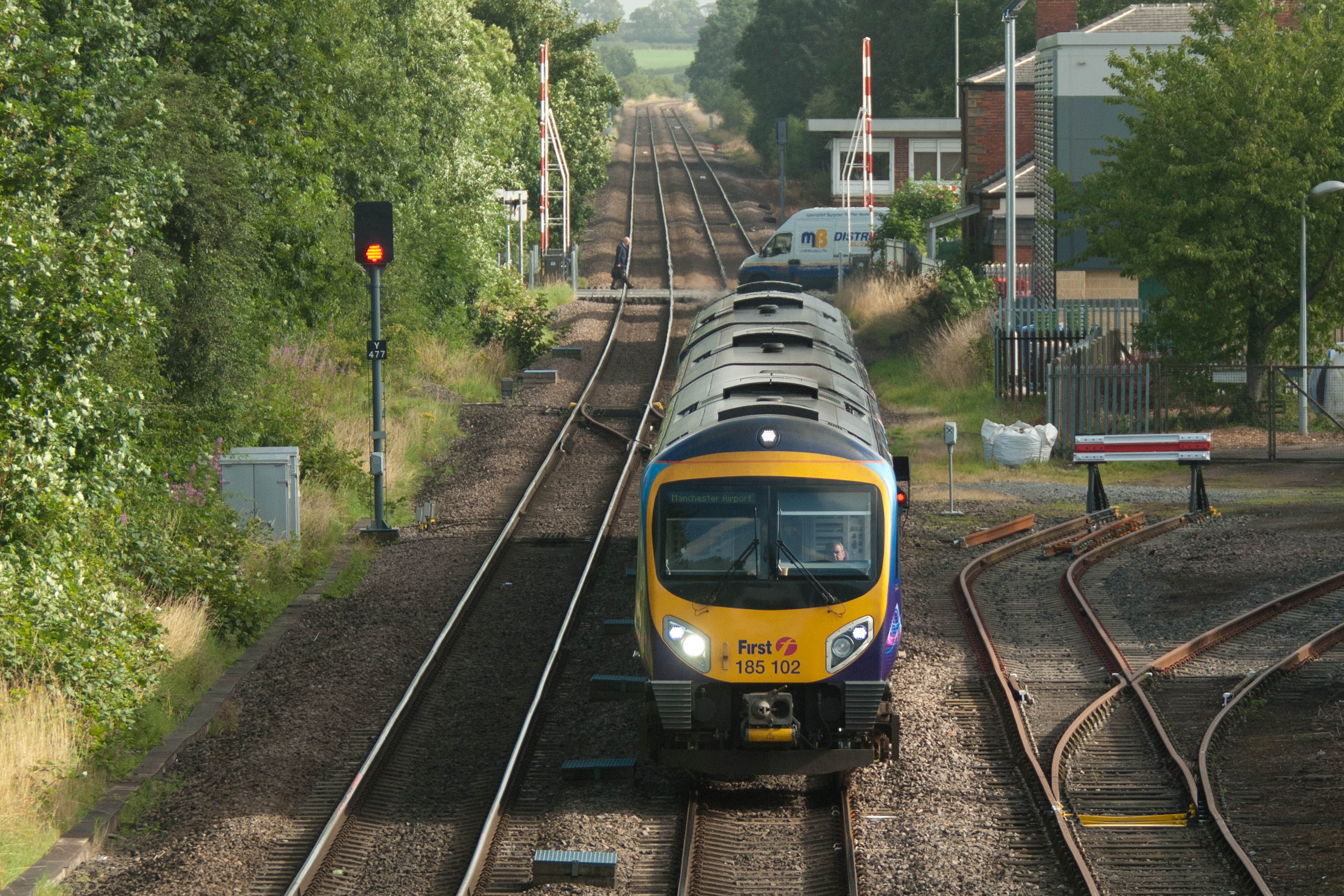
185102 at Northallerton having just passed over Low Gates level crossing. The engineers sidings are on the right

With the loss of the local and long-distance traffic on the Wensleydale and Harrogate lines, the bay platforms at the southern and northern ends of the station were taken out of commission. In 1982, British Rail announced its intention to revamp the dilapidated station, but with no funding from local authorities, the option to retain the Victorian buildings were limited. The down side buildings were removed in 1972–1973 and the up side lost its glass canopies in 1985. The station was remodelled between 1985 and 1986 with the down line on the western edge of the station (the down relief line) also being removed.

Local passenger services were lost on the Northallerton–Eaglescliffe route and most other passenger workings were transferred leaving freight using the line. British Rail started a named train to Midldlesbrough, the Cleveland Executive, but it ceased just before the ECML was electrified because of poor patronage north of Northallerton station. The route regained passenger services in the 1990s when Regional Railways introduced the Middlesbrough–Manchester Airport services which used the line rather than having to reverse at Darlington.

The ECML was electrified with a 25 kiloVolt Alternating Currency overhead catenary in 1991. The section between York and Northallerton was energised and tested in September 1990, electric services between London King's Cross and Edinburgh did not commence until July 1991. Electrification involved raising many bridges and spelt the end for the signalbox which opened in September 1939 and controlled a large section of the ECML. The signalbox closed in April 1990 when control was transferred to York IECC, although the control of the barriers (but not the signals) at the Low Gates level crossing was kept under the authority of the box at Low Gates. Signalling control now rests at the Rail Operating Centre at York.

The North Eastern Railway had pursued a scheme to electrify the line between Northallerton and Ferryhill via Stockton in 1922/1923. This line was also considered for electrification by British Rail for a proposed Channel Tunnel freight terminal on Teesside in 1994, but was not taken past the planning stage. In 2009, electrification was announced on the Transpennine route between Manchester Victoria, Huddersfield, Leeds and York and electrification of the line between Northallerton and Middlesbrough was mooted by Network Rail to provide through running between Manchester and Middlesbrough.

In 2017, a platform in the station was lengthened to enable the new Class 800 trains to call on East Coast services.

=== Wensleydale Railway ===
In 2003, the Wensleydale Railway signed a 99-year lease with Railtrack (the predecessor of Network Rail) and started services on the former Wensleydale line. Initially, trains ran to Leeming Bar as the eastern terminus, but in 2014 Northallerton West railway station opened. It is a temporary structure as the Wensleydale Railway was keen to reopen the closed 1970 curve and run trains into, or as close as possible to, Northallerton station. The north-facing bay platform used for the Wensleydale branch has been filled in and is part of the car park. The section between Leeming Bar and Northallerton does not see scheduled services as the level crossing on Yafforth road is in need of upgrading. In 2016, a train struck a car on the level crossing, and while the report did not attribute direct blame on the company, it said that the approaches and sighting of the level crossing should be improved. (Note: The level crossing at Yafforth was used to stage a crash under the banner "Operation Zebra Smash" in 1994. Railtrack set the crossing up with fake barriers and pushed a train onto the level crossing which smashed a Vauxhall Astra GTE.)

=== Goods ===
The North Eastern Railway applied for Parliamentary permission to build a freight yard between the Darlington and Eaglescliffe lines. It was given permission in 1901 and 1903 but nothing was built. The town had two goods yards; one at the station and the other next to the closed Northallerton Town station known as High and Low Goods Yard(s) respectively. Northallerton auction mart was next to the station and cattle were forwarded from the yard which also had coal drops. It remained a wagonload freight location until the early 1980s. The low yard was used for general merchandise. The yards had three and two sidings respectively which are used but for engineering purposes.

Northallerton forwarded the same types of freight as any other station on the local lines. The Wensleydale Pure Milk Society Dairy to the north west of the station forwarded milk products to London, Hull, Newcastle, Sunderland and Dewsbury and received milk from Wensleydale. The one wagon movement was a hand-pushed trolley operated by two workers, which was pushed into the station from the creamery. This conveyed cream for dispatch and the wagon was converted so that it could work on the line, and had a red flag placed on a very tall pole so that its movement could be observed by traincrews.

== Current services ==
Northallerton station is served by LNER services between Edinburgh and London King's Cross, TransPennine Express (TPE) services between Middlesbrough and Manchester airport, Newcastle and Liverpool Lime Street and Grand Central services between Sunderland and London King's Cross. Most LNER services and all CrossCountry services pass through at speed without stopping. One TPE service per hour in each direction does not stop at the station.

Most freight trains are routed via the old Leeds Northern Railway line on the lower tracks avoiding the station. This means freight trains on the lower lines cross four level crossings in the town. From south to north they are;

- Boroughbridge Road Gates: this takes the A167 across the freight lines and under the fast lines.
- Romanby Road: leads the local road from Romanby into Northallerton
- Springwell Lane: a road across the freight lines to a small number of houses and provides foot access to Northallerton West railway station
- Low Gates: takes the A167 Darlington road across the Northallerton–Eaglescliffe Line. This level crossing is the busiest as all trains to and from the Middlesbrough area cross here.

Low Gates level crossing often has its barriers down at peak time for 25 minutes in an hour. This leads to traffic tailbacks on the A167 which can take 15 minutes for the traffic to clear. Problems with queuing traffic and congestion in the town have led to calls for the level crossing to be bypassed, bridged or closed. One suggestion was that the corridor the freight lines occupy be turned into an inner ring road and a new rail formation be cut further north to provide a new chord to the Middlesbrough line from the ECML further north than the current station. This would mean traffic could use the trackbed to access the A167 without going through the town as there is no bypass around the town for road traffic.

A bridge to the north of the town, which opened in December 2022, is expected to provide some road traffic relief to the crossing at Low Gates.

== Stations and engine sheds ==
- Northallerton railway station; opened in 1841, was completely remodelled in 1986 when buildings on the up side of the line (York bound) were demolished. The station is run by TransPennine Express, with other services being provided by LNER and Grand Central. The last recorded use of the low platforms was in February 1961 after the station was damaged by a derailment. Trains were diverted via the low platforms and a diversion at Eaglescliffe to regain the main line at Darlington.
- Northallerton Town railway station; opened in 1852 and closed in 1856
- Northallerton West railway station; opened in 2014. The platform at Northallerton West is a semi-permanent structure that sits on a passing loop. Only one platform is provided (on the south side of the line) and access is on foot across Springwell Lane Level Crossing.

The first engine shed in the town was located adjacent to Northallerton Town railway station. It was a single road shed which opened in 1852 and remained open after the route to Northallerton station opened in 1856. It closed in 1858.

A two-road engine shed was provided for services on the Wensleydale branch. It was built in 1857 and replaced in 1881 and an extension was added in 1886. The shed was adjacent to the low platforms at Northallerton station and had one through and one dead-end line. The shed was coded as 51J under British Railways as a sub-shed of Darlington. With the withdrawal of passenger services on the Wensleydale line, the shed closed in March 1963, nine years after passenger traffic had ceased on the branch. The site is now in private business use.

The turntable was located in the goods yard adjacent to the main station. It could accommodate locomotives up to a length of 42 feet (13 m). Its location at the station rather than adjacent to the locomotive shed was a legacy from when Leeds Northern services terminated in the station and ran round before proceeding south. An engine moving from the station to the locomotive shed had to travel over 1 mile (1.6 km) and negotiate two junctions to reach it. The turntable was next to the coaling plant and watering facility; none of the structures were relocated to the engine shed on the lower lines.

The water tank was situated between the low and high platforms and held over 30,000 imperial gallons (140,000 L; 36,000 US gal) of water. As it was located on low ground, it was built to a height above that of the upper-level platforms to allow enough pressure to feed the water column by the turntable, making it significantly higher than would normally be expected.

== Incidents ==
- 1870: A boiler explosion occurred in a steam locomotive in the station; whilst there were some injuries, no-one was killed.
- July 1870: The landlord of the Golden Lion Hotel was using the foot crossing to access platform 2 when he stopped to look at his watch. He received fatal injuries from the crash. Mainly because of this accident (but also on account of other people sustaining injuries in the same location) a subway was opened soon afterwards to replace the foot crossing.
- 21 November 1889: A driver who was due to be shown the road for the line between Northallerton and Hawes, jumped on board the guard's van of the train whilst it passed through the station. He fell from the van onto the platform and his arm was badly smashed between the van and the platform. It was amputated at Northallerton's Cottage Hospital.
- 4 October 1894: A Scotch Express heading south had experienced trouble with brakes and a pilot engine was attached at Darlington. The pilot loco at the front of the train assumed that the other driver was looking out for the signals, whereas the other driver assumed that as the pilot loco was at the front, he was looking out for the signals. The train went through a signal at danger and collided with the rear end of a goods train just north of Northallerton. A passenger was killed.
- 23 December 1894: A gale which struck most of Northern England, stripped the panels from the station roof and ripped off other fittings. No injuries or deaths were recorded.
- In November 1913, a locomotive from the Wensleydale line was signalled onto the main line at Castle Hills, but was not cleared to run further south by the Northallerton signal box. The locomotive was returning to the shed and so had to run through on the main line to get to the shed. The signallers forgot about the light engine and two different signallers both accepted an express from the north. The driver of the light engine was surprised to see the distant signals being raised, which would not be necessary for him as he was only just going past the station. On realising something was wrong, the driver saw the express running towards him. He started his engine to try and get clear, but both he and his fireman baled out onto the platform as their engine passed through Northallerton station. The express came to a halt and the light engine was found a little south of Northallerton having run out of steam.
- September 1935: the driver of a northbound express coming off the line from Ripon saw an express on the main line was heading for the station. The express from Ripon performed an emergency stop. It was determined that the driver of the express on the main line had been mistaken by the green signals further down the line through Northallerton station.
- February 1961: a parcels train derailed in the station ripping up the track and demolished part of the island roof. The newspaper and parcels were shredded in the crash which created a "snowstorm" effect. Despite it happening in daytime and the station busy with passengers, the only injury was to the guard of the train who was sent home from hospital on the same day.
- 28 August 1979: an Intercity 125 unit from London King's Cross to Edinburgh derailed south of the station but remained upright. The cause was attributed to low gearbox oil which caused the pinion to seize and lock the leading wheels on the train in place. With the rear power car pushing the train, this caused the flanges on the locked wheels to deform and strike the points south of the station, which buckled the rail. This caused the whole train to derail but it stayed upright and only one person required hospitalising overnight.
- 3 August 2016: a train on the heritage Wensleydale Railway struck a car on a level crossing near Yafforth just west of Northallerton. Three people suffered injuries; the car driver and two passengers on the train.

== Gallery ==
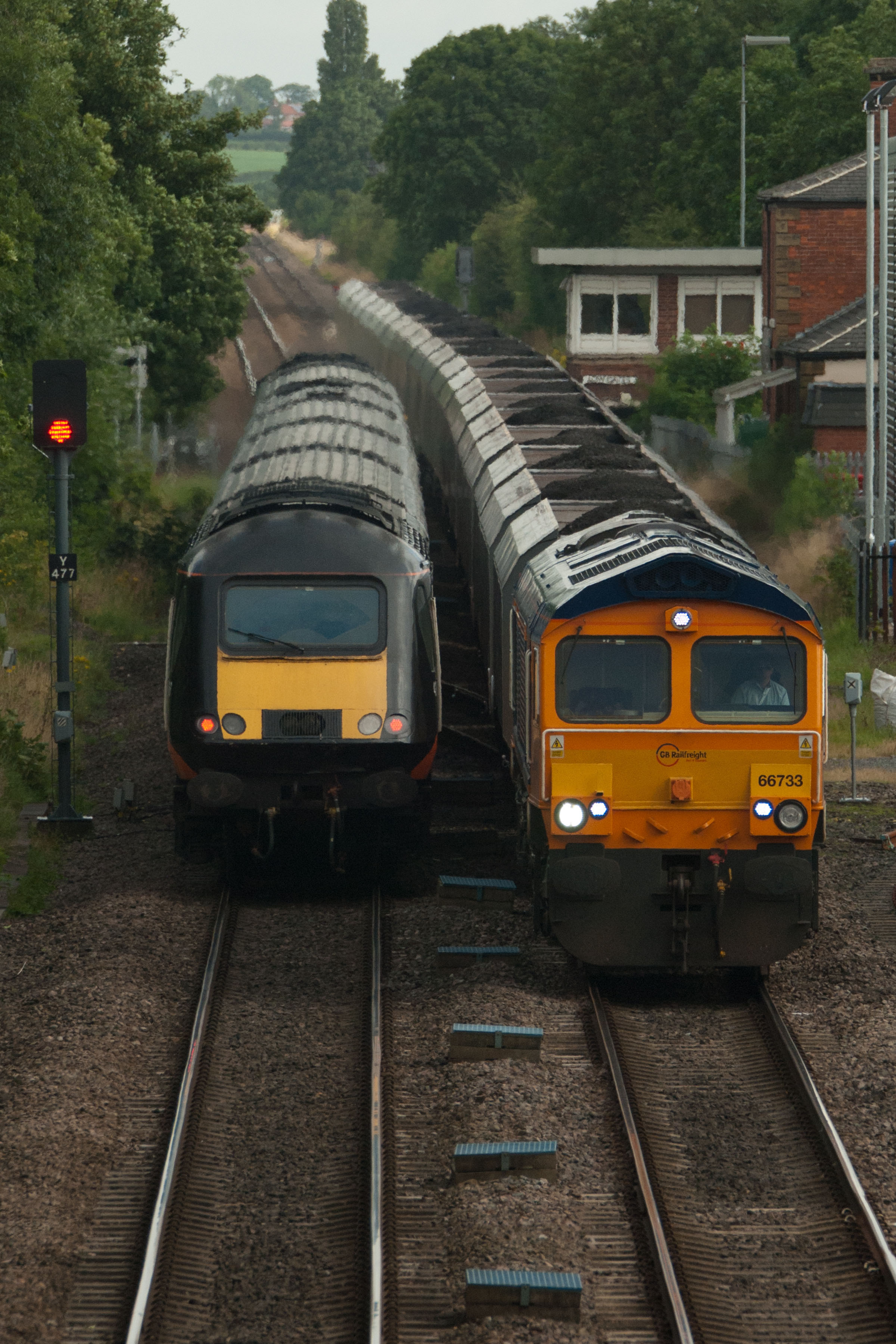
66733 and GC HST at Northallerton Low Gates

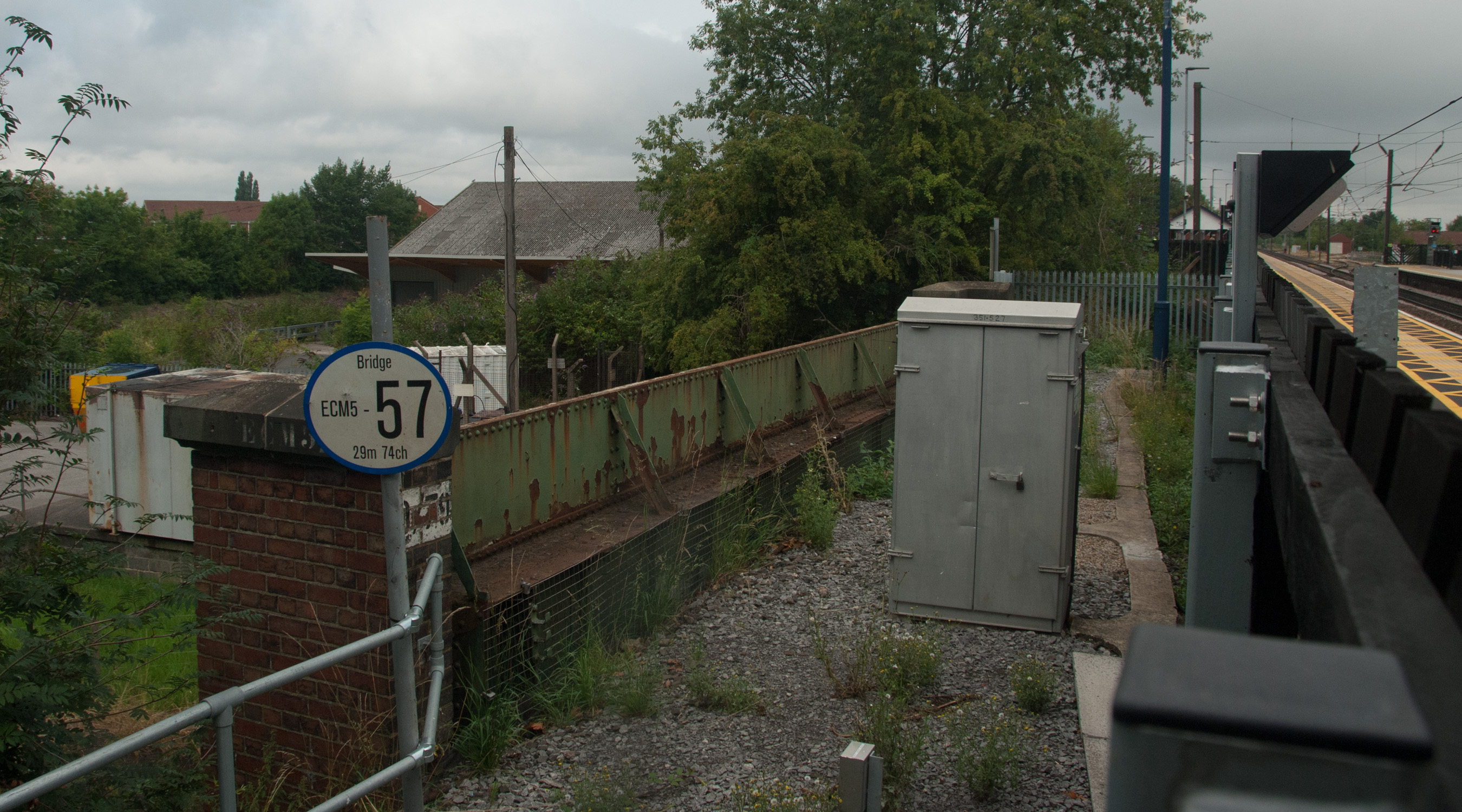
Former island line at Northallerton station

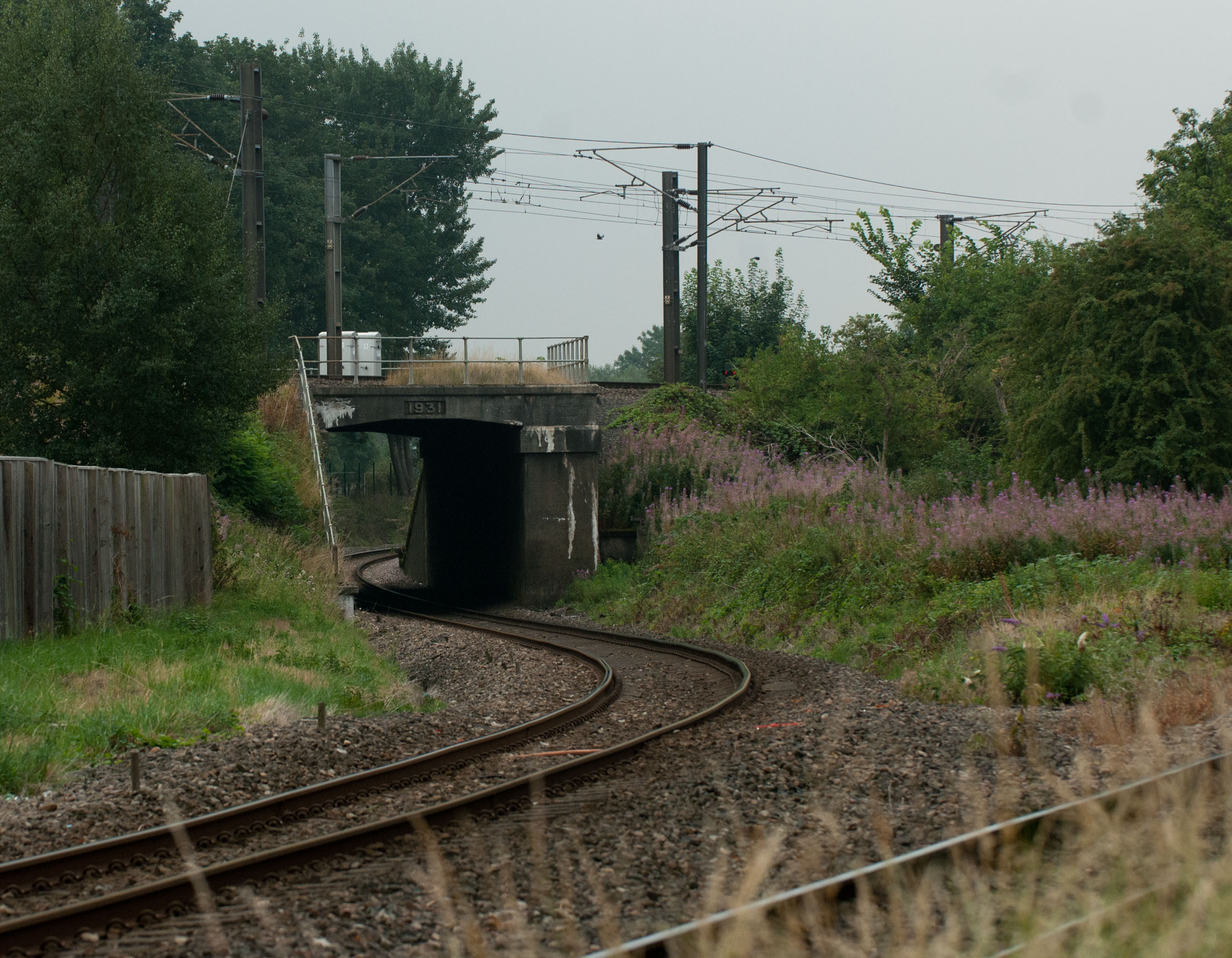
Longlands Tunnel

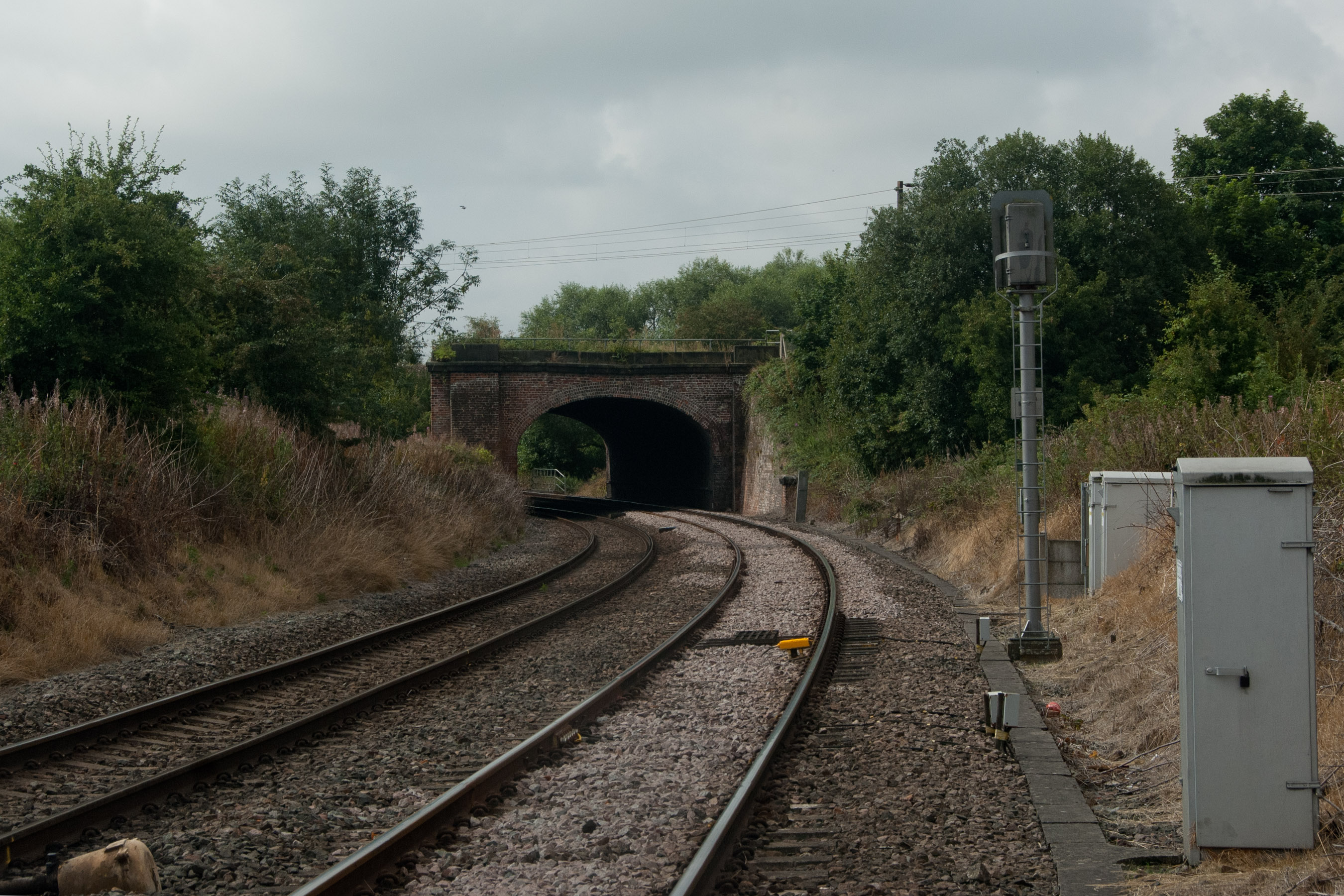
Northallerton Tunnel

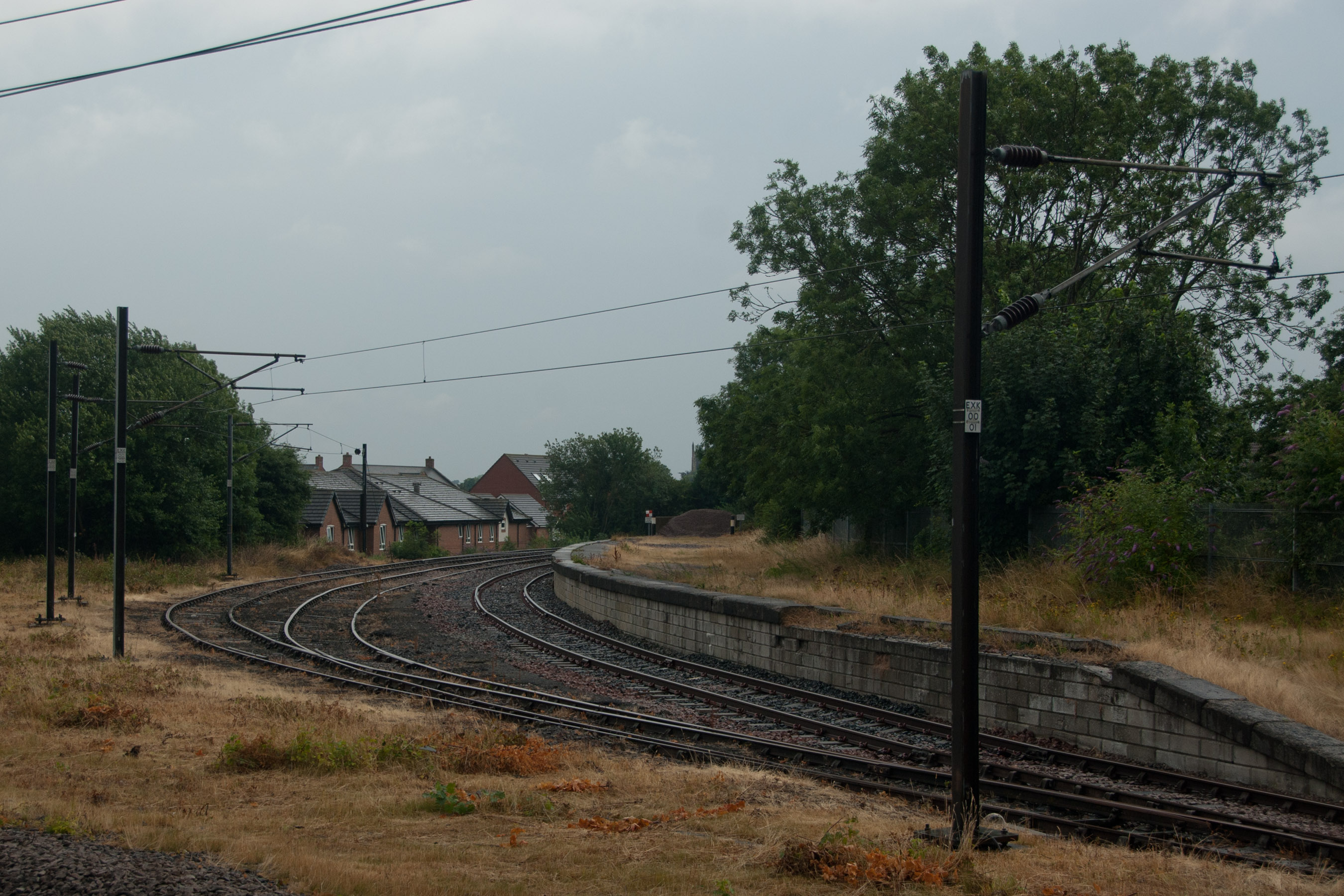
The former goods yard by Northallerton station
