= Masham railway station =

Disused railway station in North Yorkshire, England

Masham
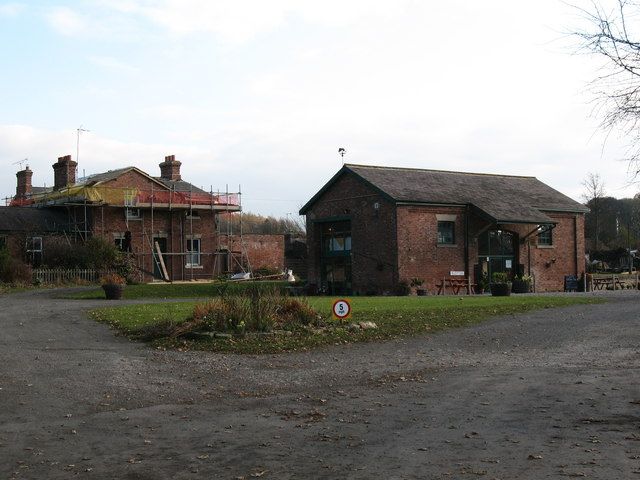
- Former station site, Masham

General information
- Location: Mashamshire; North Yorkshire; England
- Coordinates: 54°13′33″N 1°38′41″W
- Grid reference: SE232811

Other information
- Status: Disused

History
- Pre-grouping: North Eastern Railway
- Post-grouping: London and North Eastern Railway

Key dates
- 9 June 1875: Station opened
- 1 January 1931: Station closed to passengers
- 11 November 1963: station closed completely
Location

Masham railway station was the terminus of the Melmerby to Masham branch line serving the town of Masham in North Yorkshire, England. It was on the eastern side of the River Ure, so as such, was actually in Burton-on-Ure. The line operated between 1875 and 1931 for passenger traffic, but was retained for minimal freight train use until 1963.

== History ==
Masham station opened on the same day as the line did, with services commencing on 9 June 1875. The population at the time of opening was just over 3,600, but the station retained healthy outward traffic in the form of timber and livestock.

The station was located on the left bank of the River Ure, 1 mile (1.6 km) away from Masham in the neighbouring parish of Burton-on-Ure rather than across the river in Masham itself. In 1901, a narrow gauge railway was built for the purposes of constructing reservoirs in Colsterdale, which meant that a section of railway then went north from the station crossing the river, but it bypassed the town of Masham to the north.

The station area had a single-road locomotive shed which stabled the one steam engine used on the four daily out and back workings to Ripon. After closure to passengers, the branch was normally worked by a locomotive from Starbeck Shed in Harrogate. When Starbeck shed closed in 1959, the branch was worked by an engine from York.

In October 1908, an over laden train ran through the station and across the Melmerby to Masham road (now the A6108) and into the narrow gauge exchange yard just north of the road. The wagons were badly damaged, but there were no injuries or deaths. The driver had lost control on the 1-in-61 gradient into the station's goods yard.

The station was closed to passengers in January 1931, but continued receiving deliveries of small amounts of goods traffic until 1963. The issue of the railway being open just to deliver coal to the stationmasters and fresh water to the crossing keeper's cottages was raised in Parliament by the MP for Darlington at that time.

The station buildings are now private dwellings and the goods shed has since been converted into a cafe and gallery. A blue plaque adorns the side of the good shed commemorating the Leeds Pals, who arrived by train at Masham station in September 1914 and marched up to Colsterdale to begin their training for war.

Preceding station	Historical railways	Following station
Tanfield; Line and station closed	North Eastern Railway; Masham branch	Terminus; Line and station closed
