= Tanfield railway station =

Disused railway station in North Yorkshire, England

Tanfield
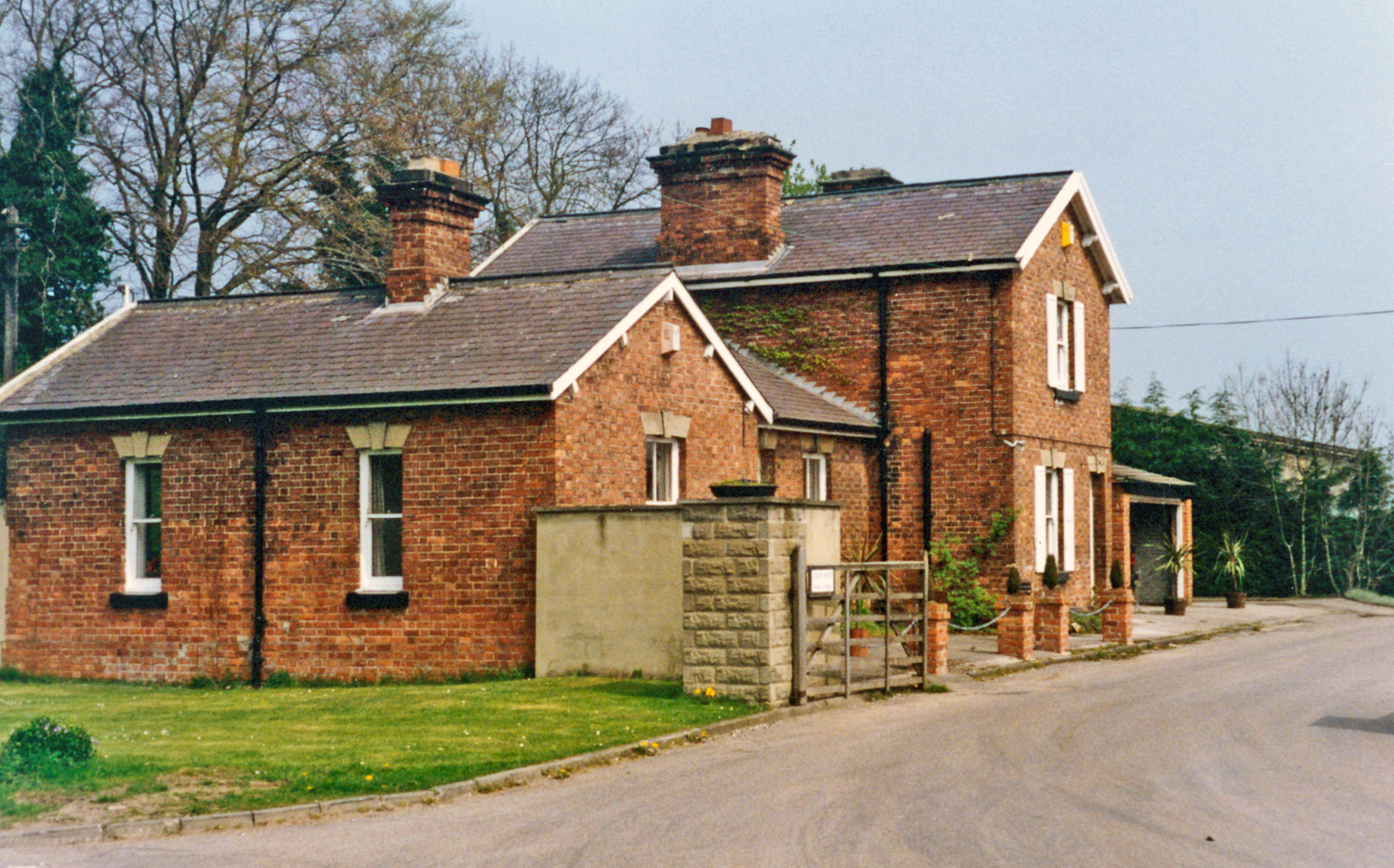
- Tanfield former railway station

General information
- Location: North Yorkshire; England
- Coordinates: 54.207041°N 1.590790°W
- Platforms: 1

Other information
- Status: Disused

History
- Original company: North Eastern Railway
- Pre-grouping: North Eastern Railway
- Post-grouping: London and North Eastern Railway

Key dates
- 9 June 1875: Station opened
- 1 January 1931: Closed to passengers
- 11 November 1963: Closed completely
Location

Tanfield railway station was a railway station serving the community of West Tanfield on the Masham Line in North Yorkshire, England. The station was opened with the line in June 1875 and was closed to passengers in January 1931. Full closure of the line was effected in 1963.

== History ==
The station opened in June 1875 as the only intermediate one between the town of Masham and the junction of the line with the Leeds Northern Railway at Melmerby. Passenger trains continued on southwards from Melmerby to terminate at Ripon railway station. In May 1891, six trains a day were scheduled to call at Tanfield, which had been reduced to four each way by 1902. The journey to Masham took six minutes, with that to Ripon taking seventeen. By the time of the line's closure to passengers by the London and North Eastern Railway (LNER) in 1931, just four trains a day were calling at Tanfield. The station was furnished with a passing loop, but only the south side of the station had a platform.

The station had low passenger numbers and only issued 7,500 tickets in 1911. Goods mostly consisted of the outward flows of livestock and manure, for which a 3 tonnes (3.3 tons) crane was provided in the goods yard. During the Second World War, ammunition storage in the area increased the number of trains through the station for offloading and forwarding too. The British Army supplied the LNER with extra staff to supplement the two railway workers. Over 76,000 tonnes (84,000 tons) of munitions were stored near the station which were forwarded out on 42 armament trains in the weeks leading up to D-Day.

The line closed to traffic on 11 November 1963. After closure, the station building became derelict but was renovated in 1973 and is now a private dwelling. The station footprint and goods yard was the location of some light industrial units until 2017 when they were converted into a small housing estate.

Preceding station	Historical railways	Following station
Melmerby; Line and station closed	North Eastern Railway; Masham branch	Masham; Line and station closed
