= Topcliffe =

Topcliffe may refer to:

== Places ==
- Topcliffe, North Yorkshire, a village and civil parish in England
  - Topcliffe Castle, an abandoned castle
  - Topcliffe railway station (closed)
  - RAF Topcliffe, a Royal Air Force station
- Topcliffe, West Yorkshire, a United Kingdom location in Morley, Leeds

== People ==
- John Topcliffe (died 1513), English-born judge
- Richard Topcliffe (1531–1604), English priest hunter
