= Baldersby railway station =

Disused railway station in North Yorkshire, England

Baldersby
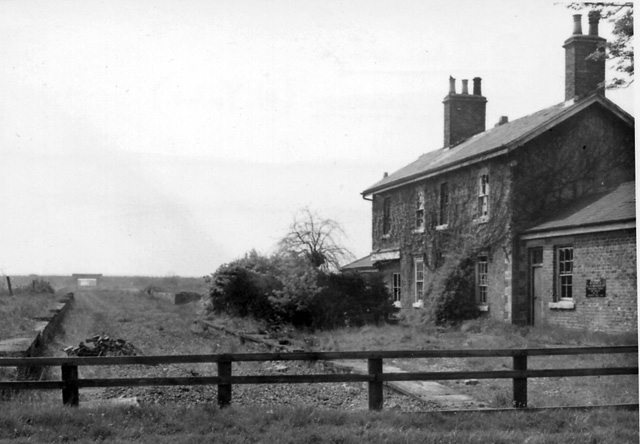
- Baldersby railway station in 1965

General information
- Location: Baldersby, North Yorkshire; England
- Coordinates: 54.196747°N 1.460546°W
- Grid reference: SE352780
- Platforms: 2

Other information
- Status: Disused

History
- Original company: Leeds and Thirsk Railway
- Pre-grouping: North Eastern Railway
- Post-grouping: London and North Eastern Railway

Key dates
- 1 June 1848: Station opens
- July 1855: Station renamed Baldersby Gate
- April 1863: Station renamed Baldersby
- 14 September 1959: Station closes
Location

Baldersby railway station was a railway station serving the village of Baldersby in North Yorkshire, England. It was located on a line from Melmerby, north of Ripon, to Thirsk on the East Coast Main Line.

== History ==
Opened by the Leeds and Thirsk Railway, it became part of the London and North Eastern Railway during the Grouping of 1923. The line then passed on to the Eastern Region of British Railways on nationalisation in 1948. It was then closed by the British Transport Commission

== The site today ==
The old trackbed peters out in a field and nothing remains of the station.

| Preceding station | Disused railways | Following station |
|---|---|---|
| Melmerby | North Eastern Railway; Leeds and Thirsk Railway | Topcliffe |
