= Sinderby =

Village and civil parish in North Yorkshire, England

Coordinates: 54.2317°N 1.4721°W

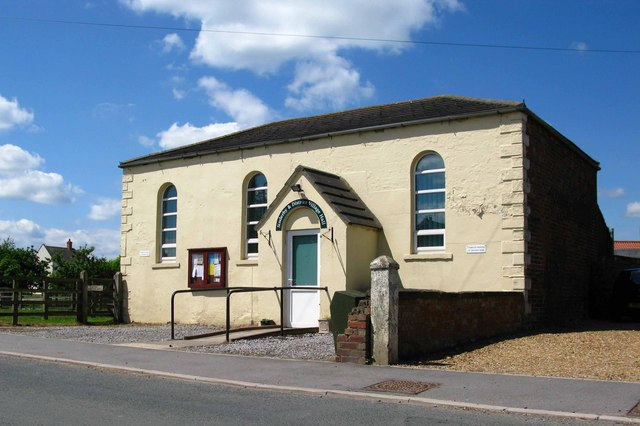
- Sinderby village hall

- Location within North Yorkshire
- Population: 137 (2011 census)
- OS grid reference: SE345819
- Unitary authority: North Yorkshire
- Ceremonial county: North Yorkshire
- Region: Yorkshire and the Humber
- Country: England
- Sovereign state: United Kingdom
- Post town: THIRSK
- Postcode district: YO7
- Police: North Yorkshire
- Fire: North Yorkshire
- Ambulance: Yorkshire

Sinderby is a village and civil parish in North Yorkshire, England, located 223 miles (359 km) north of London, just east of the A1(M).

The village of Sinderby includes housing and some small businesses. There is a village hall beside the 1990s village green.

== History ==
In 1835, a small Wesleyan chapel was built in Chapel Field, adjoining the village and traces of it remained in 1848. Sinderby was a township until 1866 when it became a civil parish.

In 1590, an estate of 21 acres of land in Sinderby was given to nearby Pickhill Church.

Sinderby railway station opened in 1852 on the Leeds–Northallerton Railway; closed to passengers in 1962 and completely in 1963. From 2002 until 2009 a number of British Railways Mark 2 coaches were stored behind the former station building.

From 1974 to 2023 it was part of the Hambleton District, it is now administered by the unitary North Yorkshire Council.

== Demographics ==
=== Population ===
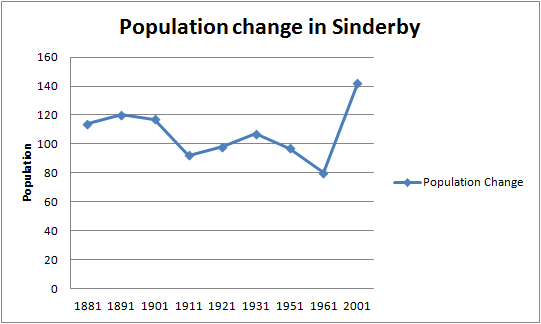
Population changes in the parish of Sinderby between 1881 and 2001

The first recorded census of Sinderby occurred in 1881 with the population being 114 people. A census was carried out every ten years up until 1961, offering information on such statistics as total population, population change, gender and area over the time the census has been carried out. The population in the parish stayed roughly the same until 1911 when it drastically decreased to 92 people, possibly being due to the First World War. This fluctuation appeared again between 1931 and 1961, with the census data showing the population in 1931 being 107 people and then rapidly declining up until 1961 when the population was as low as 80 people according to census records. There are no census records from 1941 due to the Second World War. From 1961 onwards the census data changed, listing the information gathered in some places by wards and no longer by parishes.

According to the 2001 census, the headcount of the parish of Sinderby was 142 people, and the male:female ratio is split almost perfectly, with there being 70 males and 72 females residing in 55 households. The parish consists of mainly families, with 31 people being aged between 5–15 years old and 49 people aged between 25 and 44 years old.

=== Occupation structure ===
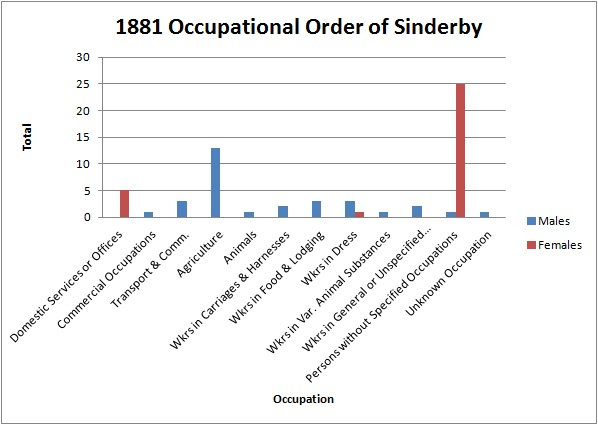
Occupation data for Sinderby in 1881

The 1881 census on inhabitants occupations provides information on what occupational category the population of Sinderby fall into. The data shows that the large proportion of males worked in agriculture, with 13 of the 31 males falling into this category. The rest of the male population were employed across a variety of different jobs, including transport, food and lodging and animals. In contrast, almost all females were without specific occupations, with 25 of the 31 being part of this category. However, a small minority of the female population worked in domestic services or office work.

In 2001 the number of people employed was 98, with 76 of these people being economically active. Over half of those employed are males, and the average distance travelled to work is around 25 km, showing how it is necessary for them to migrate to more urban areas in search of work.

== Transport ==
=== Road ===
Sinderby Lane, Lime Lane and Westfield Lane connect Sinderby to the B6267 and A6055.

=== Public Transport ===
Sinderby is on the 147 bus route between Ripon and Thirsk.

The nearest railway station is Thirsk.
