= Listed buildings in Burton Leonard =

Burton Leonard is a civil parish in the county of North Yorkshire, England. It contains eight listed buildings that are recorded in the National Heritage List for England. All the listed buildings are designated at Grade II, the lowest of the three grades, which is applied to "buildings of national importance and special interest". The parish contains the village of Burton Leonard and the surrounding area. All the listed buildings are in the village, and consist of houses and associated structures, farmhouses and farm buildings, a church and a drinking fountain.

== Buildings ==
Name and location	Photograph	Date	Notes
Old Hall; 54.07018°N 1.49988°W		Mid-18th century	The house has a timber framed core, it has been encased in limestone with some cobbles, and has quoins, and a roof of pantile and stone slate. There are two storeys and a complex plan. The doorway has a chamfered surround and tie-stone jambs. Most of the windows have chamfered mullions, some with hood moulds, and there are small pane windows, and a horizontally-sliding sash window.
Stable and outbuilding, Burton Hall Farm; 54.07034°N 1.50185°W		Early to mid-18th century (probable)	The farm building incorporates some 16th century material. It is in limestone and timber framing, and has a pantile roof with an eaves course of stone slate. There are two storeys, eight bays, an outshut to the west, and two bays to the north. The openings include stable doors, one with a segmental brick arch, windows, loading doors and slit vents. On the left return is a stone stairway leading to a door with a lintel and a three-piece keystone.
Hill Top Farm Barn; 54.06926°N 1.50466°W		Mid-18th century	The barn, which has been converted for residential use, is in limestone and cobbles, with quoins, and a pantile roof with an eaves course of stone slate. There are five bays, and it contains a central cart entrance, a doorway and slit vents, all with quoined jambs.
Burton Hall Farmhouse; 54.07052°N 1.50177°W		Early 19th century (probable)	The farmhouse is in stone with limestone quoins, brick dressings at the rear, and a pantile roof with gable copings. There are two storeys, three bays, and a rear outshut. In the centre is a gabled porch with bargeboards, and the windows are sashes with segmental heads. At the rear the windows are horizontally-sliding, and the doorway has a hood with bargeboards.
Oakley House; 54.06852°N 1.50108°W		Early 19th century	The house is in limestone with moulded gutter brackets and a pantile roof. There are two storeys and two bays, and a two-bay rear wing. The central doorway has a fanlight and the windows are sashes, the openings on the front with flat arches and voussoirs. The rear wing has quoins, and one of the windows is a horizontally-sliding sash.
Garden wall to the south of Burton Hall Farmhouse; 54.07032°N 1.50160°W		Early to mid-19th century	The garden wall is in stone and pebbles, it is lined in red brick, and has stone coping. The south wall is about 1 metre (3 ft 3 in) high, with a central gate, and is ramped up to about 1.5 metres (4 ft 11 in) at the ends. The side walls are ramped up to about 2.5 metres (8 ft 2 in), and each contains a gateway.
Drinking fountain 54.06981°N 1.50100°W		Mid-19th century	The drinking fountain against the churchyard wall of St Leonard's Church is in cast iron and is about 1.2 metres (3 ft 11 in) high. It consists of a fluted column with a roll-moulded base, and a collar with a lion mask spout. On the top is a fluted domed cover with a bud finial, and there is a handle mount to the right.
St Leonard's Church; 54.06982°N 1.50044°W		1877–78	The church, designed by C. Hodgson Fowler in Gothic Revival style, is in magnesian limestone with a red tile roof. It consists of a nave, a south porch and a lower chancel. On the west gable is a bellcote with a pediment and a cross. The porch entrance has a double-chamfered surround, and above it is a niche containing a statue. At the west end is a paired two-light window, and the east window has five lights.
