= Northallerton engine shed =

Former railway engine shed in North Yorkshire, England

Northallerton
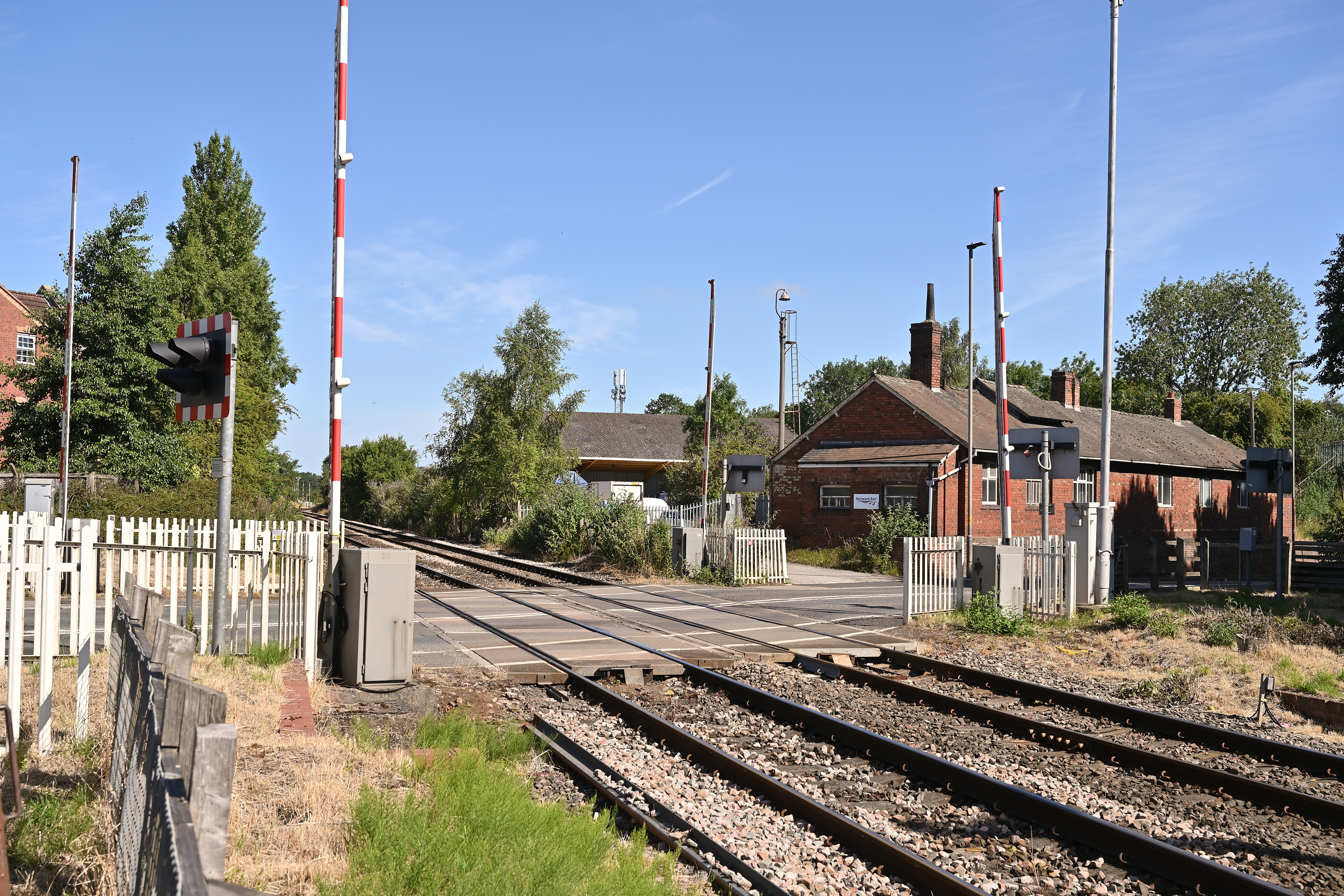
- The view over the A167 road and the railway line at Northallerton Boroughbridge Road crossing; the location of the shed is where the building is in the middle with a mobile phone mast behind it
- Interactive map of Northallerton

Location
- Location: Northallerton, North Yorkshire, England
- Coordinates: 54.332°N 1.442°W
- OS grid: SE363931

Characteristics
- Type: Locomotive
- Roads: 2

History
- Opened: c. 1857
- Closed: 4 March 1963
- Original: North Eastern Railway
- Post-grouping: London and North Eastern Railway
- BR region: North Eastern
- Former depot code: 51J

Northallerton engine shed (also known as Northallerton motive power depot (MPD)), was a steam locomotive shed on the western side of Northallerton railway station in North Yorkshire, England. The depot was opened in the late 1850s, and stabled steam engines for use mainly on the Wensleydale line, but sometimes on the several lines that radiated out from Northallerton. The depot closed in March 1963, and all locomotives were transferred to Darlington shed.

== History ==
The depot was located besides the Leeds Northern Railway line on the west side of the passenger station. When built, but before the shed opened, the Leeds Northern Railway did not have a connection with Northallerton station; a spur from the station to the Leeds Northern at the north-east side of the station was built in 1856. When a connection was made to the south of the town (at Cordio Junction), passenger trains were diverted onto the upper lines, leaving the depot aligned next to the lower level freight avoiding lines. The first reference to a shed at this location was in a tender of April 1857, for which the price of just over £244 (equivalent to £24,000 in 2025) was accepted. In 1881 a new shed was authorised, and this was built to accommodate two engines within it, being completed in 1886 at a cost of £728 (equivalent to £82,000 in 2025). Although the first part of the Wensleydale line to Leeming Bar was opened in 1848, some nine years before Northallerton shed opened, the primary purpose of the Northallerton MPD was to provide traction for the Wensleydale line. Prior to 1857, a small engine shed at Leeming Bar housed the engine that worked the first and last trains of the day; but as the Wensleydale progressed further up the valley, the shed at Leeming Bar closed. Besides being the mainstay for the Wensleydale line, and some local services to Ripon, Northallerton shed also sent engines to take limestone trains from Wensleydale to the steelworks on Teesside, however, on occasion, the shed sent rescue locomotives to stranded trains on the East Coast Main Line. During the Second World War, the limestone trains were worked by J26, J39 and Q5 engines based at Middlesbrough shed.

An LNER diagram from 1938 shows the depot could only be accessed from the south end of the lower lines. A loop line ran alongside the west edge of the building which connected with the single run-through road of the engine shed; the other road was a dead-end within the shed. Unusually, the coaling and watering facilities, along with the turntable, were located on the high level lines at the northern end of the station; this involved travelling 1-mile (1.6 km) and reversing onto the main line to reach these facilities. During the shed's near 106-year history; the coaling and turning facilities were never moved closer to the shed, however, a water tank with a capacity of 30,000 imperial gallons (140,000 L; 36,000 US gal) was built near the shed in 1913. The location of the 42-foot (13 m) turntable at the station was down to the necessity for the locomotives using the Leeds Northern Railway line to be turned when the link into Northallerton station from the Ripon line was created (1856). The unusual arrangement of the train movements between the coaling and turning facilities meant that both the LNER and British Rail diagrams of the shed and its immediate environs, were spread across two different schematics; the only former North Eastern shed to be treated in this way.

In the 1920s and 1930s, the main function of the shed was to provide one engine for passenger workings to Hawes, and one engine for passenger workings to Ripon. The balance working on the Wensleydale line was undertaken by one of the engines outbased at Leyburn shed; a task previously worked by Hawes Junction engine shed.

From 1950 to 1963, the depot was coded as 51J, as a sub-shed of Darlington. During this time, two of the depots engines were permanently outbased at Leyburn shed, which took over duties for services on the Wensleydale line when Hawes Junction shed closed. Northallerton shed was closed on 4 March 1963, and the building was demolished soon afterwards, with a private business building being built over the site.

== Locomotives ==
During the period of its history, the shed at Northallerton typically had a complement of ten engines, of which six were tank engines. In 1923, the depot had nine locomotives allocated to it, and in 1939 it had seven. During the Second World War, the depot also had one allocation of an NER Class W1, initially No. 690, but this was swapped for loco No. 687 in August 1943. In 1950 it had thirteen locomotives allocated, including classes D20 (of which it typically had four examples), J21s, J25s and G5s. In 1959, the number had dropped to just seven, and by March 1963, when the depot was closed, the tally was still seven. Upon closure, the remaining locomotives were transferred to Darlington shed.

== See also ==
- List of British Railways shed codes
