= Melmerby, Harrogate =

Village and civil parish in North Yorkshire, England

Coordinates: 54.18714°N 1.48431°W

Melmerby
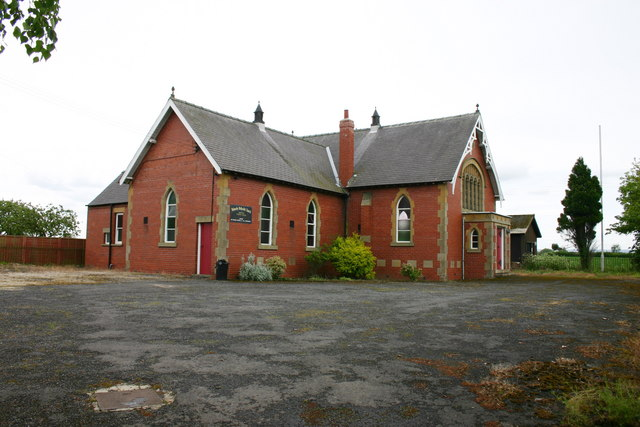
- The Methodist Church in Melmerby

- Location within North Yorkshire
- Population: 386 (2011 census)
- OS grid reference: SE337769
- Civil parish: Melmerby
- Unitary authority: North Yorkshire
- Ceremonial county: North Yorkshire
- Region: Yorkshire and the Humber
- Country: England
- Sovereign state: United Kingdom
- Post town: RIPON
- Postcode district: HG4
- Police: North Yorkshire
- Fire: North Yorkshire
- Ambulance: Yorkshire

Melmerby is a village and civil parish in North Yorkshire, England, that lies 3.7 miles (6 km) north of Ripon and 0.6 miles (1 km) west of the A1(M) motorway. The population was 386 in the 2011 census.

== Etymology ==
The name is of Old Norse origin and means a sandy settlement (malmr "sandy field" and bý "farmstead or village"). The form of the name has been influenced by Melmerby in Coverdale, 16 miles (26 km) west, which has a different origin. Many of the fields in the area have Norse names too, e.g. Halikeld, where 'keld' is an Old Norse word for 'spring'.

== History ==
Melmerby was mentioned in the Domesday Book of 1086. It was historically a manor and chapelry in the parish of Wath in the North Riding of Yorkshire. It became a separate civil parish in 1866.

Until the late 1950s, the village was the site of a major rural railway junction that was situated on the main Harrogate to Northallerton via Ripon railway line (closed 1968). A branch line ran westwards from Melmerby to the small market town of Masham, which is famous for its brewing. This line stopped carrying passengers in 1930 and closed completely in 1963. Another line (closed 1959) also ran north-eastwards linking Melmerby with the East Coast Main Line at Thirsk.

During the war the village was the site of a large munitions store, taking advantage of the railway access.

The parish now shares a grouped parish council, Melmerby and Middleton Quernhow Parish Council, with the neighbouring parish of Middleton Quernhow. The village has a pub, The George and Dragon Inn, a cricket team, the Wath & Melmerby Cricket Club, who play in the Nidderdale League and the village also stages an annual 10-kilometre (6.2 mi) road race which has been held since 1984.

From 1974 to 2023 it was part of the Borough of Harrogate, it is now administered by the unitary North Yorkshire Council.

== See also ==
- Listed buildings in Melmerby, Harrogate
