= St Leonard's Church, Burton Leonard =

English historic church

St Leonard's Church
- St Leonard's Church, Burton Leonard
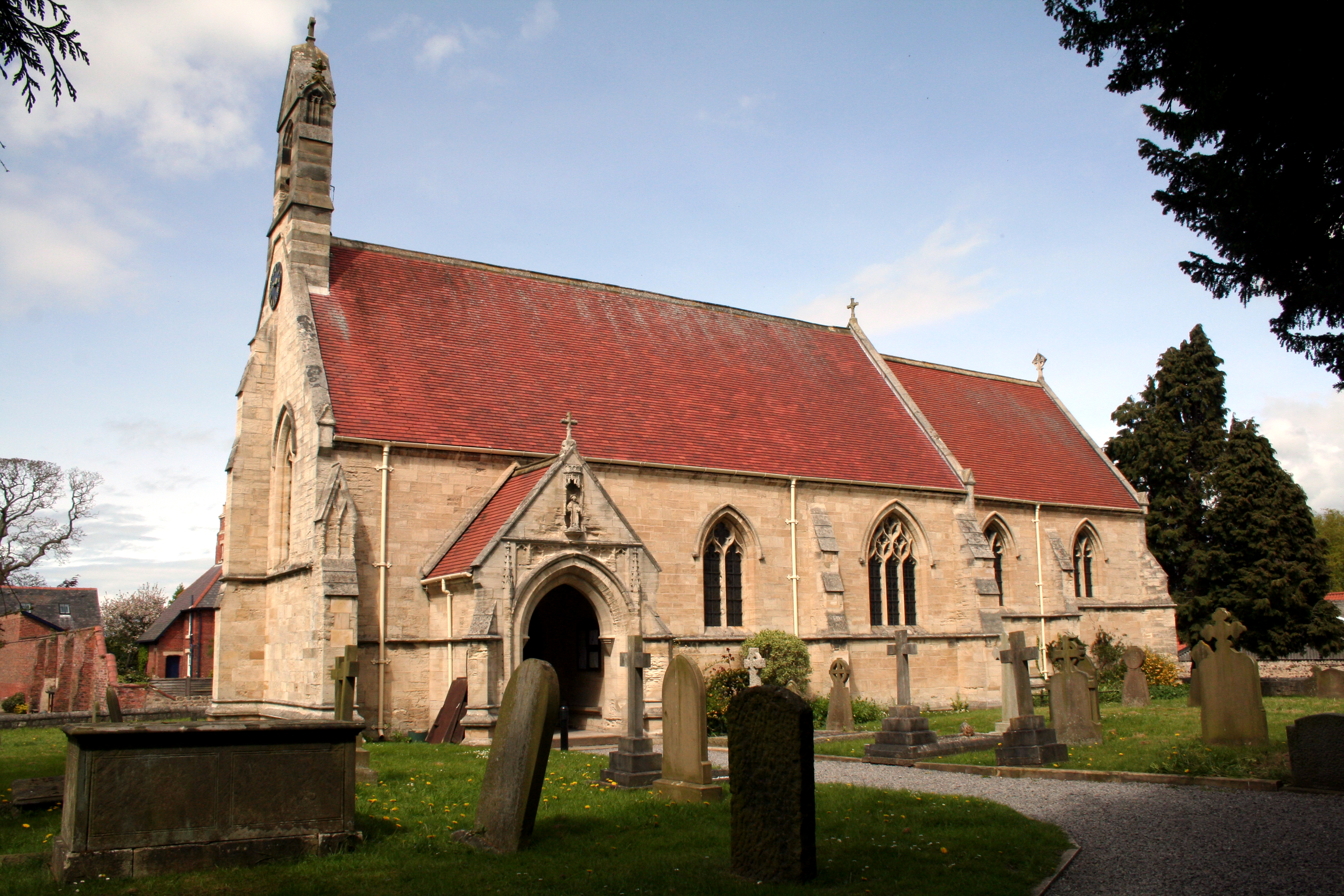
- The church in 2010
- St Leonard's Church
- 54°04′11″N 1°30′02″W
- OS grid reference: SE 32799 63877
- Country: England
- Denomination: Church of England
- Website: www.achurchnearyou.com/church/3187/

History
- Dedication: Leonard of Noblac
- Consecrated: 1878

Architecture
- Architect: Charles Hodgson Fowler
- Style: Gothic
- Years built: 1878

Administration
- Archdiocese: Richmond & Craven
- Diocese: Leeds
- Parish: Burton Leonard

Listed Building – Grade II
- Official name: Church of St Leonard
- Designated: 29 October 1987
- Reference no.: 1365719

St Leonard's Church is the parish church of Burton Leonard, a village in North Yorkshire, in England.

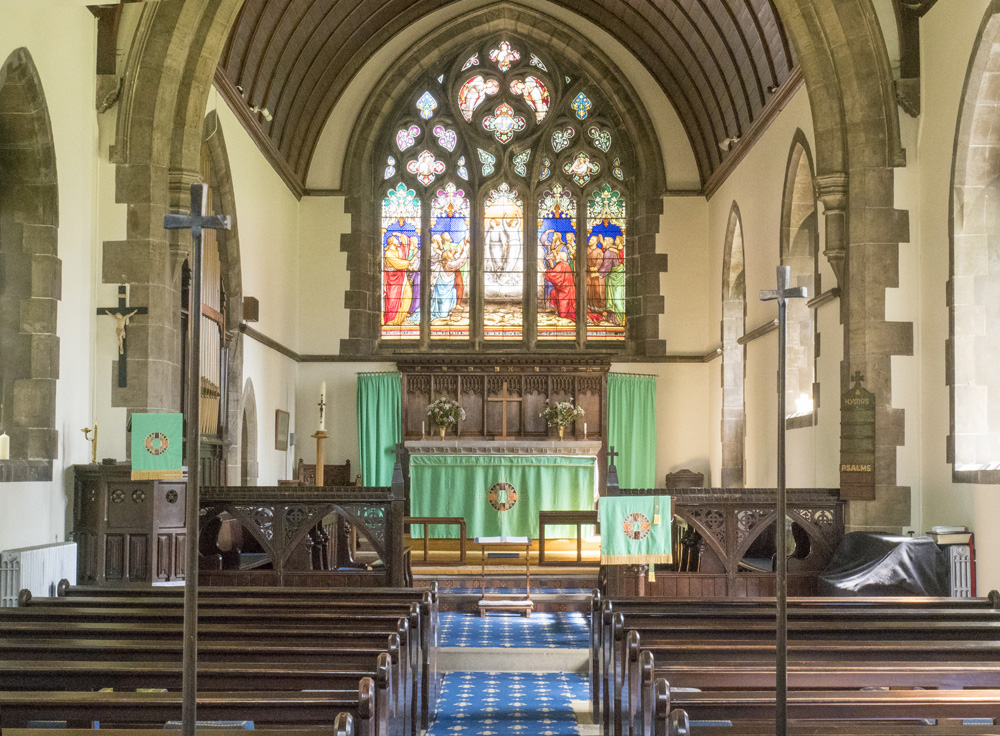
View from the nave into the chancel

The first church in Burton Leonard was constructed in 1242, and it was rebuilt in 1782. It was demolished in 1877, being in poor repair, and considered too small for the village. A new church on the same site was funded by a bequest from James Brown. It was designed by Charles Hodgson Fowler, and was consecrated on 20 November 1878. The church was Grade II listed in 1987.

The church, designed in the Gothic Revival style, is built of magnesian limestone with a red tile roof. It consists of a nave, a south porch and a lower chancel. The nave roof is 30 feet high, and the building is 81 feet long by 21 feet wide. On the west gable is a bellcote with a pediment and a cross. The porch entrance has a double-chamfered surround, and above it is a niche containing a statue. At the west end is a paired two-light window, and the east window has five lights. It depicts the Ascension of Jesus, and was designed by Jean-Baptiste Capronnier.

== See also ==
- Listed buildings in Burton Leonard
