= Newby Wiske railway station =

Disused railway station in North Yorkshire, England

Newby Wiske
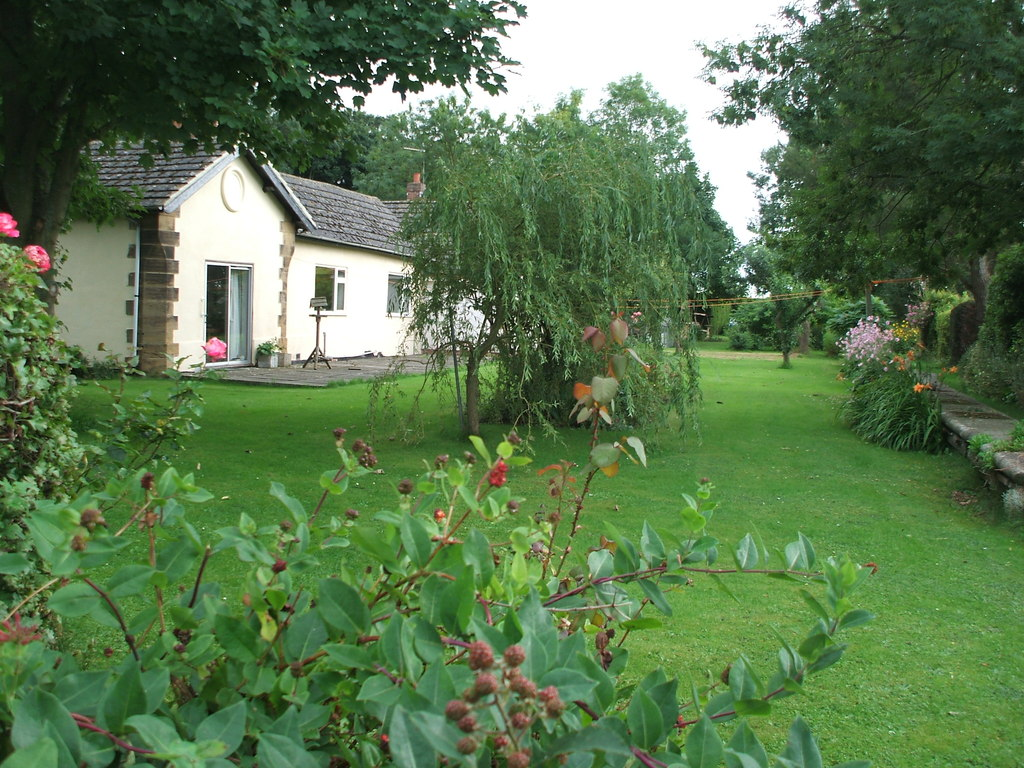
- Site of the station in 2008

General information
- Location: Newby Wiske, North Yorkshire; England
- Coordinates: 54.2896°N 1.4441°W
- Grid reference: SE362883
- Platforms: 2

Other information
- Status: Disused

History
- Original company: Leeds Northern Railway
- Pre-grouping: Leeds Northern Railway; North Eastern Railway
- Post-grouping: LNER

Key dates
- 2 June 1852: Opened
- 20 September 1915: Closed to passengers as a wartime economy measure
- April 1920: Reopened
- 11 September 1939: Last train called at station
- 2 September 1946: Official passenger closure date
- 11 November 1963: Fully closed
Location

Newby Wiske railway station served the village of Newby Wiske, North Yorkshire, England from 1852 to 1963 on the Leeds-Northallerton Railway.

== History ==
The station opened on 2 June 1852 by the Leeds Northern Railway. It was situated on the west side of West View. The station originally had one low platform although this was rebuilt along with a second platform when the line was doubled in 1901. The station had full goods yard facilities on the up side of the line, which was accessed from the south. The layout was changed when the line doubled in 1901 with three sidings, two serving a loading dock and the other serving a coal depot. The main goods traffic at the station was barley, with 428 tonnes (472 tons) being dispatched from it in 1911. Only one wagon of livestock was loaded at the station in 1913. The station was closed due to the First World War on 20 September 1915 but it reopened in April 1920 with only one up train and two down trains. The station was once again closed due to the Second World War on 11 September 1939, although it never reopened. The official date of closure to passengers was on 2 September 1946 and closed to goods traffic on 11 November 1963.

In April 1918, the tender of a steam train travelling between Northallerton and Ripon at 50 miles per hour (80 km/h), came off the rails to the north of the station, but stayed upright and the effect of its derailing caused the train to split in two. The engine driver managed to stop the train on Maunby Bridge (over the River Swale) some 1.9 miles (3 km) after the initial derailment. The rear seven detached carriages tore the line up after the locomotive and came to a rest just before the bridge and narrowly avoided falling down the 20-foot (6.1 m) embankment into the River Swale. A fire broke out in the third carriage caused by a ruptured gas pipe, but it was extinguished by the guard. Of the 160 people aboard the train, only three minor injuries were recorded.

Preceding station	Disused railways	Following station
Northallerton; Line closed, station open	Leeds Northern Railway; Leeds-Northallerton Railway	Pickhill; Line and station closed
