= Pickhill railway station =

Disused railway station in North Yorkshire, England

Pickhill
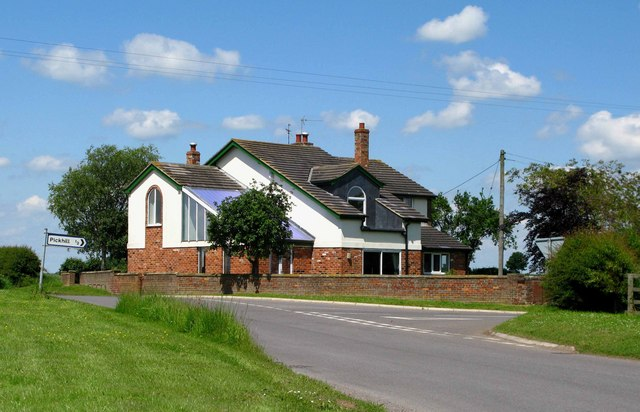
- The converted station building in 2009

General information
- Location: Pickhill, North Yorkshire; England
- Coordinates: 54.2427°N 1.4768°W
- Grid reference: SE341831
- Platforms: 2

Other information
- Status: Disused

History
- Original company: North Eastern Railway
- Pre-grouping: North Eastern Railway
- Post-grouping: LNER; British Railways (North Eastern)

Key dates
- March 1875: Opened
- 14 September 1959: Closed
Location

Pickhill railway station served the village of Pickhill, North Yorkshire, England from 1875 to 1959 on the Leeds-Northallerton Railway.

== History ==
The station opened in March 1875 (the first appearance in the Bradshaw timetable) by the North Eastern Railway. It was situated on the east side of the junction of Cross Lane and an unnamed minor road. Like the preceding station Newby Wiske, the station initially had one low platform, but another was added when the line was doubled in 1901. There were no goods facilities at the station but there was a siding to the north, serving the gravel quarry. The station was closed completely on 14 September 1959. The siding remained in use until 11 November 1963.

Preceding station	Disused railways	Following station
Newby Wiske; Line and station closed	North Eastern Railway; Leeds-Northallerton Railway	Sinderby; Line and station closed
