= Burton Leonard =

Village and civil parish in North Yorkshire, England

Coordinates: 54°04′09″N 1°30′05″W

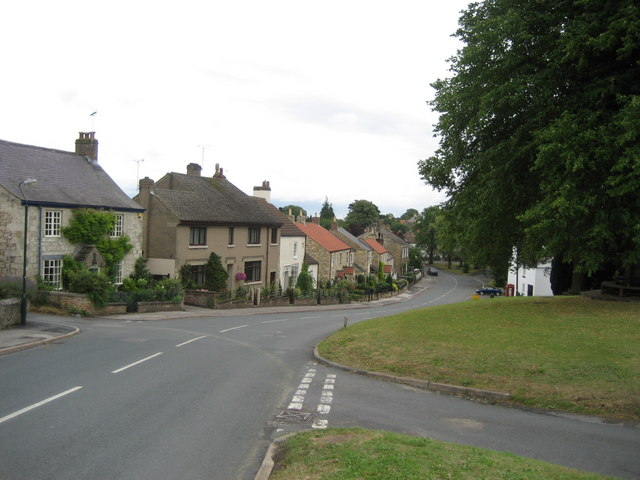

- Location within North Yorkshire
- Population: 690 (2011 census)
- OS grid reference: SE327638
  - London: 185 mi (298 km) SSE
- Civil parish: Burton Leonard
- Unitary authority: North Yorkshire
- Ceremonial county: North Yorkshire
- Region: Yorkshire and the Humber
- Country: England
- Sovereign state: United Kingdom
- Post town: HARROGATE
- Postcode district: HG3
- Police: North Yorkshire
- Fire: North Yorkshire
- Ambulance: Yorkshire

Burton Leonard is a village and civil parish in the county of North Yorkshire, England, and approximately 7 miles (11 km) south from Ripon. In the 2001 Census, the population of the village was 654, which had risen to 690 by the time of the 2011 Census. In 2015, North Yorkshire County Council estimated the population had dropped to 670.

Until 1974 it was part of the West Riding of Yorkshire. From 1974 to 2023 it was part of the Borough of Harrogate, it is now administered by the unitary North Yorkshire Council.

The village is typical of the area, with at its centre a green, one public house, a church, a small primary school, a cricket field and a village shop. Buses run daily from the green to the nearby town of Knaresborough and the City of Ripon.

== History ==
Burton Leonard is mentioned in the Domesday Book of 1086 as having 30 ploughlands and belonging to King William. The name of Burton derives from the Old English of Burh-Tūn (a fortified manor) and the name of Leonard, in this case, the dedication of the local church.

St Leonard's Church, Burton Leonard is a grade II listed structure that was built in 1878, replacing an earlier structure. Although the current dedication is for St Leonard, as was the dedication in the Late Middle Ages, the former church was dedicated to St Helen. The parish was formerly a peculiar, though now it is in the Diocese of Leeds. Burton Leonard Church of England Primary School was rated as "outstanding" by Ofsted in October 2019.

Burton Leonard has just one pub, the Royal Oak, after the Hare and Hounds closed in 2017 and was demolished to make way for new housing.

Station Lane in the village leads westwards to the hamlet of Wormald Green, the site of the nearest railway station. The railway closed in 1962, and now the nearest station is in Knaresborough, 4 miles (6.4 km) to the south. The village has a limited bus service between Ripon and Knaresborough. The A61 road is to the north, and the A1(M) motorway is 5.6 miles (9 km) to the east at Boroughbridge.

The underlying geology of the area is magnesian limestone, from which many of the older buildings in the village are constructed. South of the village is Burton Leonard Lime Quarries SSSI, a 9.9-acre (4-hectare) site which supplied lime and building stone until 1941.

== Notable people ==
- David Nobbs, comedy writer, creator of The Fall and Rise of Reginald Perrin, lived in the village.
