= Listed buildings in Melmerby, Harrogate =

Melmerby is a civil parish in the county of North Yorkshire, England. It contains four listed buildings that are recorded in the National Heritage List for England. All the listed buildings are designated at Grade II, the lowest of the three grades, which is applied to "buildings of national importance and special interest". The parish contains the village of Melmerby and the surrounding countryside, and the listed buildings consist of three houses and a milepost.

== Buildings ==
Name and location	Photograph	Date	Notes
The Grange; 54.18686°N 1.48381°W		17th century	A farmhouse that has been altered, in stone, roughcast on the front, with a pantile roof, hipped on the right, and with stone coping, a shaped kneeler and a ball finial on the left. There are two storeys and five bays. The doorway has a hood mould, the windows on the front are sashes in architraves. In the left return is a square window with a chamfered surround, and a blocked three-light mullioned window is in the gable.
Ivy House; 54.18616°N 1.48597°W	—	Mid to late 18th century	The house is in brown brick, with floor bands, and a pantile roof with shaped kneelers and stone coping. There are two storeys and an attic, and two bays. The doorway has a chamfered quoined surround, and a heavy lintel carved with a keystone. The windows on the lower two floors are sashes in architraves, with gauged brick lintels and keystones, and in the attic are small windows with plain surrounds.
Green End; 54.18472°N 1.48194°W	—	Early 19th century	The house is in sandstone, and has a Westmorland slate roof with stone coping. There are two storeys and three bays. The central doorway has a rectangular fanlight, and pilasters with reeded brackets and rosettes carrying a fluted frieze, and the windows are sashes.
Milepost; 54.18992°N 1.46373°W	—	19th century	The milepost is on the central reservation between the A6055 road and the A1(M) motorway. It is in cast iron with a triangular plan and a sloping top; the rounded head is missing. The top is inscribed "WATH R.D.C.". On the sides are pointing arrows, the left side has the distance to Catterick and the right side to Boroughbridge.
