= Wormald Green railway station =

Disused railway station in North Yorkshire, England

Wormald Green
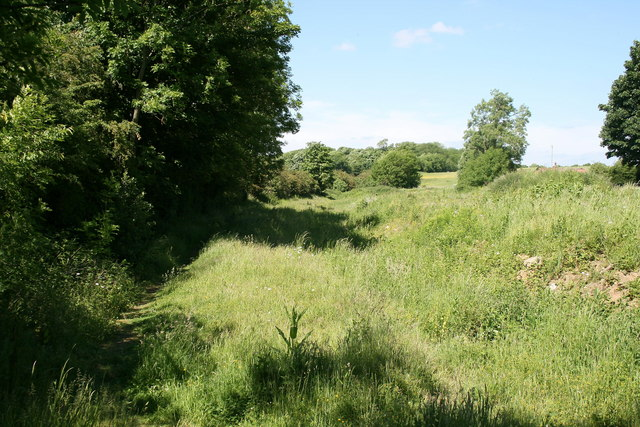
- Site north of the former station (2008)

General information
- Location: Wormald Green, North Yorkshire; England
- Coordinates: 54.078277°N 1.536785°W
- Grid reference: SE304648
- Platforms: 2

Other information
- Status: Disused

History
- Original company: Leeds & Thirsk Railway
- Pre-grouping: Leeds Northern Railway; North Eastern Railway
- Post-grouping: LNER; British Railways (North Eastern)

Key dates
- 1 June 1848: Opened
- 18 June 1962: Closed to passengers
- 31 August 1964: Closed completely
Location

Wormald Green railway station served the village of Wormald Green, North Yorkshire, England, from 1848 to 1964 on the Leeds-Northallerton Railway.

== History ==
The station was opened on 1 June 1848 by the Leeds & Thirsk Railway. The station was situated on the south side of the Wormald Green - Markington Road, just west of its junction with Ripon Road on the A61. There were four sidings, two of which served a coal depot. Pepper's Lime quarry had a private siding. There were more sidings to the north serving Monkton Moor quarries. In 1911, the main freight handled at the station was barley (155 tons) and 128 wagons of livestock. After closure to passengers on 18 June 1962, the station was still open to goods traffic but it was downgraded to an unstaffed public delivery siding until its complete closure on 31 August 1964. The station building has since been extended and re-purposed as private occupation. A cattery has since been built at what was the southern end of the station.

Preceding station	Disused railways	Following station
Ripon; Line and station closed	Leeds Northern Railway; Leeds-Northallerton Railway	Nidd Bridge; Line and station closed
