= Wormald Green =

Village in North Yorkshire, England

Coordinates: 54.0795°N 1.535°W

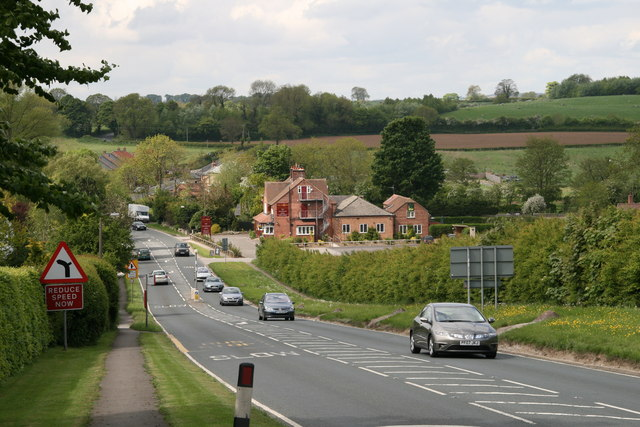
- A61 road passing through Wormald Green

- Location within North Yorkshire
- Population: 136 (2016 estimate)
- Civil parish: Markington with Wallerthwaite
- Unitary authority: North Yorkshire
- Ceremonial county: North Yorkshire
- Region: Yorkshire and the Humber
- Country: England
- Sovereign state: United Kingdom
- Post town: HARROGATE
- Postcode district: HG3
- Dialling code: 01765
- Police: North Yorkshire
- Fire: North Yorkshire
- Ambulance: Yorkshire

Wormald Green is a village in the civil parish of Markington with Wallerthwaite in the county of North Yorkshire, England. It is situated on the A61 road between Harrogate and Ripon which crosses over Markington Beck here.

In 2016, Harrogate Borough Council (HBC) estimated the population of the village to be 136. It was historically part of Claro Wapentake. From 1974 to 2023 it was part of the Borough of Harrogate. It is now administered by the unitary North Yorkshire Council.

== Transport and facilities ==
From 1848 to 1964 the village was served by Wormald Green railway station on the Leeds–Northallerton Railway, although passenger services ceased to operate in 1962. There is a regular bus service provided by Harrogate Bus (route 36) along the A61 road linking Leeds with Ripon via Harrogate and serving Wormald Green. Buses ply the route on average of three per hour (every 20 minutes) rising to four per hour between 11:00 am and 4:00 pm.

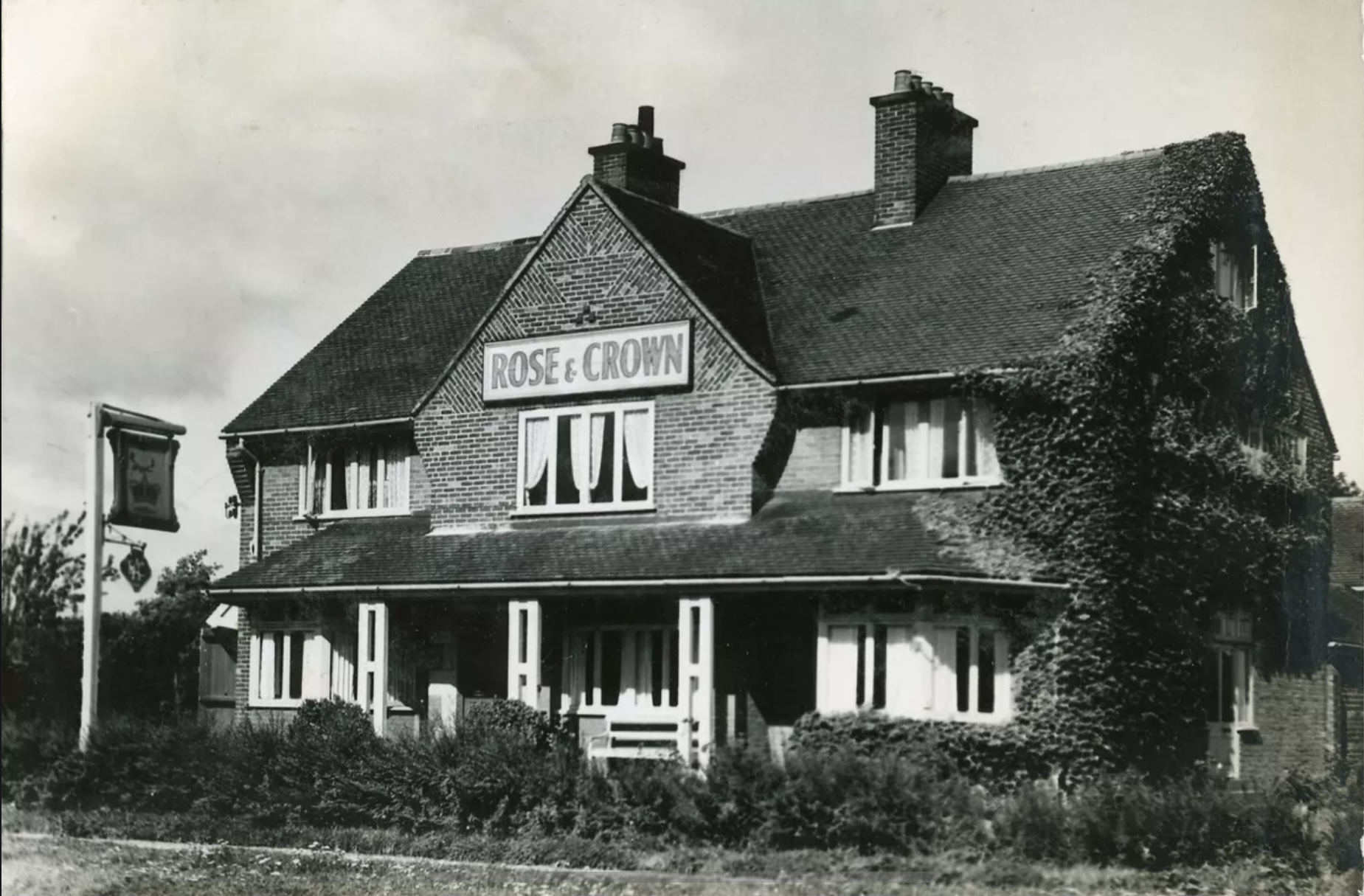
The Rose and Crown at Wormald Green

There is a hotel east of the bridge across the stream. Currently trading as The George Carvery and Hotel, this building dates back to the early 20th century.
