= Topcliffe railway station =

Disused railway station in North Yorkshire, England

Topcliffe
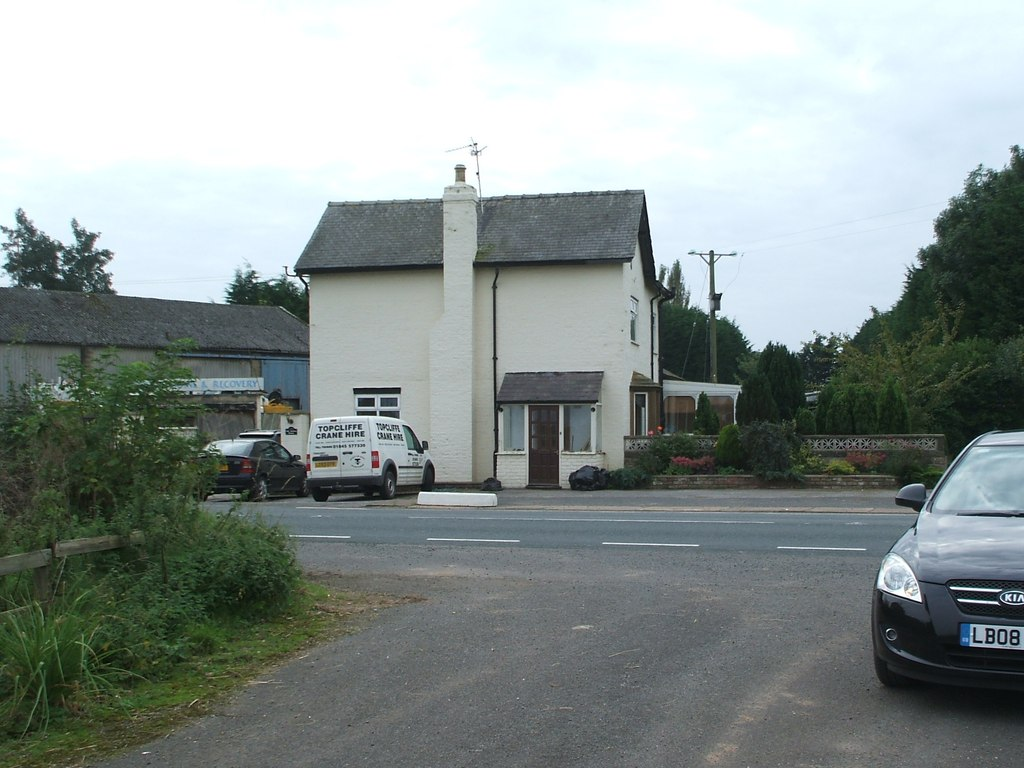
- Site of the former station (2008)

General information
- Location: Topcliffe, North Yorkshire; England
- Coordinates: 54.2081°N 1.4148°W
- Grid reference: SE382793
- Platforms: 2

Other information
- Status: Disused

History
- Original company: Leeds and Thirsk Railway
- Pre-grouping: North Eastern Railway
- Post-grouping: LNER; British Railways (North Eastern)

Key dates
- 1 June 1848: Opened
- July 1854: Name changed to Topcliffe Gate
- April 1863: Name reverted to Topcliffe
- 14 September 1959: Closed
Location

Topcliffe railway station served the village of Topcliffe, North Yorkshire, England from 1848 to 1959 on the Leeds and Thirsk Railway.

== History ==
The station opened on 1 June 1848 by the Leeds and Thirsk Railway, and was some 5 3/4 miles (9.3 km) east of Ripon and 2 1/2 miles (4.0 km) west of Thirsk Town railway station. The station was situated on the A167 road (which at the time was the Boroughbridge and Durham Turnpike), and was some 2 1/4 miles (3.6 km) to the north of Topcliffe village. The station's name was changed to Topcliffe Gate in July 1854 but it was reverted to Topcliffe in April 1863. The goods yard was located on the up side behind the station platform and consisted of three sidings, two of them serving coal drops, and a cattle dock. In 1911, the main freight handled at the station were 237 tonnes (261 tons) of potatoes and 253 tonnes (279 tons) of barley. Passenger tickets issued at the station amounted to 3,866 in 1885, 3,161 in 1900, 2,634 in 1911 and 2,751 in 1914.

In 1901, the direct line between Melmerby and Northallerton avoiding Topcliffe and Thirsk was doubled, having previously being only a single-track line. This gave the newer line greater prominence for railway traffic, with much diverted away from the line through Topcliffe. As the line was reduced in importance post 1901, some rationalisation took effect; in the 1950s, one of the running lines in the station was used for wagon storage, with only one platform in normal use for all passenger traffic.

One of the biggest traffics at Topcliffe was the inward movement of grain and corn for Topcliffe Mill. This traffic ceased in 1959, and the station closed to both passengers and goods traffic on 14 September of the same year.

== Services ==
In 1850, two years after opening, services on the line between Leeds and Thirsk amounted to five services each way, but only two trains stopped at Topcliffe in either direction (all being either morning or evening peak services). By 1877, seven services were using the route with five of these stopping for passengers at Topcliffe, and by 1888, seven services were stopping at Topcliffe.

In 1910, nine years after the mainline services were redirected via the line through Sinderby to Northallerton, services were down to seven along the whole line, with just three stopping at Topcliffe. In 1939, the service pattern was the same as in 1910, just three stopping trains per day.

Preceding station	Disused railways	Following station
Baldersby; Line and station closed	Leeds and Thirsk Railway	Thirsk Town; Line and station closed
Baldersby; Line and station closed	Leeds and Thirsk Railway	Thirsk; Line closed, station open
