= North Northallerton Bridge =

Road bridge in North Yorkshire, England

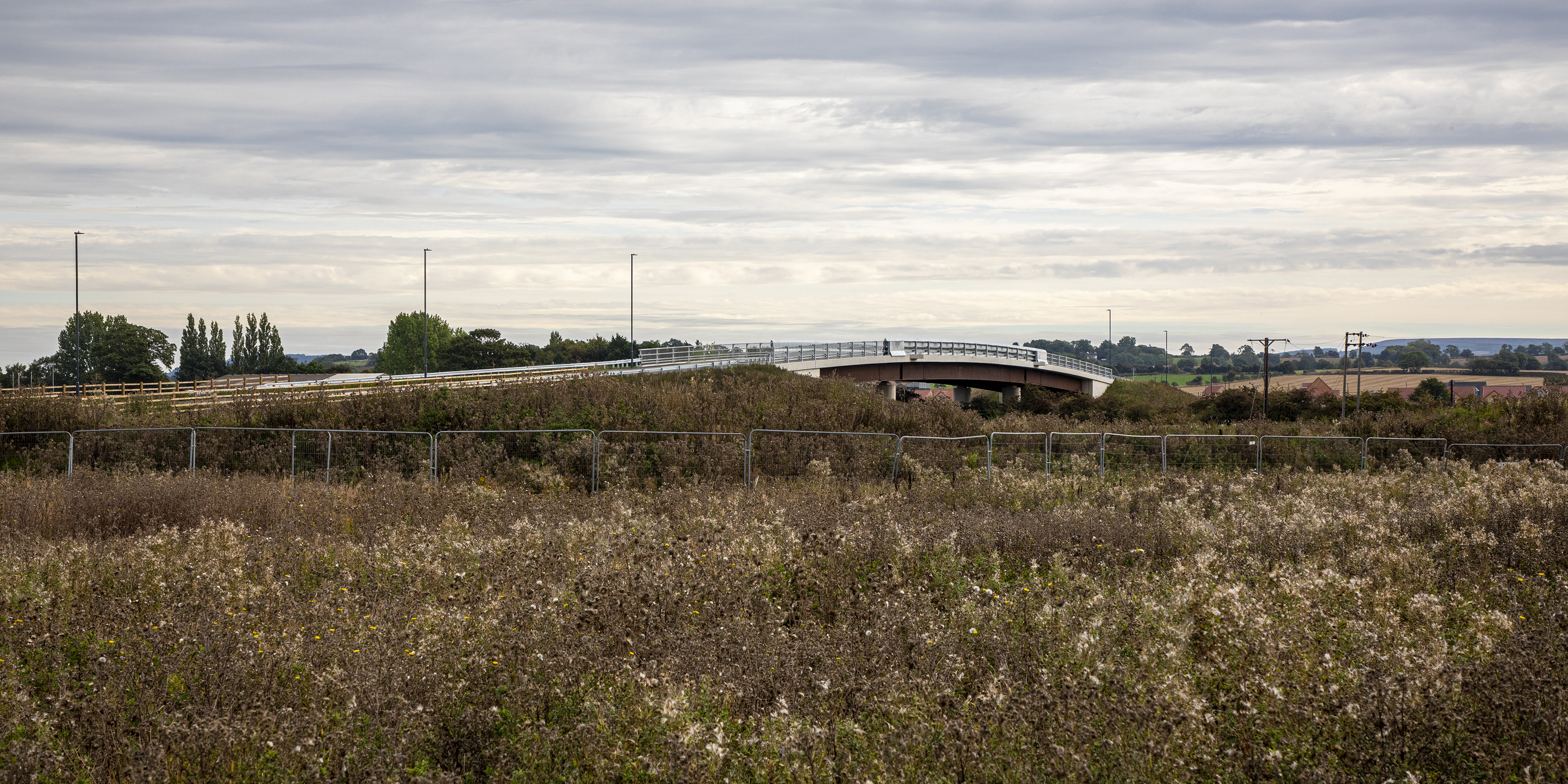
- North Northallerton Bridge from the west
- Coordinates: 54.351°N 1.435°W
- OS grid reference: SE367953
- Crosses: Northallerton–Eaglescliffe railway line Brompton Beck
- Locale: Northallerton, North Yorkshire, England
- Other name(s): North Beck bridge Northallerton link bridge

Characteristics
- Material: Weathered steel
- Total length: 150 metres (490 ft)
- No. of spans: 3

History
- Construction start: July 2020
- Construction cost: £7.6 million (2022)
- Opening: 16 December 2022

Location
- Interactive map of North Northallerton Bridge

North Northallerton Bridge is a road bridge straddling the Northallerton–Eaglescliffe railway line in Northallerton, North Yorkshire, England. The bridge is on a link road connecting the A167 in the west, and the A684 in the east and in part, is intended to provide relief for the congestion caused in Northallerton because of the many level crossings which hold up road traffic. The link road runs through new housing estates between Northallerton and Brompton, and has been beset by delays, originally intended for opening in late 2021, it was opened on 16 December 2022.

== History ==
Approval for the bridge was granted in 2015, though objections to the whole project, including two housing estates, saw a delay in final approvals until 2016. Work was due to start in April 2017, with an original opening date of 2019. Work only started in July 2020 with a revised opening in late 2021. The bridge and link road were approved to provide relief from congestion in Northallerton town as a result of level crossings on the railway lines in the town that cause traffic tailbacks, especially at Low Gates, a crossing guarding the A167 to Darlington. The bridge is part of a link road through two housing estates of 900 dwellings developed by Persimmon and Taylor-Wimpey. The housing estates are separated by a railway line and a stream. The decision to locate the bridge at the point where the stream and the railway are adjacent was taken have a shorter span to lower the cost.

The bridge straddles the Northallerton to Eaglescliffe railway line and Brompton Beck/North Beck, (Note: Brompton Beck changes its name to North Beck near to the bridge. It later becomes Willow Beck, flowing through Northallerton and entering into the River Wiske.) and provides a link between the A167 to Darlington (Darlington Road), and the A684 (Stokesley Road) to the A19 trunk road. Its construction was beset by delays during the COVID-19 pandemic and because an incorrect membrane had been laid under tarmac, which was ripped up and started again.

The bridge was opened on 16 December 2022.

== Details ==
The three-span bridge is 150 metres (490 ft) long and 12 metres (39 ft) above ground level with 25-metre (82 ft) deep piles. The steel beams of the bridge are 100 metres (330 ft) long and weigh 350 tonnes (390 tons) each. With preparatory works completed, the bridge was lowered into position in September 2021. The cost of the link road which stretches for 900 metres (3,000 ft), is £12 million of which £7.6 million was the cost of the bridge.
