= Melmerby railway station =

Disused railway station in North Yorkshire, England

Melmerby

General information
- Location: Melmerby, North Yorkshire; England
- Coordinates: 54.186248°N 1.494878°W
- Grid reference: SE330768
- Platforms: 4

Other information
- Status: Disused

History
- Original company: Leeds and Thirsk Railway
- Pre-grouping: North Eastern Railway
- Post-grouping: London and North Eastern Railway; British Railways

Key dates
- 1 June 1848: Opened as Wath
- February 1852: Renamed Melmerby
- 6 March 1967: Station closed
Location

Melmerby railway station was a railway station and junction in North Yorkshire, England. It had one main line going south to Ripon and Harrogate and one main line north to Northallerton with one lesser line going east to Thirsk Town and also connecting with the East Coast Main Line at Thirsk railway station. Its one other line was a branch to Masham.

== History ==
The station was opened to traffic in June 1848 when the line to Ripon opened up southwards from Thirsk Town. At the opening of the station it was known as Wath, but this was changed in February 1852 to Melmerby. The station lay equidistant between the two villages from where it was named after. Last to open was the branch to Masham which was formally inaugurated on the 9 June 1875. The Masham Branch shared platforms with the Northallerton line and there was one large V-shaped island platform between the Northallerton and Thirsk lines.

In 1901 the line to Northallerton was doubled and given a connection to the main line at Northallerton station (rather than access being limited to the Stockton line). This switched the importance of the Northallerton and Thirsk lines around with heavy and important traffic going on the Northallerton line and the route to Thirsk being downgraded into a secondary line, although it retained a healthier local service because of a larger population along the route.

The Masham branch was the first to lose its passengers. Officially, the closure date was New Year's Day 1931, which means that traffic last ran on the last day of 1930, but freight trains still used the branch until November 1963. After the passenger traffic was curtailed on the Masham Branch, the Northallerton bound platform was moved further north so that it was only accessible to trains going to Northallerton.

[This is not completely correct, although it is what is stated on the 'Disused Stations' website as referenced below. In fact while passenger traffic to Masham ceased in December 1930, the OS 25" map of 1928–9 shows that the platform had already been moved, (meaning it was definitely done between 1912, the date of the previous map, and 1929). Indeed, some photos show that it was originally double-sided, serving both the Northallerton and Masham lines, before being demolished by BR and replaced by a small single-sided platform on the main line only. According to Ken Hoole, the platform was moved in 1913 in connection with a redesign related to the closure of one of the two signal boxes at Melmerby. It is possible that at some time somebody was confused by the date of passenger service cessation (1931) and the date of the platform change (1913) and assumed a connection which has been perpetuated].

As the line to Thirsk had been downgraded and traffic moved away, it became the earliest full casualty being closed completely in September 1959.

The line, and all stations between Northallerton and Harrogate, were officially closed on 6 March 1967 as part of the Beeching closures. The line was re-opened temporarily for three days (in July and August 1967) to northbound traffic due to an accident on the East Coast Main Line at Thirsk.

A private dwelling now sits on the site of the station, whilst a haulage depot now occupies the former goods sidings south of the Melmerby to Wath road.

Preceding station	Historical railways	Following station
Ripon; Line and station closed	North Eastern Railway; Leeds-Northallerton Railway	Sinderby; Line and station closed
Ripon; Line and station closed	North Eastern Railway; Leeds & Thirsk Railway	Baldersby; Line and station closed
Terminus	North Eastern Railway; Masham branch	Tanfield; Line and station closed
