= Thirsk Town railway station =

Disused railway station in North Yorkshire, England

Thirsk Town
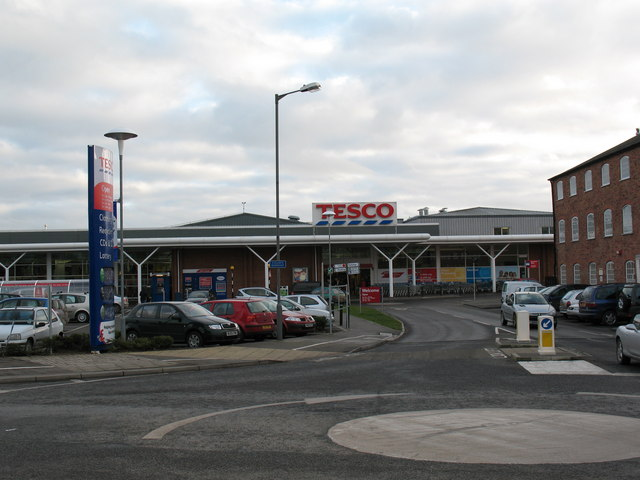
- A Tesco now occupies the site of the station

General information
- Location: Thirsk, North Yorkshire; England
- Coordinates: 54.2308°N 1.3471°W

Other information
- Status: Disused

History
- Original company: Leeds and Thirsk Railway
- Pre-grouping: North Eastern Railway
- Post-grouping: London and North Eastern Railway

Key dates
- 1 June 1848: Opened as Thirsk Town
- June 1852: Renamed Thirsk
- December 1855: Closed to passengers
- 3 October 1966: closed for freight
Location

Thirsk Town was a railway station that briefly served passengers for Thirsk, North Yorkshire, England in the 1840s and 1850s. It was closed to passengers in 1855 but continued in freight use until October 1966. Trains could leave the site only south-eastwards onto the Leeds Northern Railway towards Ripon, but a reversal was possible into Thirsk railway station after crossing the main line between York and Darlington.

== History ==
The station was opened with the line in January 1848 and initially only served freight traffic with passenger trains starting in June of the same year. Passenger trains continued to use the station for seven years until all workings were diverted to serve Thirsk railway station (on the York, Newcastle and Berwick Railway) leaving only freight trains serving Thirsk Town terminus.

The station was part of the Leeds and Thirsk Railway, which became the Leeds Northern Railway and in 1854 amalgamated with other companies to form the North Eastern Railway (NER). The NER was grouped into the London and North Eastern Railway in 1923 and became part of the North Eastern Region of British Rail upon Nationalisation in 1948.

The original Leeds and Thirsk line was closed in 1958 and lifted in 1959. The goods station at Thirsk Town stayed open until October 1966 with trains travelling down to Thirsk Town Junction and then reversing northwards for 1/2 mile (0.8 km) onto the East Coast Main Line and into Thirsk railway station.

The site was used as an agricultural merchants after closure and was renovated into a supermarket, which still occupies the site.

Preceding station	Historical railways	Following station
Topcliffe; Line and station closed	North Eastern Railway; Leeds Northern Railway	Terminus
