= Sinderby railway station =

Disused railway station in North Yorkshire, England

Sinderby
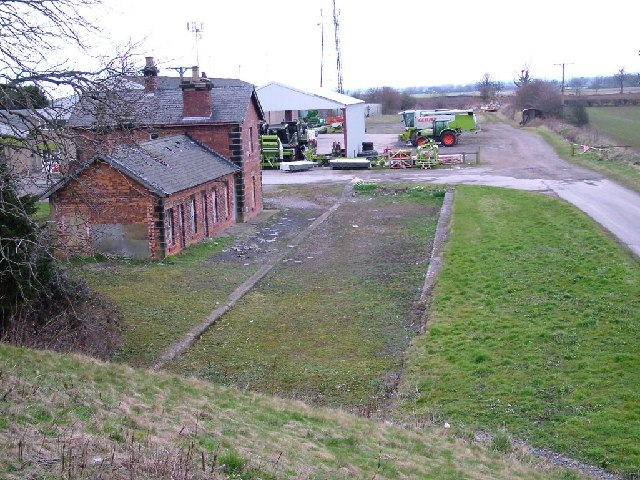
- The station in 2005

General information
- Location: Sinderby, North Yorkshire; England
- Coordinates: 54.225748°N 1.488815°W
- Grid reference: SE334812
- Platforms: 2

Other information
- Status: Disused

History
- Original company: Leeds Northern Railway
- Pre-grouping: North Eastern Railway
- Post-grouping: LNER; British Railways (North Eastern)

Key dates
- 2 June 1852: Opened
- 1 January 1962: Closed to passengers
- 11 November 1963: Closed completely
Location

Sinderby railway station served the village of Sinderby, North Yorkshire, England from 1852 to 1963 on the Leeds-Northallerton Railway.

== History ==
The station opened on 2 June 1852 by the Leeds Northern Railway. The station was situated on the east side of the A1. Like Newby Wiske and Pickhill, the station opened with one platform although it was rebuilt and lengthened while another was built when the line was doubled in 1901. The goods yard was located behind the station buildings with a single set of coal drops. A loading dock was provided on the up side where there was also a cattle dock. The main freight that was handled at the station was barley, with 797 tons being handled in 1911. In 1913, 218 tons of livestock were handled at the station. By 1956 there was only one southbound train at 7:24am. The station was closed to passengers on 1 January 1962 and to goods traffic on 11 November 1963. The station was demolished in 2009 to make room for the widening of the A1(M) road.

Preceding station	Disused railways	Following station
Pickhill; Line and station closed	Leeds Northern Railway; Leeds-Northallerton Railway	Melmerby; Line and station closed
