= Leeds–Northallerton railway =

Railway line in Yorkshire, England

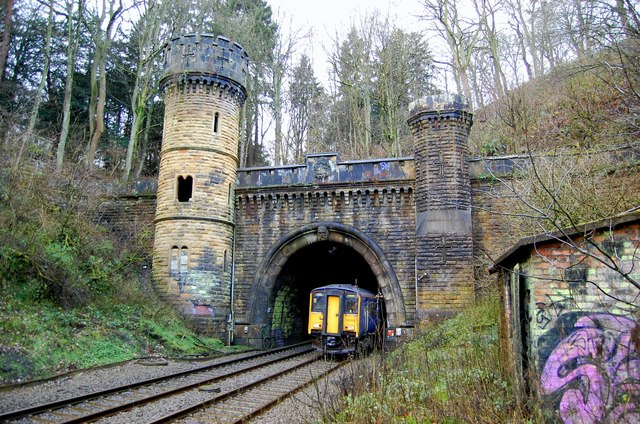
- Bramhope Tunnel

Overview
- Owner: Network Rail
- Locale: West Yorkshire; North Yorkshire; Yorkshire and the Humber
- Stations: 10 (open)

History
- Opened: 1852

Technical
- Track gauge: 1,435 mm (4 ft 8 1/2 in) standard gauge

The Leeds–Northallerton railway is a partly disused railway line between West and North Yorkshire, in northern England.

== History ==
The line was opened by the Leeds Northern Railway, in the 1850s.

The Leeds and Thirsk Railway via Starbeck opened on 9 July 1848. In 1852 as the Leeds Northern Railway the extension to Northallerton and Stockton opened. The line then became part of the North Eastern Railway in the 1854 amalgamation. All three stations at Leeds (Central, Wellington and New) were used at various times.

The section between Leeds and Harrogate is still extant, but its trains now serve a former branch line to York instead of continuing through Ripon to Northallerton.

The line north of Harrogate was closed a few years after the publication of Richard Beeching's The Reshaping of British Railways report. The route was closed to passenger traffic on 6 March 1967, but a limited number of freight trains used the line to Ripon until 1969. It was supposed that closing this stretch of line would have little impact, since passengers travelling north could join the East Coast Main Line at York. The stretch was temporarily re-opened as an emergency diversionary route during the Thirsk rail crash.

The closure of the northern section of the line meant an end to over 100 years of railway service to the city of Ripon.

== Present ==
In 2005, North Yorkshire County Council commissioned Ove Arup to undertake a feasibility study into the possibility of reopening the closed stretch of line between Harrogate and Ripon.

The city was previously served by Ripon railway station on the Leeds-Northallerton line that ran between Leeds and Northallerton. It was once part of the North Eastern Railway and then LNER.

The Ripon line was closed to passengers on 6 March 1967 and to freight on 5 September 1969 as part of the wider Beeching Axe, despite a vigorous campaign by local campaigners, including the city's MP. Today much of the route of the line through the city is now a relief road and although the former station still stands, it is now surrounded by a new housing development. The issue remains a significant one in local politics and there are movements wanting to restore the line. Reports suggest the reopening of a line between Ripon and Harrogate railway station would be economically viable, costing £40 million and could initially attract 1,200 passengers a day, rising to 2,700. Campaigners call on MPs to restore Ripon railway link.

In October 2015, North Yorkshire County Council included the reopening in its Strategic Transport Prospectus which was submitted to Transport for the North. In February 2016 the County Council included it in its Local Transport Plan, but it is accepted that it is unlikely to happen until after 2030.

The Harrogate to Northallerton line has been identified by Campaign for a Better Transport as a priority 1 candidate for reopening. In 2019, the English Regional Transport Association proposed a re-opened railway between Harrogate and Northallerton would cost £40 million and attract 2,700 passengers per day. These figures were based on a single track railway. Network Rail were supportive of the proposal as it affords them an alternative route south from Northallerton.

== List of stations ==
from Leeds

- Leeds Central (closed)
- Holbeck Low Level (closed)
- Royal Gardens (Note: The book notes that the station opened in June 1857. The Station Closures webpage of the notes that it is last in the timetable in October 1857.)
- Burley Park opened 1988
- Headingley
- Horsforth Woodside (closed)
- Horsforth
- Arthington (closed)
- Weeton
- Pannal
- Hornbeam Park (opened 1992)
- Harrogate: The Harrogate loop was completed in 1862
- Starbeck: The original route via Starbeck opened in 1848
- Nidd Bridge (closed June 1962)
- Wormald Green (closed June 1962)
- Ripon (closed)
- Melmerby (closed)
  - Melmerby was a junction with the original line to Baldersby, Topcliffe and Thirsk (closed 1959)
  - Melmerby was also the junction for the line to Tanfield and Masham (1875–1931 for passengers -1963 for goods)
  - At Melmerby South, there was the junction for a short branch to a Ministry of Supply Ordnance Depot.
- Sinderby (closed 1962)
- Pickhill (closed 1959)
- Newby Wiske (closed 1939)
- Northallerton

== See also ==
- List of closed railway lines in Great Britain
- List of closed railway stations in Britain
