= Ripon railway station =

Disused railway station in North Yorkshire, England

Ripon
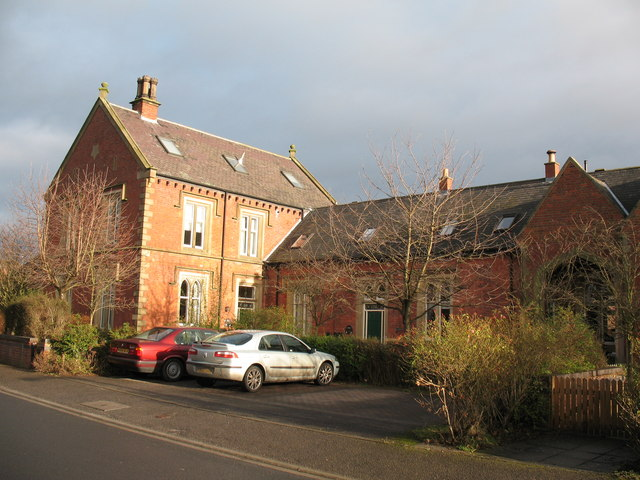
- The remains of the station buildings

General information
- Location: Ripon; England
- Coordinates: 54.145483°N 1.514418°W
- Grid reference: SE 318 723
- Platforms: 2

Other information
- Status: Disused

History
- Original company: Leeds and Thirsk Railway
- Pre-grouping: North Eastern Railway
- Post-grouping: London and North Eastern Railway

Key dates
- 5 January 1848: Opened to goods
- 1 June 1848: Opened to passengers
- 6 March 1967: Closed to passengers
- 5 September 1969: Closed completely
Location

Ripon railway station was a railway station that served Ripon, North Yorkshire, England, on the Leeds-Northallerton Line that ran between Harrogate and Northallerton. The station opened to goods traffic from Thirsk in January 1848, and then to passengers in June of the same year. Passenger workings to the south to Wormald Green and beyond did not start until September 1848. The station closed to passengers in 1967, and then closed completely in 1969.

== History ==
The station was officially opened to passengers by the Leeds and Thirsk Railway on 1 June 1848, though an inaugural service had travelled along the line between Thirsk and Ripon the day before (31 May 1848). Goods traffic had been travelling along the line into Ripon since 5 January 1848. Initially traffic only came from the north; the land south of the River Ure proved difficult terrain to build a railway on, so the station was opened on the north bank of the river as a way to create income from passengers and offset the cost of building the railway. The section south of the station across Ure Viaduct and onto Wormald Green opened in September 1848.

The original Leeds and Thirsk Railway station was largely wooden, and in 1854, a new station was constructed at a cost of £3,840 (equivalent to £368,000 in 2025). The foundation stone for the station buildings was laid on 18 September 1854 by Mrs. A. B. Patience, wife of the station master. The station was located in an area called Ure Bank, 1-mile (1.6 km) north of Ripon city centre.

Ripon station was 11.5 miles (18.5 km) north of Harrogate railway station, and 3 miles 5 chains (4.9 km) south of Melmerby railway station, where the line diverged to Masham, Thirsk and Northallerton. The station had two platforms, with the main building on the down side (northbound), a loading dock, goods shed, timber dock, turntable, and a water column in both the up and down directions. the Railway Clearing House handbook of stations from 1904, states that the station was able to handle general goods, cattle, horses, parcels and passengers, and was equipped with a 5-tonne (5.5-ton) crane.

On 11 August 1866 Prince Edward and Princess Alexandra arrived at the station for a short visit to Studley Royal. They returned the day afterwards to catch the Royal Train to Barnard Castle. The prince and princess returned to Ripon in July 1885 and stayed over again at Studley Royal.

It was taken over by the North Eastern Railway, which became part of the London and North Eastern Railway during the Grouping of 1923. The line then passed on to the Eastern Region of British Railways on nationalisation in 1948. It was closed by the British Railways Board to passenger trains in March 1967, and freight trains in September 1969, as part of the Beeching Axe.

== Proposals for re-opening ==
Today much of the route of the line through the city is a relief road and although the former station is still standing, it is now surrounded by a new housing development and the station building was converted into flats in 1990. The issue remains a significant one in local politics and there are movements wanting to restore the line. Reports suggest the reopening of a line between Ripon and Harrogate railway station would be economically viable, costing £40 million and could initially attract 1,200 passengers a day, rising to 2,700. Campaigners continue to call on MPs to restore the Ripon railway link.

In October 2015, North Yorkshire County Council included the reopening in its Strategic Transport Prospectus which was submitted to Transport for the North. In February 2016 the County Council included it in its Local Transport Plan, but it is accepted that it is unlikely to happen until after 2030.

Preceding station	Historical railways	Following station
Wormald Green	North Eastern Railway; Leeds-Northallerton Railway	Melmerby
