= Hessay railway station =

Railway station in North Yorkshire, England

Hessay
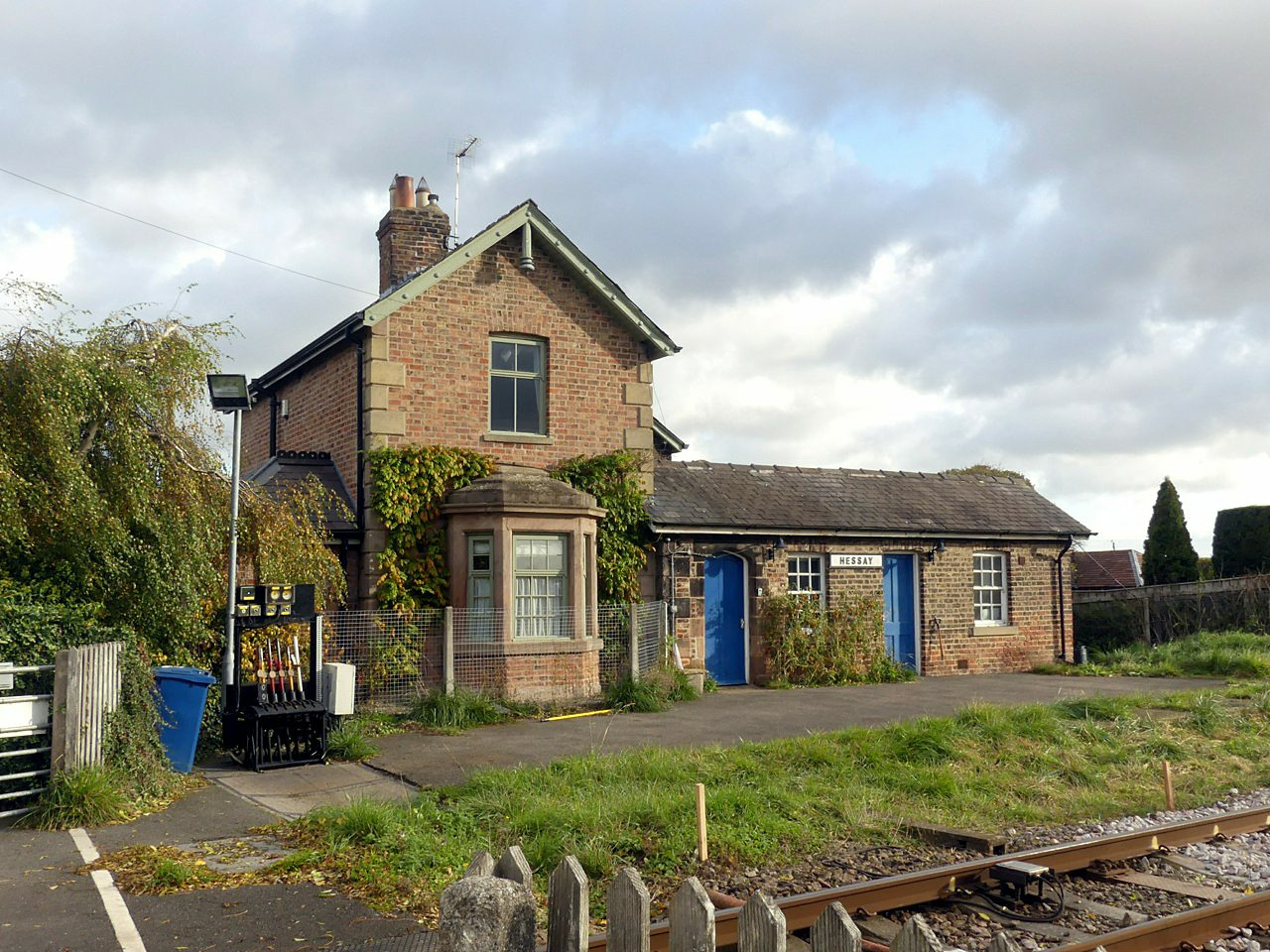
- Former station at Hessay

General information
- Location: Hessay; North Yorkshire; England
- Coordinates: 53.9791°N 1.2008°W
- Grid reference: SE525539
- Line: Harrogate line
- Platforms: 2
- Tracks: 1

Other information
- Status: Closed

History
- Opened: 30 May 1848
- Closed: 5 April 1964
- Original company: York & North Midland Railway
- Pre-grouping: North Eastern Railway
- Post-grouping: London and North Eastern Railway
Location

Hessay railway station was a railway station near to the village of Hessay in North Yorkshire, England. The former station was on what is now the Harrogate line (between York and Leeds via Harrogate). The station opened in 1848, closed in 1915 for some years during the First World War, and then reopened, finally closing to passengers in 1958 and to goods traffic in 1964. The goods sidings to the west of the station were re-used as a Ministry of Defence (MoD) depot until 1991.

== History ==
The line was opened by the East and West Yorkshire Junction Railway in October 1848. Trains stopped to let passengers alight and entrain at what would become Hessay station from 30 October 1848, but an actual station was not built there until 1849. The village of Hessay is about 0.5-mile (0.80 km) south of the station site. In terms of passengers, the station was not very busy in comparison to others on the line; in 1911, Knaresborough issued 192,000 tickets, Goldsborough 4,405, Hopperton (Allerton) 5,900, Cattal 15,000, Hammerton 11,000, Hessay 3,300, Marston Moor 6,200, and Poppleton 17,000.

The station closed to passenger traffic in September 1915 as a wartime economy, but its reopening date is disputed; officially, it was handling passenger traffic again by July 1922, but in July 1919, Bradshaw listed trains stopping only on Sundays. The station was closed permanently to passengers in September 1958 (along with Goldsborough, Hopperton and Marston Moor on the same line) and to goods traffic in May 1964. The line through Hessay was proposed for closure under the Beeching Report, but this was refused by the minister of transport, so as an economy, the line was singled between Poppleton and Hammerton in 1972 and 1973. The one remaining line now passes through the station site on the down side platform (the old Knaresborough-bound line). The station was never furnished with a signal box, even though it had MoD sidings and a refuge siding of varying lengths of wagons, all signalling was controlled from Marston Moor. A North Eastern Railway diagram from 1894 shows the station site having a station frame and a ground frame; the station frame controlled the crossing gates, and the ground frame the access to the sidings which were off the down line (towards Knaresborough).

The few sidings at Hessay grew into a full-scale War Department facility, which saw traffic continue up until 1991, latterly as No. 322 Royal Engineers Park. After the MoD disposed of the site, it became a short-term storage site for vehicles owned by the National Railway Museum.

The site still has a level crossing with manually controlled gates operated by a crossing keeper who uses part of the old station house to work from. The level crossing at Hessay is 5 miles 10 chains (8.2 km) west of York, and 11 miles 44 chains (18.6 km) east of Knaresborough.

== Services ==
The 1887 timetable details five stopping trains each way, whereas the 1910 guide details six stopping trains. Services in July 1922 amounted to four each way only, and in 1938, services amounted to five each way with an additional evening service which could stop at Hessay on request.

Preceding station	Historical railways	Following station
Marston Moor; Line and station open	East and West Yorkshire Junction Railway; Harrogate line	Poppleton; Line open, station closed
