= Headingley railway station =

Railway station in West Yorkshire, England

Headingley
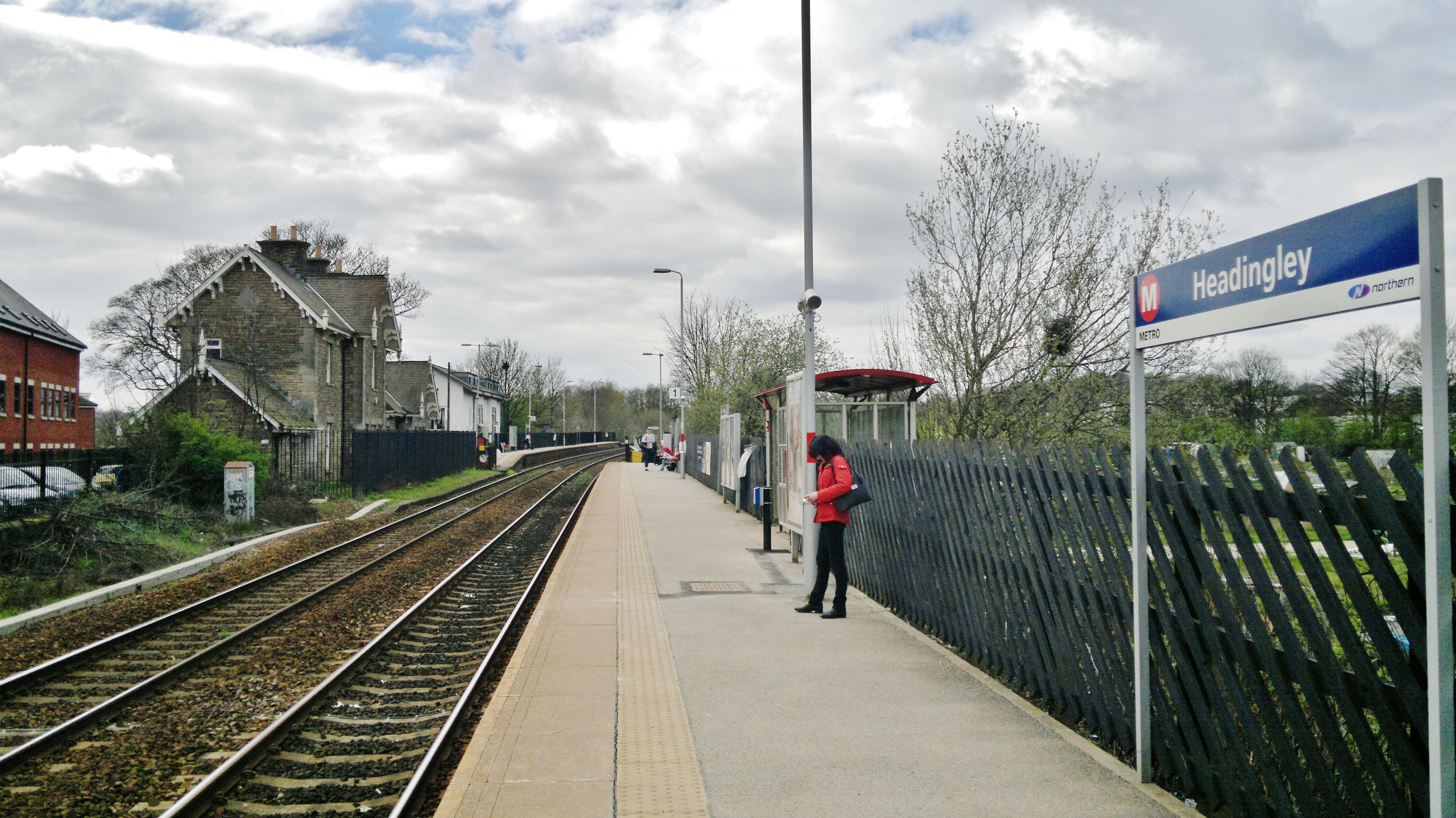
- Platform 1 in 2014

General information
- Location: Headingley, City of Leeds; England
- Coordinates: 53.818°N 1.594°W
- Grid reference: SE268358
- Managed by: Northern
- Transit authority: West Yorkshire (Metro)
- Platforms: 2

Other information
- Station code: HDY
- Fare zone: 2
- Classification: DfT category F1

History
- Opened: 1849

Passengers
- 2020/21: ▼78,892
- 2021/22: ▲0.280 million
- 2022/23: ▲0.300 million
- 2023/24: ▲0.340 million
- 2024/25: ▲0.391 million
Location
Notes
- Passenger statistics from the Office of Rail and Road

Headingley railway station (formerly known as Headingley and Kirkstall railway station until some point early in the 20th century) is off Kirkstall Lane in Leeds, West Yorkshire, England, on the Harrogate Line, 3 miles (5 km) north west of Leeds. The station was opened in 1849 by the Leeds & Thirsk Railway, later part of the Leeds Northern Railway to Northallerton.

== History ==
The station opened in 1849, one year after the opening of the route which now forms the Harrogate Line in 1849 by two of the railways which came to be part of the North Eastern Railway: the Leeds Northern Railway and the East and West Yorkshire Junction Railway. In the early twentieth century houses were built for railway workers by the station on Kirkstall Lane; although now in private ownership these are still existent and marked by plaques.

== Facilities ==
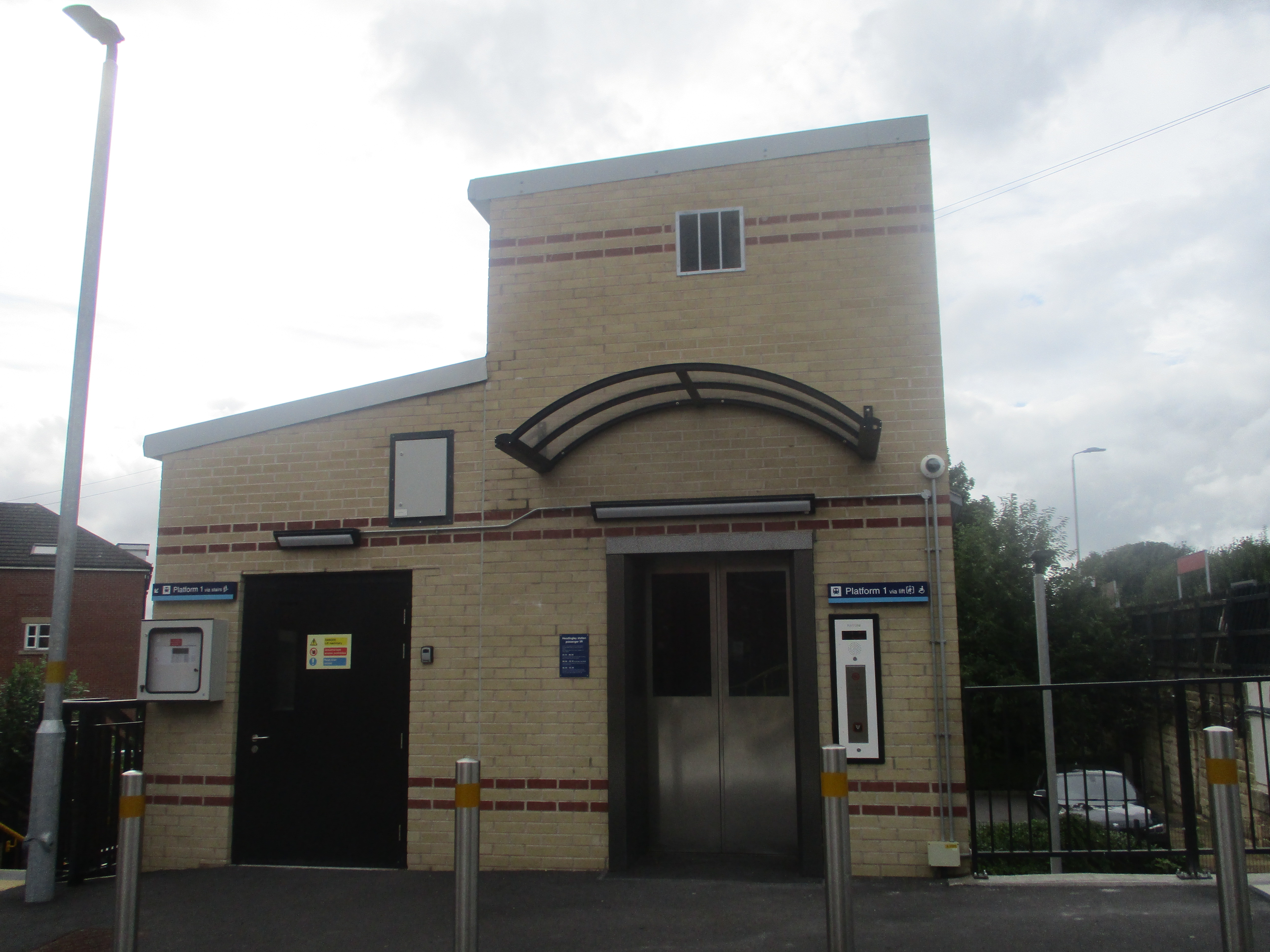
Lift tower on the Harrogate bound platform

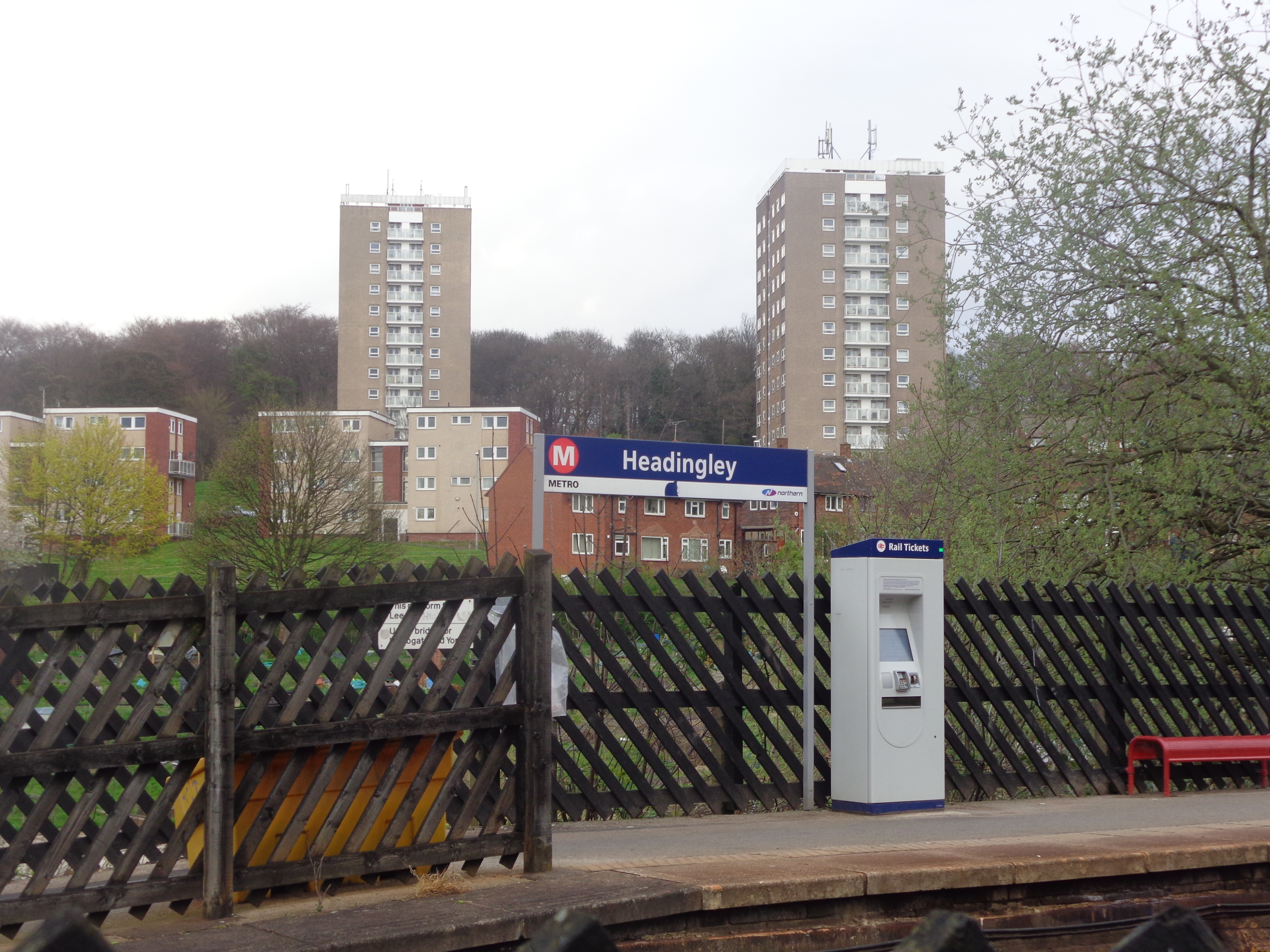
Ticket machine and sign

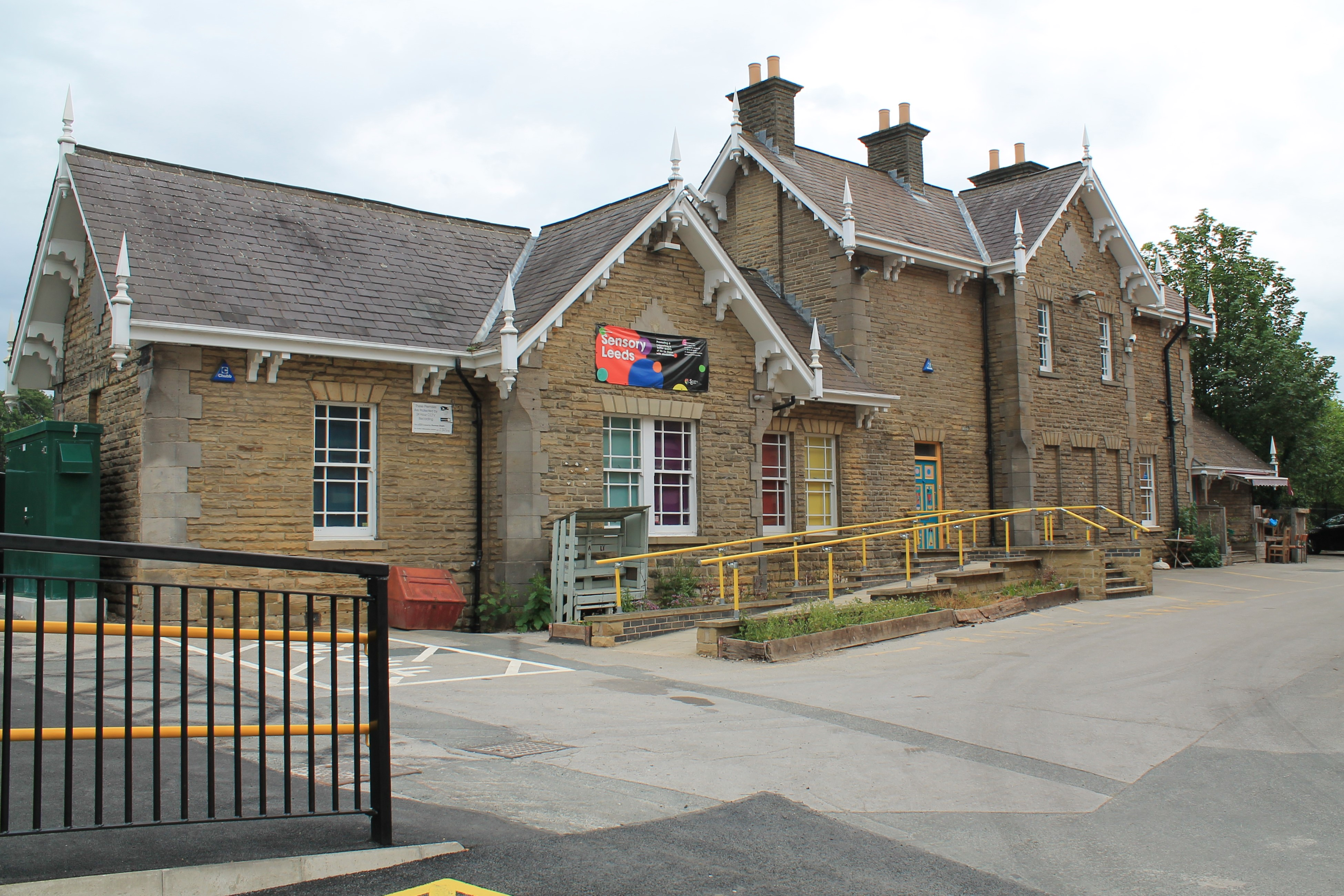
Former station buildings in 2019

The station is not staffed, though ticket vending machines are available on each platform. Passenger information screens were also installed in 2015. There is step free access via the carpark to platform 2 (Harrogate bound), whilst access to platform 1 (Leeds Bound) is available by lifts installed in spring 2019.

The old station building and platform it stands on is no longer in railway use (the building is privately owned) - a replacement platform has been built a few yards further down the line towards Horsforth, giving the station a staggered platform configuration.

== Location and areas served ==
The station is halfway between Headingley centre and Kirkstall, just down the road from the Headingley Stadium's rugby and cricket grounds. It is over half a mile from the centre of Headingley itself, but close to local bus routes on Kirkstall Hill, Kirkstall Road and Kirkstall Lane. It is also close to local shops and services in Kirkstall, including Kirkstall Leisure Centre. The station also serves the West Park and Queenswood Drive areas, which it is linked to by a pedestrian footpath through the Headingley Station allotments. The predominantly student occupied houses between Kirkstall Lane and St. Ann's Drive are also within a short walk. It is the closest railway station to Leeds Beckett University's Beckett Park campus.

== Services ==
Monday to Saturday daytimes, there is generally a half-hourly service southbound to Leeds and a half-hourly service northbound to York via Harrogate/Knaresborough. In peak hours, there are extra services to and from Leeds and Harrogate/Knaresborough.

In the evening there is an hourly service in each direction (with the last two northbound departures terminating at Harrogate).

Services are mostly operated by Class 170 as well as 150, 155 and 158 diesel multiple units.

Daily return expresses between Harrogate and London operated by London North Eastern Railway pass through the station but do not stop.

Buses operate close by on Kirkstall Lane.

=== Former services ===
Prior to the closure of the routes, services ran through the station on the Leeds-Northallerton railway. Services also ran to Otley via the Arthington to Menston Line and some services were also run to Wetherby by way of the Harrogate-Church Fenton line with return to Leeds via the junction at Wetherby with the Cross Gates–Wetherby line.

== Parking ==
The station has a small car park which is free to use for rail users, although no form of proof of travel or ticket is required to be displayed however proof must be produced if asked by an authorised person as detailed on the signs around the car park.

== Future ==
=== Electrification ===
In July 2011, the Harrogate Chamber of Commerce proposed to electrify the line with 750 V DC third rail, using D Stock of the London Underground, to substantially increase capacity. This idea has not been backed by Metro, Northern Rail or National Rail and seems unlikely to garner support given the age of the D stock, the need to adapt the D stock to third rail as it runs with a fourth and the preference for overhead electrification.

== See also ==
- Leeds-Northallerton Railway
- Listed buildings in Leeds (Kirkstall Ward)

Preceding station	National Rail	Following station
Burley Park	Northern; Harrogate Line	Horsforth
