= Knaresborough Hay Park Lane railway station =

Disused railway station in North Yorkshire, England

Knaresborough Hay Park Lane

General information
- Location: Knaresborough, North Yorkshire; England
- Coordinates: 54.0123°N 1.4537°W
- Grid reference: SE359575
- Platforms: 1

Other information
- Status: Disused

History
- Original company: East and West Yorkshire Junction Railway
- Pre-grouping: East and West Yorkshire Junction Railway

Key dates
- 30 October 1848: Opened
- 21 July 1851: Closed
Location

Knaresborough Hay Park Lane railway station was a temporary railway station that served the town of Knaresborough, North Yorkshire, England from 1848 to 1851 on the Harrogate line.

== History ==
The station opened on 30 October 1848 by the East and West Yorkshire Junction Railway. It was situated at the bridge over Park Lane in Knaresborough. The first train to depart the temporary terminus was on 13 July 1848, although the line and station opened on 30 October 1848. The station lasted three years until the Leeds Northern Railway opened the branch from Starbeck to York opened on 21 July 1851. The temporary terminus closed on the same day.

Preceding station	Historical railways	Following station
Goldsborough; Line open, station closed	East and West Yorkshire Junction Railway; Harrogate line	Knaresborough; Line and station open
