= Knaresborough Viaduct =

Railway viaduct in North Yorkshire, England

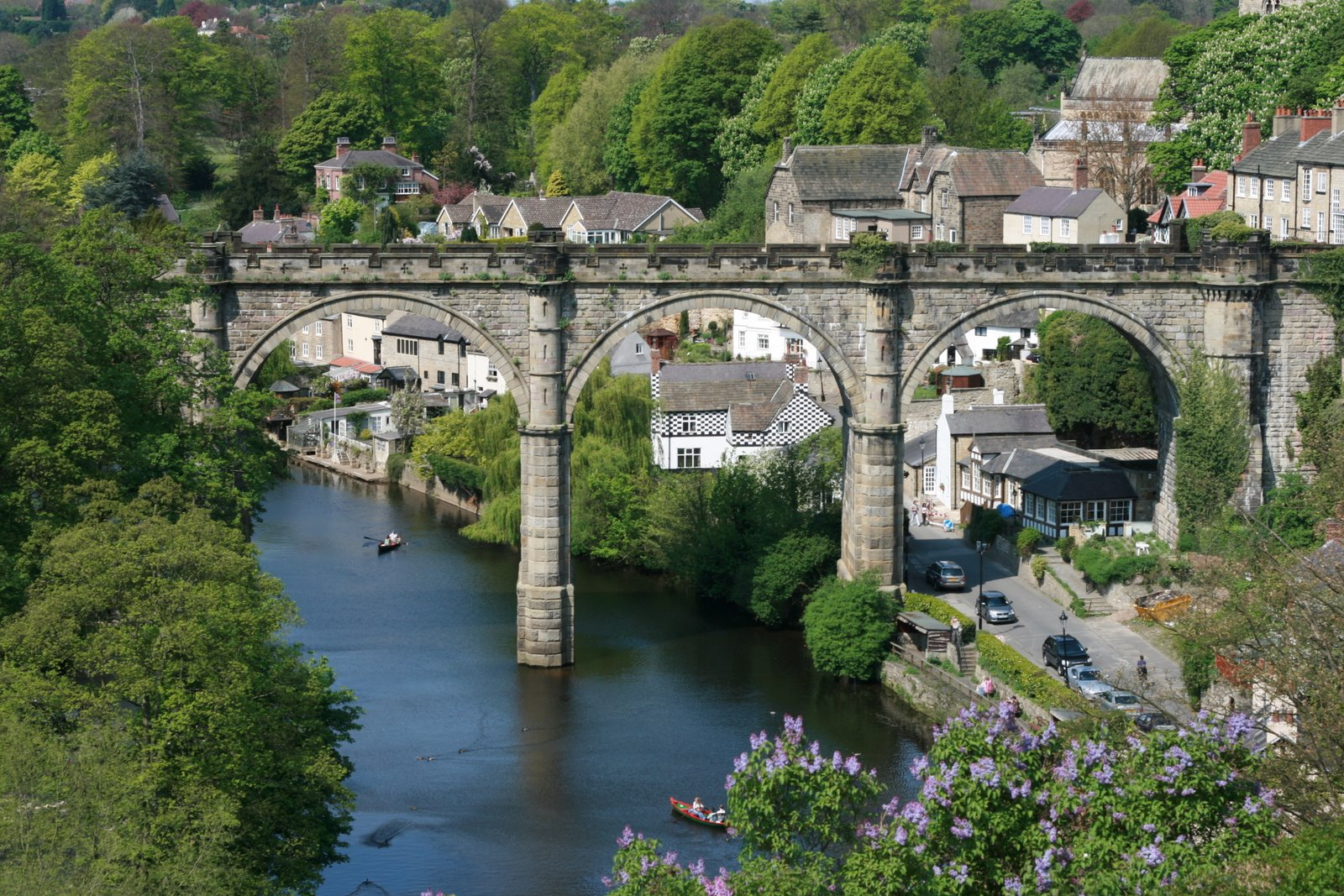
- Knaresborough Viaduct
- Coordinates: 54.0084°N 1.4714°W
- OS grid reference: SE347570
- Carries: Harrogate Line
- Crosses: River Nidd
- Locale: Knaresborough, North Yorkshire
- Other name: Nidd Viaduct (Note: Some sources list this as being Nidd Viaduct (such as Network Rail's own documentation on the viaduct, which also lists it as only having one span). Nidd Viaduct is further upstream and was part of the original Leeds & Thirsk Railway to the north, near to the village of Nidd. This viaduct is still standing and carries the Nidderdale Greenway across it. William Weaver Tomlinson, also states that the "Nidd Viaduct [in Knaresborough] opened on 1 October 1851". To further complicate matters, Nidd Viaduct is also known as Bilton Viaduct.)
- Owner: Network Rail
- ICE: HEW153
- Preceded by: High Bridge (A59 road)
- Followed by: B6163 road bridge

Characteristics
- Material: Gritstone
- Total length: 4 chains (260 ft; 80 m)
- Height: 80.5 feet (24.5 m)
- No. of spans: 4
- Piers in water: 1

Rail characteristics
- No. of tracks: 2
- Track gauge: 4 ft 8 1/2 in (1,435 mm) standard gauge

History
- Architect: Thomas Grainger
- Construction cost: £9,803
- Opened: 1 October 1851

Location
- Interactive map of Knaresborough Viaduct

Knaresborough Viaduct carries the Harrogate line over the River Nidd in Knaresborough, North Yorkshire, England. The railway line was supposed to have opened in 1848, but the first unfinished viaduct collapsed into the river and its replacement delayed the opening of the line through the town by three years.

The viaduct spans the Nidd Gorge about 200 metres north of the ruins of Knaresborough Castle and is a well-known landmark in the town. One writer has stated that it is one of the region's better known landmarks.

== History ==
The viaduct connects Knaresborough with Harrogate on the Harrogate line, in North Yorkshire, England. The line was built in 1848 when the Leeds and Thirsk Railway created a branch from its line at Starbeck railway station to Knaresborough to connect with the line that was being built westwards from York as part of the East and West Yorkshire Junction Railway. When the viaduct was almost completed, it collapsed into the River Nidd on 11 March 1848. The noise of falling masonry was said to have lasted for five minutes. Whilst there was no official inquiry, it is believed that the collapse was caused by bad workmanship, poor materials and excess water in the swollen river below after two months of heavy rain. Despite the collapse, the centre span was still in situ and had to be demolished before work could start again on its replacement. The viaduct collapsed but because of the exertions of the workmen, "a considerable portion of the ruins, about the centre of the structure, were cleared out and the water flowed on comparatively unimpeded."

A temporary railway station was built to the east of the present day Knaresborough railway station while the replacement viaduct was completed and the permanent station was built. A huge amount of stone fell into the river and the presence of lime mortar resulted in thousands of fish dying over a large stretch of the river downstream. The contractors, Wilson and Benson, took the two railway companies to court. Thomas Grainger was engaged as an arbitrator about who should pay for the failed viaduct. He decided that the railway companies should pay over £5,600, but that the contractors must pay £2,389 each and relinquish any further claims on property, materials or the right to build the new viaduct. The main complaint that Benson and Wilson had against Grainger was that he had been employed by both companies to engineer the railway line and stations and was biased.

The replacement viaduct was started in 1848 using the same source of stone; a quarry at Abbey Crags in the Nidd Gorge some 1 mile (1.5 km) to the south. The stone was quarried from the Upper Plompton Grit that was used fot Knaresborough Castle and other buildings in the town.

The replacement viaduct opened on 1 October 1851 at a cost of £9,803. It was constructed with castellated walls and piers to blend in with the ruined walls of the castle. It has four arches and three piers, the middle pier stands in the water. Railway mapping lists the viaduct as being 4 chains (260 ft; 80 m), but other sources list its length to be 330 feet (100 m). The North Eastern Railway Engineer's Line Diagram shows that the length is 5.21 chains, or 104.8 m. The viaduct is 78 feet (24 m) high, and each span is 56.9 feet (17.3 m) in width. (Note: Speight states that the viaduct is 338 feet (103 m) long, 80.5 feet (24.5 m) from water to rail level and that each span is 56 feet 4.5 inches (17.183 m) in width.) The viaduct's height is 35 inches (88 cm)and Network Rail installs temporary fencing to protect workers when maintenance is underway.

The viaduct can be seen from the castle (looking upstream along the River Nidd) attracting accolades, though opinion is divided. In his 1967 survey of the West Riding of Yorkshire, Nikolaus Pevsner stated that the viaduct was "one of the most notable railway crimes in England. To castellate the bridge does not make it a picturesque object". Conversely, noted Yorkshire-born writer, J. B. Priestley, was in admiration of how the river reflected the viaduct and said that it "added a double beauty to the scene". In a 2015 poll conducted by the Dalesman magazine, the viaduct came at number 23 out of the 50 best views in Yorkshire. The viaduct is now a grade II* listed structure.

== See also ==
- Grade II* listed buildings in North Yorkshire (district)
- Listed buildings in Knaresborough
