= Burley Park railway station =

Railway station in West Yorkshire, England

Burley Park
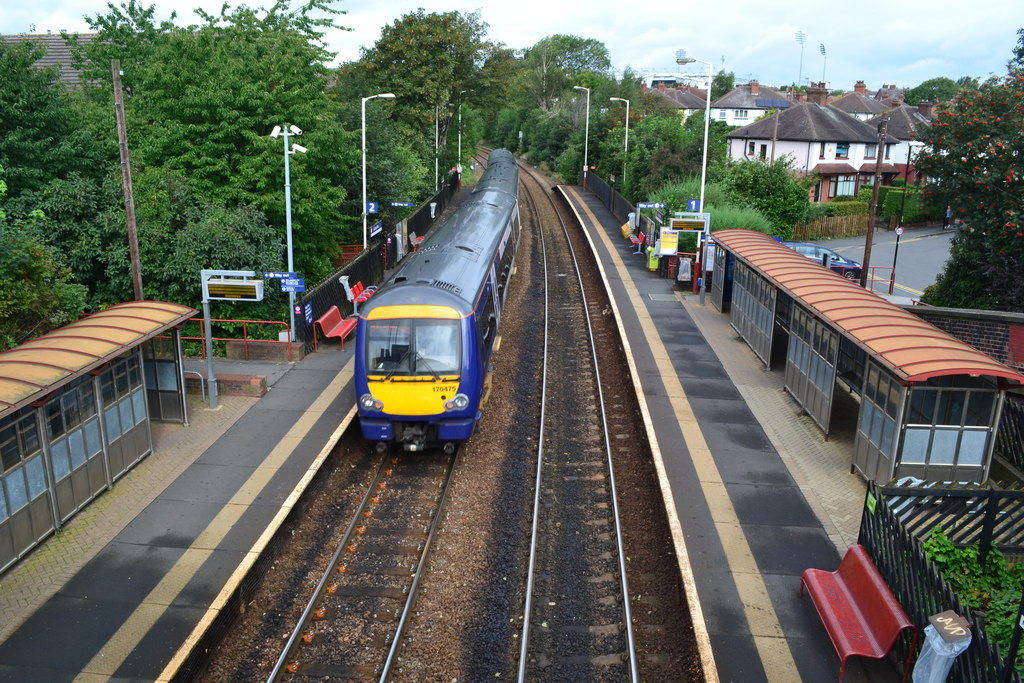
- View of the platforms from Ashville Road

General information
- Location: Burley, City of Leeds; England
- Coordinates: 53.812°N 1.578°W
- Grid reference: SE278351
- Manager: Northern
- Transit authority: West Yorkshire (Metro)
- Platforms: 2

Other information
- Station code: BUY
- Fare zone: 2
- Classification: DfT category F1

History
- Opened: 1988

Passengers
- 2020/21: ▼0.174 million
- 2021/22: ▲0.513 million
- 2022/23: ▲0.569 million
- 2023/24: ▲0.639 million
- 2024/25: ▲0.756 million
Location
Notes
- Passenger statistics from the Office of Rail and Road

Burley Park railway station in Leeds, West Yorkshire, England, is the first stop on the Harrogate line, 2.25 miles (3.6 km) north-west of Leeds railway station towards Harrogate and York. The station was opened on 28 November 1988 by British Rail.

The line is heavily used by commuters into Leeds. It is also near the Headingley Stadium for rugby and cricket fans when Headingley station is busy.

It is near to the districts of Burley, Hyde Park and the southern end of Headingley. The journey time to Headingley station is 2 minutes, and around 5 minutes to Leeds station, which is typically much faster than driving or taking the bus. This station is near to main bus routes on Cardigan Road, Burley Road and Kirkstall Road, and parking is limited to the surrounding streets.

The station occasionally plays the role of Hotten railway station in the TV series Emmerdale.

== History ==
The line between Leeds and Harrogate was built by the Leeds & Thirsk Railway in 1849. A station named Royal Gardens existed on the site of the current station, serving the southern entrance of the Leeds Zoological and Botanical Gardens. This halt closed in 1858 with the zoo.

The new Burley Park station was opened by British Rail on 25 November 1988 as part of a project which also saw the opening of other suburban Leeds stations such as East Garforth and Cottingley.

== Facilities ==
The station is not staffed and has no ticket office. A ticket machine is available on the East side only (direction of Leeds railway station). Revenue protection staff are sent to the station to sell tickets at rush hours and when events are held at Headingley stadium. Shelters and digital information screens are located on each platform and both have step-free access from the street. The station does not operate PERTIS or Promise to Pay machines. Due to the close proximity to Leeds, the station is a Penalty fare station.

== Services ==
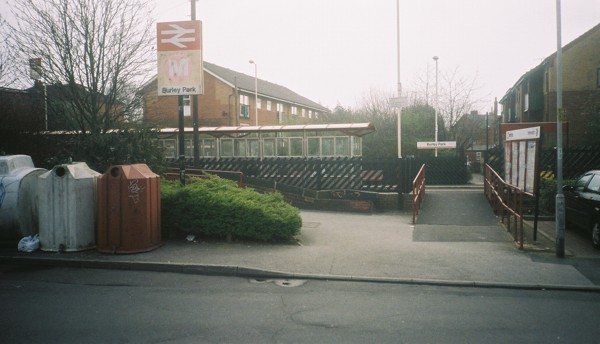
A 2006 view of the entrance from Cardigan Lane

As of the May 2023 timetable change, there is a half-hourly daytime service southbound towards Leeds and northbound towards Harrogate/Knaresborough/York (dropping to hourly in the evening). Due to the number of stops to York it is generally quicker to travel via Leeds when travelling to York, as an express service via Cross Gates and Garforth is then available.

Intercity services, such as LNER's Azuma pass through the station, but do not call at Burley Park.

== The murder of Deborah Wood ==
On 14 January 1996 the body of Deborah Wood was found on an embankment, adjacent to the station, doused in petrol and set alight. Police said the case remains under investigation and a forensic review is ongoing. Her murder remains unsolved. Her case was covered in In the Footsteps of Killers - Series 2: Episode 3 present by Emilia Fox and Dr Graham Hill in which Burley Park station was shown.

Preceding station	National Rail	Following station
Leeds	Northern; Harrogate Line	Headingley
