= Poppleton railway station =

Railway station in North Yorkshire, England

Poppleton
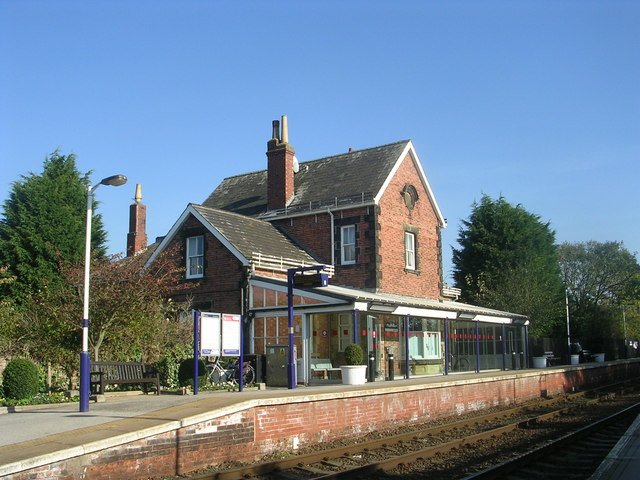

General information
- Location: Upper Poppleton, City of York; England
- Coordinates: 53°58′33″N 1°08′54″W
- Grid reference: SE559536
- Owner: Network Rail
- Manager: Northern Trains
- Platforms: 2
- Tracks: 2

Other information
- Station code: POP
- Classification: DfT category F2

History
- Original company: East and West Yorkshire Junction Railway
- Pre-grouping: North Eastern Railway
- Post-grouping: London and North Eastern Railway; British Rail (North Eastern Region)

Key dates
- 30 October 1848: Opened

Passengers
- 2020/21: ▼14,468
- 2021/22: ▲56,868
- 2022/23: ▲72,144
- 2023/24: ▲89,072
- 2024/25: ▲120,380

Services
Preceding station	Northern	Following station
Hammerton towards Leeds via Harrogate	Harrogate Line	York Terminus
Location
- Location within North Yorkshire
Notes
- Passenger statistics from the Office of Rail and Road

Poppleton is a railway station on the Harrogate Line, which runs between Leeds and York via Harrogate. The station, situated 2 miles 72 chains (4.7 km) west of York, serves the villages of Nether Poppleton and Upper Poppleton, City of York in North Yorkshire, England. It is owned by Network Rail and managed by Northern Trains.

The line is double track between Poppleton and Skelton Junction in York. West of Poppleton, the line is single track as far as Hammerton.

The station has a nursery (horticultural), which used to supply plants across the stations in Yorkshire pre-privatisation. A two-foot gauge railway still operates around the nursery.

In 2022-2023, the destination with the most journeys was York, with 36,554 journeys (50.7% of journeys).

== Facilities ==
The main buildings here are now privately occupied and the station is not staffed. There is a ticket machine located on Platform 1, which can be used to purchase tickets, or to collect pre-purchased tickets. There are shelters and digital information screens on each platform. Step-free access is available to both platforms, which are linked by the manually operated level crossing, which still retains its wooden gates and ground-level signal box.

== Services ==
As of the May 2023 timetable change, the station is served by a half-hourly service between Leeds via Harrogate and York. All services are operated by Northern Trains.

Rolling stock used: Class 150/155/158 Sprinter and Class 170 Turbostar

Preceding station	National Rail	Following station
Hammerton	Northern Trains; Harrogate Line	York
	Historical railways	
Hessay	East and West Yorkshire Junction Railway; Harrogate Line	York
