= Marston Moor railway station =

Disused railway station in North Yorkshire, England

Marston Moor
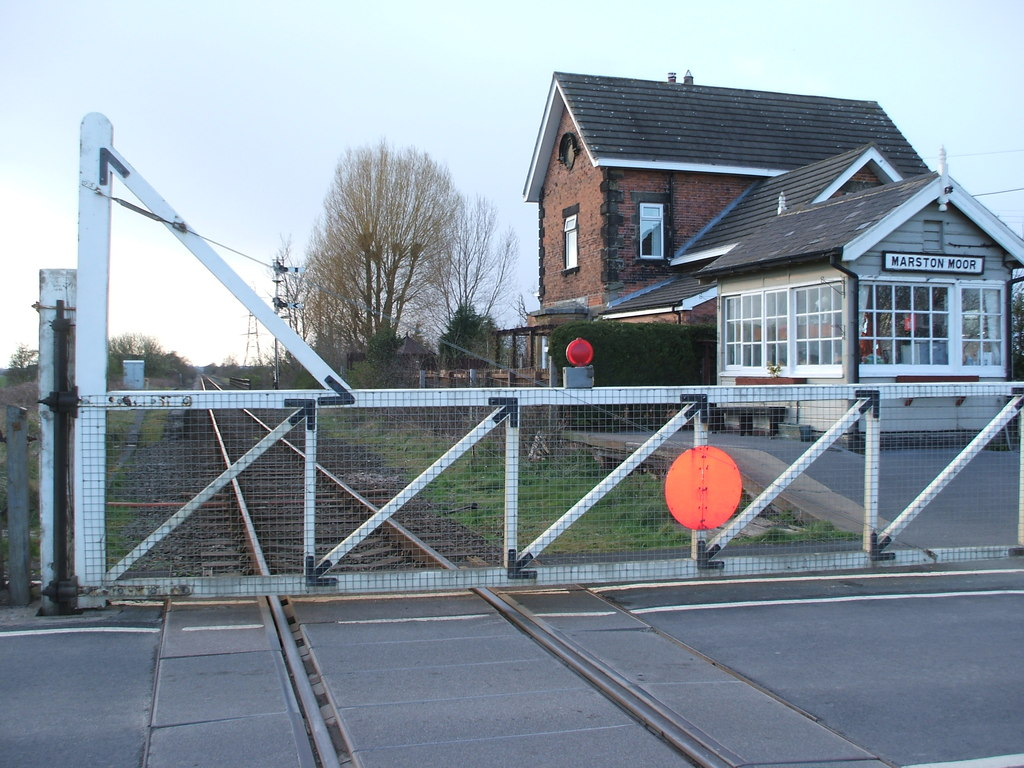
- The site of the station viewed from the level crossing in 2008

General information
- Location: Long Marston, North Yorkshire; England
- Coordinates: 53.9848°N 1.2221°W
- Grid reference: SE511545
- Platforms: 2

Other information
- Status: Disused

History
- Original company: East and West Yorkshire Junction Railway
- Pre-grouping: East and West Yorkshire Junction Railway
- Post-grouping: London and North Eastern Railway British Railways (North Eastern)

Key dates
- 30 October 1848: Opened as Marston
- 1 October 1896: 'Moor' added to the station name
- 15 September 1958: Closed to passengers
- 3 May 1965: Closed to goods traffic
- 1967: Parcel services ceased
Location

Marston Moor railway station served the village of Long Marston, North Yorkshire, England from 1848 to 1967 on the Harrogate line.

== History ==
The station opened as Marston on 30 October 1848 by the East and West Yorkshire Junction Railway. The station was situated west of the level crossing on Marston Lane. It bears the name of the Battle of Marston Moor in 1644. On the Ordnance Survey map of 1850, the station was called 'Marston and Monkston Station', although Monkston was never a part of the official name and the local village was known as Monkton, not Monkston. The station had 'Moor' added to its name on 1 October 1896. Goods facilities were located on both sides and were entered from the west. Behind the south platform was a siding that served a loading dock and a coal depot. North of the running line a short siding backed the York-bound platform with another being a short distance to the west and a long head shunt. In 1913, the goods handled at the station were hay, clover, coal and livestock. The station was not closed during the First World War. Passengers had little opportunity to enjoy DMUs when they were introduced in August 1958, closing a month later to passengers on 15 September 1958. The station closed to goods traffic on 3 May 1965 and parcel services ceased in 1967.

Preceding station	Historical railways	Following station
Hessay; Line open, station closed	East and West Yorkshire Junction Railway; Harrogate line	Wilstrop Siding; Line open, station closed
