= Cattal railway station =

Railway station in North Yorkshire, England

Cattal
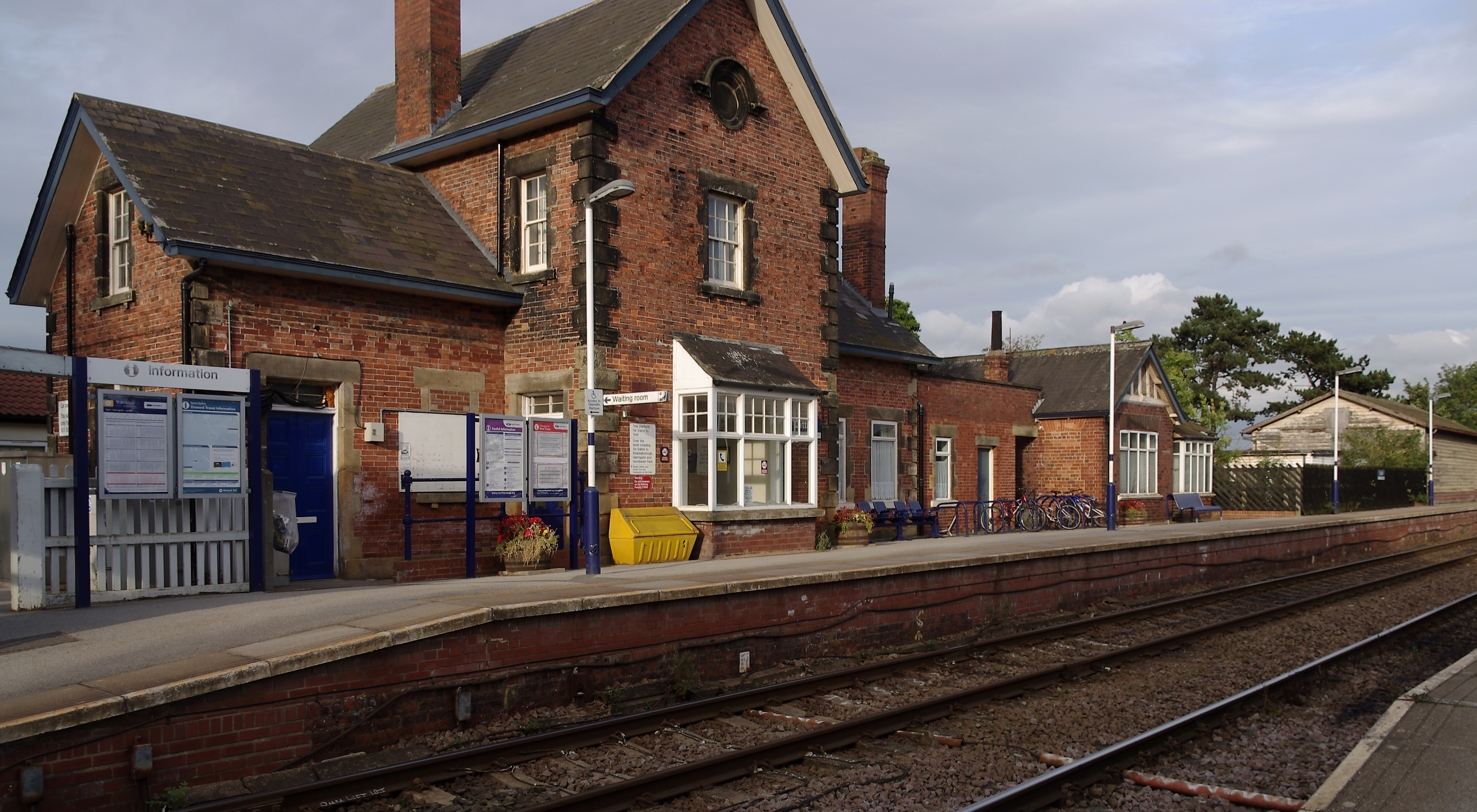

General information
- Location: Cattal, North Yorkshire; England
- Coordinates: 53°59′51″N 1°19′13″W
- Grid reference: SE446559
- Owner: Network Rail
- Manager: Northern Trains
- Platforms: 2
- Tracks: 2

Other information
- Station code: CTL
- Classification: DfT category F2

History
- Original company: East and West Yorkshire Junction Railway
- Pre-grouping: North Eastern Railway
- Post-grouping: London and North Eastern Railway; British Rail (North Eastern)

Key dates
- 30 October 1848: Opened

Passengers
- 2020/21: ▼16,242
- 2021/22: ▲51,422
- 2022/23: ▲64,446
- 2023/24: ▲74,534
- 2024/25: ▲103,416
Location
- Location within North Yorkshire
Notes
- Passenger statistics from the Office of Rail and Road

Cattal is a railway station on the Harrogate Line, which runs between Leeds and York via Harrogate. The station, situated 10 1/2 miles (17 km) west of York, serves the village of Cattal in North Yorkshire, England. It is owned by Network Rail and managed by Northern Trains.

Cattal is at the western end of a dual track section from Hammerton. Trains heading east towards York are timetabled to arrive first on the dual track section, in order to clear the single-track line heading west towards Harrogate. The level crossing here still has manually operated metal gates and a ground-level signal box. The station buildings are now privately owned.

In 2022–2023 the most popular origin/destination station from Cattal was York with 24,076 journeys to/from York (37.4% of all journeys).

== Facilities ==
The station does not have a car park, but cars may be parked along the road but the station has a section of bike stands. Apart from the signaller, the station is unstaffed and all tickets must be purchased using the platform ticket vending machine. Step-free access is available to both platforms via the level crossing, with customer information screens and a long-line public address system for train running information.

== Services ==
As of the May 2023 timetable change, the station is served by a half hourly service to Leeds and York. All services are operated by Northern Trains.

Rolling stock used: Class 150/155/158 Sprinter and Class 170 Turbostar

Preceding station	National Rail	Following station
Knaresborough	Northern Trains; Harrogate Line	Hammerton
	Historical railways	
Hopperton	East and West Yorkshire Junction Railway; Harrogate Line	Hammerton
