= Hopperton railway station =

Disused railway station in North Yorkshire, England

Hopperton
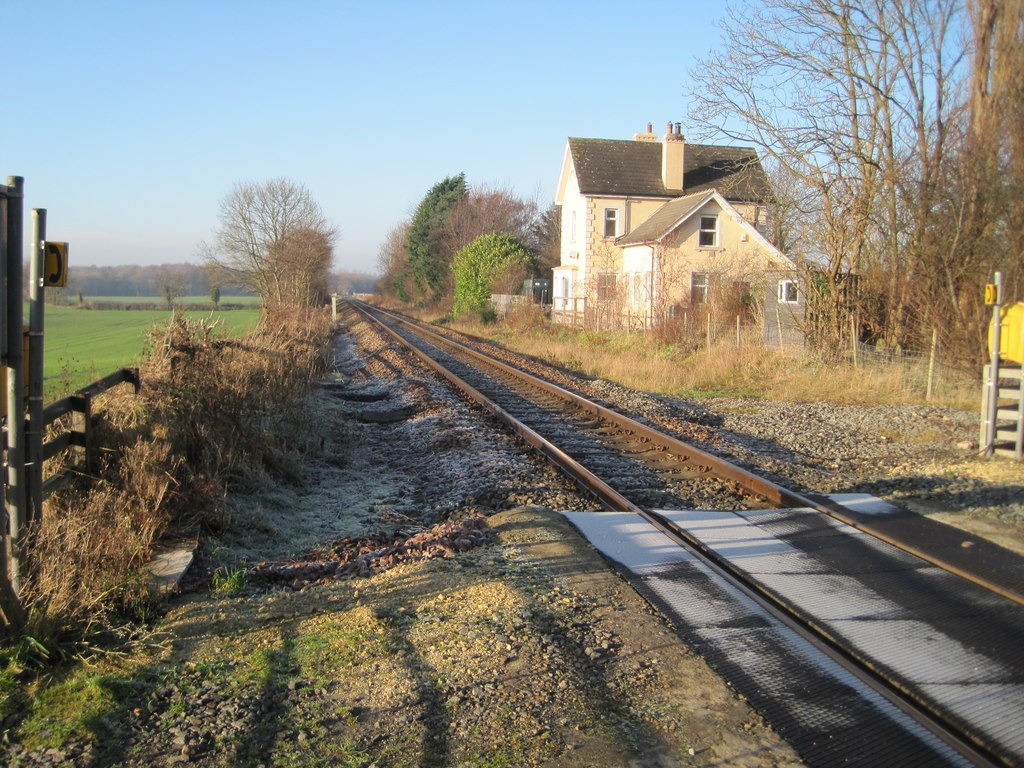
- Site of the former station (2013)

General information
- Location: Hopperton, North Yorkshire; England
- Coordinates: 54.0002°N 1.3698°W
- Grid reference: SE414562
- Platforms: 2

Other information
- Status: Disused

History
- Original company: East and West Yorkshire Junction Railway
- Pre-grouping: East and West Yorkshire Junction Railway
- Post-grouping: LNER; British Railways (North Eastern)

Key dates
- 30 October 1848: Opened as Allerton
- 21 September 1925: Name changed to Hopperton
- 15 September 1958: Closed to passengers
- 5 November 1962: Closed completely
Location

Hopperton railway station served the village of Hopperton, North Yorkshire, England from 1848 to 1962 on the Harrogate line.

== History ==
The station opened on 30 October 1848 as Allerton, under the management of the East and West Yorkshire Junction Railway. The station was situated immediately west of the A1 bridge. Goods facilities were installed on the north side of the main line, featuring a crossing just west of the entrance to the cattle dock. The station included two sidings serving six coal cells, and flag signals controlled movements within the goods yard.

In 1911, census data revealed that the station served a population of 457, and statistics from the North Eastern Railway (NER) showed that only 5,901 tickets were issued that year, in stark contrast to 15,169 tickets at Cattal and 191,752 at Knaresborough. The primary goods traffic at Allerton included 421 tons of barley and 367 tons of potatoes, with 41 wagons of livestock dispatched from the station. Coal was the main inbound commodity received via rail.

To avoid confusion with Allerton station in Liverpool, the station's name was changed to Hopperton on 21 September 1925. For most of its operation, the York-Harrogate line did not have Sunday services. A brief appearance of a Sunday service is noted in the July 1937 Bradshaw timetable, but none of these services called at Hopperton. During World War II, from May 1943, services declined slightly, dropping from seven trains to York and six to Harrogate, to six to York and five to Harrogate, with Sunday services discontinued.

Hopperton station survived the nationalisation of the railways but saw a significant reduction in services by the summer of 1958. The timetable of that period shows only two trains to York and one to York on Saturdays only. The station was one of four on the line to close to passengers on 15 September 1958, the others being Hessay, Marston Moor, and Goldsborough. Finally, Hopperton station closed to goods traffic on 5 November 1962.

On 26 August 2026, there was a near miss between a telehandler and a train at the user-worked crossing at the station site.

Preceding station	Historical railways	Following station
Cattal; Line and station open	East and West Yorkshire Junction Railway; Harrogate line	Goldsborough; Line open, station closed
