= Hammerton railway station =

Railway station in North Yorkshire, England

Hammerton
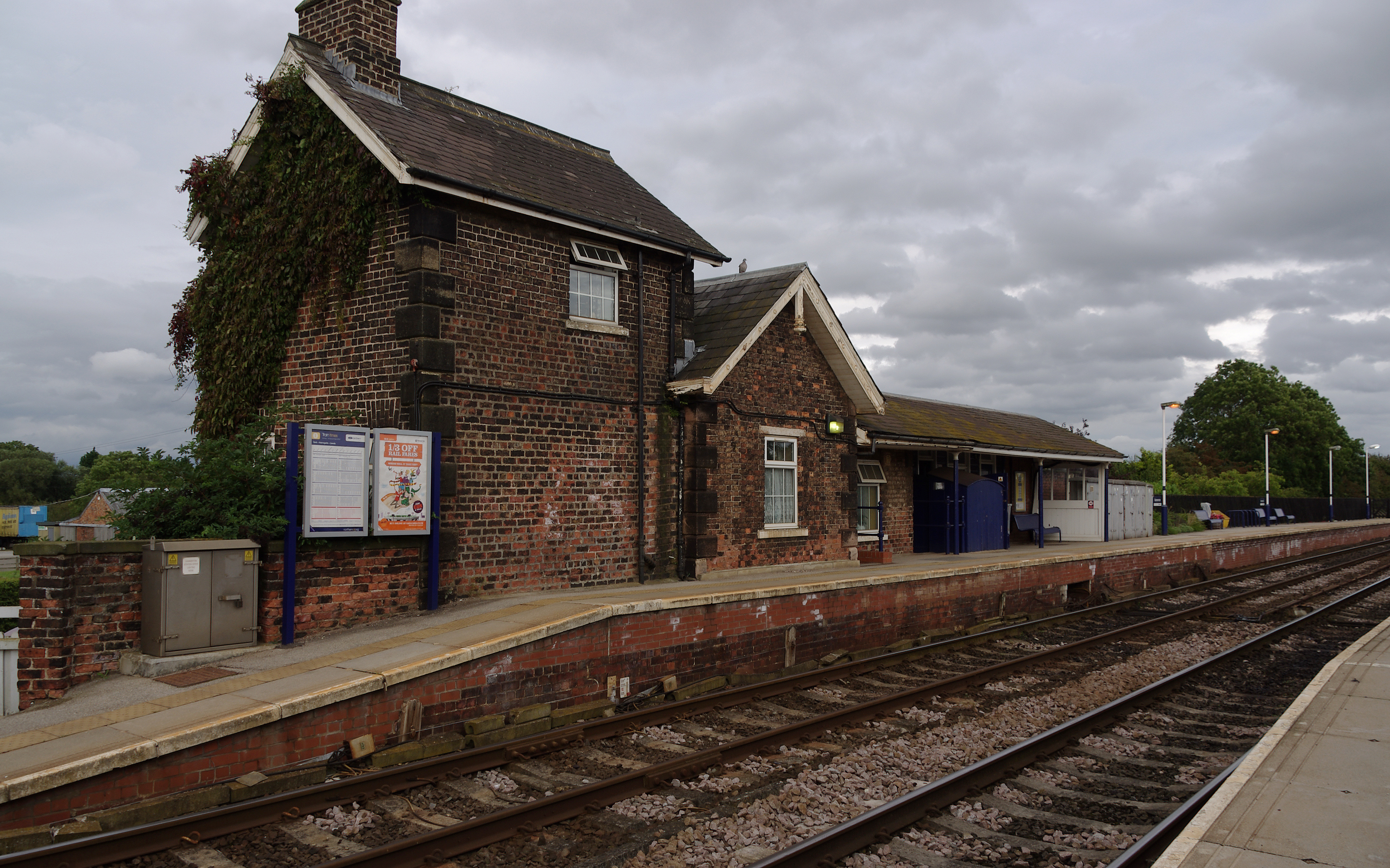

General information
- Location: Kirk Hammerton, North Yorkshire; England
- Coordinates: 53°59′47″N 1°17′03″W
- Grid reference: SE470558
- Owner: Network Rail
- Manager: Northern Trains
- Platforms: 2
- Tracks: 2

Other information
- Station code: HMM
- Classification: DfT category F2

History
- Original company: East and West Yorkshire Junction Railway
- Pre-grouping: North Eastern Railway
- Post-grouping: London and North Eastern Railway; British Rail (North Eastern Region)

Key dates
- 30 October 1848: Opened

Passengers
- 2020/21: ▼5,994
- 2021/22: ▲25,952
- 2022/23: ▲32,844
- 2023/24: ▲42,322
- 2024/25: ▲56,850
Location
- Location within North Yorkshire
Notes
- Passenger statistics from the Office of Rail and Road

Hammerton is a railway station on the Harrogate Line, which runs between Leeds and York via Harrogate. The station, situated 8 3/4 miles (14 km) west of York, serves the villages of Green Hammerton and Kirk Hammerton in North Yorkshire, England. It is owned by Network Rail and managed by Northern Trains.

== Facilities ==
Like other stations on this line, it is unstaffed so travellers must purchase their tickets on the train or in advance via a smartphone app. There is a waiting room available on the York-bound platform which is open from 06:45–22:30 (10:45-21:45 on Sunday). Both platforms also have shelters. The station features step-free access to both platforms via short ramps and access between platforms is via the level crossing. There is also cycle storage for up to 10 bicycles on the York-bound platform and a small car park to the rear of the station building with parking for five vehicles. Digital information screens and a long-line P.A system provide train running information for passengers.

The station building here is still partly in railway use, as it houses the office for the signaller who operates the manual level crossing gates and signalling equipment (the points and signals are worked from a covered ground frame on the platform).

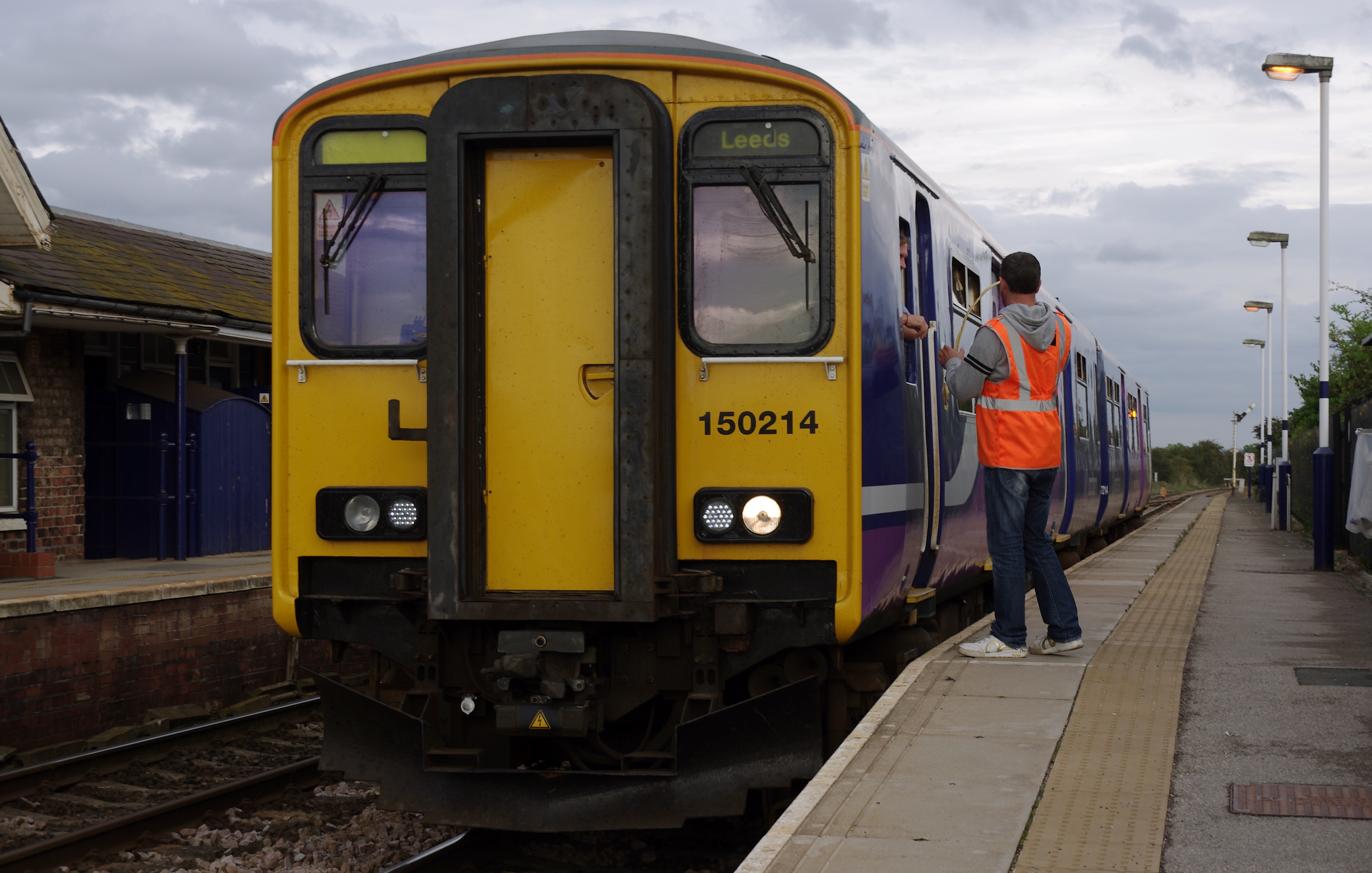
Driver handing over the single line token for the section between Hammerton and Poppleton.

The service arriving from York is timed to arrive before the one from Leeds and Harrogate. This allows for exchange of the token for the single line block between Hammerton and Poppleton.

== Services ==
As of the May 2023 timetable change, the station is served by a half hourly service to Leeds and York. All services are operated by Northern Trains.

Rolling stock used: Class 150/155/158 Sprinter and Class 170 Turbostar

== See also ==
- Listed buildings in Kirk Hammerton

Preceding station	National Rail	Following station
Cattal	Northern Trains; Harrogate Line	Poppleton
	Historical railways	
Cattal	East and West Yorkshire Junction Railway; Harrogate Line	Wilstrop Siding
