= Wilstrop Siding railway station =

Disused railway station in North Yorkshire, England

Wilstrop Siding
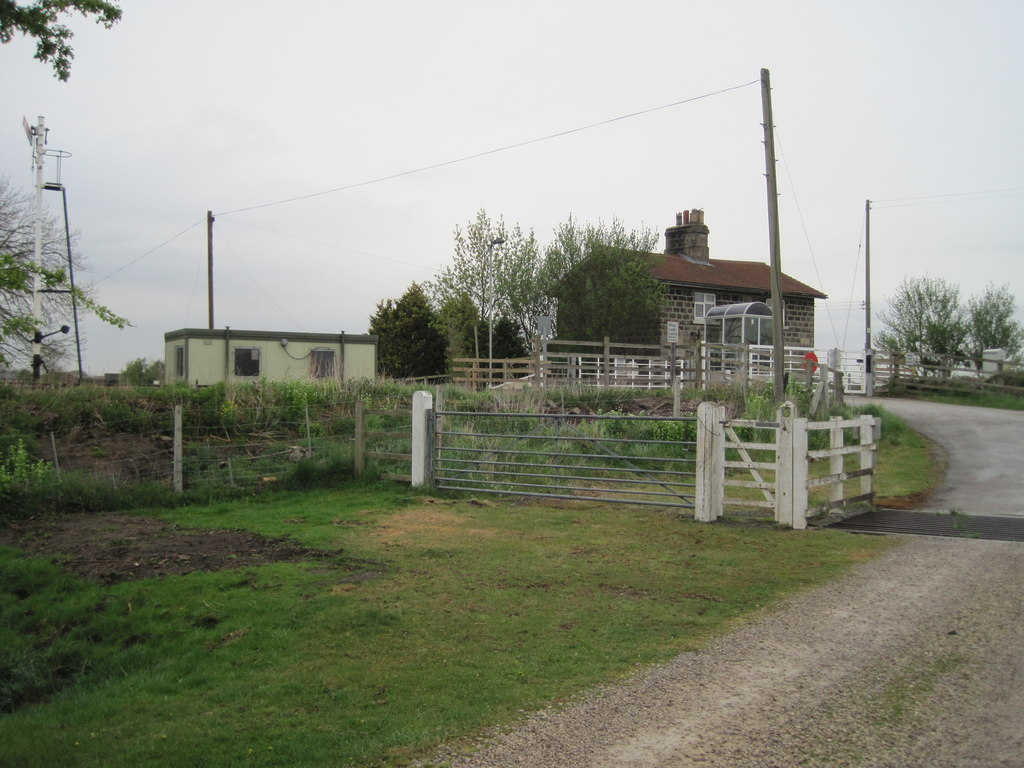
- Site of the station (2013)

General information
- Location: Wilstrop and Skipbridge, North Yorkshire; England
- Coordinates: 53.9932°N 1.2556°W
- Grid reference: SE489555
- Platforms: 2

Other information
- Status: Disused

History
- Original company: North Eastern Railway
- Pre-grouping: North Eastern Railway
- Post-grouping: LNER; British Railways (North Eastern)

Key dates
- June 1865: Opened
- 1 May 1931: Closed to passengers
- 4 May 1964: Closed completely
Location

Wilstrop railway station served Wilstrop and Skipbridge, North Yorkshire, England from 1865 to 1964 on the Harrogate line.

== History ==
The station opened in June 1865 by the North Eastern Railway. The station was situated at the level crossing on a lane off the A59. A goods siding was installed southeast of the level crossing, complete with a shelter over the track. There was no lighting at the platforms due to the trains calling at the station in daylight hours no matter what season it was, so lighting was unnecessary. The last passenger train called at the station on 25 April 1931 but the station formally closed to passengers on 1 May 1931. The station closed to goods traffic on 4 May 1964.

The site is now home to an Occupation crossing. Staffed by a Crossing Keeper, and with signal protection, users may cross the railway. Wilstrop is rather unique, as the house at the crossing is lived in by the resident Crossing Keeper.

Preceding station	Historical railways	Following station
Marston Moor; Line open, station closed	North Eastern Railway; Harrogate line	Hammerton; Line and station open
