= Goldsborough railway station =

Disused railway station in North Yorkshire, England

Goldsborough
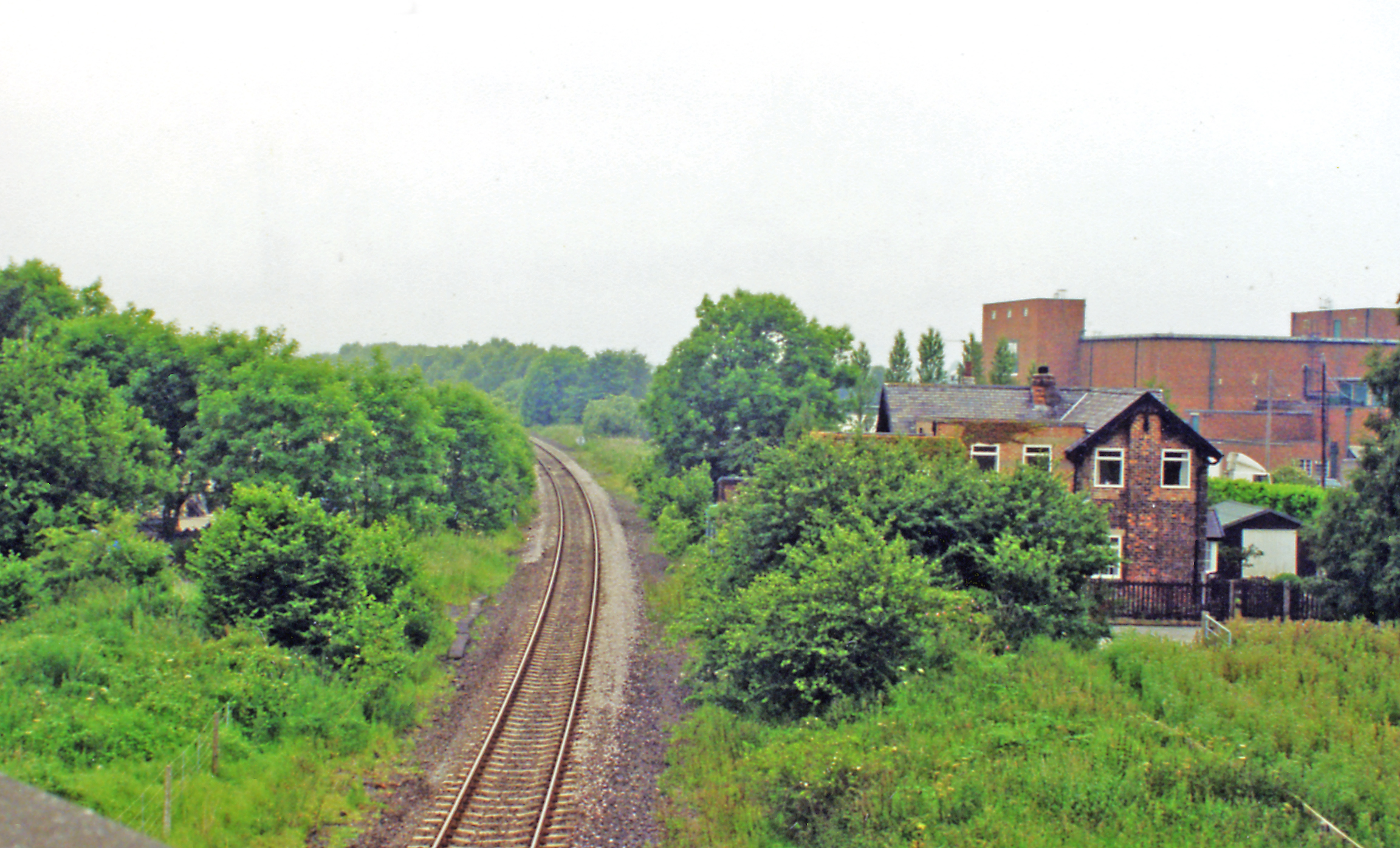
- The site of the station in July 2000

General information
- Location: Goldsborough, North Yorkshire; England
- Coordinates: 54.0098°N 1.4027°W
- Grid reference: SE392572
- Platforms: 2

Other information
- Status: Disused

History
- Original company: East and West Yorkshire Junction Railway
- Pre-grouping: North Eastern Railway
- Post-grouping: LNER British Railways (North Eastern)

Key dates
- February 1850: Opened
- 15 September 1958: Closed to passengers
- 3 May 1965: Closed completely
Location

Goldsborough railway station served the village of Goldsborough, North Yorkshire, England from 1850 to 1965 on the Harrogate line. The station was over 13 miles (21 km) west of York railway station, and nearly 3 miles (4.8 km) east of Knaresborough.

The site of the station has been bought by a development company, with a view to reopening as Flaxby Parkway.

== History ==
The station was opened in February 1850 by the East and West Yorkshire Junction Railway, however, passenger trains stopped at the site on market days since the line's opening in October 1848. The station was situated close to the A59 bridge over the railway, and was geographically closer to the village of Flaxby, but was named Goldsborough as the users of the stately home at Goldsborough Hall used the station. The station was listed variously in timetables as either Gouldsborough, Goldsboro', or G'boro. One writer states that the name of Goldsborough was used instead of Flaxby to avoid confusion with the station of Flaxton on the York to Scarborough line.

The station site was 2 3/4 miles (4.4 km) east of Knaresborough and 13 miles (21 km) west of York. The platforms were staggered either side of the former Flaxby Road level crossing (what used to be the A59 road, before a bypass was built), with the down platform (towards Knaresborough) on the east of the level crossing, and the up platform (towards York) on the other side.

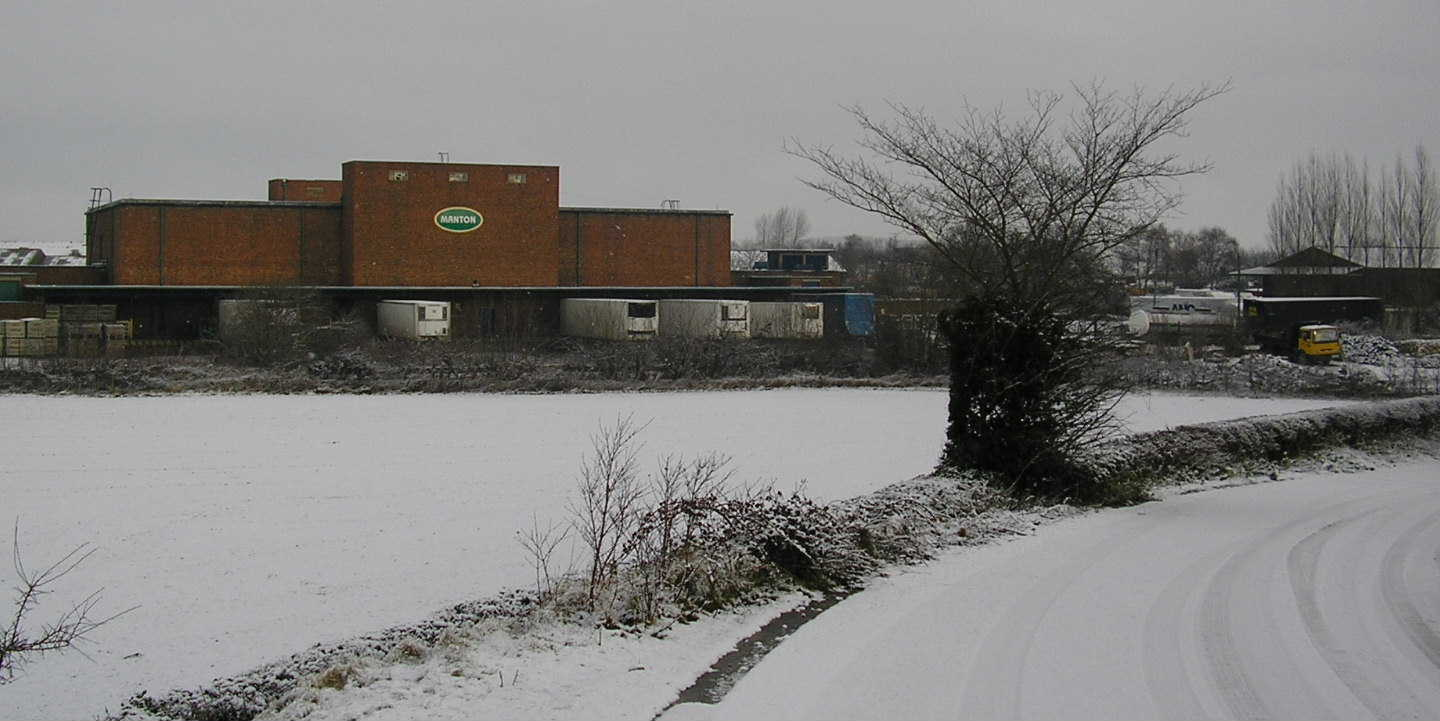
Goldsborough Cold Store, near Flaxby, North Yorkshire

In 1922, the North Eastern Railway estimated that the local population was 374 and 4,405 ticket were sold; goods traffic handled at the station were livestock and 251 tonnes (277 tons) of barley. The goods facilities and coal depot were located west of the up platform with a small timber warehouse beside the crossing. When World War II began, a huge brick buildings was built northwest of the station, which was a refrigerated cold store where the Ministry of Food could house emergency meat. On completion, two private sidings were provided running on either side of the brick monolith and two loop reception sidings. The cold store was demolished in 2016.

In the 1877 Bradshaws Timetable, seven trains in both directions were listed as stopping at the station. By 1906, this was down to six return workings, and in 1946, six services to York, but only five to Harrogate.

In the summer of 1958 the services at the station were reduced to one in each direction. The station closed to passengers on 15 September 1958 and to goods traffic on 3 May 1965. With the reduction in freight services along the line, the track was singled through the station site in 1973.

In December 2017, it was proposed that the station could reopen as Flaxby Parkway to serve a new development nearby. In 2019, a development company bought the station site with a view to reopening not only to serve their proposed new village nearby, but also to help ease traffic flow on the adjacent A59 road. The location of the site so close to the A1(M) is seen as a potential for a new parkway station.

Preceding station	Historical railways	Following station
Hopperton; Line open, station closed	East and West Yorkshire Junction Railway; Harrogate line	Knaresborough Hay Park Lane; Line open, station closed
