= Starbeck railway station =

Railway station in North Yorkshire, England

Starbeck
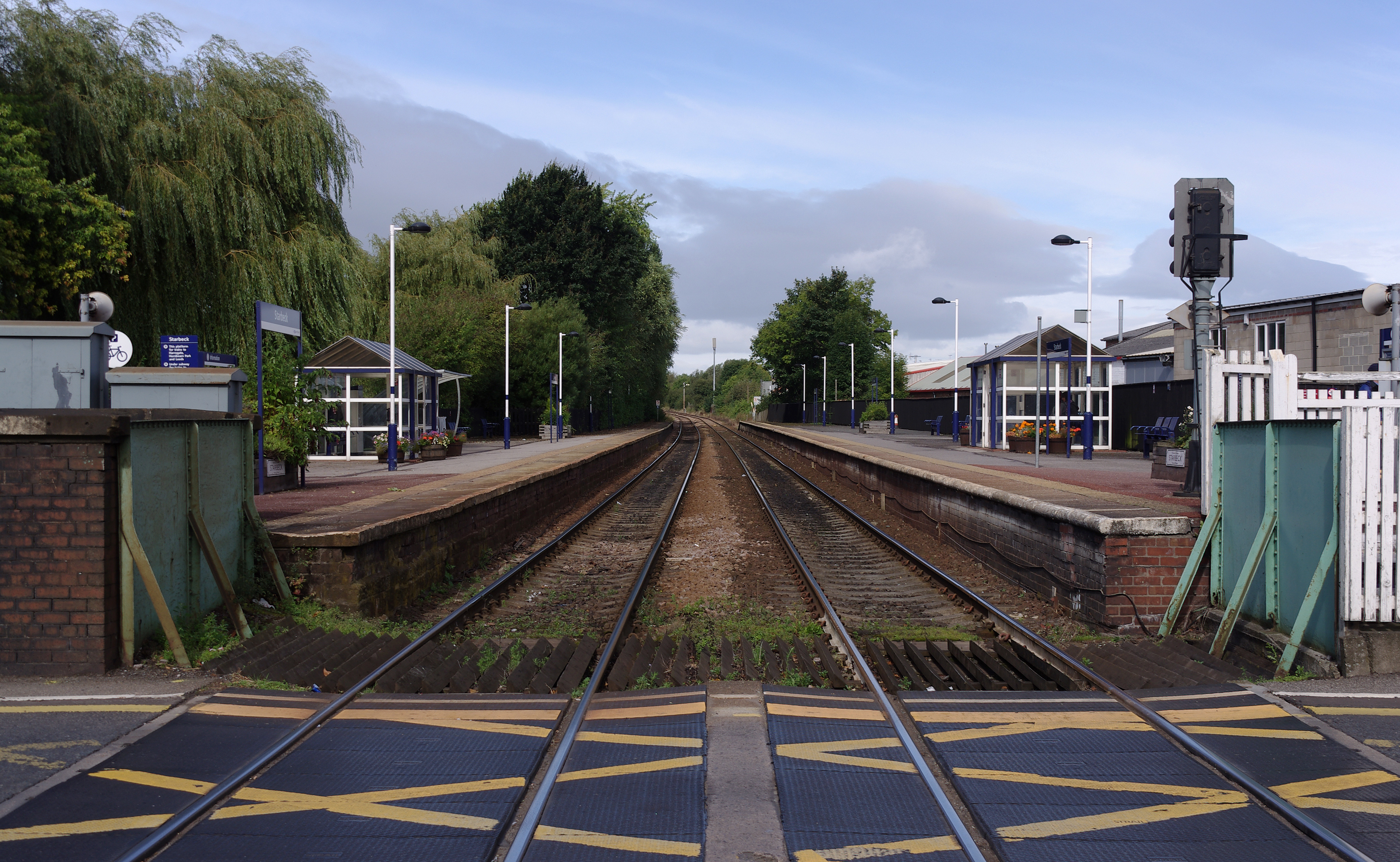

General information
- Location: Starbeck, North Yorkshire; England
- Coordinates: 53°59′56″N 1°30′02″W
- Grid reference: SE328560
- Owner: Network Rail
- Manager: Northern Trains
- Platforms: 2
- Tracks: 2

Other information
- Station code: SBE
- Classification: DfT category F1

History
- Original company: Leeds and Thirsk Railway
- Pre-grouping: North Eastern Railway
- Post-grouping: London and North Eastern Railway; British Rail (North Eastern Region)

Key dates
- 14 September 1848: Opened as Harrogate and Knaresborough
- 1857: Renamed Starbeck

Passengers
- 2020/21: ▼54,194
- 2021/22: ▲0.157 million
- 2022/23: ▲0.194 million
- 2023/24: ▲0.225 million
- 2024/25: ▲0.267 million
Location
- Location within North Yorkshire
Notes
- Passenger statistics from the Office of Rail and Road

Starbeck is a railway station on the Harrogate Line, which runs between Leeds and York via Harrogate. The station, situated 18 1/4 miles (29 km) west of York, serves the village of Starbeck, in North Yorkshire, England. It is owned by Network Rail and managed by Northern Trains.

== Background ==
The station dates from 1 September 1848 and was the first to serve Harrogate. Initially, intending passengers had to make the 2 1/2 miles (4 km) connection from the town on foot or by horse-drawn omnibus, as the Leeds and Thirsk Railway had elected to take an easily graded route to the east, rather than cross the Crimple Valley and serve the town itself.

The line on to Ripon and Thirsk was opened the following July, with a further line to Knaresborough and York opened by the East and West Yorkshire Junction Railway on 1 October 1851. However, it was not until both companies had been absorbed by the North Eastern Railway some years later that the issue of a link into the centre of Harrogate was addressed, with a route via Dragon Junction to a new central station (and on via Crimple Valley Viaduct to Pannal Junction) being commissioned on 1 August 1862. This new loop soon became the preferred route for most through traffic between Leeds and Teesside, leaving Starbeck to be served primarily by York trains although some freight and excursion traffic continued to use the original L&T line for many years.

Services on the old line to Pannal ended in October 1951, whilst the Leeds Northern main line to Ripon and Northallerton was closed to passengers in March 1967 and completely two years later.

The station at one time had canopies and substantial buildings, but these have been demolished. The signal box remains in use to supervise a busy level crossing.

There are proposals to create another station between Starbeck and Harrogate at Bilton.

== Facilities ==
The station is unstaffed, but has ticket machines available. Shelters, timetable information boards and customer information screens, updated in 2025, are located on each platform – these are linked by a subway with ramps, so both have step-free access. Running information is also offered by means of automatic public address announcements.

== Services ==
As of the June 2024 timetable change, the station is served by two trains per hour between Leeds and York all week. Additional services operate at peak times, although some may originate or terminate at Knaresborough. During the evening, an hourly service operates between Leeds and York. All services are operated by Northern Trains.

Rolling stock used: British Rail Class 150, British Rail Class 155, Class 158 Express Sprinter and Class 170 Turbostar

== Sources ==
- Body, G. (1988), PSL Field Guides - Railways of the Eastern Region Volume 2, Patrick Stephens Ltd, Wellingborough, ISBN 1-85260-072-1

Preceding station	National Rail	Following station
Harrogate	Northern Trains; Harrogate Line	Knaresborough
