= Knaresborough railway station =

Railway station in North Yorkshire, England

Knaresborough
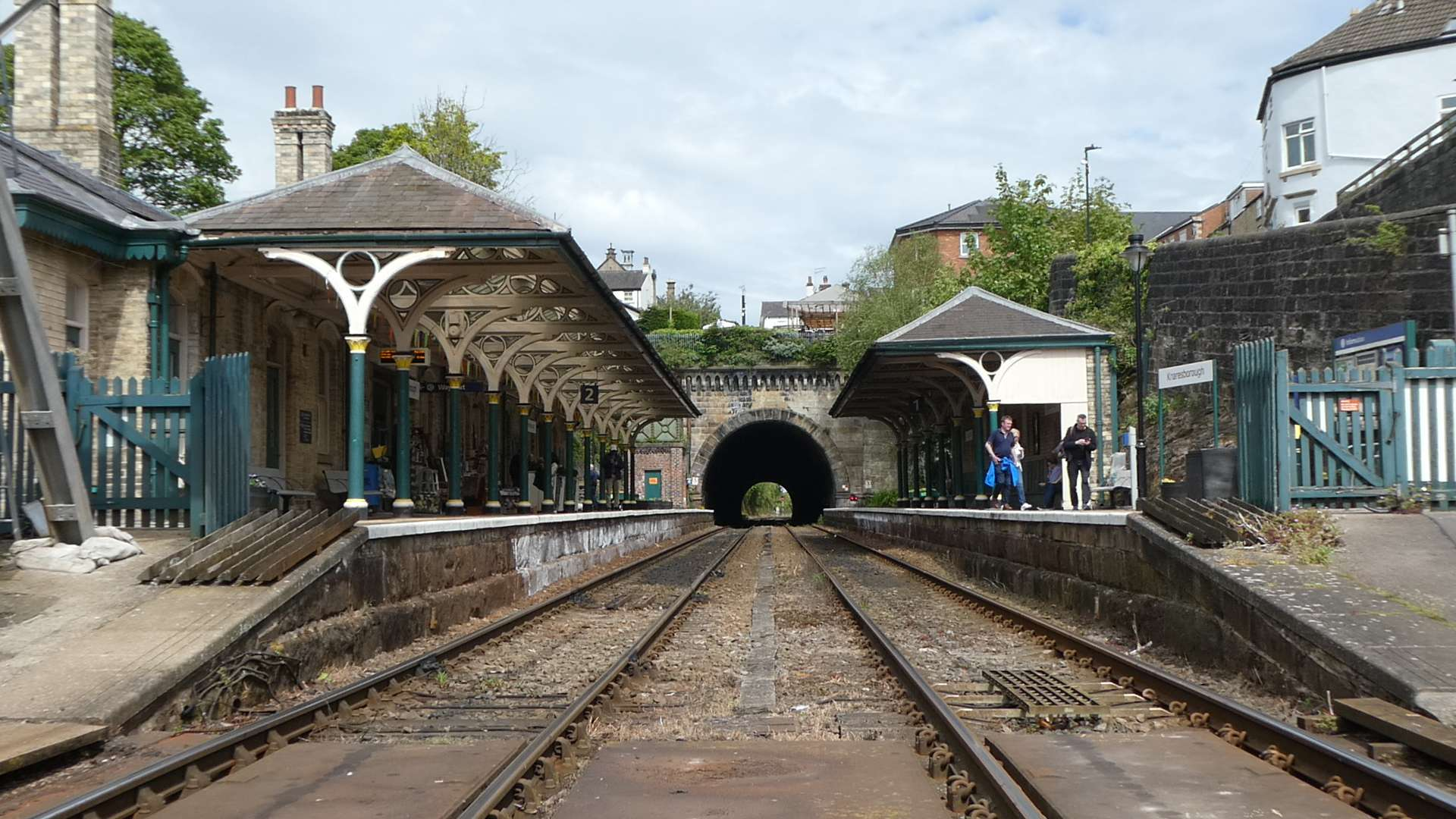
- View of the platforms from the railway crossing

General information
- Location: Knaresborough, North Yorkshire; England
- Coordinates: 54.0090°N 1.4703°W
- Grid reference: SE348571
- Manager: Northern Trains
- Platforms: 2

Other information
- Station code: KNA
- Classification: DfT category F1

History
- Original company: East and West Yorkshire Junction Railway
- Pre-grouping: North Eastern Railway
- Post-grouping: London and North Eastern Railway

Key dates
- 30 October 1848: Temporary station opened at Hay Park Lane, Knaresborough
- 21 July 1851: Permanent Knaresborough station opened

Passengers
- 2020/21: ▼0.117 million
- 2021/22: ▲0.387 million
- 2022/23: ▲0.464 million
- 2023/24: ▲0.506 million
- 2024/25: ▲0.605 million

Listed Building – Grade II
- Feature: Knaresborough Station
- Designated: 12 March 1986
- Reference no.: 1277673
Location
Notes
- Passenger statistics from the Office of Rail and Road

Knaresborough railway station is a Grade II listed station serving the town of Knaresborough in North Yorkshire, England. It is located on the Harrogate Line 16 miles 50 chains (26.8 km) from York between Starbeck and Cattal, and is managed by Northern Trains, who operate all services.

The station is located at the north-eastern end of the Knaresborough Viaduct off Station Road to the north-west side of Knaresborough town centre. The station is within walking distance of the town centre.

== History ==
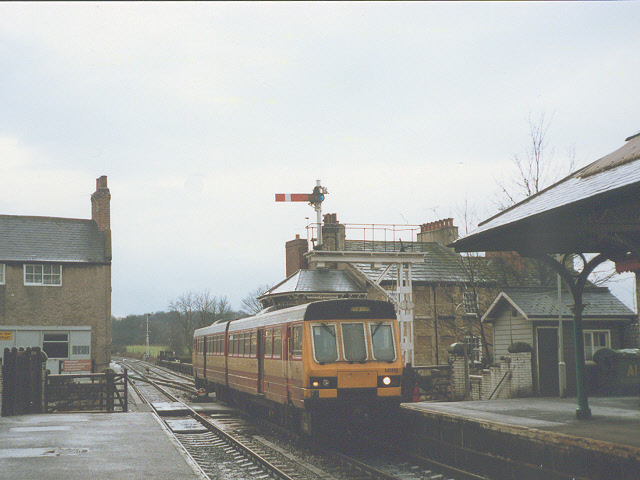
British Rail Class 141 arriving at the station in 1992

The East and West Yorkshire Junction Railway (E&WJR) was opened from York (Poppleton Junction) to a temporary terminus known as Hay Park Lane, Knaresborough on 30 October 1848. The E&WYJR was absorbed by the York and North Midland Railway on 1 July 1851. Three weeks later, with the completion of the stone viaduct crossing the River Nidd at Knaresborough on 21 July 1851, the temporary station was closed and a new Knaresborough station opened on the current site just beyond the stone viaduct.

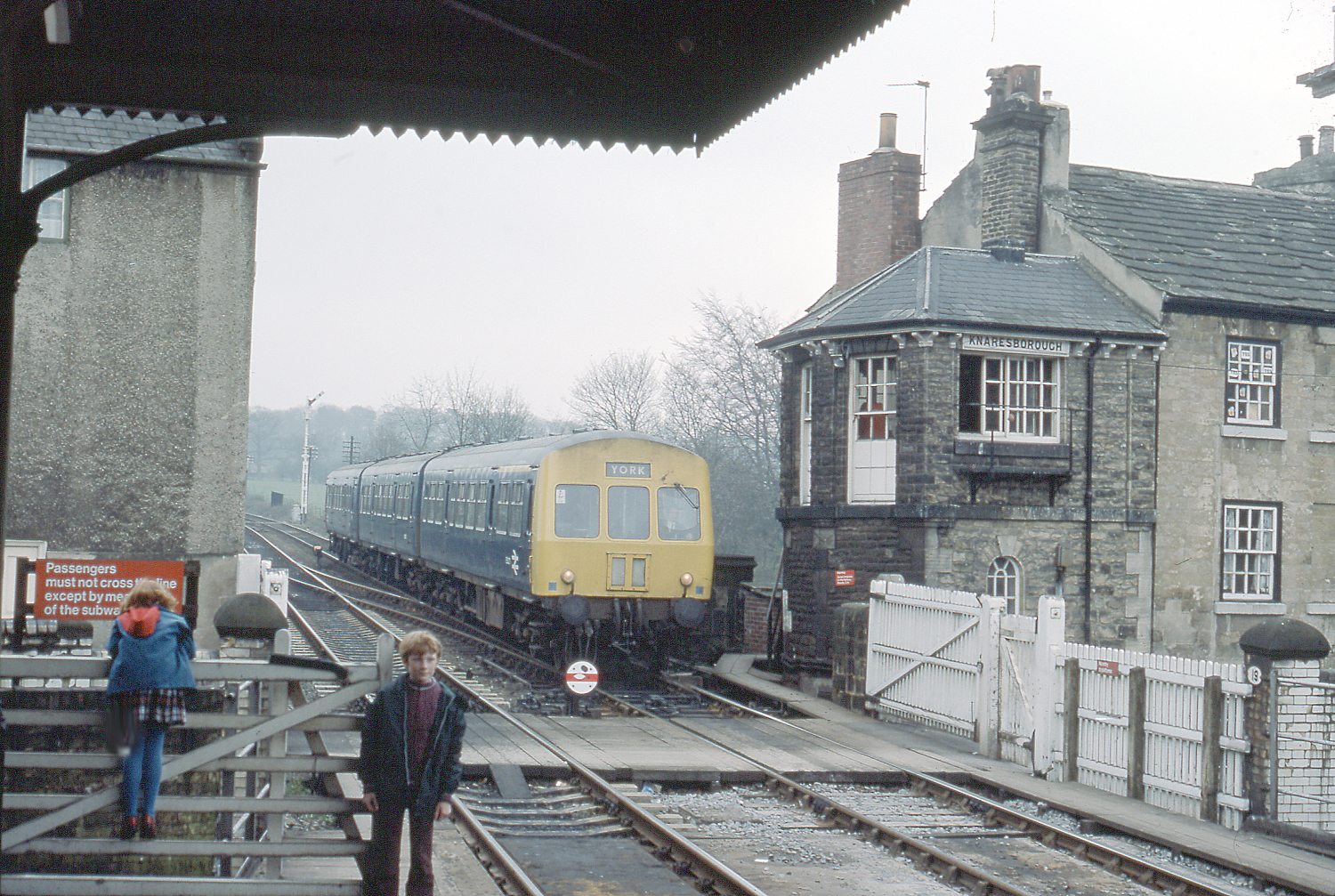
View south-west with distinctive signal box

In 1865 the North Eastern Railway replaced the 1851 station with a new one designed by Thomas Prosser. The station was rebuilt c.1890. The 1851 water tower is still extant, and is Grade II listed.

Beyond the platforms eastbound is a tunnel which separated the station from the goods yard and the line's major junction. The Knaresborough to Boroughbridge branch (1875–1950 for passengers, 1964 for goods) diverged from the main line to York opposite the goods yard. This line continued north-east until it met the East Coast Main Line between York and Northallerton at Pilmoor. The tunnel is still extant with both north and south portals are now listed structures.

The station signal box supervises the single line section eastwards to Cattal, an adjacent level crossing and a crossover that is used to reverse those trains from Leeds that terminate here. Built in 1890, it is unusual in that it was built onto the end of an adjoining row of terraced houses on Kirkgate. It is separately Grade II listed. It was damaged by a runaway vehicle in July 2025.

== Facilities ==
The station is unstaffed, but has a single ticket machine available. All the original station buildings are in private commercial use – one of these is a cafe (sited in the old booking office). Both platforms have shelters and are linked by a subway and the level crossing. Step-free access is via separate entrances to each platform. A long-line public address system and customer information screens are in place to provide train running details.

== Passenger volume ==
Passenger volume at Knaresborough
	2004–05	2005–06	2006–07	2007–08	2008–09	2009–10	2010–11	2011–12	2012–13	2013–14	2014–15	2015–16	2016–17	2017–18	2018–19	2019–20	2020–21	2021–22	2022–23	2023–24	2024–25
Entries and exits	239,754	248,986	248,655	245,422	257,714	277,722	302,776	325,872	331,308	339,938	353,704	349,516	383,118	386,062	410,710	439,486	116,834	387,240	463,724	506,446	605,486

The statistics cover twelve month periods that start in April.

== Services ==
All week, there is a half-hourly service between Leeds and York (eastbound). Additional services run between Leeds and Knaresborough during weekday peak periods. During evenings, there is an hourly service in each direction.

Preceding station	National Rail	Following station
Starbeck	Northern Trains Harrogate Line	Cattal
Starbeck	Northern Trains Harrogate Line	Terminus

== Future ==
On 5 March 2015, the Harrogate Line, amongst others in the area including the Leeds-Bradford Interchange-Halifax Line, the Selby-Hull Line and the Northallerton-Middlesbrough Line, were named top priority for electrification; the estimated cost for the Harrogate Line was £93 million, with a projected cost-benefit ratio of 1/1.80. No implementation date has been set however.

Money has been set aside for the doubling of the single line sections between Knaresborough and York. This will allow capacity improvements along the whole line. The projected completion date for this work is 2018.

== See also ==
- Listed buildings in Knaresborough

== Bibliography ==
- Marshall, Geoff; Pipe, Vicki (2018). The Railway Adventures: Places, Trains, People and Stations. September Publishing. ISBN 978-1910463871.
