= Harrogate railway station =

Railway station in North Yorkshire, England

Harrogate
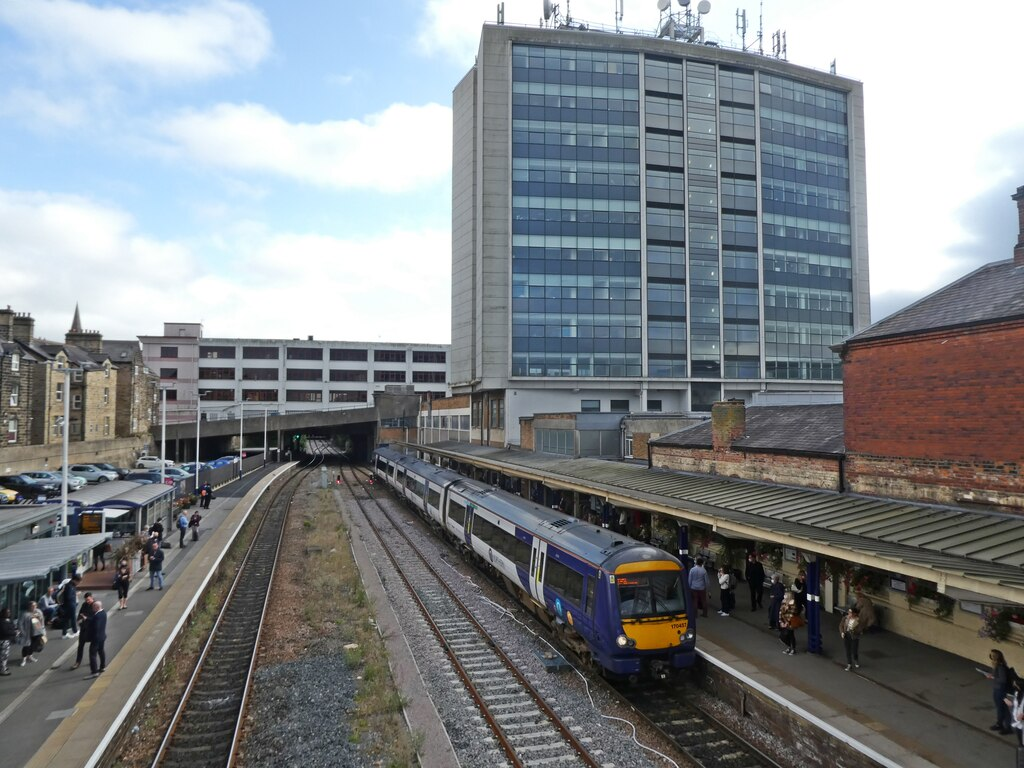
- The station in 2021

General information
- Location: Harrogate, North Yorkshire; England
- Coordinates: 53.9933°N 1.5374°W
- Grid reference: SE304553
- Managed by: Northern Trains
- Transit authority: West Yorkshire (Metro)
- Platforms: 2

Other information
- Station code: HGT
- Fare zone: 6
- Classification: DfT category C1

History
- Opened: 1 August 1862
- Original company: North Eastern Railway
- Post-grouping: London and North Eastern Railway

Passengers
- 2020/21: ▼0.353 million
- 2021/22: ▲1.212 million
- 2022/23: ▲1.503 million
- 2023/24: ▲1.617 million
- 2024/25: ▲1.879 million
Location
Notes
- Passenger statistics from the Office of Rail and Road

Harrogate railway station serves the town of Harrogate in North Yorkshire, England. Located on the Harrogate Line it is 18.25 miles (29 km) north of Leeds. Northern Trains operate the station and provide local passenger train services, with a London North Eastern Railway service to and from London King's Cross running six times per day.

== History ==
The station was opened by the North Eastern Railway on 1 August 1862. It was designed by the architect Thomas Prosser and was the first building in Harrogate built of brick and had two platforms. Before it opened (and the associated approach lines), the town's rail routes had been somewhat fragmented – the York and North Midland Railway branch line from Church Fenton via Tadcaster had a terminus in the town (see below), but the Leeds Northern Railway main line between Leeds and Thirsk bypassed it to the east to avoid costly engineering work to cross the Crimple Valley and the East and West Yorkshire Junction Railway from York terminated at Starbeck. Once the individual companies had become part of the NER, the company concentrated all lines at a new through passenger station closer to the town centre.

A storm in November 1866 caused a chimney stack to fall through the station roof causing considerable damage. In 1873, a footbridge was added.

The booking office was robbed on 7 December 1868 when thieves drilled through the ticket window covering with a bit and brace, and stole a small amount of cash.

The station platforms were lengthened by 100 yards in 1883, largely as a result of the opening of a second route to Leeds via Wetherby (the Cross Gates to Wetherby Line) in 1876. However it was not until 1902 that a new station and connecting line at Wetherby permitted through running to Leeds without reversal. Extensive alterations at Harrogate took place in 1897, including the construction of two new bay platforms on the east side at the south end of the station, a new footbridge, and a new signal cabin. The following year saw the opening of a large new goods depot on Bower Road (where the Asda supermarket now stands) and the associated changes to the track layout necessitated another new signal cabin at the north end of the station.

In 1892, the actor, Harry Fischer, was shot at by Violet Gordon at the station. She missed and was arrested by the police.

The station was largely demolished in 1964/65 and replaced with a more utilitarian one (with fewer platforms) by Taylor Bown and Miller, Architects (Harrogate). The platform awning on the west side had previously seen service in Sunderland and was re-used at Harrogate. A car park now occupies the site of the former bay platforms on the south side. It coincided with the loss of three of the main routes through the town in the Beeching Axe – both routes via Wetherby closed to passenger traffic on 6 January 1964 and the Leeds Northern route to Northallerton via Ripon on 6 March 1967.

The York branch was included in Beeching's 1963 report, but it was reprieved in 1966 and remains open. The original, attractive wrought iron footbridge remained until the mid-2000s when it was taken down and replaced by a modern plain steel one further down the platform. The station was serviced by a cafe called the 'Circle Bar' until its closure in the 1990s.

== Facilities ==
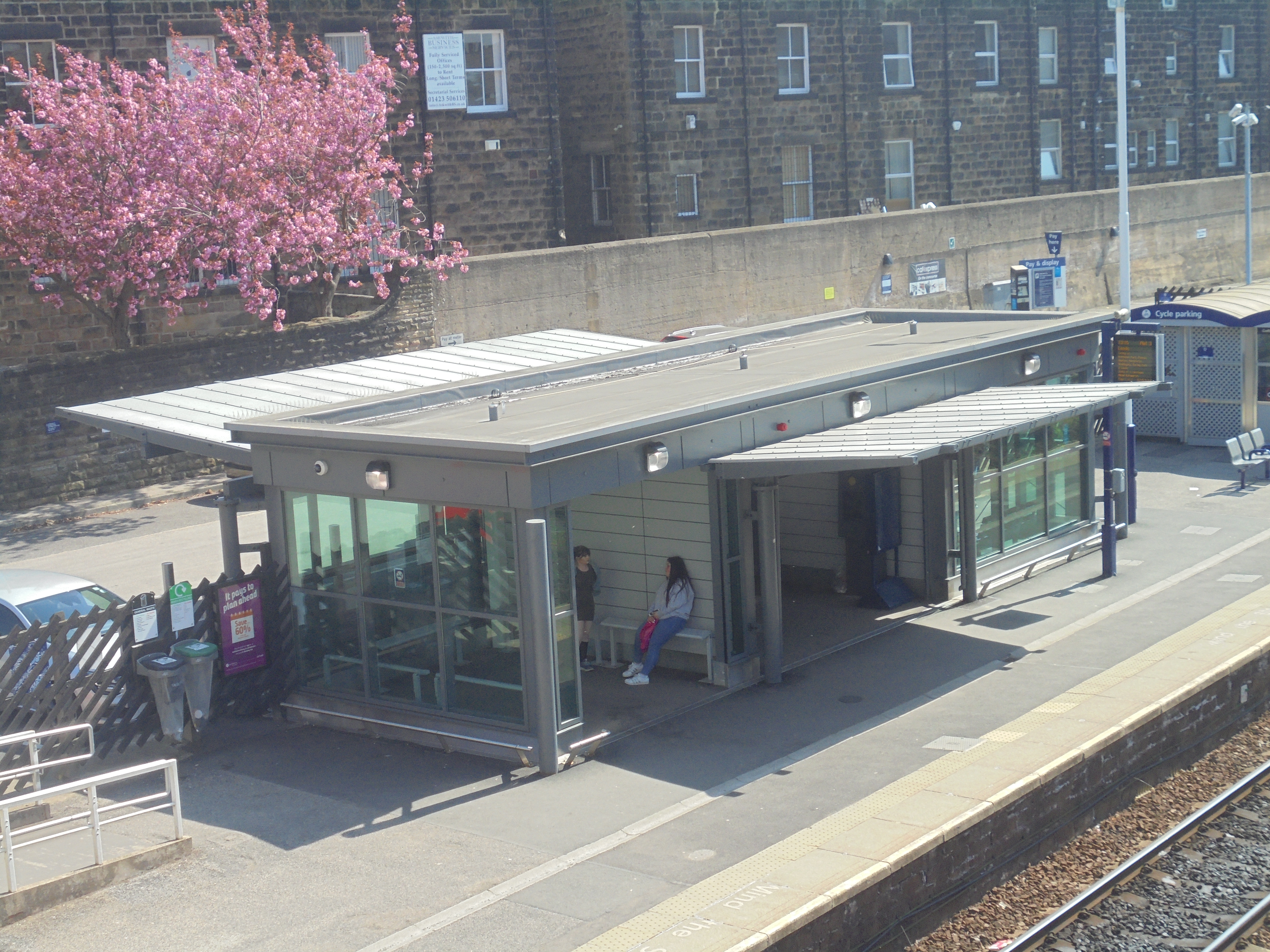
A small building was added on the Leeds bound platform in the 2010s facilitating access from East Parade

The station has a staffed ticket office open seven days a week (except late evenings), along with ticket machines. Facilities include a key cutters, ATMs, a cafe, photo booths and a waiting room, all located on the main concourse on Platform 1. The station has three platforms, but only platforms 1 and 3 are in operation – platform 2 (an east-facing bay) is not in public use. Full step-free access is available to both main platforms and they are linked by a footbridge with lifts. Ticket barriers were installed in early 2017.

== Services ==
The Monday to Sunday service is generally 2tph to Leeds (southbound); and 2tph to York

Services increase in frequency at peak time to Leeds, resulting in 3tph (trains per hour).

Late evenings an hourly service operates between Leeds, Harrogate and York.

London North Eastern Railway operates six daily services to and from London King's Cross on Mondays to Saturdays. These trains also provide a third hourly clockface service to Leeds every two hours.

Preceding station	National Rail	Following station
Horsforth	London North Eastern Railway; East Coast Main Line Via Harrogate Line	Terminus
Hornbeam Park	Northern Trains; Harrogate Line	Starbeck

== Harrogate (Brunswick) station ==
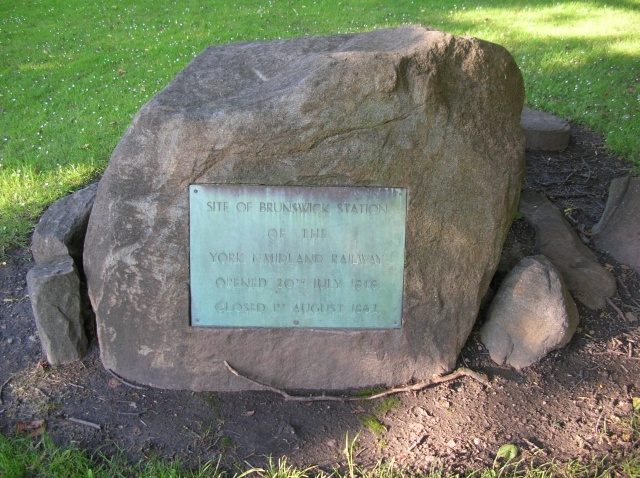
Plaque marking the site of Harrogate Brunswick Railway Station

Harrogate's first railway station, Brunswick, was the terminus of York and North Midland Railway's branch line and the first train arrived there on 20 July 1848. There was a short tunnel between what is now Hornbeam Park Station, running under Langcliffe Avenue, and emerging on the west side of Leeds Road.The station was situated on the area, now part of the Stray, between the site where Trinity Methodist Church now stands and the Prince of Wales roundabout, and some distance from either High or Low Harrogate. It took its name from the nearby Brunswick Hotel, renamed the Prince of Wales during the First World War. When the new line of the North Eastern Railway opened on 1 August 1862, entering Harrogate via a cutting across the Stray, Brunswick closed to passenger traffic, although remaining in use for some time as a coal depot. In 1866 the tunnel was "fitted up for carriages to stand in during the winter" but it is not known how long this arrangement lasted.

== Ripon Railway ==
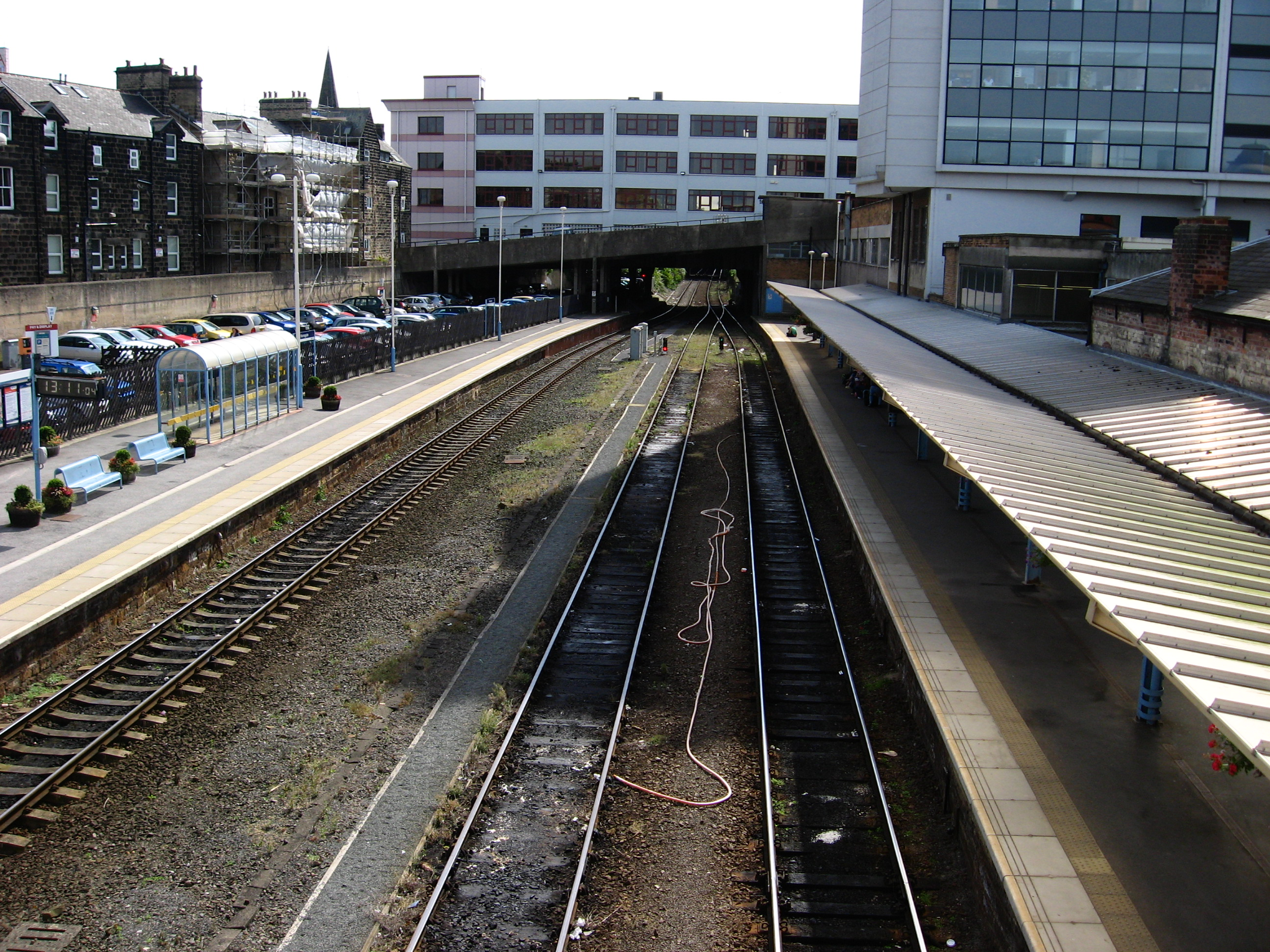
Harrogate station's platforms and tracks, seen from the pedestrian overbridge.

The town was previously served by a railway, the Leeds-Northallerton Line that ran between Leeds and Northallerton via this station and Ripon. It was once part of the North Eastern Railway and then LNER. The site is now occupied by Starbeck railway station.

The Ripon Line was closed to passengers on 6 March 1967 and to freight on 5 September 1969 as part of the wider Beeching Axe, despite a vigorous campaign by local campaigners, including the city's MP. Today much of the route of the line through the city is now a relief road and although the former station still stands, it is now surrounded by a new housing development. The issue remains a significant one in local politics and there are movements wanting to restore the line. Reports suggest the reopening of a line between Ripon and Harrogate railway station would be economically viable, costing £40 million and could initially attract 1,200 passengers a day, rising to 2,700. Campaigners call on MPs to restore Ripon railway link.

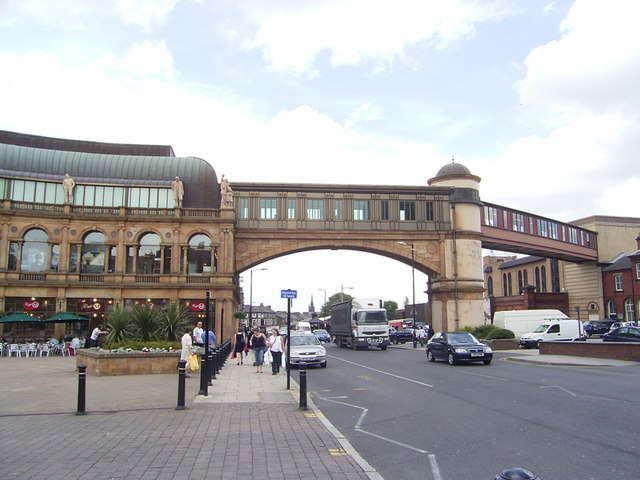
A61 Station Parade, Harrogate
