= East and West Yorkshire Junction Railway =

Railway line in Yorkshire, England

The East and West Yorkshire Junction Railway was a railway company established in 1846 between the Leeds and Thirsk Railway at Knaresborough and the York, Newcastle and Berwick Railway near York, England. The company merged into the York and North Midland Railway in 1852.

As of 2026 the route forms part of the modern Harrogate Line, operated by Northern.

== History ==
East and West Yorkshire Junction Railway Act 1846
- Act of Parliament
- Parliament of the United Kingdom
- Long title: An Act for making a Railway from Knaresborough to or near to the City of York, to be called "The East and West Yorkshire Junction Railway."
- Citation: 9 & 10 Vict. c. clxiv

Dates
- Royal assent: 16 July 1846

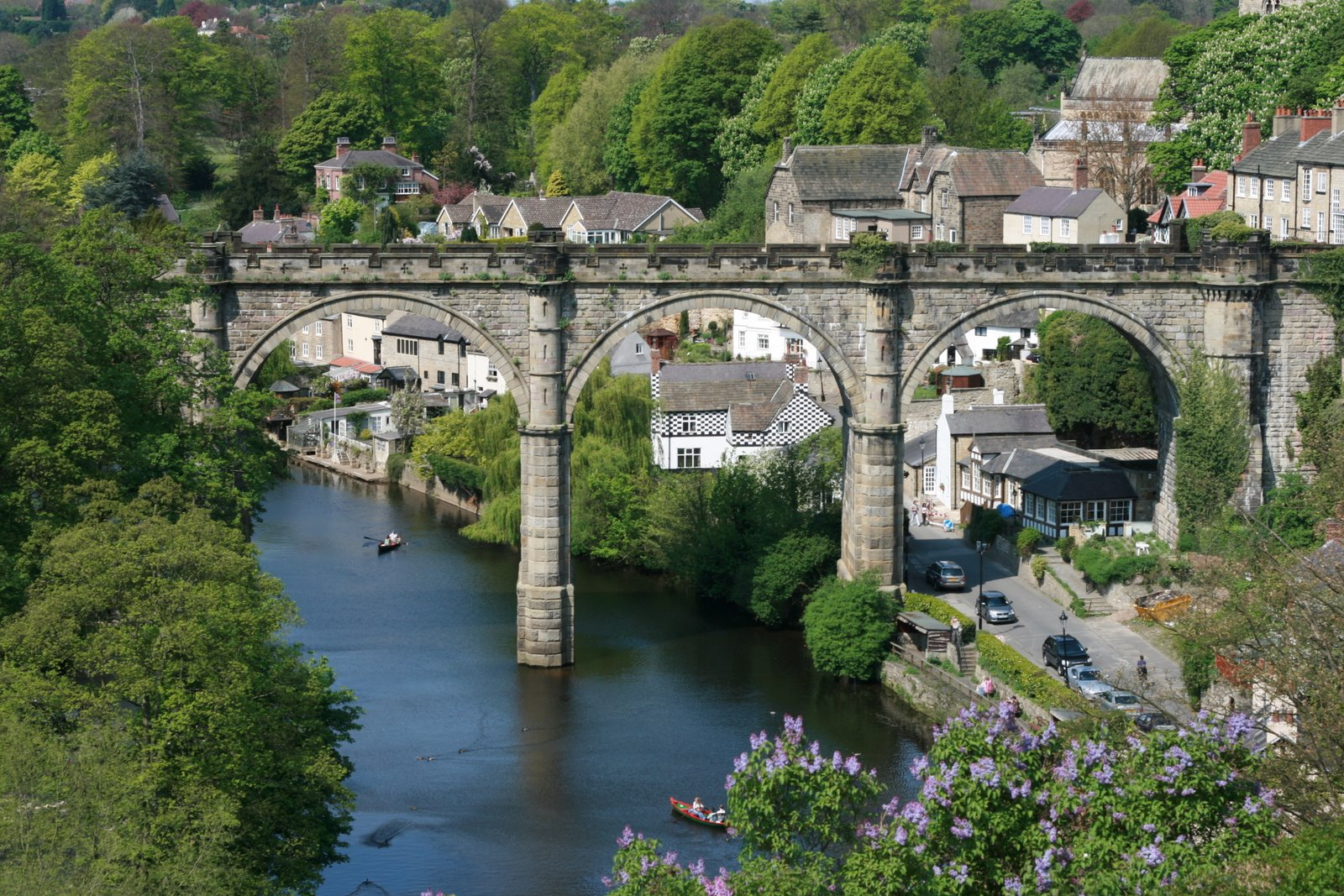
The 1851 Knaresborough River Nidd viaduct (2006)

The application to form "The East and West Yorkshire Junction Railway" was made in November 1845, and the company was incorporated by an act of Parliament, the East and West Yorkshire Junction Railway Act 1846 (9 & 10 Vict. c. clxiv), on 16 July 1846, this authorising £200,000 of capital (8,000 × £25 shares) and £66,600 of debt.

The line connected the Great North of England Railway (GNE) (later the York, Newcastle and Berwick Railway, YN&B) near York to the Leeds and Thirsk Railway (L&TR) at Knaresborough, with a route length of about 15 miles (24 km). The line branched from the GNE 1 mile 47 chains (2.55 km) from York station and passed through Poppleton, Hessay, Marston Moor, Hammerton, Cattal, Allerton and Goldsborough (originally Flaxby) to Knaresborough.

The line's engineer was Thomas Grainger and the main stations (Poppleton, Marston Moor, Cattal, and Allerton) were built by Samuel Atack to Grainger's designs. Construction began in 1847, works including a tunnel under part of Knaresborough and a viaduct over the River Nidd. The line was double tracked with a length of 14 miles 12 chains (22.8 km). On 11 March 1848 the nearly completed viaduct over the Nidd collapsed, and a temporary wooden station was constructed east of Knaresborough on Hay-A-Park Lane to allow the line to partially opened on 30 October 1848.

Originally backed by George Hudson, the company directors made an agreement with the rival L&TR, which had begun proceedings to absorb the company. (Note: The Leeds and Thirsk obtained an act of Parliament, the Leeds and Thirsk Railway (Harrogate and Pateley Branch and East and West Yorkshire Junction Railway Amalgamation) Act 1848 (11 & 12 Vict. c. lxviii) enabling them to absorb the line, passed 1848. The L&TR board halted the merger discussions in August 1848.) However, after the L&TR backed out of the arrangement in the middle of 1848, the directors returned to Hudson and made arrangements for the YN&B to work the line. After 1849 the line was worked with lighter engines from E. B. Wilson (Leeds) with payment on a worked miles basis, plus a percentage of revenue.

The York and North Midland Railway (Y&NMR) took over the line in July. The replacement four 56-foot (17 m) arch stone double track viaduct over the Nidd was completed at a cost of £9,803 and the section over the River Nidd connecting to the L&TR was opened on 1 October 1851. Knaresborough station opened the same year, completing the route to Harrogate made by the 1.75 mile Leeds Northern extension from Harrogate to Knaresborough that also completed in 1851. From October 1851 the line also used the L&TR Starbeck station in Harrogate.

York and North Midland (East and West Yorkshire Railway Amalgamation) Act 1852
- Act of Parliament
- Parliament of the United Kingdom
- Long title: An Act for amalgamating the East and West Yorkshire Junction Railway Company with the York and North Midland Railway Company, and for vesting the Undertaking of the former Company in that of the latter, and for other Purposes.
- Citation: 15 & 16 Vict. c. lvii

Dates
- Royal assent: 28 May 1852

Text of statute as originally enacted

Formal application to merge the railway with the Y&NMR was made in 1851 and the York and North Midland (East and West Yorkshire Railway Amalgamation) Act 1852 (15 & 16 Vict. c. lvii) was passed on 28 May 1852. On 1 April 1875 a 7-mile (11 km) single track line from Boroughbridge was opened, joining the line east of the town at Knaresborough Junction.

== See also ==
- Harrogate Line – Modern day name for the York to Knaresborough Line
- Pilmoor, Boroughbridge and Knaresborough Railway
