= Harrogate line =

Passenger rail line in England

Coordinates: 53.99382°N 1.5377°W

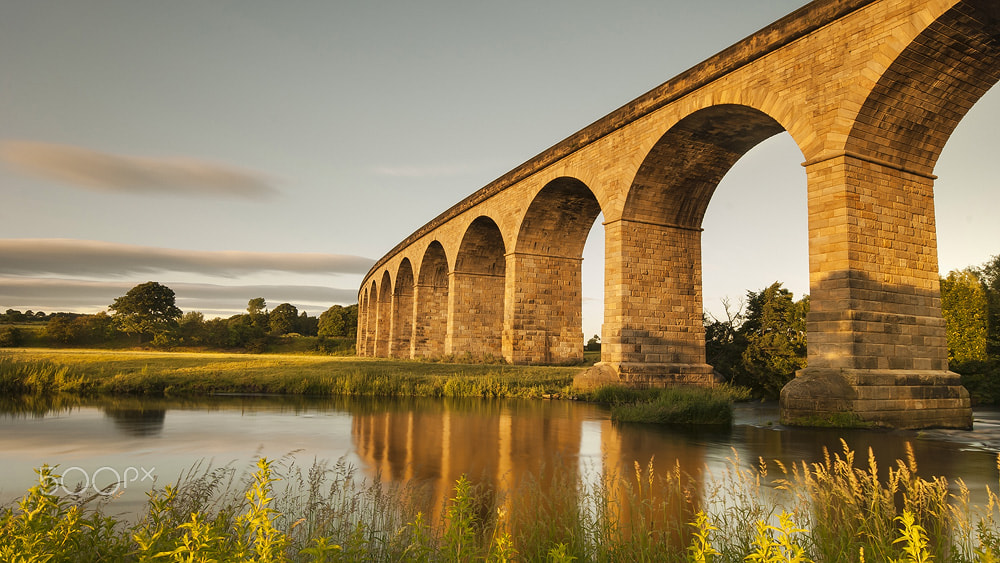
- The Arthington Viaduct near Pool-in-Wharfedale

Overview
- Status: Operational
- Owner: Network Rail
- Locale: West Yorkshire; North Yorkshire
- Termini: Leeds; York
- Stations: 14

Service
- Type: Heavy rail
- System: National Rail
- Operator(s): Northern; London North Eastern Railway
- Depot: Neville Hill
- Rolling stock: Class 150 Sprinter; Class 155 Super Sprinter; Class 158 Express Sprinter; Class 170 Turbostar; Class 800 Azuma

History
- Opened: 1848

Technical
- Line length: 39-mile (62 km)
- Track gauge: 4 ft 8 1/2 in (1,435 mm) standard gauge
Route map
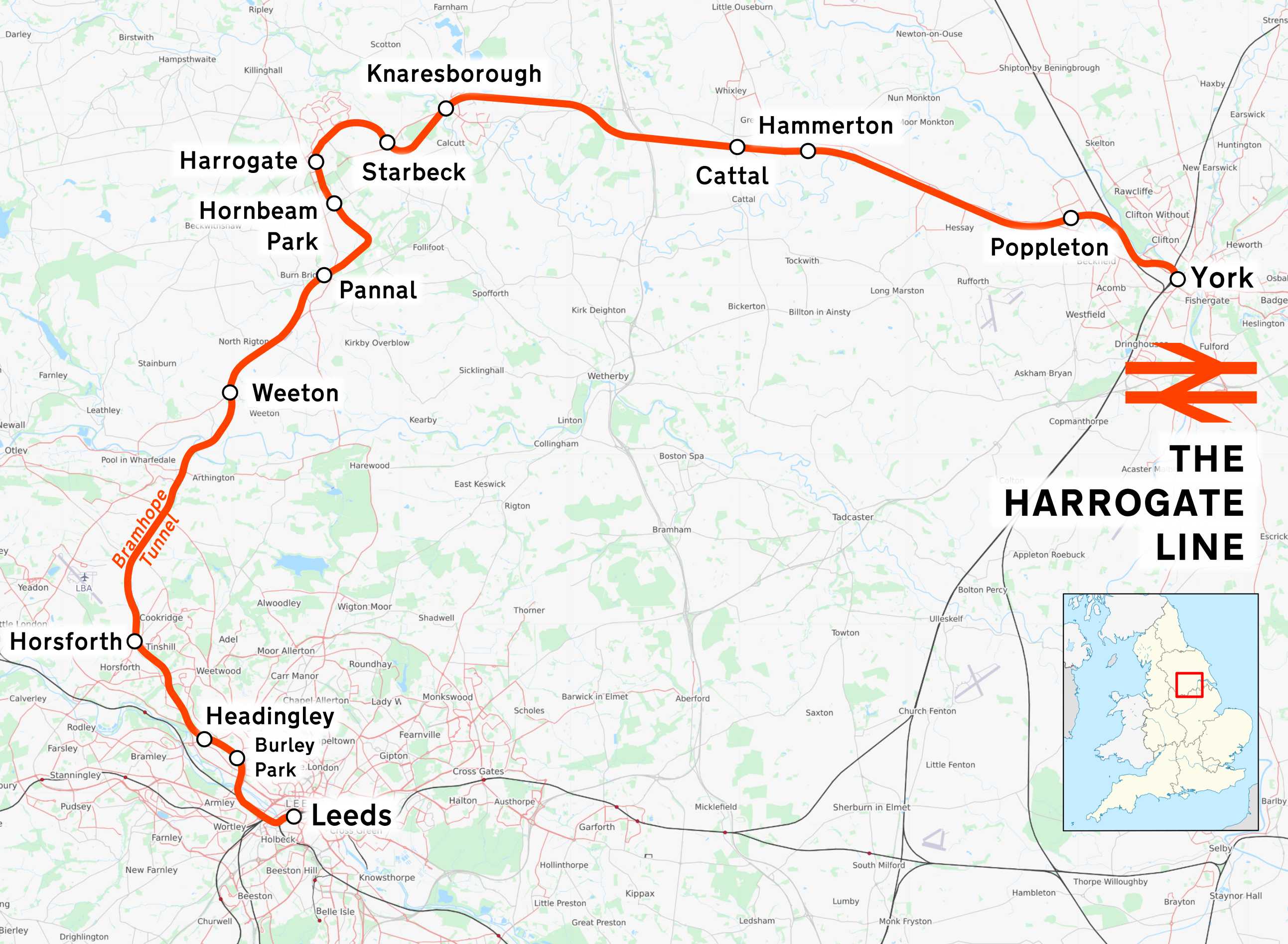
(Click to expand)

The Harrogate line is a passenger rail line through parts of North Yorkshire and the West Yorkshire area of northern England connecting Leeds to York by way of Harrogate and Knaresborough. Service on the line is operated by Northern, with a few additional workings by London North Eastern Railway starting and terminating at Harrogate. West Yorkshire Metro's bus and rail MetroCard ticket is available for journeys between Leeds and Harrogate.

== Route ==
=== History ===
The routes over which the Harrogate line trains now run were opened in 1848 by two of the railways which came to be part of the North Eastern Railway: the Leeds Northern Railway and the East and West Yorkshire Junction Railway. At the time of the 1923 Grouping the Harrogate area formed the junction for five routes: the main line was that of the Leeds-Northallerton railway; the other lines were to:

- Pateley Bridge;
- Pilmoor on the East Coast Main Line, the junction for the line to York (the only remaining section open)
- Wetherby, the junction with the Cross Gates–Wetherby line;
- Church Fenton, terminus of the Harrogate–Church Fenton line

The Leeds station at the time was Leeds Central station, jointly owned by the NER and the Lancashire and Yorkshire Railway.

The line terminated in Harrogate at the Brunswick station which was opened in 1848 but closed in 1862 when a new and more central station was opened.

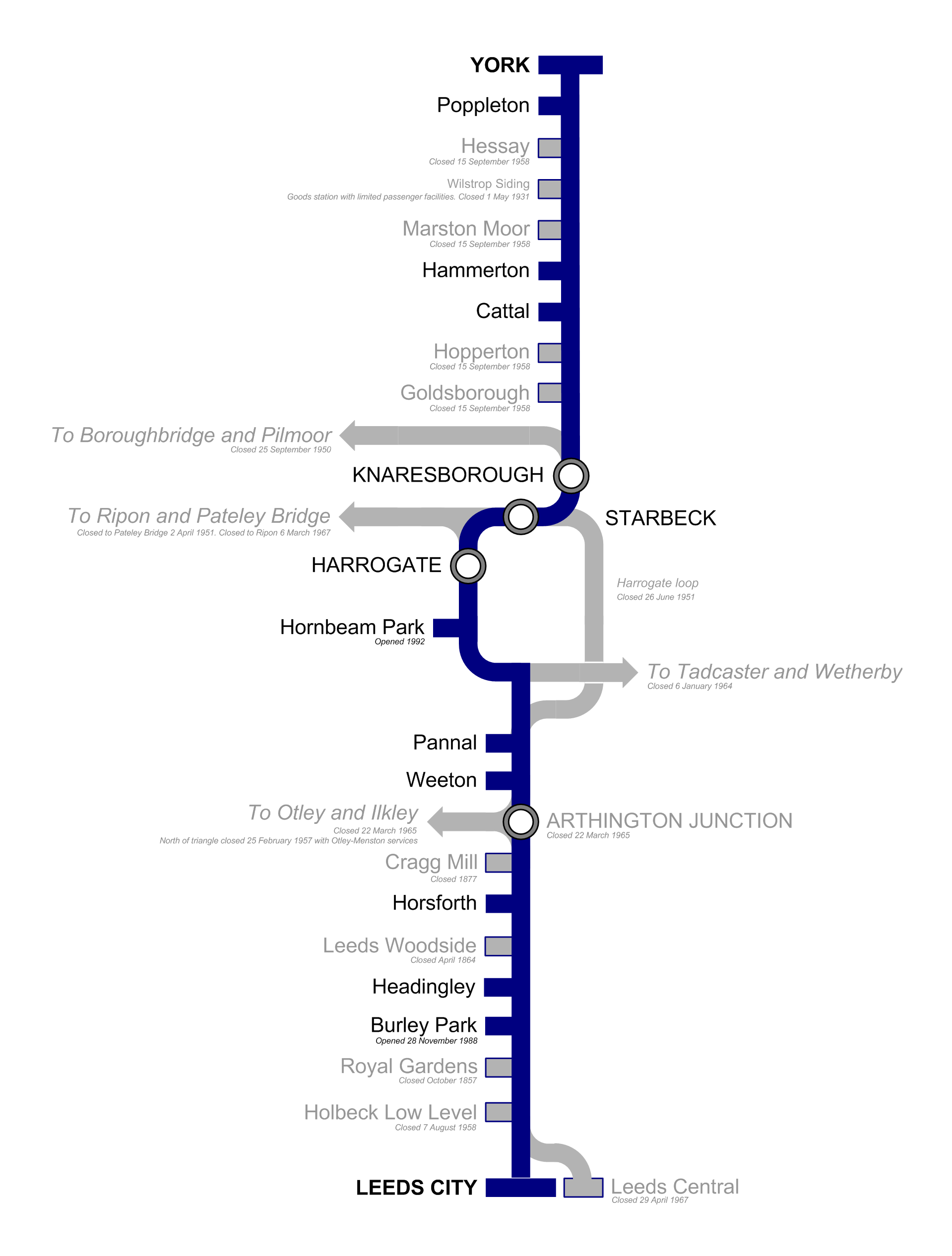
Schematic diagram of the Harrogate line including closed stations and branch lines

=== Special services ===
In addition to the regular services on the Harrogate line, there is occasionally an increased service which runs prior to and after a major event on at Headingley Stadium such as an international cricket test match. The services run between Leeds and Horsforth stations to cater for a large usage at Headingley and Burley Park railway stations. Extra services have also been run on the Harrogate line for the Great Yorkshire Show.

In July 2014, the Tour de France Grand Depart 2014 was held in Yorkshire with stage 1 from Leeds to Harrogate and thousands of spectators were expected. Extra trains were operated in this occasion. In addition to the local trains which were run at increased capacity, two locomotive hauled services ran between Leeds and Harrogate during the day.

=== Trains ===
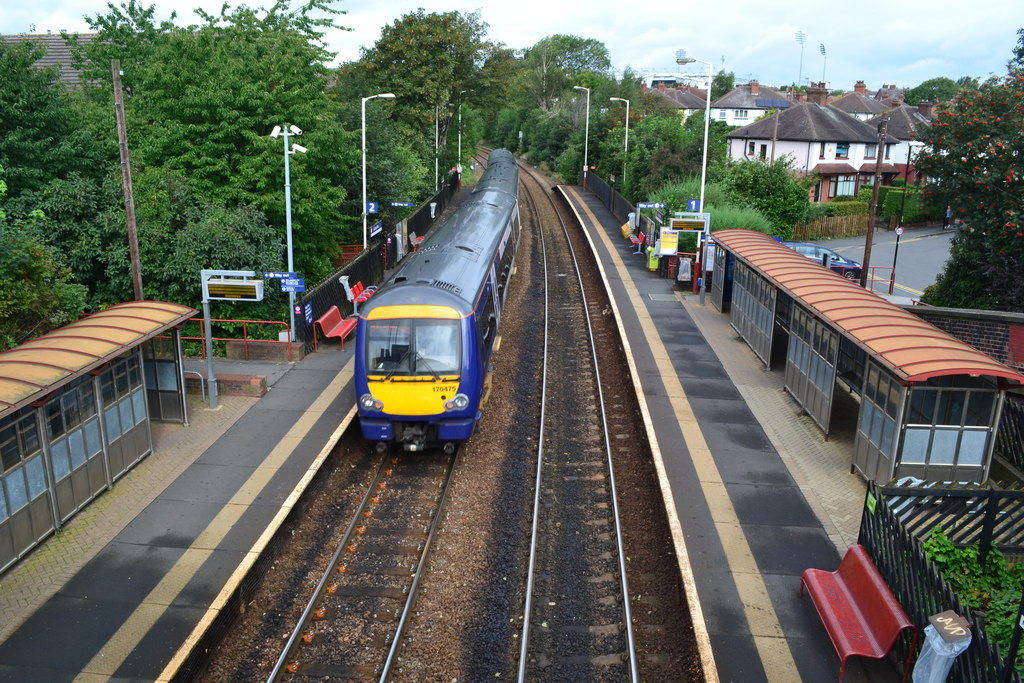
Class 170 at Burley Park station, 2019

The route is served by Northern Trains rolling stock; the most common seen on the line is the Class 170 Turbostar, and Class 150 Sprinters, Class 155 Super Sprinters and Class 158 Express Sprinters often make appearances on the line as well. London North Eastern Railway services use the Class 800 Azuma.

== Future ==
In July 2011, Harrogate Chamber of Commerce proposed electrifying the line with 750 V DC third rail, using D Stock of the London Underground, to substantially increase capacity. The D stock's replacement by S Stock on the District line in 2015 has made them available for other locations. It is proposed that the stock will be converted to use the bottom-contact third rail system. The scheme never gained support from Metro, Northern Rail or National Rail, generally overhead electrification is favoured and is the only method used in the region. Furthermore, the D stock is older than current stock using the line and runs on a fourth rail system, although D Stock units have successfully been converted to 3rd rail operation as Class 484s.

Several new stations have also been proposed, including at Flaxby and Knaresborough East. In November 2013 Rail Magazine reported on plans for the line to be electrified at 25 kV AC overhead power lines which could be in use by 2019. This would mean that there would be two electric lines to York from Leeds, the other being Leeds to York via Cross Gates which will soon be electrified.

On 5 March 2015, the Harrogate line, amongst others in the area including the Leeds–Bradford Interchange–Halifax line, the Selby–Hull line and the Northallerton–Middlesbrough line were named top priority for electrification; with an estimated cost for the Harrogate line of £93 million with a projected cost-benefit ratio of 1/3.60. No date has been set however.

From December 2017, additional services on Sundays began with an extra hourly service from Leeds to Knaresborough during the day. This means trains between Knaresborough/Harrogate and Leeds are now every 30 minutes during the daytime on Sundays. Funding has been secured for signalling and infrastructure upgrades on the section of line between Knaresborough and York. This will allow an enhanced passenger service of two trains per hour. However, the proposal to re-open Goldsborough railway station to serve a new housing estate, would jeopardise reliable timings on the train service. The £13 million scheme will be carried out over the summer and autumn of 2020 with improved signalling. This will allow two services an hour between York, Knaresborough and Harrogate.

In December 2019, London North Eastern Railway (LNER), intend to increase their one train a day, between Harrogate and London King's Cross, to six trains each way per day, including weekends. The service will be suitable for an increase in service pattern due to LNER using its bi-mode class 800 Azuma trains that would have previously terminated at Leeds. A siding at the northern end of Harrogate station has been brought back into use to enable the trains to reverse direction.

Since 1 March 2020 services have been directly operated by the Department for Transport (DfT) under the brand name Northern Trains, with an objective of "stabilising performance and restoring reliability for passengers".

== The Line to Ripon ==
The city was previously served by Ripon railway station on the Leeds–Northallerton line that ran between Leeds and Northallerton. It was once part of the North Eastern Railway and then LNER.

The Ripon line was closed to passengers on 6 March 1967 and to freight on 5 September 1969 as part of the wider Beeching Axe, despite a vigorous campaign by local campaigners, including the city's MP. Today much of the route of the line through the city is now a relief road and although the former station still stands, it is now surrounded by a new housing development. The issue remains a significant one in local politics and there are movements wanting to restore the line. Reports suggest the reopening of a line between Ripon and Harrogate railway station would be economically viable, costing £40 million and could initially attract 1,200 passengers a day, rising to 2,700. Campaigners call on MPs to restore Ripon railway link.

In the former North Yorkshire County Council's 'A Strategic Transport Prospectus for North Yorkshire', they propose to build an entirely new railway between Leeds, Harrogate and Ripon which would have a junction with the East Coast Main Line north of Northallerton station. This would enable 125 mph (201 km/h) running, reduce journey times and provide an alternative route when the current Leeds to York to Northallerton section is closed.
