= Bramhope Tunnel =

Railway tunnel in West Yorkshire, England

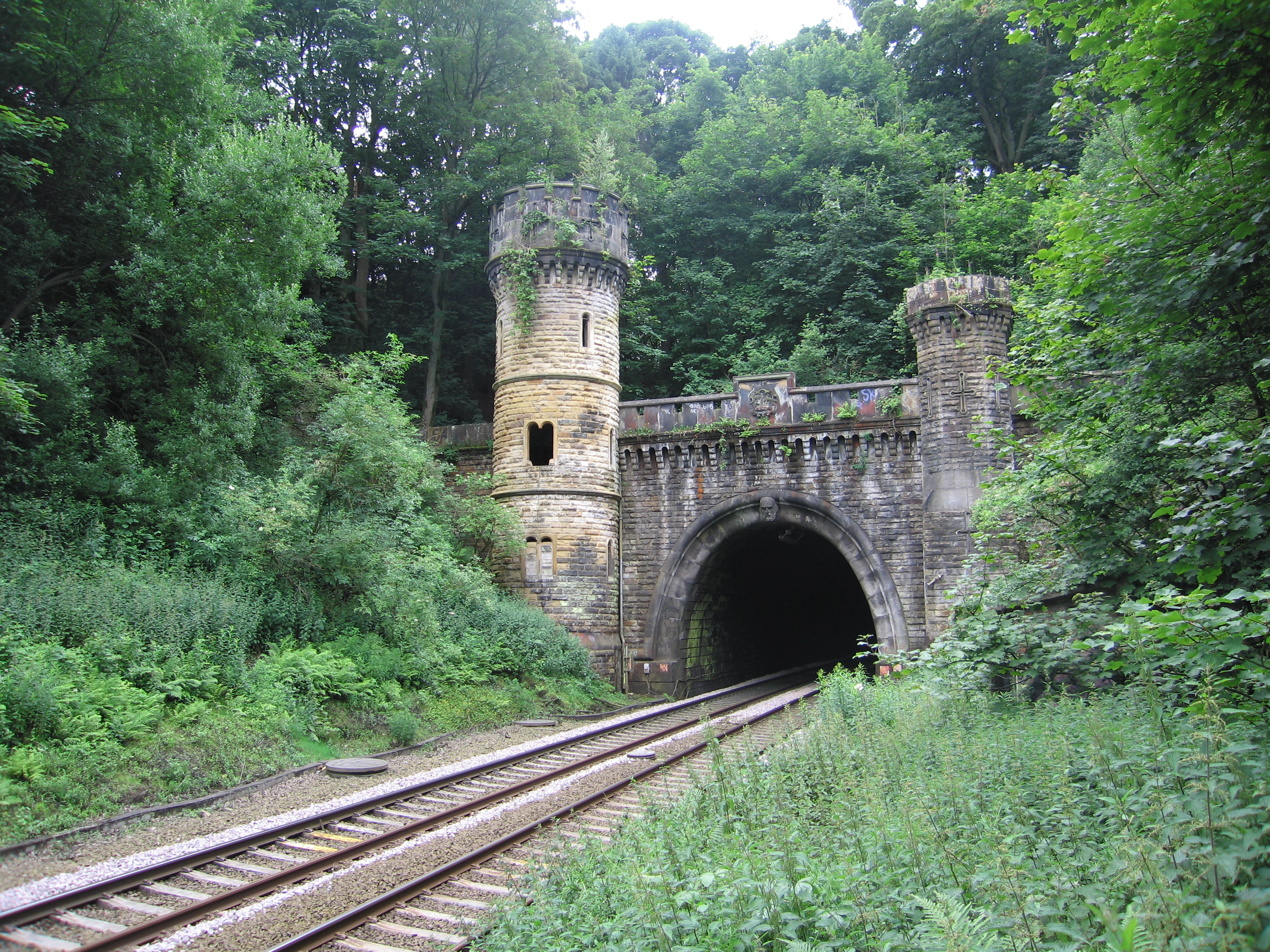
- Bramhope Tunnel north portal
- Interactive map of Bramhope Tunnel

Overview
- Line: Harrogate Line
- Location: Horsforth–Weeton
- Coordinates: 53°53′23″N 1°36′45″W

Operation
- Work began: 1845
- Opened: 1849
- Owner: Network Rail
- Operator: Northern

Technical
- Length: 2.138 miles (3.441 km)
- Track gauge: Standard gauge; double track
- Operating speed: 60 miles per hour (97 km/h)
- Tunnel clearance: 25 feet (7.6 m)
- Grade: 1 in 94 (0.01%)

Bramhope Tunnel is on the Harrogate Line between Horsforth station and the Arthington Viaduct in West Yorkshire, England. Services through the railway tunnel are operated mainly by Northern. The tunnel was constructed during 1845–1849 by the Leeds and Thirsk Railway. It is notable for its 2.138-mile (3.441 km) length and its Grade II listed, crenellated north portal. The deaths of 24 men who were killed during its construction are commemorated in Otley churchyard by a monument that is a replica of the tunnel's north portal.

Thomas Grainger was the engineer for the line and James Bray the contractor. Two sighting towers were erected and 20 shafts sunk along the tunnel's line. Men excavated rock from the shaft faces until the shafts were connected and the tunnel was completed in 1848. Thousands of navvies lived locally in temporary bothies with their families, and worked in dangerous and wet conditions to facilitate the grand opening in 1849.

== History ==
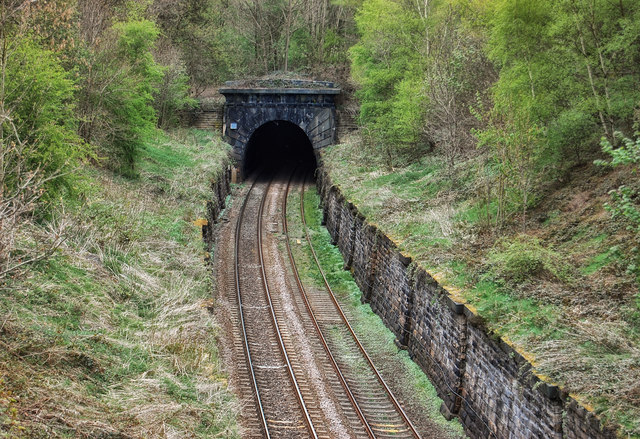
South portal in 2009

In the mid-1840s Railway Mania was taking hold and railway companies competed with each other to bring forward schemes to access Wharfedale. Most of these schemes did not come to fruition but the Leeds and Thirsk Railway Company's proposal, a counter to George Hudson's "megalomania", to build a line from Leeds to Thirsk received approval in the Leeds and Thirsk Railway Act 1845 (8 & 9 Vict. c. civ). The line would open up trade in Leeds to the North East and access lower Wharfedale. Among the several major obstacles on the route was the ridge between Airedale and Wharfedale requiring a long tunnel between Horsforth and Arthington under Bramhope village. The company appointed Thomas Grainger as engineer for the project and James Bray was the contractor for the Bramhope contract. Bray, of Black Bull Street in Leeds, was originally a brass and iron founder.

Water was taken at first from the town well opposite St Giles' Church, but the excessive demand diminished the supply and spoiled its quality. The tunnellers' water was then pumped from a site near the Dyneley Arms crossroads. At the same time the tunnel was draining away the local farmers' natural water supply and the source of Bramhope town well. Litigation on this subject continued for some years. To mitigate the situation, a public waterworks scheme with a reservoir and an aqueduct was proposed but not implemented.

The tunnel was planned to be 3,344 yards in length but during construction it was extended to 3,743 yards. The cost of building the whole line was estimated to be £800,000 but the final total rose to £2,150,313 (equivalent to £236,220,000 in 2025) by 1849 because of costs incurred for labour, unforeseen extra costs for tunnelling at Bramhope and work in Leeds and on the Arthington Viaduct. At a shareholders meeting in September 1848 it was reported that only 100 yards of new ground were left to be penetrated and Bray stated it would be possible to run a locomotive through the tunnel in the following May.

Work on the tunnel cost the lives of 24 men. The grand opening was 9 July 1849, a week later than intended, but the first train, full of Leeds and Thirsk railway officials, pulled by Bray's locomotive Stephenson, went through a few weeks earlier on 31 May. The railway was opened to the public on 10 July. When built it was the third-longest rail tunnel in the country. The Leeds and Thirsk Company was renamed the Leeds Northern Railway shortly after the line was completed.

Since 2016 most services on the line through the tunnel are operated by the Northern franchise on behalf of Rail North which represents the local transport authorities in West and North Yorkshire and other parts of the North of England.

== Construction ==
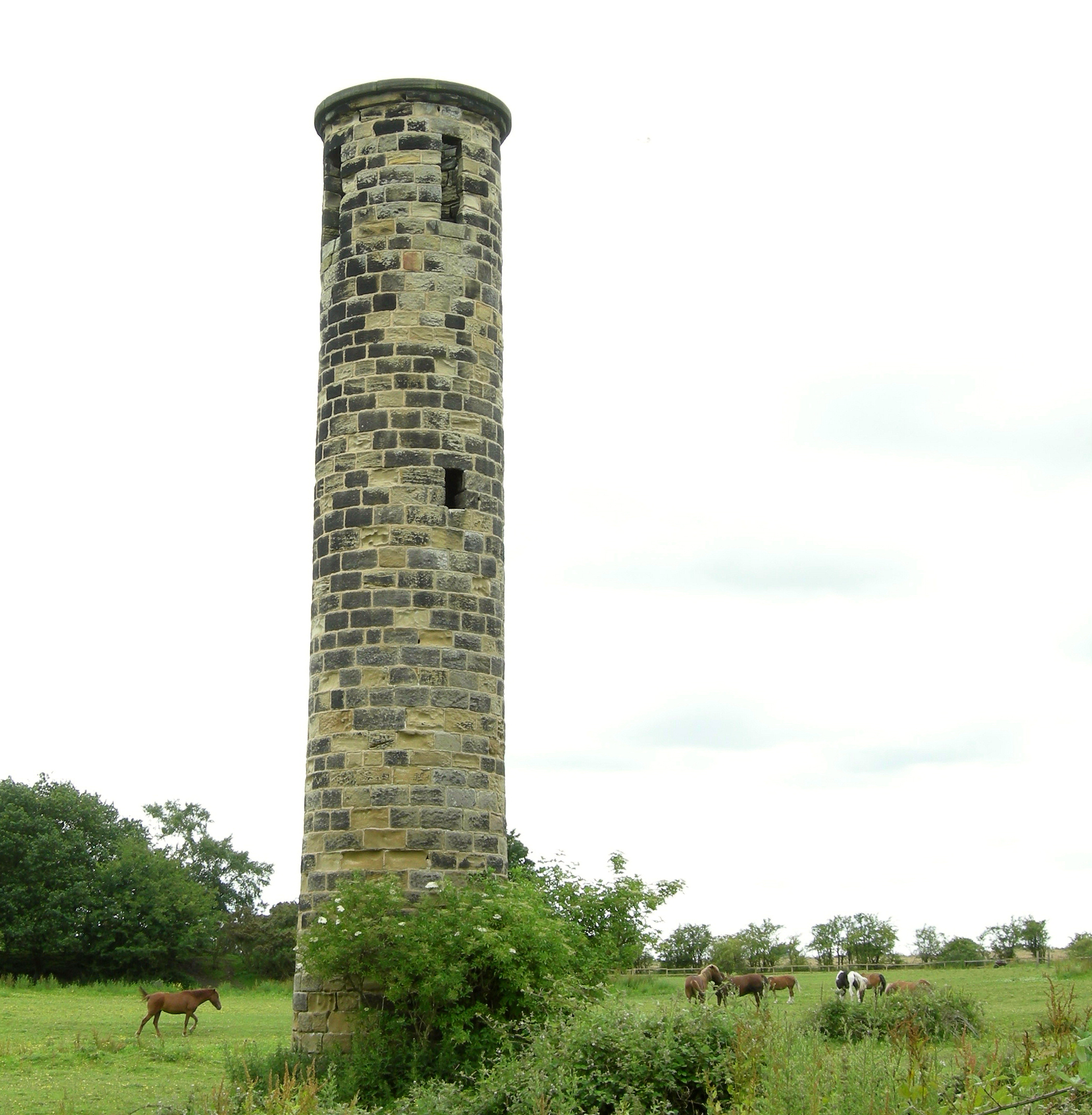
Sighting tower with horses showing relative height

Two sighting towers were built at a cost of £140 for the surveyors to keep the line true, then from 20 October 1845 twenty shafts were sunk to enable tunnelling. Tunnelling started after the foundation stone was laid at the bottom of No. 1 airshaft in July 1846. The separate working faces were joined into a single tunnel on 27 November 1848, and work was completed in summer 1849.

The four shafts retained for ventilation cost £35,000. The shaft north of Otley Road is 240 feet deep, the one behind Park House is 239 feet, Camp House Farm 204 feet and the one nearest to Horsforth station is 175 feet deep. The ventilation shafts measure 40 feet (12 m) by 30 feet (9.1 m) – wider than the tunnel. The finished tunnel is 2 miles, 243 yd or 2.138 miles (3.441 km) long; 25.5 feet (7.8 m) wide by 25 feet (7.6 m) high. It is a double track tunnel, with a gradient of 1 in 94 (0.01%) falling from just north of Horsforth station towards Arthington. The line enters and leaves the tunnel on a curve.

=== Working conditions ===
Work was carried out by up to 2,300 navvies and 400 horses were brought in for the work. The workforce included 188 quarrymen, 102 stonemasons, 732 tunnel men, 738 labourers and 18 carpenters. Each day around 2150 wagon loads of rock and earth was removed from the workings to be tipped on the Wharfe embankment leading to the Arthington Viaduct.

Men were lowered by bucket down the airshafts to dig by candlelight. They were paid £1.50 per week to shovel 20 tons (20.32 tonnes) of rock and earth per 12–hour shift, seven days a week. Conditions were constantly wet, with foul air and gunpowder fumes and the danger of roof–collapse. The tunnel cuts through hard sandstone, shale and clay, and there are seven major faults in the rock near the centre point. The work was dangerous because the rock at the Horsforth end was difficult to blast, and there was frequent flooding and subsidence. About 1,563,480,000 gallons (7,107,580,080 litres) of water were pumped out of the workings between 1845 and 1849. Metal sheets had to be used to divert water inside the tunnel.

=== Living conditions ===
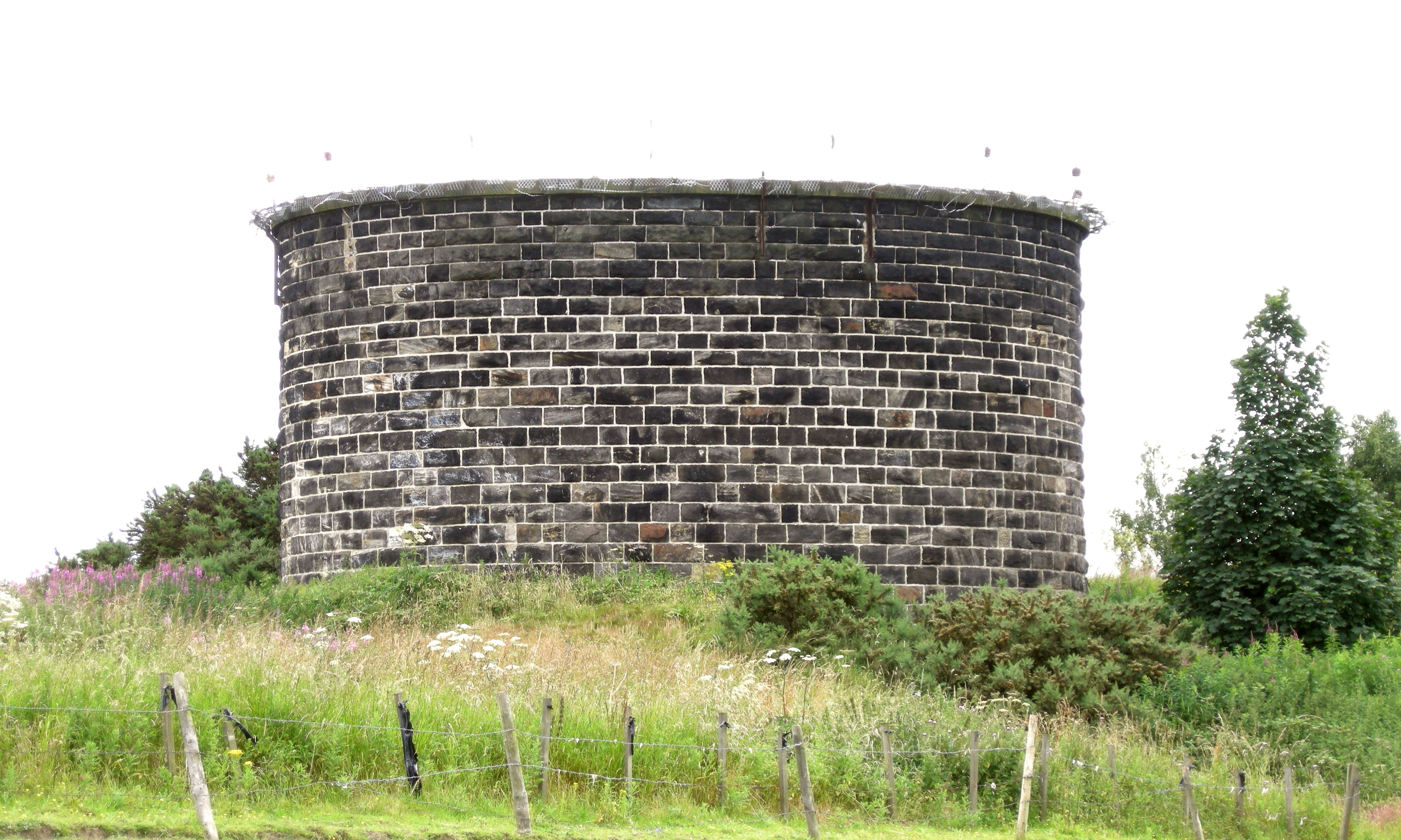
Navvies lived in bothies along the line of the tunnel, near the ventilation shafts

For four years the workmen, some of whom brought their families, lived in 300 temporary wooden bothies either in a field alongside the offices and workshops, opposite the cemetery, or elsewhere along the line of the tunnel. Day– and night–shift workers lived up to 17 per hut taking turns to use the beds in unsanitary conditions.

Workers' children overwhelmed the village school. It had been built by the township copyholders and freeholders on Eastgate in 1790. There were originally 30 children but their number increased fourfold, and with a grant of £100 from the railway company the school building was enlarged to accommodate them. The workers and their families used St Ronan's Methodist Chapel in Bramhope and the Methodist Chapel at Pool-in-Wharfedale. The Leeds Mission spread bibles and tracts to families who lived in the bothies.

Many navvies had been farm labourers from the Yorkshire Dales, North East England and the Fens, or had come for work from Scotland and Ireland. Drunkenness and fighting was such that Jos Midgeley, a railway police inspector, was hired for £1.25 per week to keep order. At one time he was attacked by a group of men, and at Wescoe Hill, two miles away on the opposite side of the River Wharfe, a riot occurred when the contractors tried to cut off the beer supply to keep the men sober enough to work.

== What is visible today ==
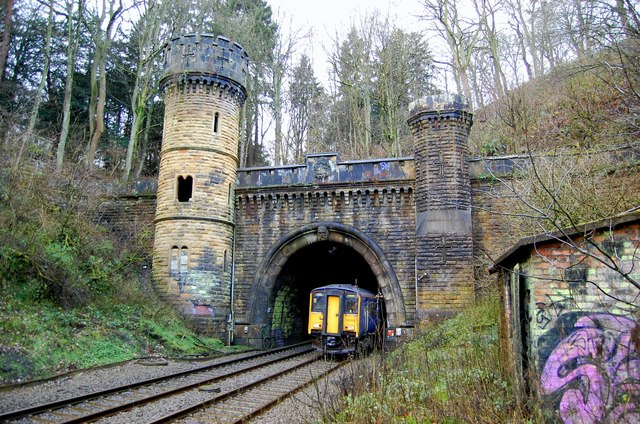
North portal in 2007

Four of the twenty construction shafts were retained as ventilation shafts. One of the two sighting towers, a tall, cylindrical sandstone structure, two metres in diameter with four vertical slits near the top and flat coping stones is still standing in the field opposite Bramhope cemetery. The other one, now demolished, was behind Dyneley Hall. About 250,000 cubic yards (190,000 m^{3}) of sandstone and shale spoil was tipped close to the ventilation shafts along the line of the tunnel. One of the tips is in an area around the scout hut north of Otley Road through to the Knoll on the junction of Eastgate and Parklands Gate, another is south of Breary Lane, one is in a field opposite the cemetery and another near None Go Bye Farm.

Access to the north portal was possible until around 2020 but it had to be fenced off by Network Rail due to various issues, including vandalism. The entrance can be seen at a distance from the public footpath that runs alongside the line. This path winds its way down towards Arthington and its viaduct, which carries the line over the River Wharfe and onwards to Harrogate.

The sandstone sighting tower, the north and south portals and the retaining walls to the south portal are all Grade II listed structures. The portals are on Network Rail land with no public access. (Note: The north portal can be seen at a distance from the nearby public footpath, and glimpsed from the Leeds–bound train when entering the tunnel. The south portal has no public access as it is in a cutting with no easy viewing point, and is difficult to glimpse from a train, which can now go through at 60 miles per hour (97 km/h).) The southern portal at the Horsforth end is a plain sandstone horseshoe-shaped arch with rusticated voussoirs below a cornice and a parapet. It is approached by a slightly curved 300-metre cutting faced with sandstone retaining walls. They have a concave batter, slightly projecting piers at regular intervals and are topped with square coping stones.

During the Railway Mania period in which the tunnel was constructed, the powerful landowners often had a strong influence on the railways being built on their land, and it was due to the demands of William Rhodes of the adjoining Bramhope and Creskeld Halls that the north portal is to an intricate Gothic revival castellated design; it was not simply an entrance and exit for trains, but a fantasy medieval gatehouse garden feature. After it was finished, was lived in for a while by railway workers. It is built of rock–faced sandstone and has three side towers with turrets. The keystone on its horseshoe–shaped archway features a portrait of a bearded man thought to be Rhodes. Its crenellated parapet has a carved cartouche in the centre featuring a wheatsheaf, fleece and fish – the heraldic device of the Leeds and Thirsk Railway.

== Incidents ==
A southbound passenger train and a pilot engine left Arthington station on 19 September 1854 heading for Leeds. A pilot engine had travelled northbound through the tunnel earlier the same day with no problems but this time the train ran into a pile of stone debris and was derailed when it was three-quarters of the way into the tunnel. The debris was from a roof fall that affected both tracks. The train engine collided with the pilot engine tender causing considerable damage.

Trains have been cancelled or delayed because of flooding in the tunnel. Water still runs fast into the tunnel, and in the 1960s a train was derailed by a 3-ton (3.3 tonne) icicle.

== Repairs ==
Major repair work was done in 2003 and 2006, when the Victorian drainage culvert was replaced and the track lowered to allow access for larger passenger and freight stock at a cost of £10 million. The 16 closed airshafts were deteriorating and had to be re-capped. In 2003 the excavated material from the works was recycled to shore up the railway embankment near Castley.

== Human cost ==
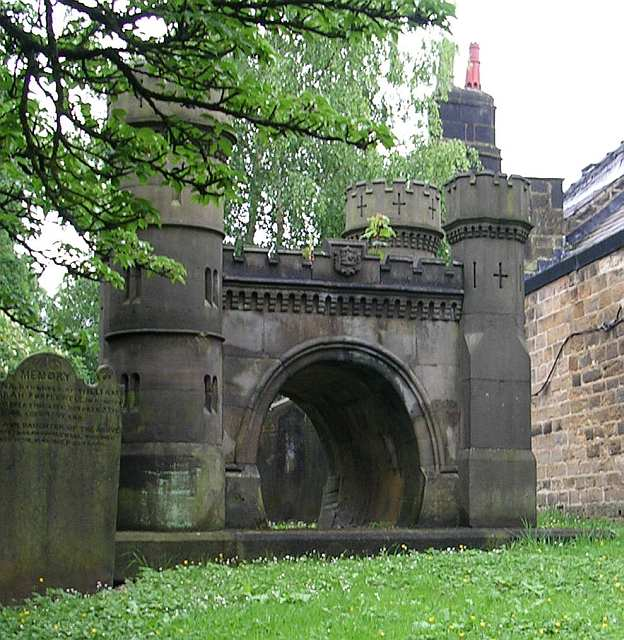
Bramhope Tunnel memorial, All Saints' Church churchyard, Otley

Records of death and injury were kept from 1847 to 1849, and grants were made to the Leeds Infirmary and a special sprung handcart was provided to transport the injured to hospital.

Five men died in 1846, twelve died in 1847 and seven more had died by 1849. The 24 men who died are commemorated in Otley churchyard by a Grade II listed monument in the shape of the north portal. It was erected by the contractor.

The sadness of the harsh conditions of those days is captured by the simple epitaph on the gravestone of James Myers who is buried in the Methodist Cemetery at Yeadon behind the Town Hall. James was a married man just 22 years old who 'died by an accident in the Bramhope Tunnel on the 14th day of April, 1848'. Next to him lies the body of his 3 years old daughter who died two weeks later of some unspecified illness.

== See also ==
- Listed buildings in Bramhope
- Listed buildings in Guiseley and Rawdon
