= Kirkstall Road Viaduct =

Railway viaduct in West Yorkshire, England

Coordinates: 53°48′18″N 1°34′37″W

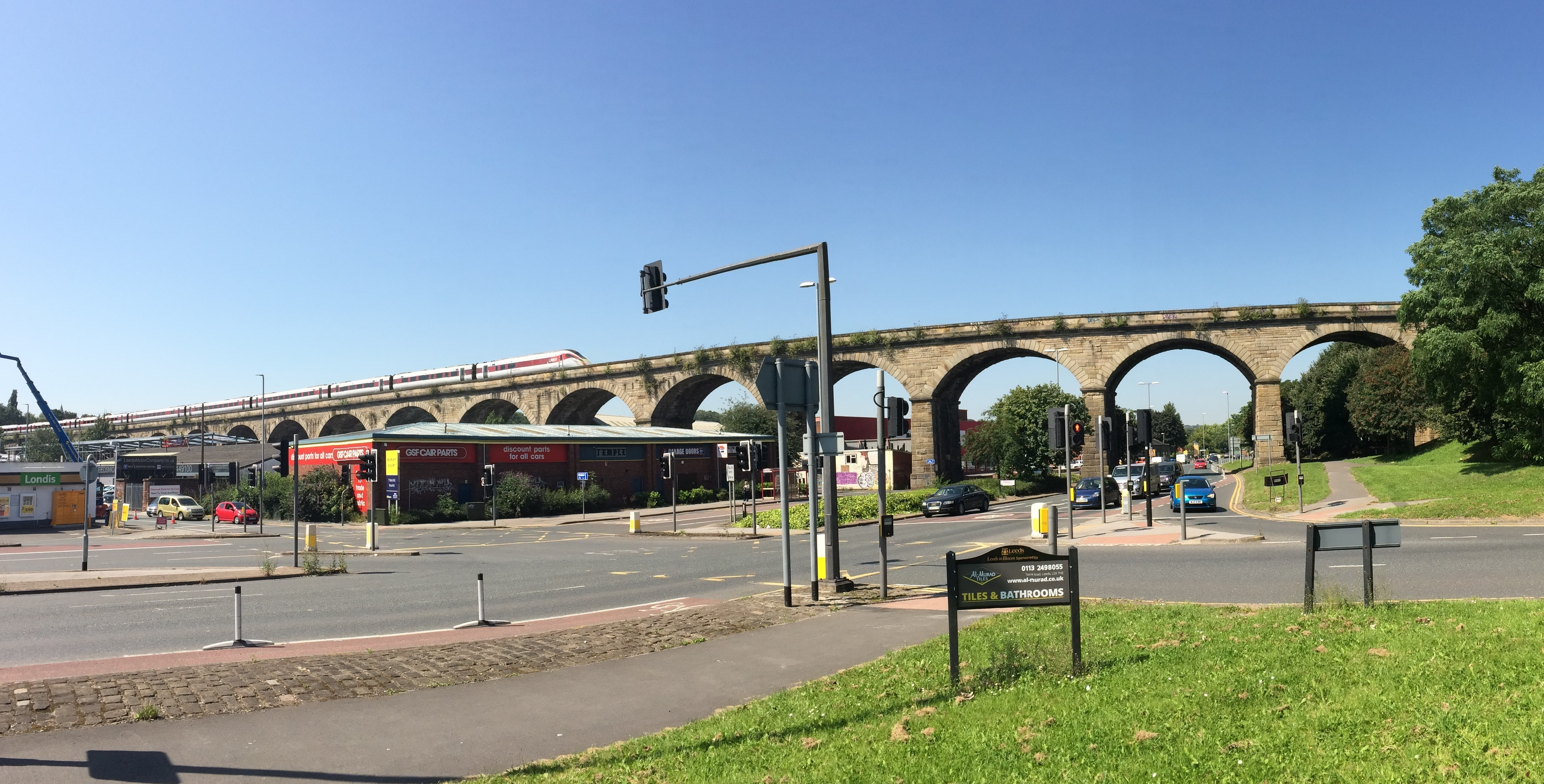
Panorama of the viaduct from the east, over the A65

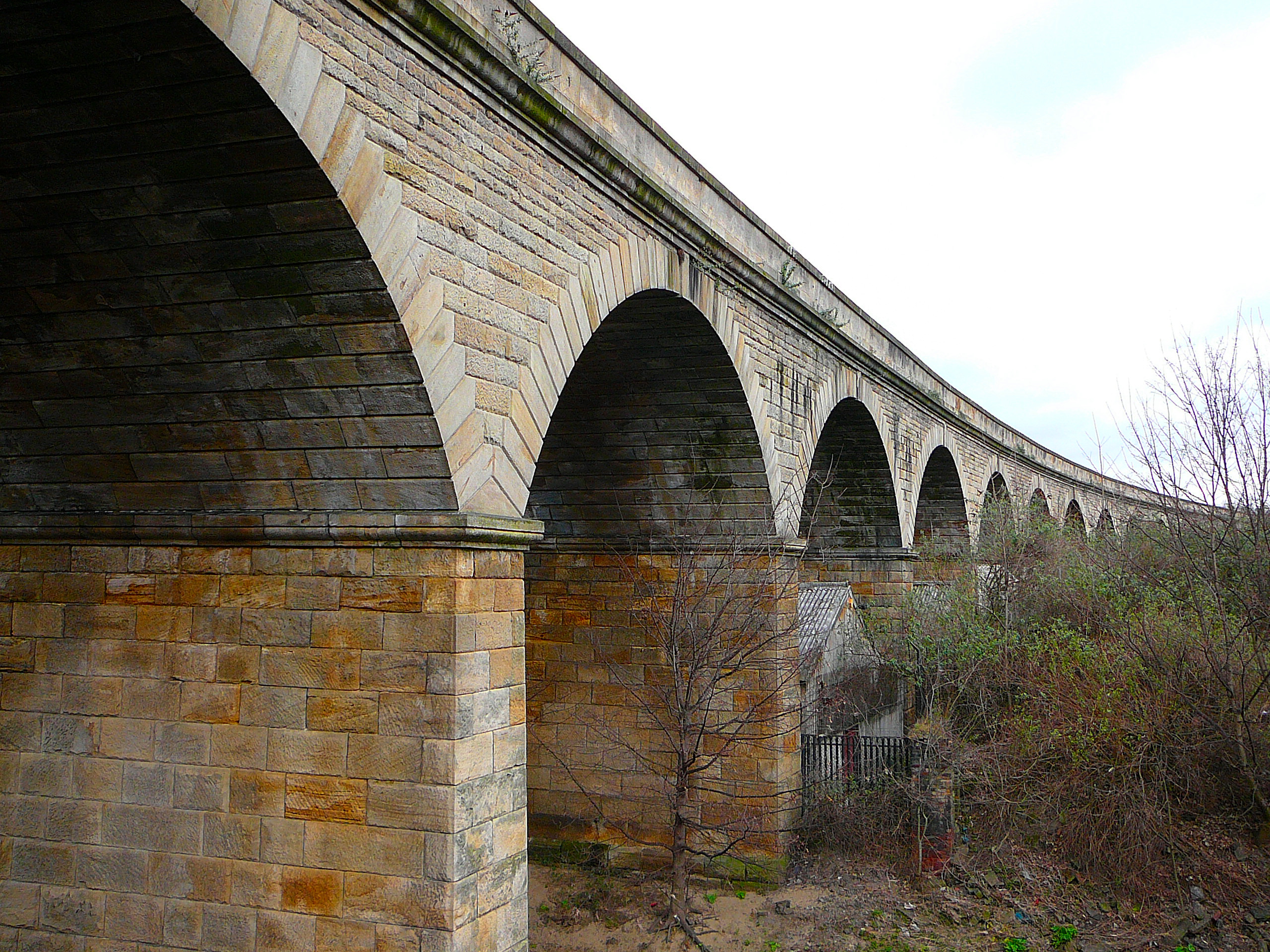
The arches of the viaduct crossing the River Aire

Kirkstall Road Viaduct is a Grade II listed railway viaduct carrying the Harrogate line over the A65 Kirkstall Road, the River Aire, and the Leeds and Liverpool Canal in Burley, Leeds, West Yorkshire. It was built in 1849 by the engineer Thomas Grainger for the Leeds and Thirsk Railway. The viaduct, which is approximately 440 m (0.27 miles), is a significant local landmark due to the wide, shallow nature of the valley it crosses.

In addition to passing over the Aire, canal and road, the viaduct also passed over working class back-to-back accommodation in the river valley. The Kirkstall Viaduct remains in use today, with sections of the former Leeds Northern Railway line linking Leeds and Harrogate and connecting to York. However, its immediate surroundings are mostly 20th century industrial buildings and industrial parks, which replaced the residential back-to-backs.

Grainger supervised the construction of the whole the line from Leeds to Stockton-on-Tees via Harrogate and Thirsk; his design features twenty-one segmental arches on large rusticated piers, with chamfered voussoirs and a moulded cornice and parapet. At its south end, over the canal, is a low elliptical arch. The viaduct used local Bramley Fall sandstone in the form of rock-faced ashlar, the light colour of which is distinctive compared to the many red brick and dark buildings which surrounded it on construction. The viaduct was completed on 23 March 1849 and began operation from 9 July.

Kirkstall Road Viaduct is recorded in the National Heritage List for England as a Grade II listed structure, having been designated on 22 September 1975. Grade II is the lowest of the three grades of listing, and is applied to "buildings that are nationally important and of special interest".

In 2020, as part of the Leeds Flood Alleviation Scheme, works were proposed to build a new flood wall with a hydrophilic seal around a single pier immediately north of the River Aire. This is in response to the floods in the Aire Valley on Boxing Day 2015.
