= Listed buildings in Bramhope =

Bramhope is a civil parish in the metropolitan borough of the City of Leeds, West Yorkshire, England. It contains 20 listed buildings that are recorded in the National Heritage List for England. Of these, one is listed at Grade I, the highest of the three grades, and the others are at Grade II, the lowest grade. The parish contains the village of Bramhope and the surrounding countryside. Of the listed buildings, nine are mileposts, and the others include houses, farmhouses and farm buildings, a chapel and a church, the north portal of Bramhope Tunnel and a sighting tower used in the construction of the tunnel, and a gazebo.

== Key ==
Grade	Criteria
I	Buildings of exceptional interest, sometimes considered to be internationally important
II	Buildings of national importance and special interest

== Buildings ==
Name and location	Photograph	Date	Notes	Grade
Puritan Chapel; 53.88794°N 1.62263°W		1649	The chapel is in sandstone with a stone slate roof and a rectangular plan. There is one storey and five bays. It contains segmental-headed doorways with moulded surrounds, and mullioned windows with hollow spandrels. On the west gable end is a bellcote. Inside are box pews, and an octagonal pulpit with sounding boards.	I
1 Church Hill; 53.88561°N 1.62353°W	—	Late 17th century	A farmhouse, later used for other purposes, it is in sandstone, with quoins, a continuous hood mould, and a stone slate roof with coped gables and kneelers. There are two storeys, a single-depth plan, and two bays. The doorway has a chamfered surround, there is an inserted shop window, and the other windows are mullioned, with some mullions removed.	II
Rear portion, Old Manor Farmhouse; 53.88653°N 1.62338°W	—	Late 17th century	A farmhouse, later a private house, it is in sandstone, with quoins, and a slate roof. There are two storeys and two bays. The two doorways have plain surrounds, one has been converted into a window, some of the other windows are square, and the others are mullioned.	II
Barn west of Old Manor Farmhouse; 53.88648°N 1.62367°W	—	1691	The barn is in sandstone, with quoins, and a stone slate roof. There is a U-shaped plan with a main range of three bays and two front outshuts. The barn contains a partly blocked wagon entrance, a blocked doorway, an inserted doorway and window, and an initialled datestone.	II
Weavers Cottage; 53.88507°N 1.62269°W	—	1709	A farmhouse later divided into two, it is in sandstone with quoins, and a stone slate roof with a coped gable on the left. There are two storeys and three bays. On the front, a doorway has been inserted into a previous window, and at the rear are coupled doorways and a datestone. The windows are mullioned with some mullions removed, and over the ground floor openings are moulded cornices.	II
Gazebo; 53.88909°N 1.62022°W	—	18th century	The gazebo in the garden of Westwood is in sandstone, and in Classical style. There are two storeys and a circular plan. In the ground floor is a three-bay colonnade, the columns and antae with moulded caps, and in the upper floor is a colonnade glazed with curved sash windows. Above this is a dentilled cornice and a domed roof with a ball finial. On the west side external steps lead up to a doorway with a Gibbs surround.	II
Manor House; 53.88494°N 1.62327°W	—	Mid 18th century	A sandstone house with quoins, moulded gutter brackets, and a stone slate roof with coped gables and kneelers. There are two storeys, a double-depth plan, and three bays. The central doorway has panelled pilasters and a pediment, to its left is an inserted rectangular bay window, and above is a single-light window. The other windows are mullioned with three lights, containing top-hung casements.	II
Milepost at SE 236 422; 53.87555°N 1.64215°W		18th century (probable)	The milepost is on the north side of Otley Old Road, and is in sandstone. It is in the form of a mounting block, about 0.5 metres (1 ft 8 in) long and 0.5 metres (1 ft 8 in) high. There are three steps on the west side, and partly erased inscriptions on the front and right side.	II
The Hollies; 53.88520°N 1.62405°W	—	Mid to late 18th century	A farmhouse, later a private house, it is in sandstone with quoins, and a stone slate roof with a coped gable on the right. There are two storeys, a double-depth plan, and three bays. The doorway has a plain surround, and the windows are mullioned with two lights.	II
Sighting tower 53.87825°N 1.62515°W		1845 (probable)	The sighting tower was built by the Leeds and Thirsk Railway for the construction of Bramhope Tunnel. It is in sandstone, tall and cylindrical, and about 2 metres (6 ft 7 in) in diameter. The tower contains four narrow vertical-rectangular openings near the top, and a flat coping.	II
North portal, Bramhope Tunnel; 53.88974°N 1.61229°W		1845–49	The tunnel was built for the Leeds and Thirsk Railway and the portal is in Gothic style. It is in sandstone, and consists of a horseshoe arch with a moulded surround, a large keystone, a machicolated cornice, a parapet of slabs, each with a hole, and a central raised panel containing a cartouche. To the left is a large three-stage cylindrical tower with round-headed windows, a machicolated cornice, and an embattled parapet with blind cruciform loops. On the right side is a smaller octagonal turret with corbelled battlements. The flanking quadrant retaining walls end in turrets.	II
Milepost on east corner of junction with Breary Lane at SE 255 430; 53.88306°N 1.61240°W		Mid 19th century	The milepost is in sandstone, about 0.5 metres (1 ft 8 in) high, and has a rectangular section and a rounded top. It is inscribed with the distances to a number of local places.	II
Milepost on east corner of junction with Breary Lane East, at SE 256 430; 53.88317°N 1.61193°W		Mid 19th century	The milepost is in sandstone, about 0.5 metres (1 ft 8 in) high, and has a rectangular section and a segmenally-rounded top. It is inscribed with the distances to a number of local places.	II
Milepost on east corner of junction with Church Hill at SE 249 434; 53.88672°N 1.62274°W		Mid 19th century	The milepost is in sandstone, about 0.5 metres (1 ft 8 in) high, and has a rectangular section and a segmenally-rounded top. It is inscribed with the distances to a number of local places.	II
Milepost on south-east corner of junction with Pool Bank New Road at SE 241 440; 53.89160°N 1.63449°W		Mid 19th century	The milepost is in sandstone, about 1 metre (3 ft 3 in) high, and has a rectangular section and a segmenally-rounded top. It is inscribed with the distances to a number of local places.	II
Milepost on west corner of junction with Creskeld Lane at SE 258 428; 53.88129°N 1.60793°W		Mid 19th century	The milepost is in sandstone, about 0.5 metres (1 ft 8 in) high, and has a rectangular section and a segmenally-rounded top. It is inscribed on both sides with the distances to a number of local places.	II
Milepost at SE 240 439; 53.89106°N 1.63619°W		Late 19th century	The milepost is on the southeast side of Pool Bank New Road (A658 road). It is in sandstone with cast iron cladding and has a triangular plan, a semicircular top, and chamfered sides. The top is inscribed "DUDLEYHILL, KILLINGHALL & HARROGATE ROAD" and "BRAMHOPE" and on the sides are the distances to Bradford, Harrogate and Killinghall.	II
Milepost at SE 253 432; 53.88504°N 1.61654°W		Late 19th century	The milepost is on the north side of Leeds Road (A660 road) in the village of Bramhope. It is in sandstone with cast iron cladding and has a triangular plan, a semicircular top, and chamfered sides. On the top is the distance to London, and on the sides are the distances to Leeds and Otley.	II
Milepost at SE 264 421; 53.87500°N 1.59910°W		Late 19th century	The milepost is on the northeast side of Leeds Road (A660 road) southeast of the village of Bramhope. It is in sandstone with cast iron cladding and has a triangular plan, a semicircular top, and chamfered sides. On the top is the distance to London, and on the sides are the distances to Leeds and Otley.	II
Methodist Church; 53.88526°N 1.62137°W		1895–96	The church was designed by W. J. Morley in Decorated style. It is built in sandstone with a slate roof, and consists of a nave, short north and south transepts, a chancel, and a southwest steeple. The steeple has a three-stage tower with angle buttresses rising to pinnacles, an arched doorway, an octagonal top stage, and an octagonal spire. The front facing the road is gabled, and contains s four-light window with a hood mould, beneath which are four small cusped windows, and to the left is a buttress rising to an octagonal pinnacle with a spirelet.	II
