= Castley =

Village and civil parish in North Yorkshire, England

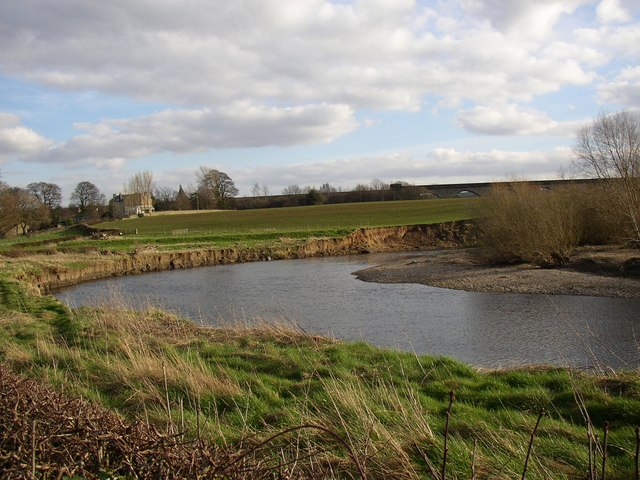
The River Wharfe at Castley

Castley is a village and civil parish in the county of North Yorkshire, England. It lies on a bend in the River Wharfe about 10 miles (16 km) north of the centre of Leeds. The population of the civil parish was estimated at 70 in 2015. The village appears in the Domesday Book as Castleai, a combination of castel, and lēah, meaning the clearing near the fort.

Until 1974 it was part of the West Riding of Yorkshire. From 1974 to 2023 it was part of the Borough of Harrogate, it is now administered by the unitary North Yorkshire Council.

The greater part of the Arthington Viaduct, which carries the Leeds to Harrogate railway line across the Wharfe valley, stands within the parish.

== Listed buildings ==
Castley contains four listed buildings that are recorded in the National Heritage List for England. All the listed buildings are designated at Grade II, the lowest of the three grades, which is applied to "buildings of national importance and special interest". The parish contains the village of Castley and the surrounding countryside, and the listed buildings consist of a house, a boundary stone, a railway viaduct and a milepost.

Name and location	Photograph	Date	Notes
Castley Hall and Manor Farmhouse; 53.90804°N 1.59460°W		c. 1700	The house is in gritstone, with chamfered quoins, a floor band, an eaves cornice, and a stone slate roof with stone coping and shaped kneelers. There are two storeys, a basement and attics, and five bays. The doorway has an eared architrave, a fanlight, and a broken segmental pediment, and most of the windows are sashes. In the basement at the rear, facing the road, are two four-light double-chamfered mullioned windows with hood moulds. On the left return, semicircular steps lead to a central doorway, the windows are cross windows, and in the attic are two blocked oval windows.
Boundary stone 53.90990°N 1.60264°W		1767	The stone marked the boundary of Knaresborough Forest. It is a square stone with a rounded top, inscribed with the date and initials.
Wharfedale Viaduct; 53.90566°N 1.60079°W		1849	The viaduct was built to carry the Leeds to Thirsk Railway over the River Wharfe. It is in sandstone, it has a curved line, and there are 21 semicircular arches with rusticated stepped voussoirs. The viaduct has cutwaters with rounded noses, moulded bands and string courses, and coped parapets.
Milepost; 53.91573°N 1.59974°W		19th century	The milepost on the south side of Harrogate Road (A658 road) is in gritstone with a cast iron front. It has a triangular plan and a rounded head. On the head is inscribed "DUDLEYHILL", "KILLINGHALL" and "HARROGATE ROAD", on the left side is the distance to Bradford, and on the right side the distance to Harrogate.
