= Arthington Viaduct =

Railway viaduct in North Yorkshire, England

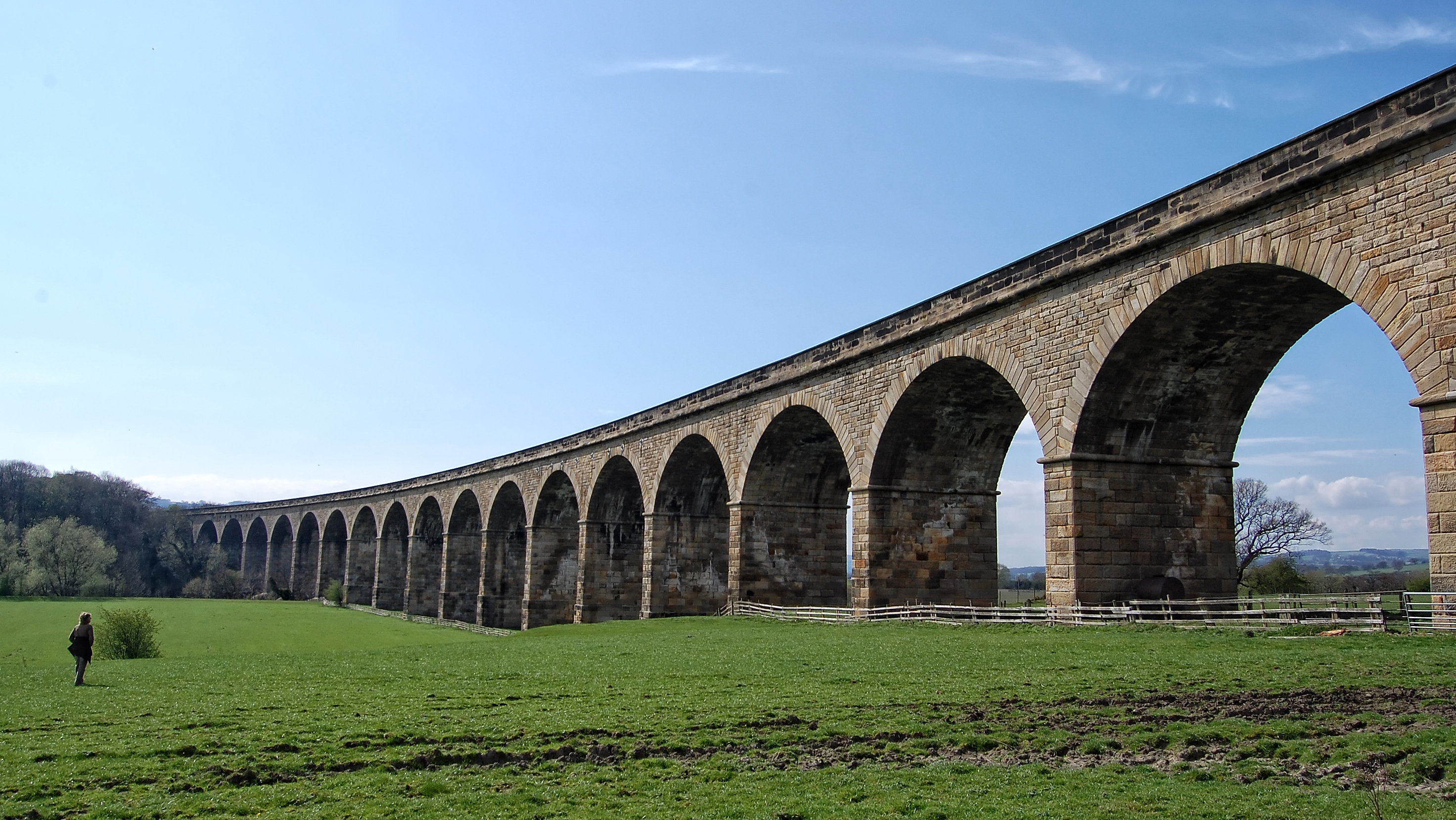
- Arthington Viaduct in 2009 from the North Yorkshire side
- Coordinates: 53°54′20″N 1°36′04″W
- Carries: Harrogate line
- Crosses: River Wharfe
- Locale: Arthington, West Yorkshire/Castley, North Yorkshire
- Other name(s): Castley Viaduct, Wharfedale Viaduct,

Characteristics
- Material: Stone

History
- Opened: 1849; 177 years ago

Location
- Interactive map of Arthington Viaduct

Arthington Viaduct, also known as Castley Viaduct or the Wharfedale Viaduct, is a railway bridge on the border of West Yorkshire and North Yorkshire in northern England. It is in the parishes of Arthington (West Yorkshire) and Castley (North Yorkshire), between Leeds and Harrogate. It is a Grade II listed structure.

== History ==
Construction work on the viaduct began in 1845 and was completed in 1849. It was part of the Leeds and Thirsk Railway's line from Leeds to Stockton-on-Tees via Harrogate, later the Leeds Northern Railway and eventually amalgamated into the North Eastern Railway. Opening of the line was delayed by problems with the nearby Bramhope Tunnel. During the construction of Arthington Viaduct, a worker was killed when one of the arches collapsed. The railway company's chief engineer, Thomas Grainger surveyed the line and designed the structures, including the viaduct. Grainger also built the better-known Knaresborough Viaduct on the same line over the River Nidd.

The viaduct is a Grade II listed building, a status which provides it legal protection. It is listed in both West Yorkshire and North Yorkshire.

== Description ==
The viaduct spans the River Wharfe consists of 21 arches in punched sandstone, each with a span of 60 feet (18 metres) and are carried on tall rectangular piers, rising to a maximum height of 80 feet (24 metres). The piers in the river are fitted with round-nosed cutwaters. At the spring of the arches are moulded impost bands and above them is a string course which runs the length of the bridge. The bridge is crowned with coped parapet. The arches have rusticated, stepped voussoirs and several have circular metal tie plates. The viaduct curves to the north east and has substantial stone abutments at each end. The six southern arches are in the parish of Arthington, West Yorkshire and the remainder in the North Yorkshire village of Castley.

== See also ==
- Listed buildings in Arthington
- Listed buildings in Castley
