= Thomas Grainger =

Scottish civil engineer and surveyor (1794-1852)

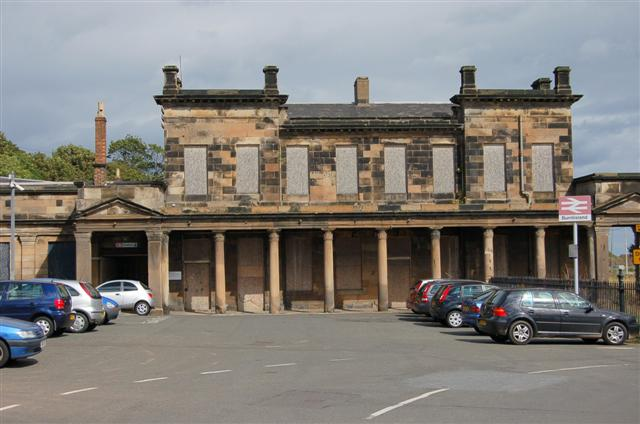
Burntisland railway station

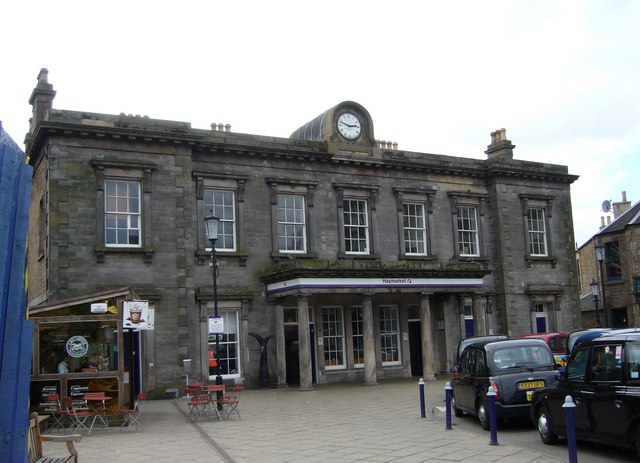
Haymarket Station, Edinburgh

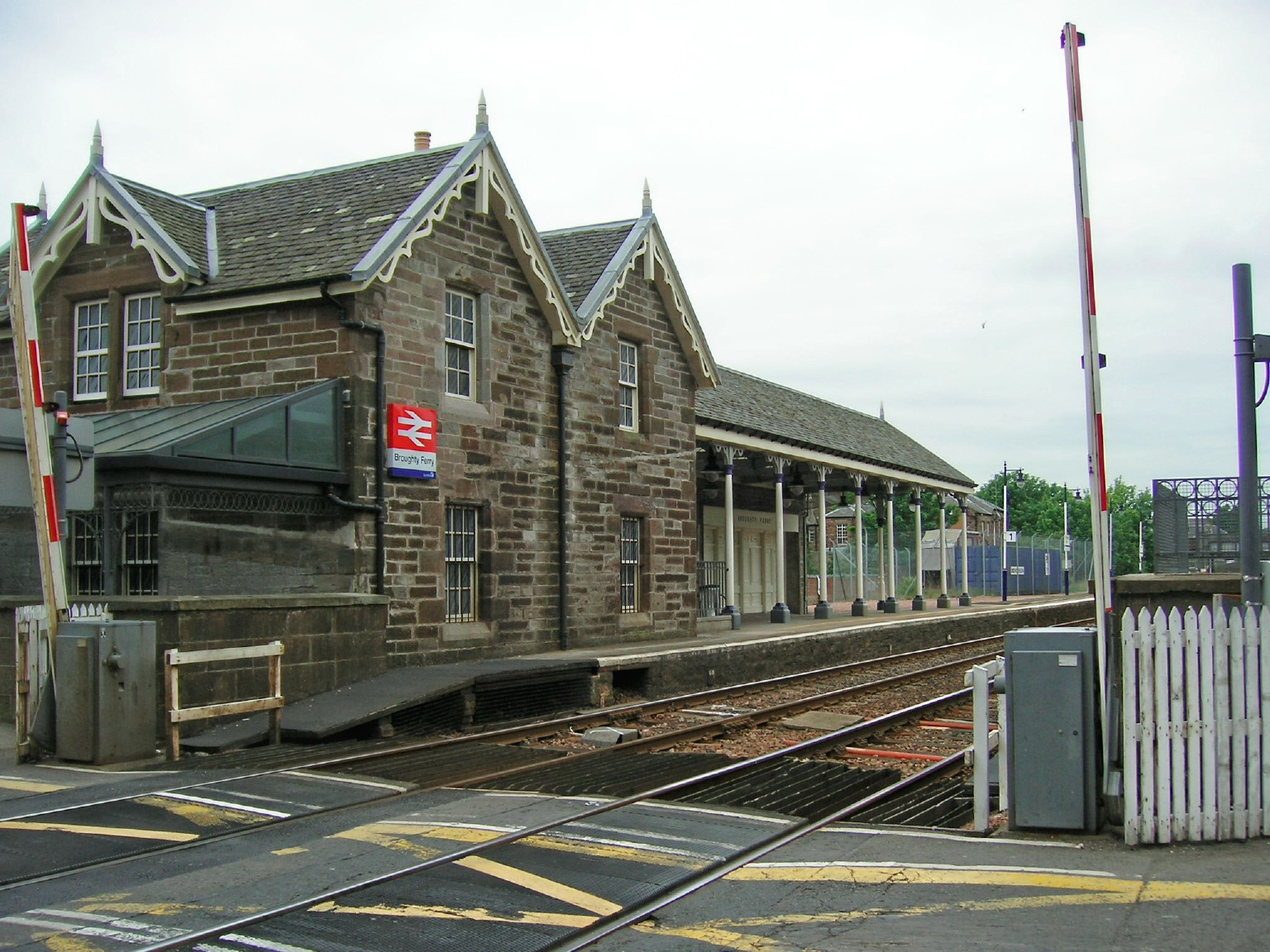
Broughty Ferry Station

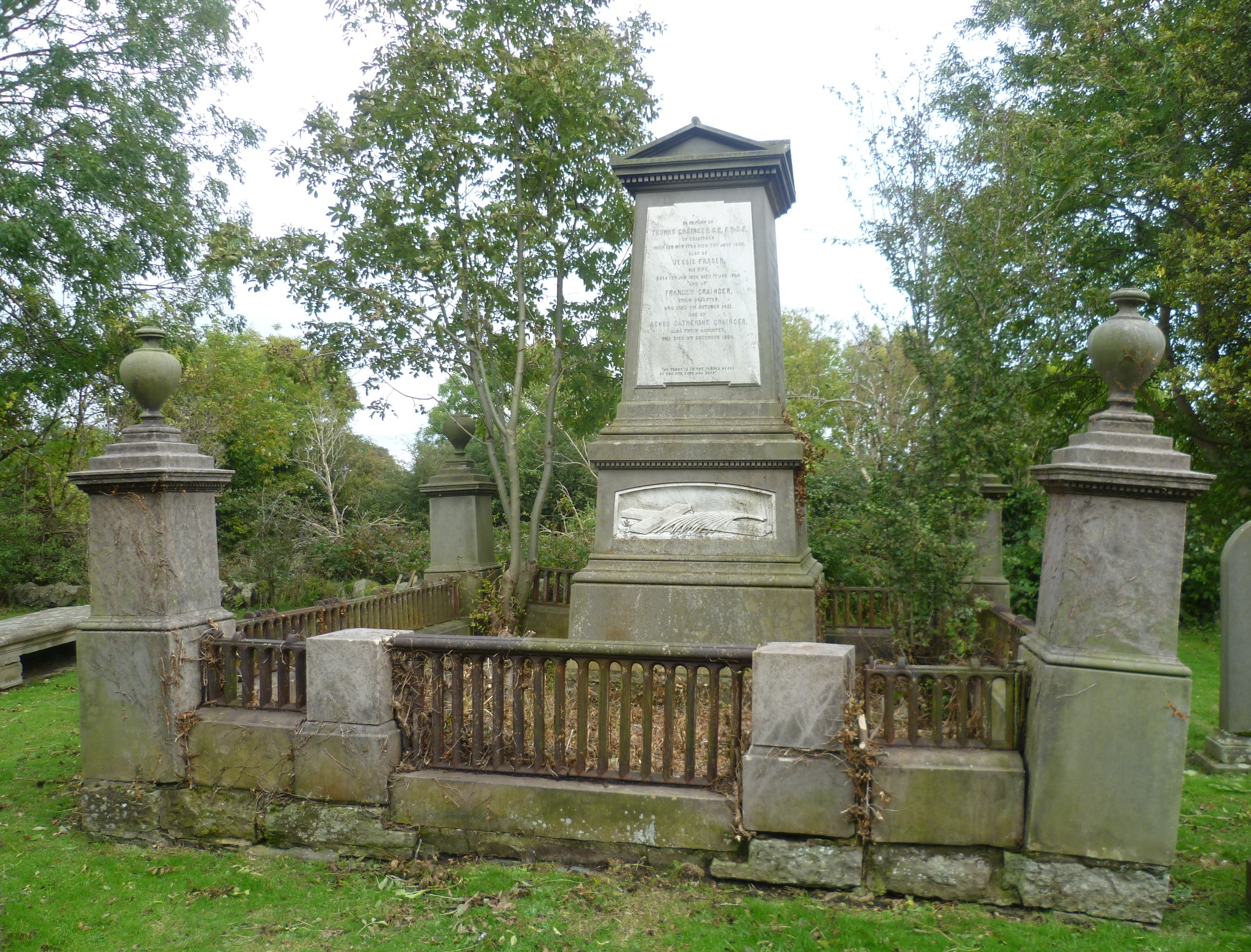
Grainger's grave at Gogar

Thomas Grainger FRSE (12 November 1794 – 25 July 1852) was a Scottish civil engineer and surveyor. He was joint partner with John Miller in the prominent engineering firm of Grainger & Miller.

== Life ==
Grainger was born at Gogar Green near Ratho, outside Edinburgh to Helen Marshall and Hugh Grainger. Educated at the University of Edinburgh, at 16 he got a job with John Leslie, a land surveyor.

He started his own practice in 1816, and in 1825 he formed a partnership with John Miller which lasted until 1847. Their firm operated from the ground floor of Grainger's house at 56 George Street, in the centre of Edinburgh's New Town.

Between 1845 and 1849 his company worked on the digging of the Bramhope Tunnel and building the Arthington Viaduct as part of laying the Leeds to Stockton-on-Tees line. The first modern rail ferry, the Leviathan, was designed in 1849 by Grainger for the Edinburgh, Perth and Dundee Railway to cross the Firth of Forth between Granton and Burntisland. The service commenced on 3 February 1850.

Projects he was involved in included many railway bridges, viaducts and tunnels, including work on the Monkland and Kirkintilloch Railway, Ballochney Railway, Garnkirk and Glasgow Railway, Wishaw and Coltness Railway, Paisley and Renfrew Railway, Dundee and Arbroath Railway, Arbroath and Forfar Railway, and the Leeds Northern Railway, where he was chief engineer at the time of his death.

He was president of the Royal Scottish Society of Arts 1849–51, and a fellow of the Royal Society of Edinburgh 1850.

Benjamin Hall Blyth served as an apprentice under him.

He died in Stockton-on-Tees on 25 July 1852 as a result of injuries sustained in a train collision two days earlier. One of two fatal casualties, Grainger had sustained a compound fracture to his right leg, which quickly turned gangrenous. Following his death his body was returned home for burial in the family plot in the kirkyard at Gogar.

== Family ==
On 24 January 1843 he married Jessie Fraser (1809-1880). They had three daughters: Isabella Helen, Jessie Frances and Agnes Catherine. While Isabella is thought to have died young, Jessie and Agnes died in London in 1921 and 1934 respectively, both having been resident there since at least 1871. They are buried in the family plot at Gogar.

== Main works ==
- New sea-wall at Newhaven Harbour (1837)
- Broughty Ferry railway station (1838)
- Haymarket railway station, Edinburgh (1840) with David Bell
- Bridge at Russell Place in Edinburgh (1843)
- North Leith railway station (1845) demolished despite being an architectural gem and the prototype of all future railway stations
- Railway bridge at Warriston, Edinburgh (1845)
- Cupar railway station (1846)
- Ladybank railway station (1847)
- Markinch railway station (1847)
- Burntisland railway station (1847)
- Leeds to Thirsk line including

- Kirkstall Road Viaduct (1849)
- Bramhope Tunnel (1849)
- Arthington Viaduct (1849)

- Yarm Viaduct over the Tees (1852)
