= Yarm Viaduct =

Railway viaduct over the River Tees in England

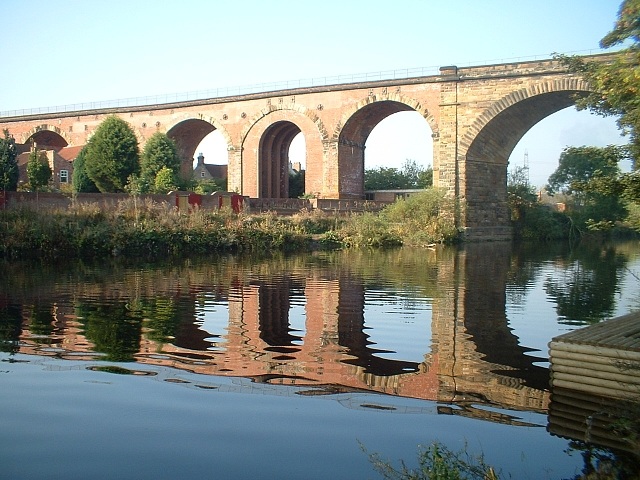
- Yarm Viaduct; the second arch on the left after the river has been strengthened with extra bricks
- Coordinates: 54.511411°N 1.356910°W
- OS grid reference: NZ417131
- Carries: Railway traffic
- Crosses: River Tees
- Locale: Yarm, North Yorkshire/County Durham
- Owner: Network Rail
- Maintained by: Network Rail

Characteristics
- Total length: 2,280 feet (690 m)
- Height: 65 feet (20 m) (above river)
- Longest span: 67 feet (20 m)
- No. of spans: 43
- Piers in water: 1

Rail characteristics
- No. of tracks: 2
- Track gauge: 4 ft 8 1/2 in (1,435 mm)

History
- Designer: Thomas Grainger; John Bourne
- Constructed by: Trowsdale, Jackson & Garbutt
- Construction start: 1849
- Construction cost: £44,500 (1852)
- Opened: 15 May 1852

Statistics

Listed Building – Grade II
- Official name: YARM VIADUCT
- Designated: 23 June 1966
- Reference no.: 1139259

Location
- Interactive map of Yarm Viaduct

Yarm Viaduct is a railway viaduct carrying the railways above the town of Yarm in North Yorkshire, England. It crosses the River Tees which forms the boundary between North Yorkshire and County Durham. The railway runs between Northallerton and Eaglescliffe, and was opened in 1852 as part of the extension of the Leeds Northern Railway to Stockton-on-Tees. The line and viaduct are currently owned and maintained by Network Rail and carry passenger traffic for TransPennine Express and Grand Central train operating companies. It also sees a variety of freight traffic.

The viaduct consists of 43 arches; 41 of which are made of red brick, with the two arches straddling the water constructed of stone. The viaduct, which is cited for its appearance and height above the town, was grade II listed in 1966.

== History ==
The section of line through Yarm to Eaglescliffe (original Preston) Junction was formally started in July 1847, but work on the viaduct did not commence until 1849.

The structure opened up to traffic on 15 May 1852 and it was the last work completed by Grainger as he died two months later in a railway accident in Stockton-on-Tees. The viaduct is noted for its height above the town of Yarm and is variously described as being "towering", "very beautiful" and "great". One local writer described the viaduct as being "acknowledged as the finest in the kingdom". Due to its height and length, when viewing the town from afar (especially from the west) the viaduct is a dominating structure across the town.

The line that the viaduct is on (Northallerton to Eaglescliffe line) carries passenger services for Grand Central (Sunderland to London King's Cross) and TransPennine Express (Redcar Central to Manchester Airport) as well as a variety of freight traffic to and from the north east.

The structure was strengthened in two of its spans with extra bricks on the inside of the arches, and stabilisation works undertaken in 2001 due to subsidence lessened the vibrations felt by property owners below the viaduct either significantly or completely.

Network Rail carried out further structural work in 2024 and 2025 after problems were found in the foundations of 14 of the 43 piers. The work involved piercing the bottom of the piers with steel girders, the ends of which were encased in concrete blocks secured to the underlying bedrock. The cost of the work was £8 million.

== Structure ==
The viaduct extends for over 2,280 feet (690 m) in a north/south direction over the town of Yarm and across the River Tees. It consists of 43 arches; 41 of them are 40 feet (12 m) span and are constructed of 7.5 million red bricks. The other two arches are constructed from stone and are 67 feet (20 m) across (Note: The original design by Grainger had called for a single span over the water of 125 feet (38 m)) with one pier standing in the river. The two spans across the river are composed of 139,000 cubic feet (3,900 m^{3}) of stone and are skewed across the river by 20 degrees. On the downstream side of the viaduct (eastern side) is a large plaque set into the stone section where the bridge spans the river. This commemorates the engineers and contractors on the project.

Workers on the structure (navvies) were paid £1 per day with the total cost of the bridge being £44,500 by its completion in 1852 (£5.6 million equivalent in 2016). A system of pulleys worked by teams of horses allowed the raw materials to be brought onto the site.

== Incidents ==
- In 1855, when Yarm railway station was at the northern end of the viaduct, (Note: The original station opened with the line in 1852 and closed in 1960. A new station was opened in 1996 some distance south of the first station across the river on the Yorkshire side.) a train travelling south overshot the station in the darkness and bad weather. A passenger alighted from a carriage and fell 74 feet (23 m) to his death.
- In 1997, a train of ballast became partially derailed in Eaglescliffe as it was heading south. When it travelled over the viaduct, loose ballast from the derailed wagon was thrown 100 feet (30 m) onto the properties below the viaduct.
