= Bramhope =

Village and civil parish in West Yorkshire, England

Coordinates: 53.8829°N 1.6095°W

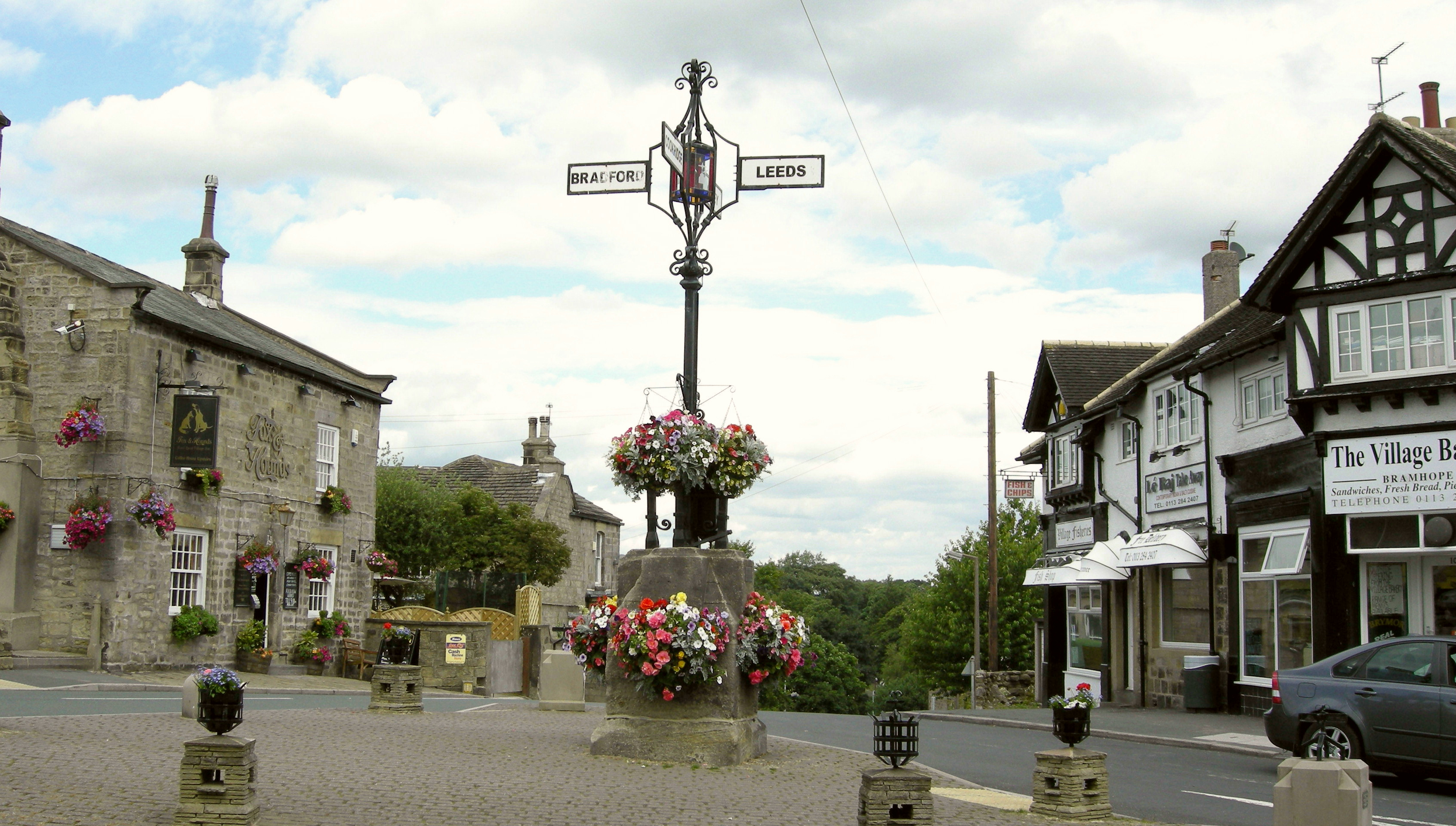
- Bramhope crossroads

- Location within West Yorkshire
- Population: 3,400
- OS grid reference: SE253432
  - London: 175 mi (282 km) SSE
- Civil parish: Bramhope
- Metropolitan borough: City of Leeds
- Metropolitan county: West Yorkshire
- Region: Yorkshire and the Humber
- Country: England
- Sovereign state: United Kingdom
- Post town: LEEDS
- Postcode district: LS16
- Dialling code: 0113
- Police: West Yorkshire
- Fire: West Yorkshire
- Ambulance: Yorkshire
- UK Parliament: Leeds North West

Bramhope is a village and civil parish in the City of Leeds metropolitan borough, West Yorkshire, England, north of Holt Park and north east of Cookridge.

The village is 9 miles (14 km) north of Leeds city centre and it is in the LS16 Leeds postcode area. According to the 2001 census the parish had a population of 3,400. The population had increased to 3,533 at the 2011 Census. It is predominantly made up of large, privately owned houses which tend to be above the average value for properties in West Yorkshire.

Bramhope sits in the Leeds North West constituency and the Adel & Wharfedale ward of Leeds City Council.

== Etymology ==
The place-name Bramhope appears first in the Domesday Book of 1086 as Brahop and Bramhop, with later medieval spellings including Bramhop(a) and Bramhop(p)e. The name seems to derive from the Old English words brōm 'broom' and hōp 'a small valley, side-valley off a larger valley', here referring to a small valley off Wharfedale, probably the one through which flows Bramhope Beck.

== History ==
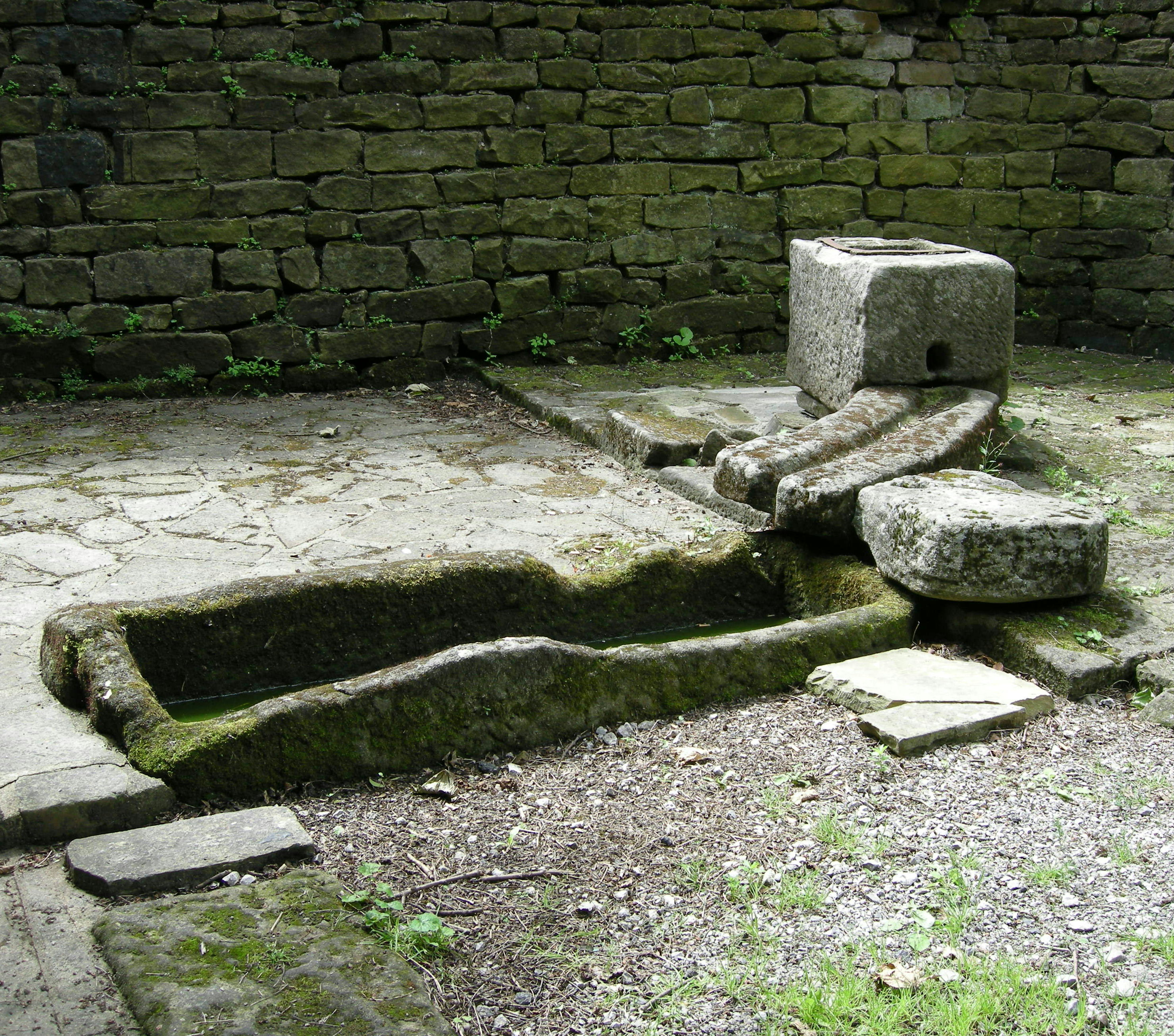
Town well

The earliest known settlement in the area was a British camp established off Moor Road. The Romans built a road through the area from Adel to Ilkley, traces of which remain in a field near Leeds Bradford Airport.

In 1086, Bramhope was the manor of an Anglo-Saxon thegn, Uchill. In 1095 the manor passed to the Percy family, and in 1165 was sold to Ralph de Bramhope. In the 13th century the monasteries owned much of the land and had granges where sheep were grazed. The monks used tracks, such as Scotland Lane and Staircase Lane, as they travelled from their outlying granges to Kirkstall Abbey.

The village had a small population until the 20th century. The Black Death of 1348-49 reduced the number of adults to 34, but this gradually increased to about 400 in 1900. Now it is approximately 3,400. Water was drawn from private wells or the town well at the foot of Northgate (now Church Hill). The town well was restored in 1991 by the Bramhope History Group, and is located opposite St Giles' Church. The plaque says that the well was exposed in 1991, so perhaps it had been lost for some time.

== Churches ==
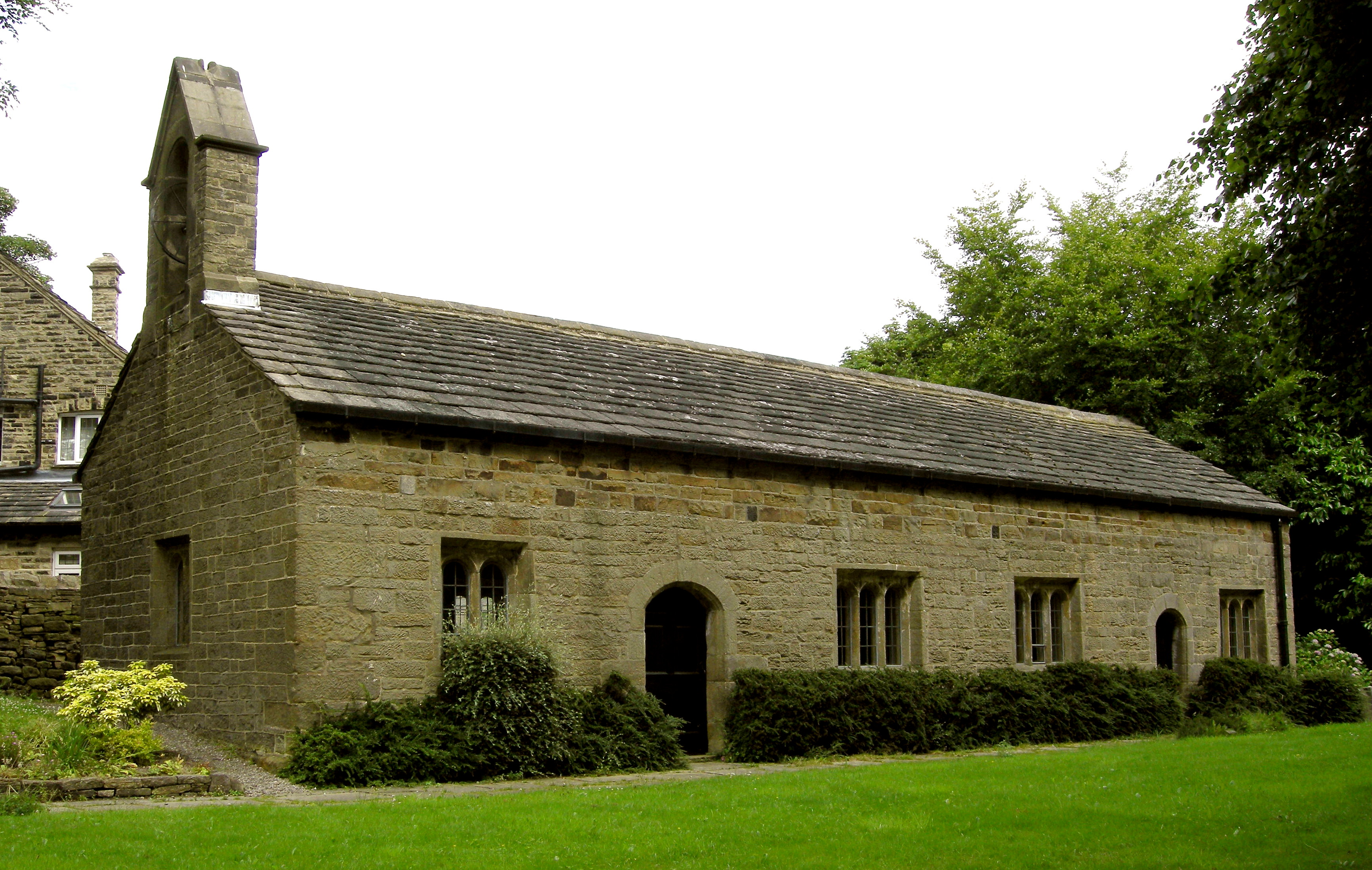
Puritan Chapel, 1649

At the dissolution of the monasteries Henry VIII gave the land to the Earl of Cumberland. In the 16th century the Dyneley family moved into the area and acquired Bramhope Hall. In 1649 they built the Puritan Chapel, which was taken over by the Church of England after the Restoration. The chapel is one of only a few built during the Commonwealth period. It is said not to have been consecrated but nevertheless was regularly used for church services until 1881–82. The Puritan Chapel was listed Grade I in 1966.

When the chapel proved too small for the growing population, St Giles' Church was built in 1881. The original Methodist chapel was built in 1837 and replaced by the much bigger church in 1896. There is a map showing the location of St Giles and the Methodist church here. Bramhope Cemetery, established in 1861, is in Moor Road, but there are still some historical gravestones remaining in the cemetery of the Puritan Chapel.

== Road and railway ==
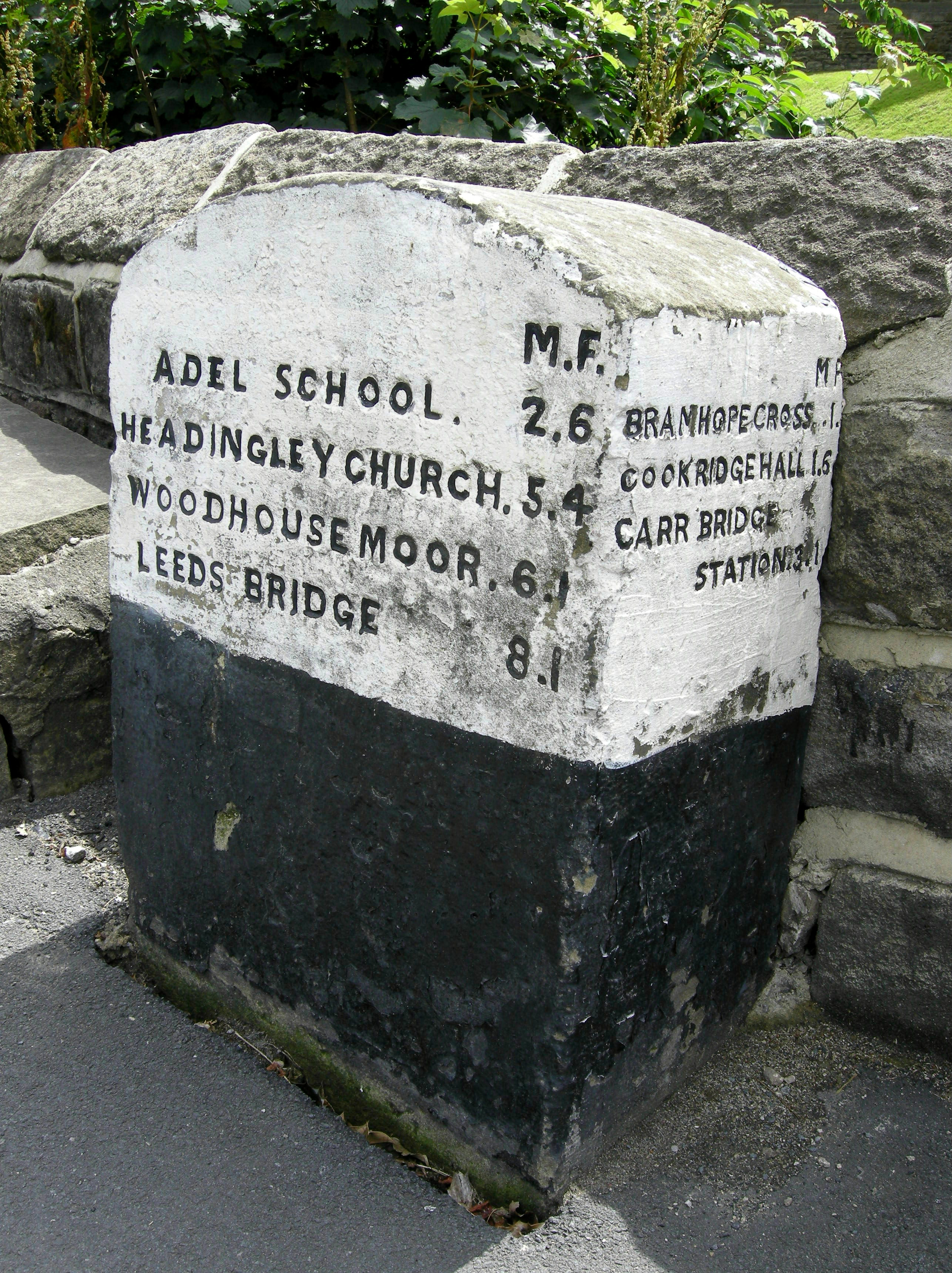
Milestone near St Giles' Church

For many centuries travellers to the market towns in the vicinity used Otley Old Road. However, it was the Leeds to Otley turnpike road, with its tollhouses, opened in 1842, which routed travellers through the outskirts of Bramhope. It is along this route that motorists today travel between Leeds and the northwest. The milestones along the road were erected in 1850.

The railway was excavated under the village through the Bramhope Tunnel constructed between 1845 and 1849. The tunnel has an elaborate castellated northern entrance and there are many heaps of spoil and several ventilation shafts along its length. There is a replica of the tunnel entrance in Otley churchyard, erected as a memorial to the 24 men who lost their lives during the tunnel's construction. A railway station has never been built at or near Bramhope.

== Schools ==
A village school was built in Eastgate where the war memorial garden is situated. A plaque states "On this site in 1790 a Day School was erected by the freeholders and copyholders of Bramhope Township. It was also used as a Sunday School and Public Meeting Place. Demolished 1961". The school became overcrowded whilst tunnelling work for the railway was going on in the late 1840s. It was replaced by a larger building in 1873 in Breary Lane, next to the shopping parade. The present school, situated on Tredgold Crescent, was opened in 1961.

== Community ==
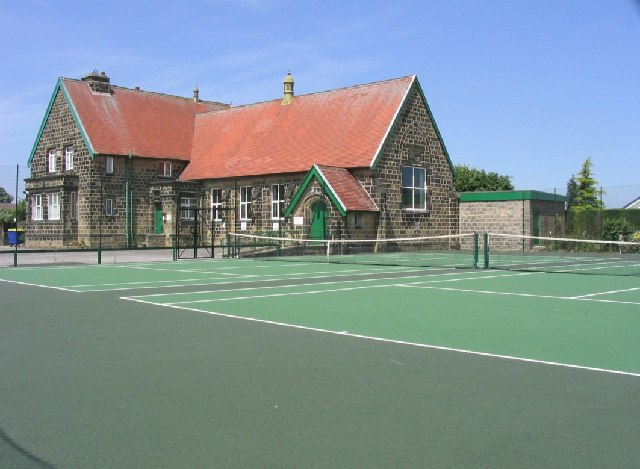
Robert Craven Memorial Hall

Bramhope has a Round Table, which organises activities to raise money for charity. Bramhope has a cricket club which plays at the Recreation Ground on Old Lane. The club plays in the Leeds and Wetherby Cricket League and has two senior teams.

=== Memorial Hall ===
Robert Craven Memorial Hall (originally the Craven Institute, 1896) was part of the bequest of Robert Craven, a local farmer. It is now the village hall and administered as a registered charity. It has a crown bowling green, car park and tennis courts. Inside there are various rooms plus a large hall with stage, which doubles as a badminton court. On the second Saturday of every month a farmer's market is hosted at this hall. The memorial hall also hosts a yearly flower show in the autumn, and a bridge club.

=== Bramhope Scout Campsite ===
The 13-acre Bramhope Scout Campsite, to the west of the village, is owned by Central Yorkshire Scouts.

== Listed buildings ==
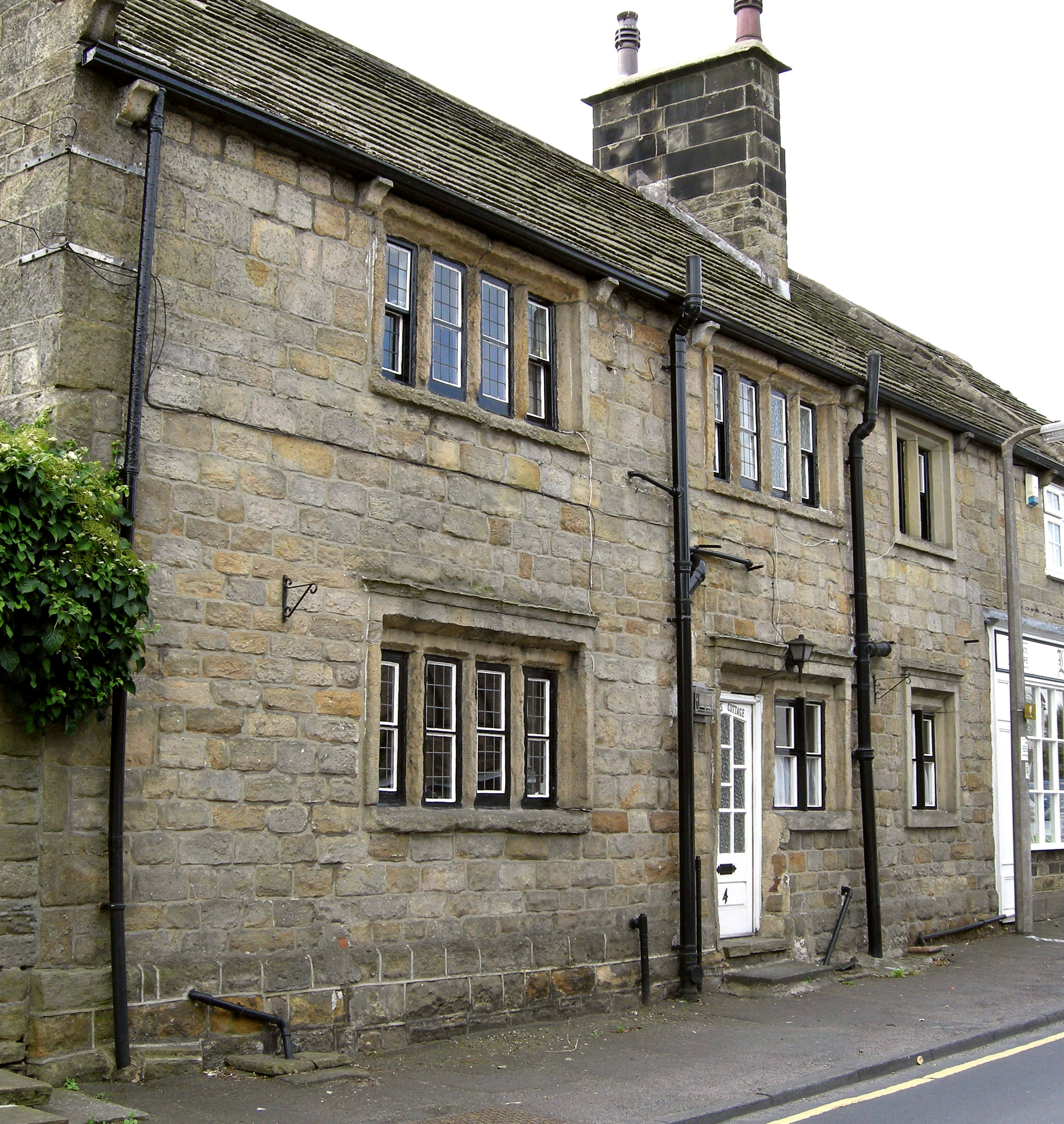
Old weaver's cottage, now private residence

- Grade I buildings: Puritan Chapel, Otley Road (north side).
- Grade II buildings: Farmhouse at 1 Church Hill; Barn about 5 metres west of Old Manor Farmhouse; Old Manor Farmhouse (rear portion only); Weaver's Cottage, 4 Eastgate; Methodist Church, Eastgate, north side; Gazebo on north-east corner of garden of Belvedere, Hall Drive (south side); Manor House, Manor Close (north side); Sighting tower, south side of Moorland Road; The Hollies, Old Lane (north side); Portal to north entrance to Bramhope railway tunnel.
- Grade II Mileposts: Milepost on east corner of junction with Church Hill and Ditley Road (south side); Milepost at SE 240 441, Otley Road (north side); Milepost at SE 253 432, Otley Road (north side); Milepost at SE 264 421, Otley Road (north side); Milepost on east corner of junction with Breary Lane at SE 255 430, Otley Road (south side); Milepost on east corner of junction with Breary lane east at SE 256 430, Otley road (north side); Milepost on south-east corner of junction with Pool Bank New Road at SE 241 440, Otley Road (south side); Milepost on south-west corner of junction with Pool Bank New Road st SE 241440, Otley Road (south side); Milepost on west corner of junction with Creskeld Lane at SE 258 428, Otley Road (north side).
- Related Grade II listing at Otley: Memorial to victims of Bramhope tunnel disaster (sic), Church Lane (north side), Otley.

== Notable people ==
- Gold medal Winner at London 2012 Alistair Brownlee and bronze medal-winning brother Jonathan Brownlee

== Gallery ==
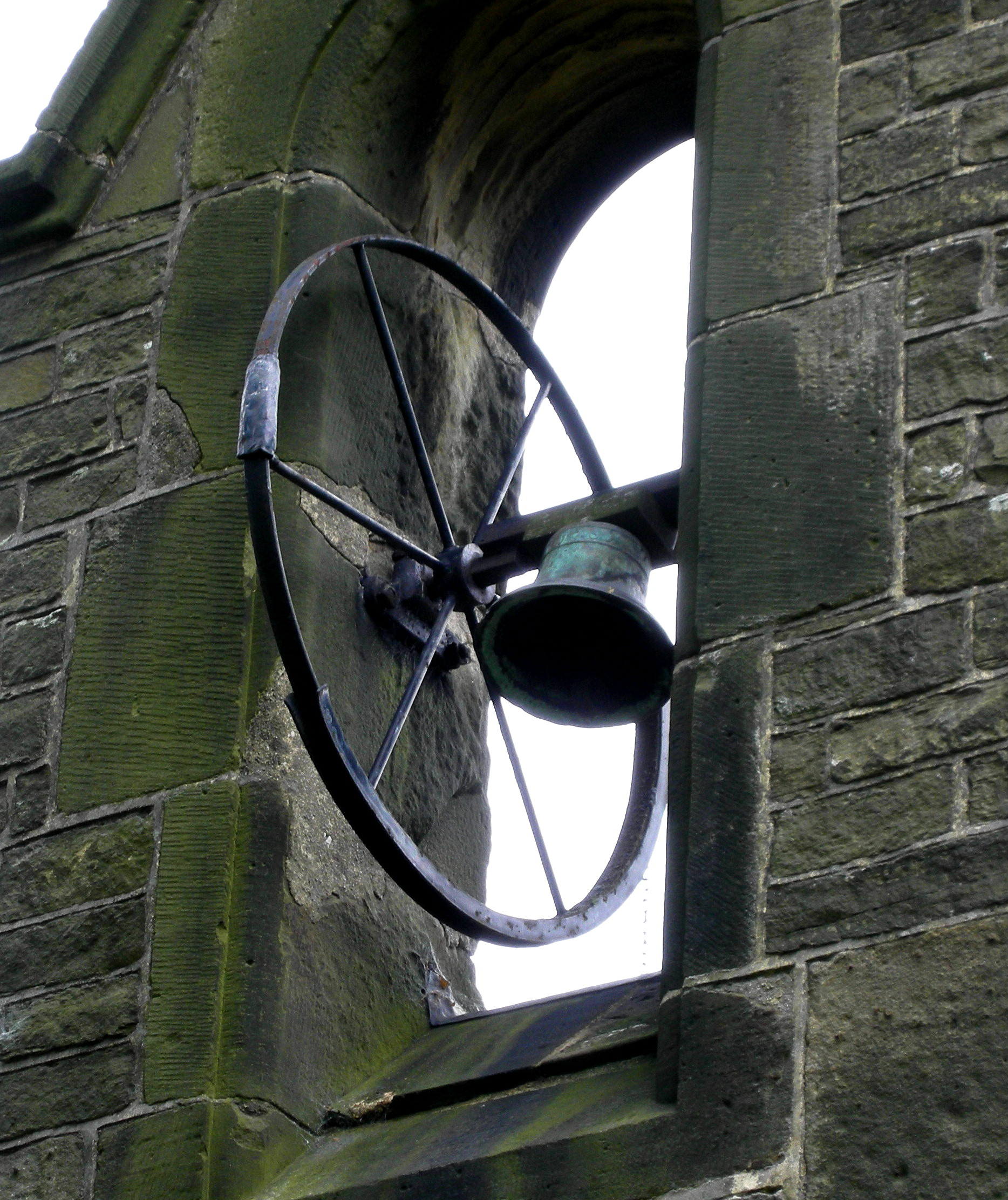
Bell on Puritan Church, 1649

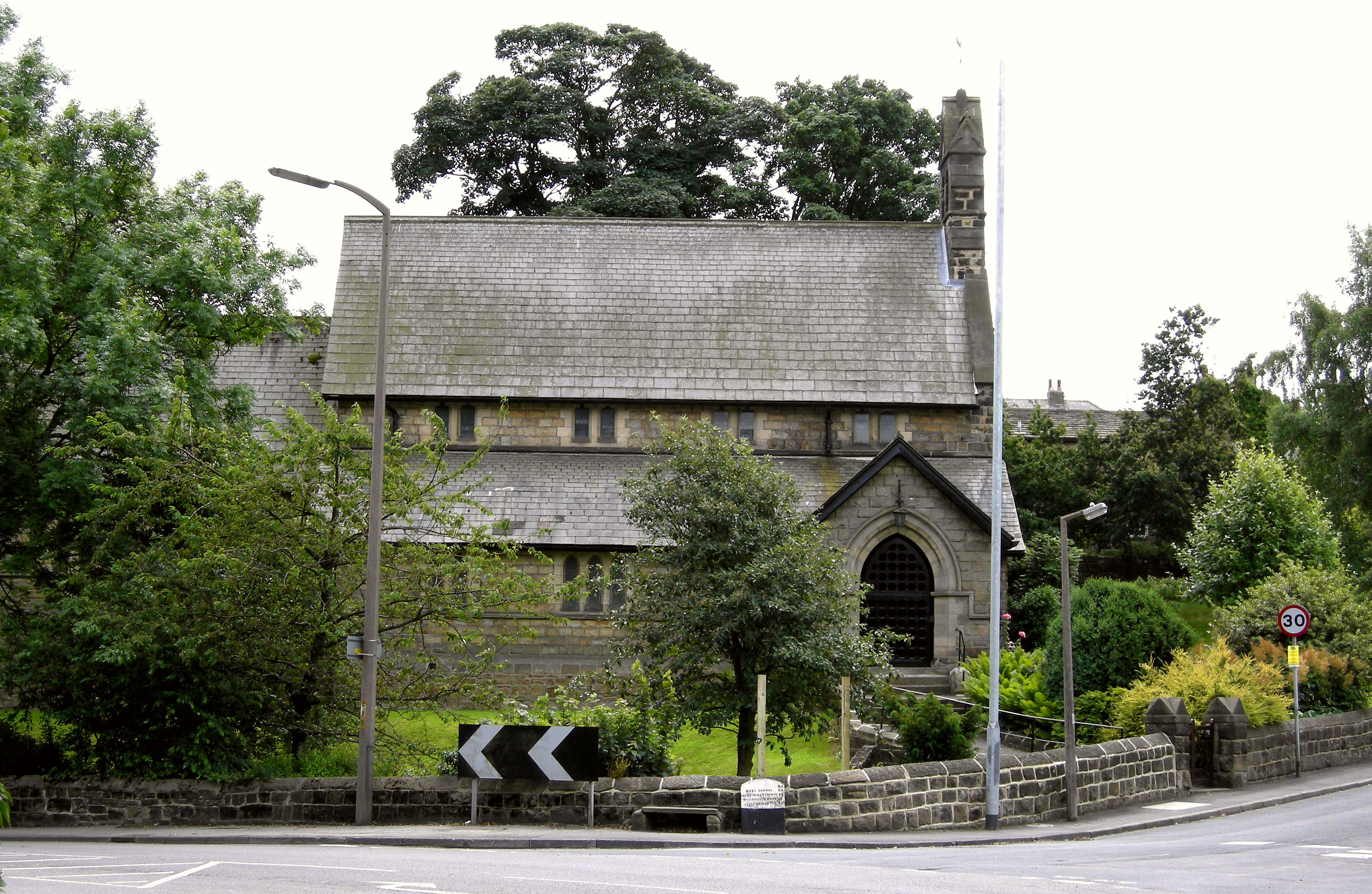
St Giles' Church, 1881

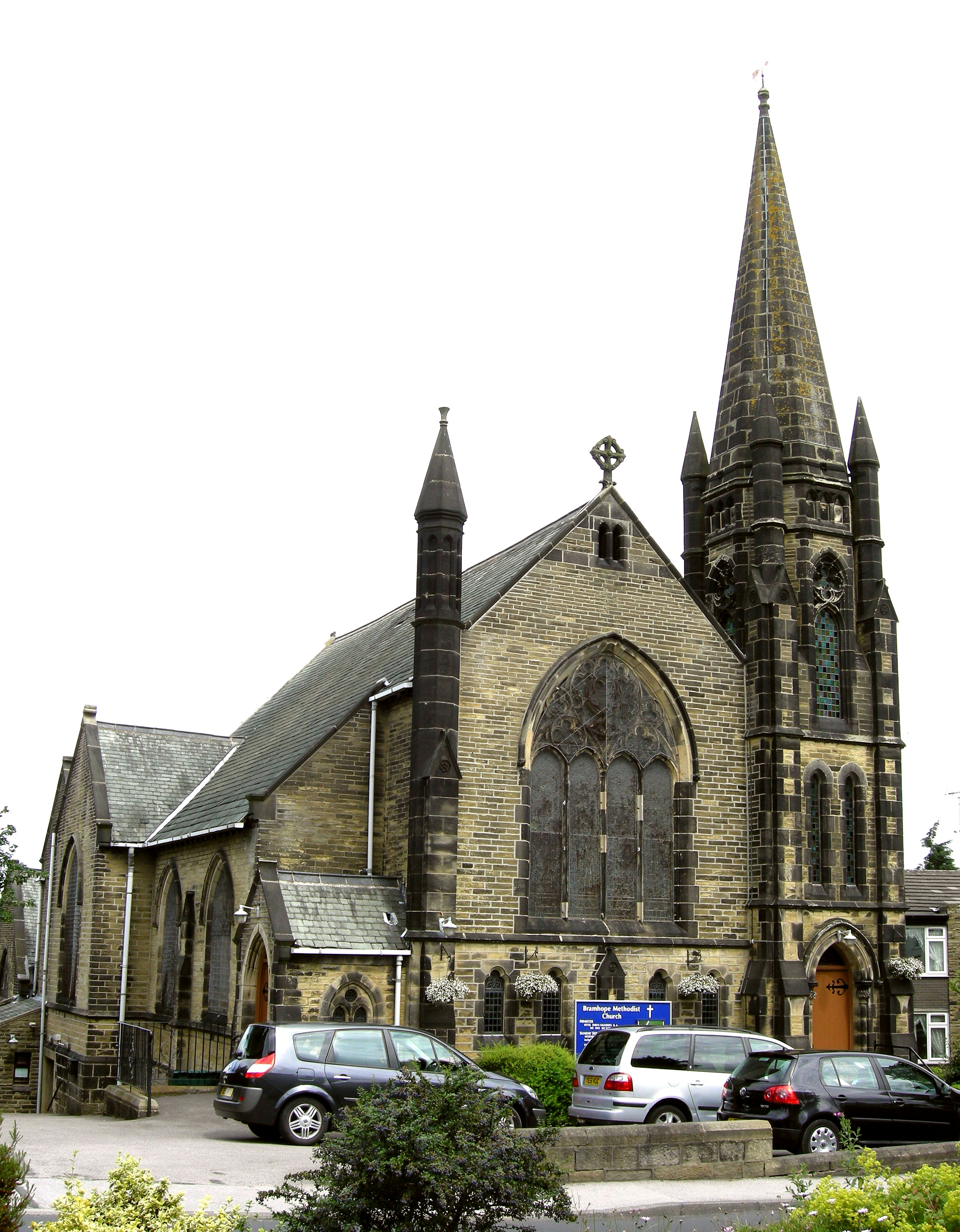
Methodist Church, 1896

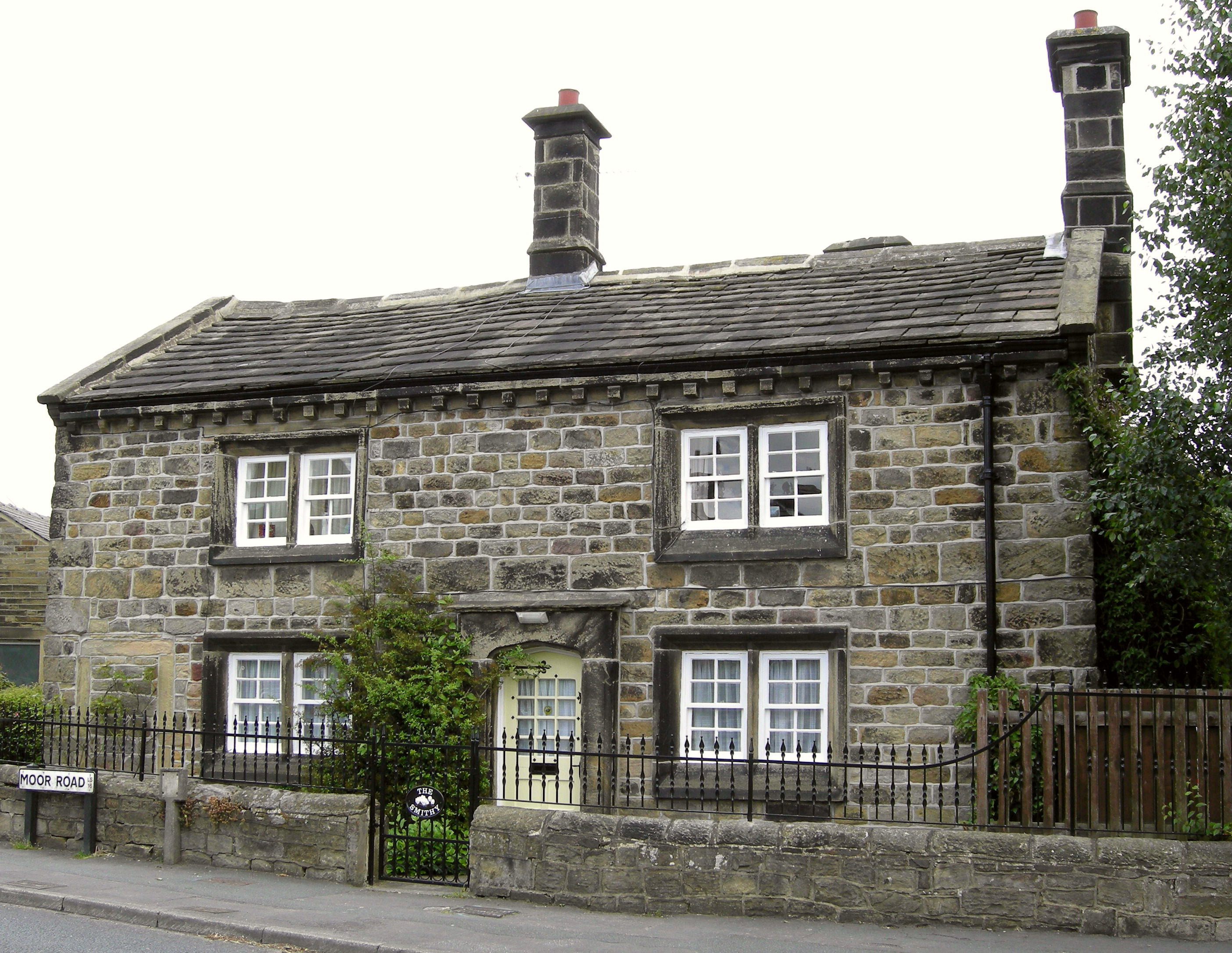
Old smithy, 1687

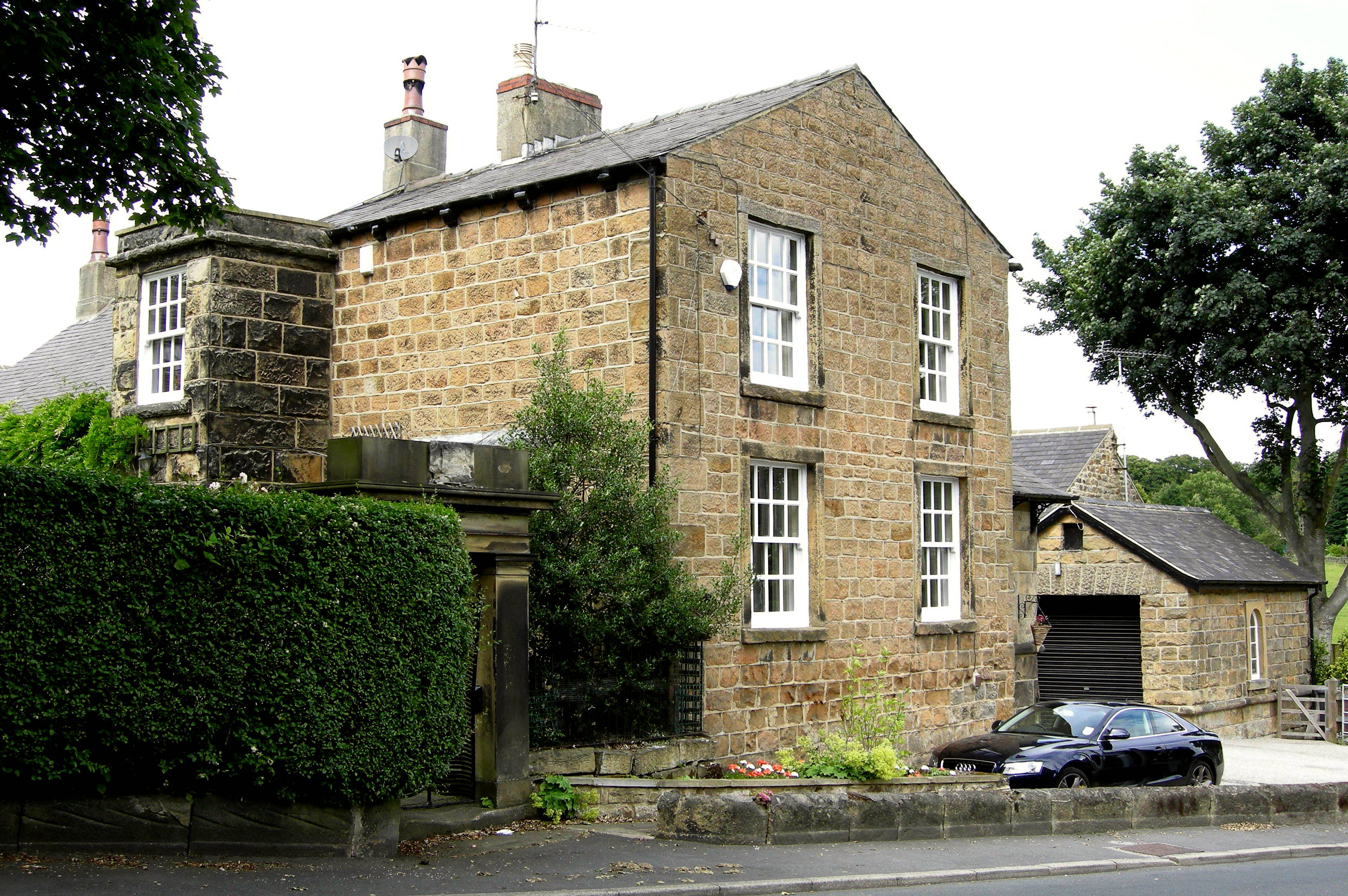
Old manor farm house, 1691

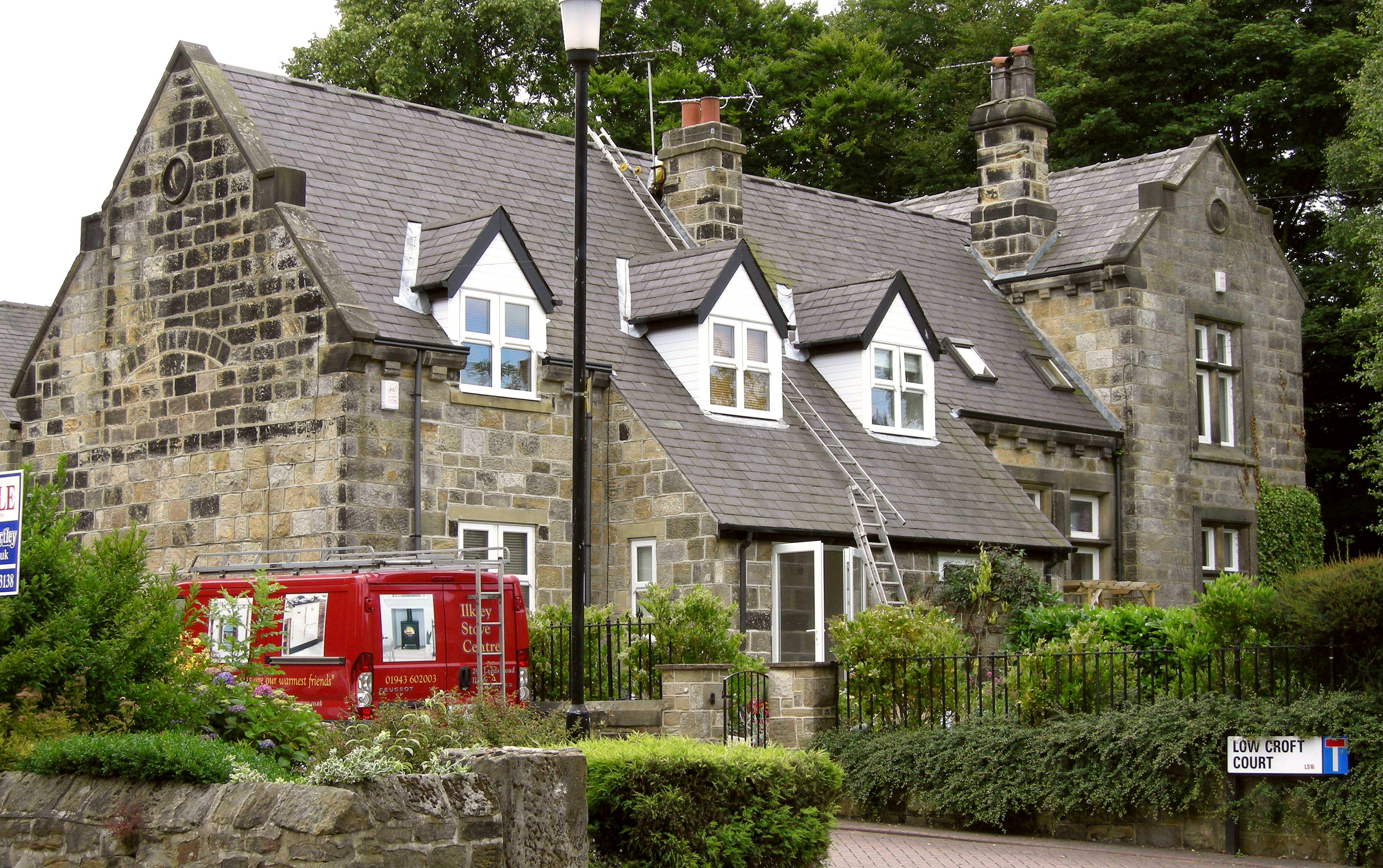
Old school house 1873, now flats

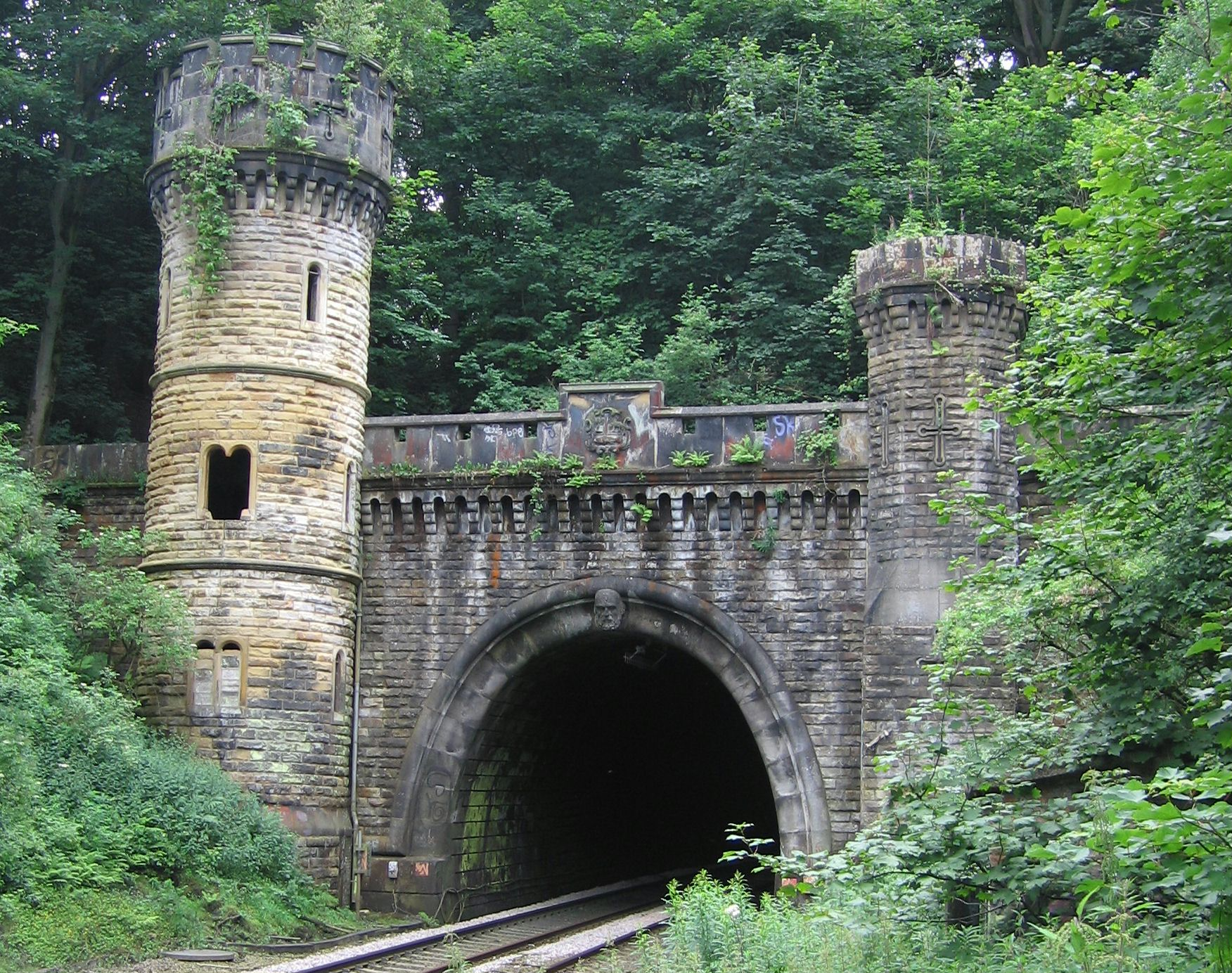
Bramhope Tunnel north portal with castellated towers

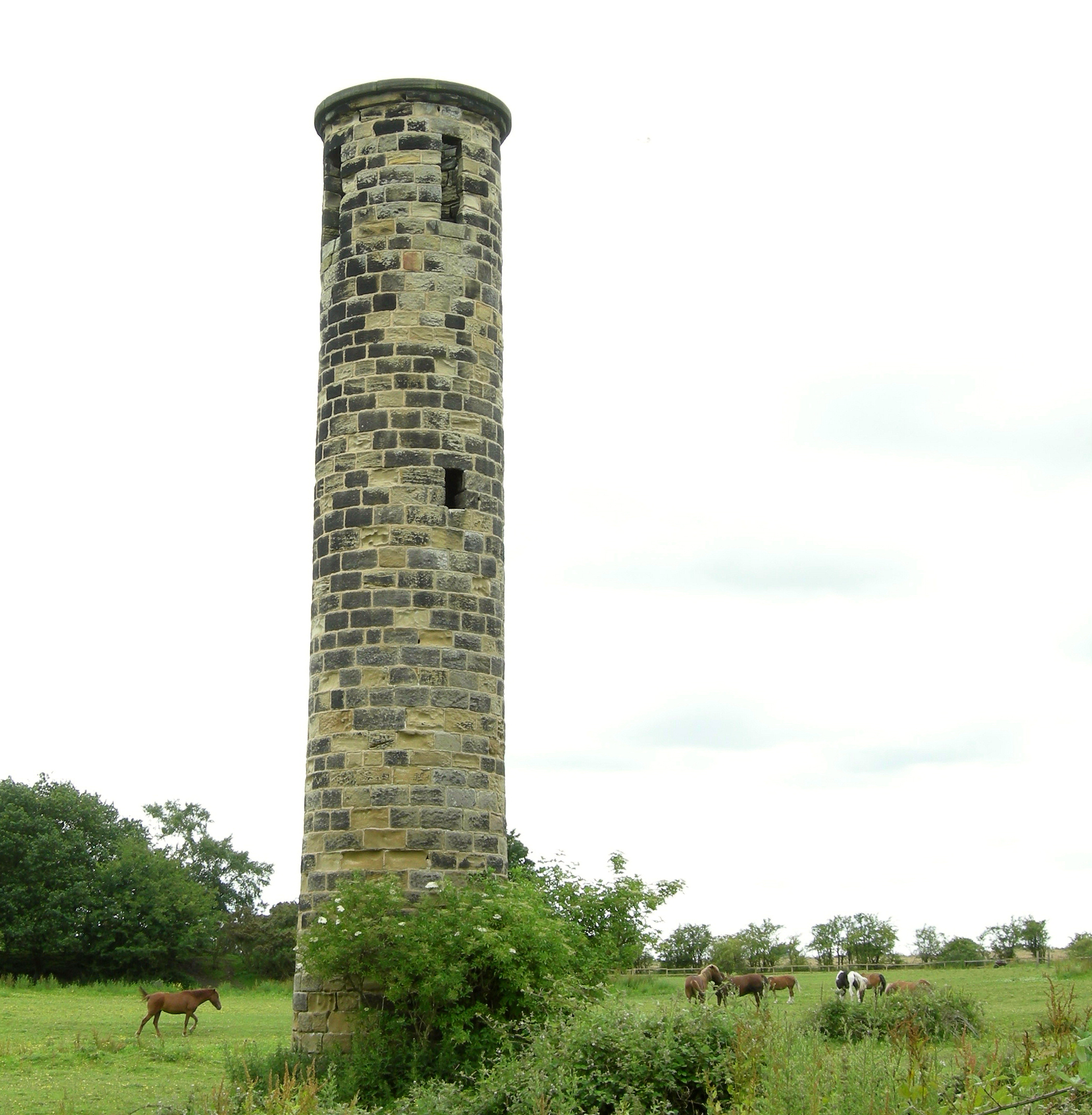
Sighting tower over Bramhope Tunnel route

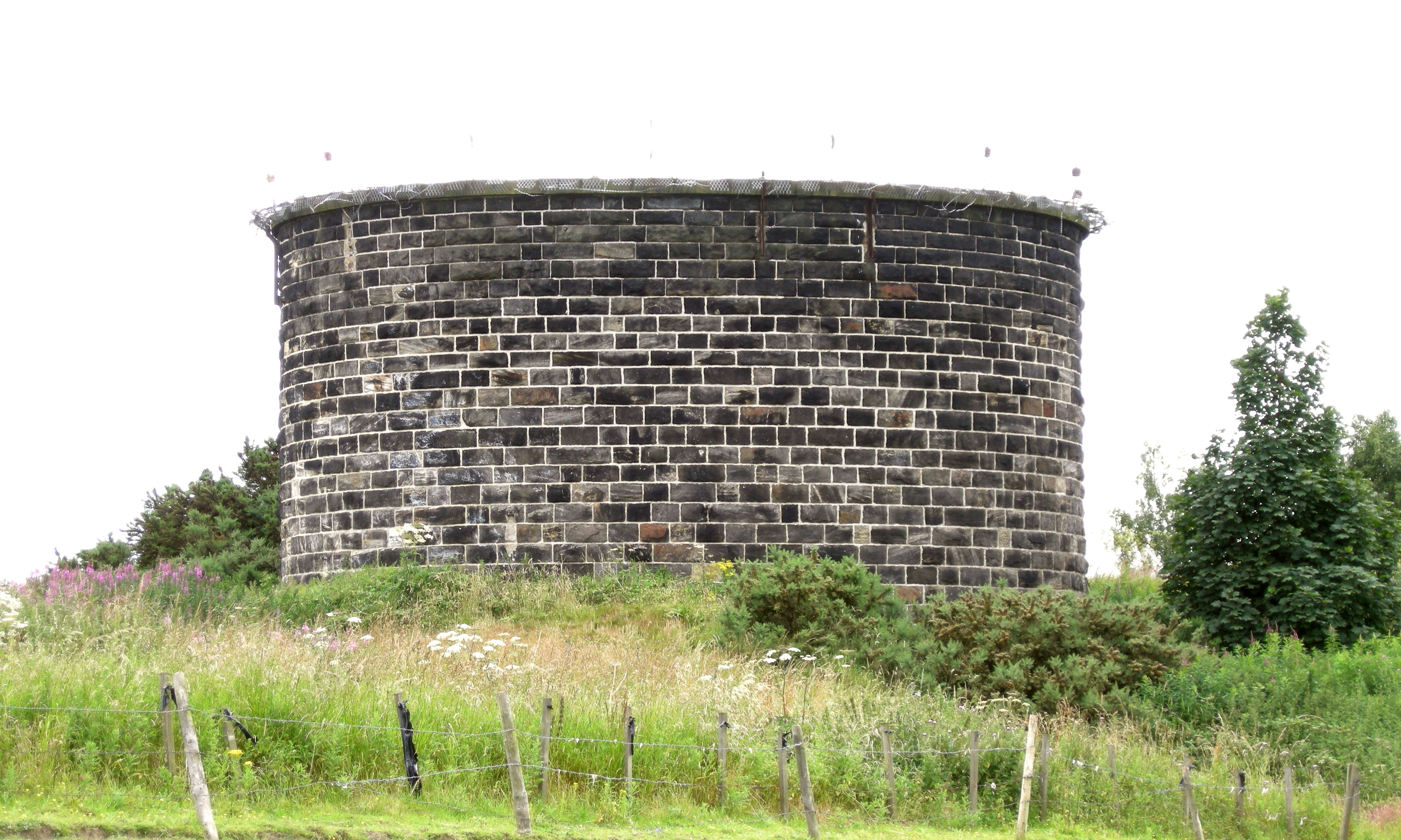
Ventilation shaft serving Bramhope Tunnel

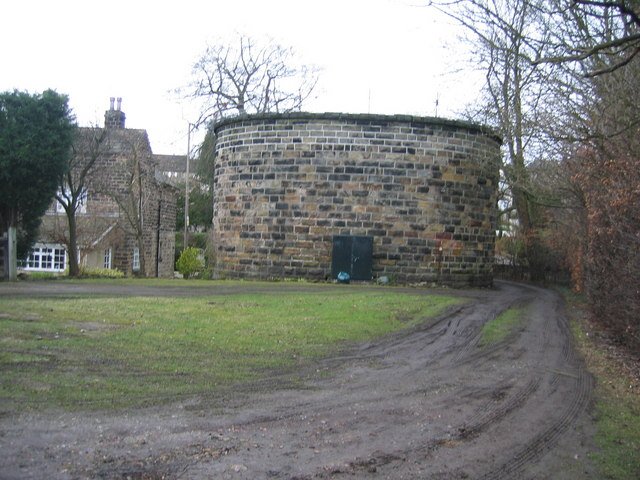
Ventilation shaft in centre of Bramhope

== See also ==
- Listed buildings in Bramhope
