= Customary freehold =

Customary freehold is in English law a species of tenure which may be described as a variety of copyhold. It is also termed privileged copyhold or copyhold of frank tenure. It is a tenure by copy of manorial roll, but not expressed to be at the will of the lord. It is, in fact, only a superior kind of copyhold, and the freehold is in the lord. It is subject to the general law of copyholds, except where the law may be varied by the custom of the particular manor.

== See also ==
- Fee
- Fee simple
- Feu
- Feudalism
- Life estate
- Real estate
- Real property
