= Leeds Northern Railway =

19th-century British railway company

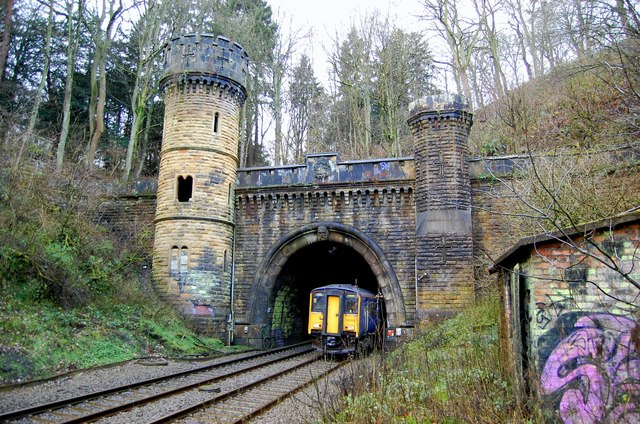
Bramhope Tunnel

The Leeds Northern Railway (LNR), until 1851 the Leeds and Thirsk Railway, was an English railway company that built and opened a line from Leeds to Stockton via Harrogate and Thirsk. In 1845 the Leeds and Thirsk Railway received permission for a line from Leeds to Thirsk, part of which opened in 1848, but problems building the Bramhope Tunnel delayed trains operating into Leeds until 1849.

The Leeds and Thirsk Railway Company changed its name to the Leeds Northern Railway on 8 August 1851 before its line to Stockton opened. The company formed an alliance with the West Hartlepool Harbour and Railway and was involved in a price war with the York, Newcastle and Berwick Railway (YN&BR). A merger of the YN&BR with the LNR and the York and North Midland Railway (Y&NM) was accepted by LNR shareholders, and by royal assent on 31 July 1854 the three companies merged to become the North Eastern Railway.

Today, sections of the former Leeds Northern Railway line form the Harrogate Line between Leeds and Harrogate, and the Northallerton to Stockton Line.

== Leeds and Thirsk Railway ==
Leeds and Thirsk Railway Act 1845
- Act of Parliament
- Parliament of the United Kingdom
- Long title: An Act for making a Railway from Leeds to Thirsk, with Branches therefrom.
- Citation: 8 & 9 Vict. c. civ

Dates
- Royal assent: 21 July 1845

In 1845 the provisional committee of the Leeds and Thirsk Railway submitted a private bill to Parliament seeking permission to build a railway and in the same year the Great North of England Railway (GNER) presented a competing bill for a line to Leeds from a junction with its line at Pilmoor. The GNER withdrew its bill after it was leased by the Newcastle and Darlington Junction Railway, which was controlled by the railway financier George Hudson. The Leeds and Thirsk Railway Act 1845 (8 & 9 Vict. c. civ) received royal assent on 21 July 1845 and construction started on 20 October 1845.

Mineral traffic was carried between Ripon and Thirsk on 5 January 1848, and this section officially opened on 31 May with public services starting the following day. The section between Weeton and Wormald Green opened on 1 September and was connected to the line at Ripon on 13 September. The Leeds and Thirsk Railway's station in Harrogate was at Starbeck (initially called Harrogate) outside the town centre in the Crimple Valley. The York and North Midland Railway opened Harrogate station in the town centre at Brunswick, which was accessed via a line over the Crimple Viaduct. The Leeds and Thirsk Line passed under the viaduct en route to Starbeck. Although the station at Brunswick was more convenient, the Leeds and Thirsk offered a shorter journey to Leeds from Starbeck.

Extension of the line into Leeds was delayed by problems encountered during the construction of the 3,761-yard (3.439 km) long Bramhope Tunnel. Tunnellers encountered large quantities of water that had to be pumped out and many workers died during its construction. A memorial in the form of a replica of the tunnel's northern portal is in Otley churchyard. The completed line opened on 9 July 1849 when three trains carried 2,000 shareholders from Leeds to Thirsk and back. A temporary terminus opened on Wellington Street Leeds until services were accommodated at Leeds Central and then at the Midland Railway's Wellington Street station.

== Extension to Stockton ==
Leeds and Hartlepool Railway Act 1846
- Act of Parliament
- Parliament of the United Kingdom
- Long title: An Act to enable the Leeds and Thirsk Railway Company to make a Railway from Northallerton to the Stockton and Hartlepool Railway.
- Citation: 9 & 10 Vict. c. cxlix

Dates
- Royal assent: 16 July 1846

Leeds and Thirsk Railway (Melmerby and Northallerton Junction) Act 1848
- Act of Parliament
- Parliament of the United Kingdom
- Long title: An Act for enabling the Leeds and Thirsk Railway Company to make a Railway from Melmerby to Northallerton, and to form a Junction with the York and Newcastle Railway.
- Citation: 11 & 12 Vict. c. lvi

Dates
- Royal assent: 22 July 1848

Text of statute as originally enacted

Leeds Northern Railway Act 1851
- Act of Parliament
- Parliament of the United Kingdom
- Long title: An Act for altering the Name of the Leeds and Thirsk Railway Company to the Name of the Leeds Northern Railway Company, for extending the Time for Completion of certain Works, for regulating the Capital of the Company, and for other Purposes.
- Citation: 14 & 15 Vict. c. xlvii

Dates
- Royal assent: 3 July 1851

Text of statute as originally enacted

The Leeds and Thirsk presented a bill in 1845–46 for a line from Wath (later Melmerby) to join the Stockton and Hartlepool Railway at Billingham. Under pressure from Hudson the route was changed so that the GNER would be used between Thirsk and Northallerton and the Leeds and Hartlepool Railway Act 1846 (9 & 10 Vict. c. cxlix) received royal assent on 16 July 1846. The Leeds and Thirsk returned for permission for a direct line from Melmerby to Northallerton which was approved in the Leeds and Thirsk Railway (Melmerby and Northallerton Junction) Act 1848 (11 & 12 Vict. c. lvi) on 22 July 1848.

The Leeds and Thirsk Railway received permission on 3 July 1851 in the Leeds Northern Railway Act 1851 (14 & 15 Vict. c. xlvii) to change its name to the Leeds Northern Railway . (Note: Sources differ on the date of this name change – Awdry (1990, p. 143) incorrectly states 3 July 1851, the date of royal assent of the act; Tomlinson (1915, p. 511) states 8 August 1851, the date of the last day of the session, specified by section 3 of the act as the date the name would change; and Allen (1974, p. 100) incorrectly says this happened in 1849.)

The East and West Yorkshire Junction Railway (E&WYJR) began constructing a line from York to Knaresborough in 1847, opening to a temporary station at Hay Park Lane on 30 October 1848 before being taken over by the York and North Midland Railway on 1 July 1851. A Leeds Northern branch from Harrogate (now Starbeck) opened to Knaresborough on 4 August 1851, which was also served by the York and North Midland Railway after completion of the E&WYJR viaduct over the River Nidd on 1 October 1851.

The northern end of the line between Leeds and Stockton passed under the York, Newcastle and Berwick Line, under a bridge that was built without interfering with the train services above. At Yarm a 760-yard (690 m) viaduct, designed by Thomas Grainger and John Bourne of Edinburgh, was built across the River Tees. The line was opened formally on 15 May 1852 and public traffic started on 2 June 1852. The Leeds Northern opened their own station 1/2 mile (800 m) south of a junction with the Stockton to Hartlepool line; after the West Hartlepool Harbour and Railway (Note: The Hartlepool Harbour and Railway had been formed in 1853 by the merger of the Stockton and Hartlepool Railway and the Clarence Railway.) diverted its services through this station in 1853 it was renamed North Stockton. A joint station with the Stockton and Darlington Railway (S&DR) opened at Eaglescliffe on 25 January 1853. After crossing to the south of the station, the railways each had two tracks running through the station and a single island platform was built between them and one side used by S&DR trains, the other by the Leeds Northern. Rather than allow trains to approach the platform line from either direction, the Board of Trade inspecting officer ruled that trains approaching on a line without a platform must first pass through and then reverse into the platform line.

== North Eastern Railway ==
In 1852, after the Leeds Northern Railway had reached Stockton and made an alliance with the West Hartlepool Harbour and Railway, a price war broke out with the York, Newcastle and Berwick Railway (YN&BR), the fare for 238 miles (383 km) between Leeds and Newcastle dropping to two shillings. (Note: Two shillings in 1852 was worth about the same as £12.07 in 2016.) T. E. Harrison, who had become General Manager and Engineer of the YN&BR, looked at merger of the YN&BR with both the Leeds Northern Railway and the York and North Midland Railway as the answer. With a proposal that the shares of the three companies remain separate, replaced by Berwick Capital Stock, York Capital Stock and Leeds Capital Stock, and dividends paid from pooled revenue, the agreement of the three boards was reached in November 1852. The deal was rejected by the shareholders of the Leeds Northern, who felt their seven per cent share of revenue too low; joint operation was agreed instead of a full merger and Harrison appointed General Manager. The benefits of this joint working allowed Harrison to raise the offer to the Leeds Northern shareholders and by royal assent on 31 July 1854 the three companies merged and became the North Eastern Railway; with 703 route miles (1,131 route km) of line, becoming the largest railway company in the country.

A curve connecting the line with the former GNER line at Northallerton was opened on 1 January 1856, and until 1901 Harrogate to Stockton trains were diverted via Thirsk and Northallerton, the line via Pickhill being operated as a branch. The former Leeds Northern station at Northallerton closed that year. The former Leeds Northern and York and North Midland lines in Harrogate were connected, the permission being given by the North Eastern Railway (Harrogate Branches) Act 1859 (22 & 23 Vict. c. c) on 8 August 1859. The station at Brunswick was replaced by the current Harrogate railway station on a new line that branched from the Y&NMR line in town to the former Leeds Northern line north of Starbeck. Another new line, connecting from north of Pannal station to end of Crimple Viaduct, gave the former Leeds Northern Line access to this station.

As a result of the Railways Act 1921, on 1 January 1923 the North Eastern Railway became part of the London and North Eastern Railway (LNER). Britain's railways were nationalised on 1 January 1948 and the former York, Newcastle and Berwick lines were placed under the control of British Railways.

== Legacy ==
The Harrogate Line follows the former Leeds and Thirsk Line from Leeds to Pannal via the Bramhope Tunnel and crosses the River Wharfe on the Arthington Viaduct. It joins the former Y&NMR Line and crosses the Crimple Viaduct. Services pass over the link between the 1882 Harrogate station and Starbeck station before taking the branch and crossing the Nidd Viaduct at Knaresborough and the E&WYJR to York.

The direct line between Pannal and Starbeck closed in 1951 and the line between Melmerby and Thirsk closed in 1959. The former Y&NMR Line to Church Fenton closed on 6 January 1964 to passengers and the Leeds Northern line from Starbeck to Northallerton closed to passengers in 1967, though a limited number of goods trains used this line to Ripon until 1969. Hornbeam Park railway station opened in Harrogate in 1992.

The line from Northallerton to Stockton is still open, and used by passenger services from Middlesbrough and Saltburn to Manchester Airport and Darlington, as well as services between London King's Cross and Sunderland. Eighteen freight trains a day use the route to travel between the East Coast Main Line and Teesside and Tyneside.

The Leeds roundhouse built by the L&TR is proposed to be turned into a sports centre, as of summer 2026.

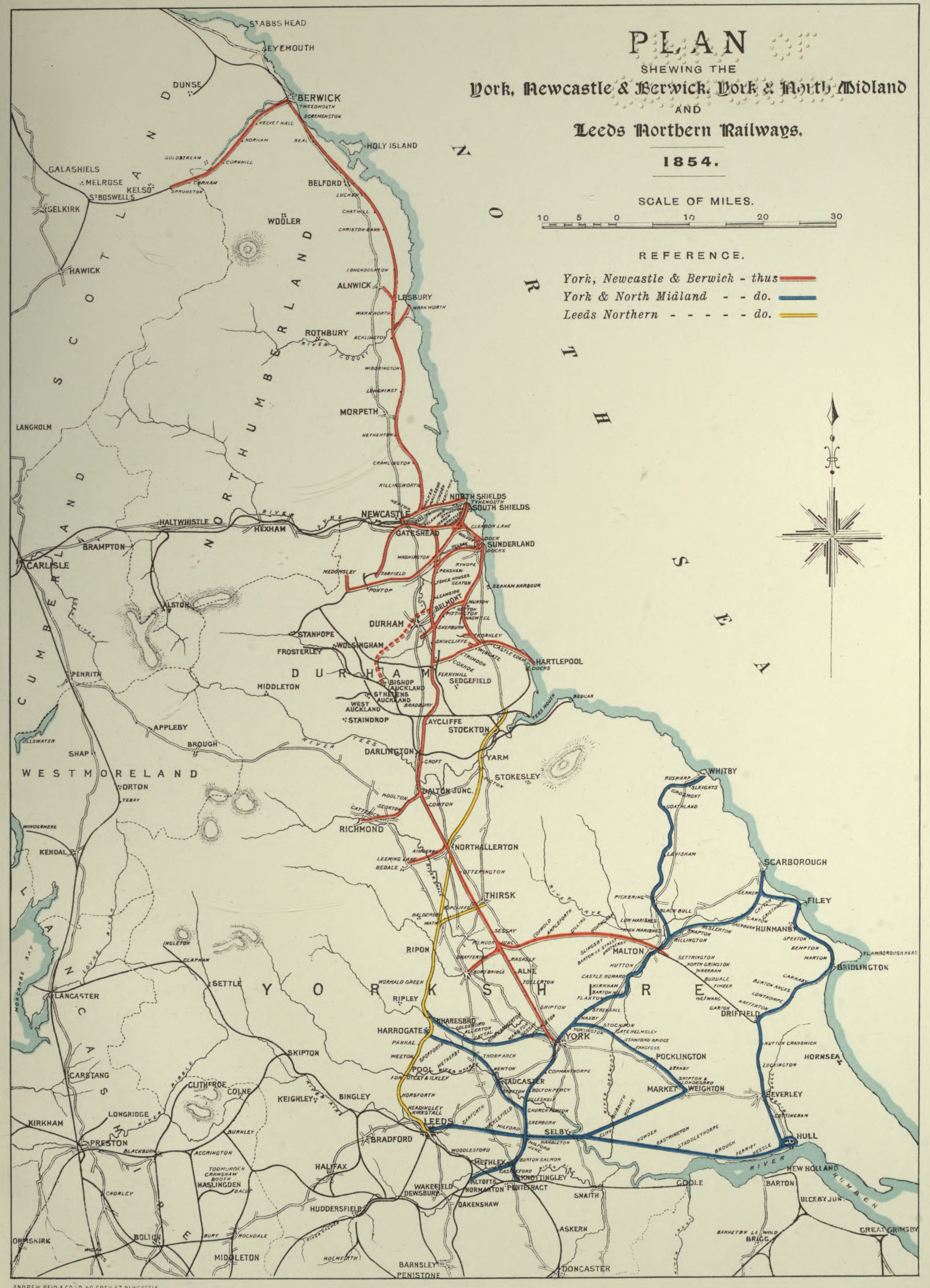
Map of the constituent parts of the North Eastern Railway in 1854. The Leeds Northern Railway is in yellow

== Bibliography ==
- Allen, Cecil J. (1974) [1964]. The North Eastern Railway. Ian Allan. ISBN 0-7110-0495-1.
- Awdry, Christopher (1990). Encyclopaedia of British Railway Companies. Patrick Stephens. ISBN 1-85260-049-7.
- Cobb, Colonel M. H. (2006). The Railways of Great Britain: A Historical Atlas. Ian Allan. ISBN 978-07110-3236-1.
- Hedges, Martin, ed. (1981). 150 years of British Railways. Hamyln. ISBN 0-600-37655-9.
- Hoole, K. (1974). A Regional History of the Railways of Great Britain: Volume IV The North East. David & Charles. ISBN 0715364391.
- Tomlinson, William Weaver (1915). The North Eastern Railway: Its rise and development. Andrew Reid and Company.
- Route Specifications – London North Eastern. Network Rail. 2012. Archived from the original on 1 February 2013.
