= Maltkiln =

Proposed development in North Yorkshire, England

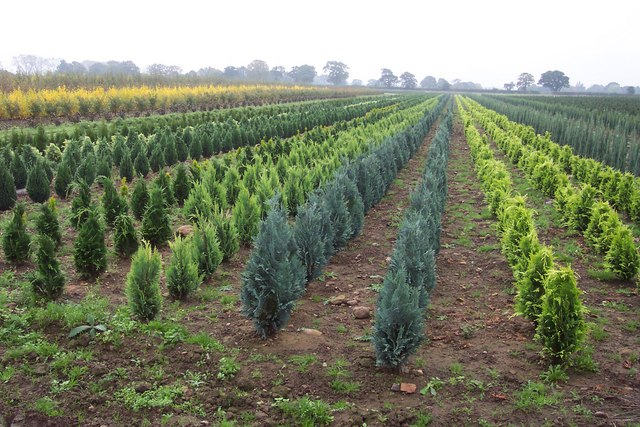
- Tree nursery, Cattal; this will be redeveloped as part of the Maltkiln project

Project
- Status: Planned
- Developer: Oakgate

Physical features
- Major buildings: 3,000+

Location
- Location within North Yorkshire
- Coordinates: 53.992°N 1.316°W
- Country: England
- County: North Yorkshire

Area
  - Total: 69 ha (170 acres)

Maltkiln is a proposed town-sized garden-village development centred around Cattal railway station in North Yorkshire, England. The development is just south of the A59 road, with the mostly single-track railway from Harrogate to York running through its centre. Originally set for up to 4,000 homes, one of the developer's main land-agreements expired in late 2022, leaving the final form of the development uncertain. the project was later scaled down to provide 3,000 homes instead of 4,000.

== Background ==
A report from 2019 detailed that the Harrogate borough consisted of 160,000 people living in almost 67,200 homes. (Note: The report was compiled in 2019, but used data from 2013 and 2015 when calculating population statistics) By the year 2030, the population across the district is expected to increase to 170,000. (Note: In 2023, the Harrogate borough, along with the other district councils across North Yorkshire (Craven, Hambleton, Richmondshire, Ryedale, Scarborough, and Selby, were amalgamated into the North Yorkshire County Council.) The Harrogate Local Plan, which was adopted in March 2020, called for the building of 13,377 new homes (637 homes per annum over 21 years). One of the proposals was the building of a new village at Flaxby, close to the junction of the A1(M) with the A59. However, the then Harrogate Borough Council pressed ahead with Maltkiln as the preferred option.

== Development ==
The location of "The Hammertons" for a new development to satisfy the housing needs of the Harrogate District, has been identified as the best place in terms of transport links. The Harrogate Local Plan determined that a new development should be an eco-village that was less reliant on car ownership, being located in an area accessible to both Cattal and Hammerton railway stations. The development is slated to cover an area of 64 hectares (160 acres).

Harrogate District's Council development plan stated that the number of affordable homes should be between 20–40% of available housing (600–1,200 homes on the 3,000 home development). However, to keep the project financially viable, the number of affordable homes was dropped to only 20%. Residents of both Cattal and Green Hammerton described the proposal to build the development "utterly devastating". Both villages have only a few hundred residents, and they argued, as did one developer, that the proposal to not site the new village on the former Flaxby Golf Course was flawed. Harrogate Borough Council had stated that the large-scale project will help to prevent more housing being built in the existing villages around the area.

As the plan is not yet approved, there is no start date, however, the development would not be expected to be completed until 2038. Nearly 8,000 residents are expected for the 3,000 homes projected to be built, with two 420-place primary schools, and space set aside for an upper school. In the interim, it is expected that the village would not have enough pupils to demand its own secondary school, but that future provision of one may be necessary, although £10.5 million would be set aside to furnish an expansion at Boroughbridge High School. The development would lead to new local roads leading to the A59, and the removal of level crossings on the Harrogate–York railway, allowing operational improvements on the line. The level crossing at Cattal railway station would remain, but a new pedestrian and cycle bridge would be built. One of the primary schools would be located close to the railway station, whilst the other would be in the south-east of the development next to the sports hub.

In January 2023, one of the major landowners due to sell to the development withdrew from the plan. The developers stated that they would still look to push ahead with the project. In December 2023, North Yorkshire Council agreed to pursue a potential move to compulsorily purchase the land required for the new village. By October 2025, the project was scaled at 3,000 homes, however, 42% of the land needed to start the development was still unavailable to the council to purchase. In November 2025, North Yorkshire Council approved the plan of 3,000 homes, two primary schools, a nursey, healthcare and sports facilities.

== See also ==
- Heronby, a similar new village development near to Escrick
