= Cowthorpe Oak =

Tree in England

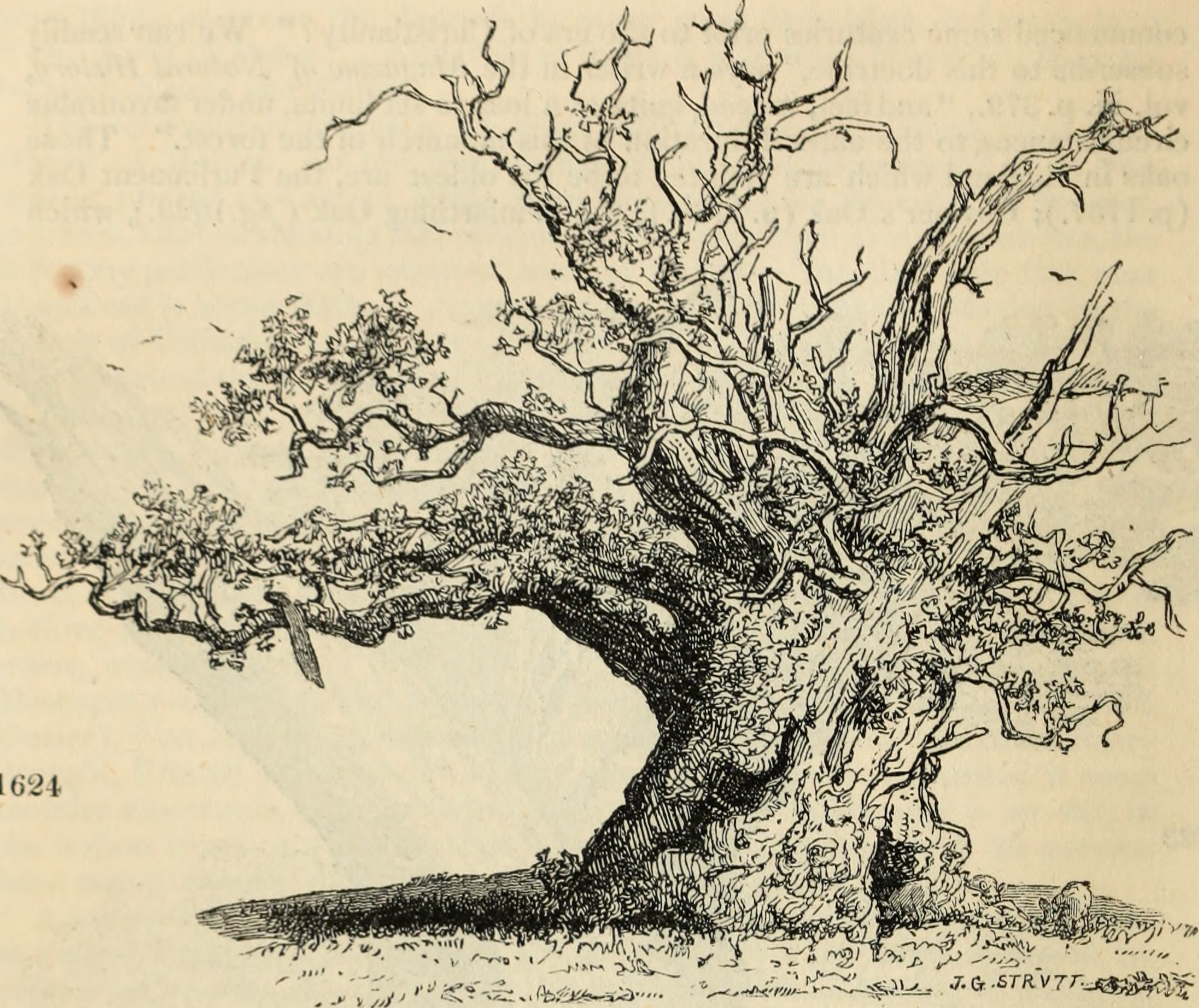
- 1844 depiction of the oak
- Location: Cowthorpe, North Yorkshire
- Date felled: 1950

The Cowthorpe Oak was an oak tree in Cowthorpe, North Yorkshire, England. Renowned for its age and size it was sketched by the artist J. M. W. Turner. At its greatest extent its canopy was said to cover 0.5 acres (2,000 m^{2}) of land. The tree declined in the late 18th century and lost several of its leading branches. By 1822 many of its branches were almost completely rotten and it had been supported with wooden props. The tree fell in 1950, apparently after having been struck by lightning.

== History ==
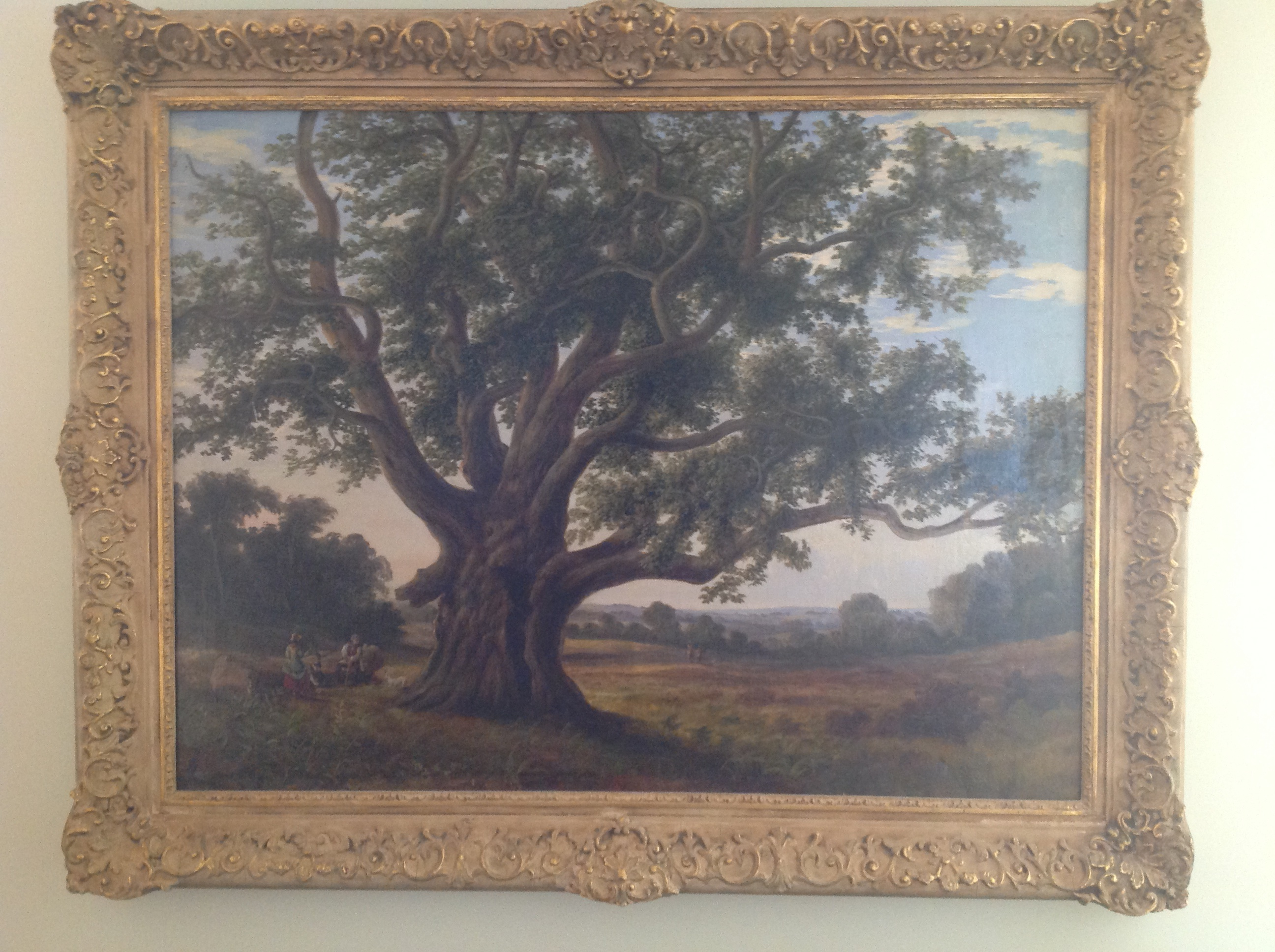
1854 painting of the oak

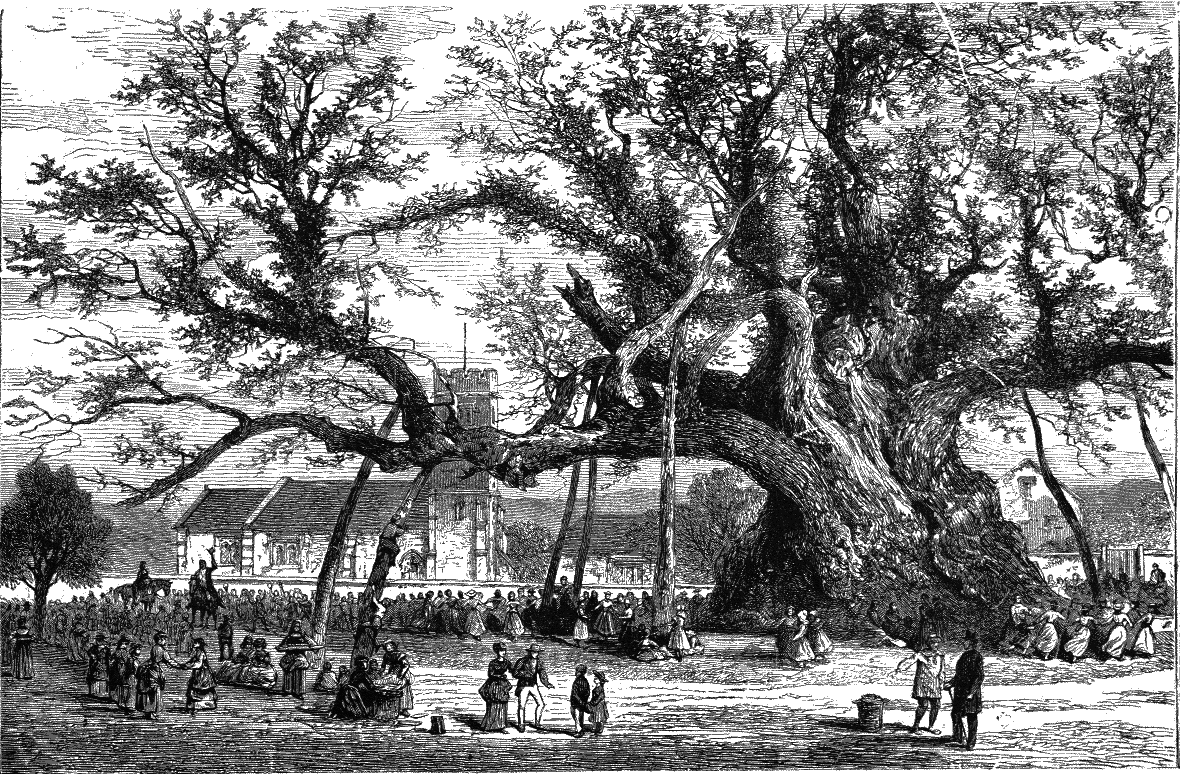
An 1873 depiction of the oak

The oak has been said to date to the era of the Norman Conquest or even early Roman times. It was already ancient when Alexander Hunter, in his 1776 edition of John Evelyn's Sylva, wrote of it, "The dimensions are almost incredible... The foliage is extremely thin, so that the anatomy of the ancient branches may be distinctly seen in the height of summer. When compared to this, all other trees are but children of the forest". Cowthorpe's St Michael's Church was constructed nearby and a public house was named Ye Old Oak Inn after the tree. At its greatest extent its canopy was said to cover 0.5 acres (0.20 ha) of land. In the early 19th century the tree was owned by Charles Stourton, 17th Baron Stourton and then The Honorable Mr Petre. The tree was sketched by J. M. W. Turner.

== Decline and death ==
The tree's leading branch fell in 1718 and was found to be 2 feet (0.61 m) thick and to weigh 5 long tons (5.1 t). It is said to have decayed greatly between 1773 and 1804; in 1794 another leading branch fell, causing alarm to nearby residents. In 1806 its circumference measured at a height of 6 feet (1.8 m) from the ground was 47 feet (14 m) and in 1822 it was measured at 60 feet (18 m) at ground level. By this time many of the branches are said to be completely rotten and held up only by the bark; the leading branch extended some 48 feet (15 m) from the trunk and had been supported by wooden props. The hollow trunk was said to be large enough to hold 70 people, if children were carried on the adults' shoulders.

The Cowthorpe oak was photographed in 1904 and appeared to be in good health, though it was heavily propped. The tree died in 1950, apparently having been struck by lightning. At this time it was said to be England's oldest tree. The remains of the tree were removed by Ian Watson as it had become unsafe.

The tree's lineage survives as several of its acorns were sent to New Zealand to be planted there. One of these, planted at Drury in the 1870s, is now known as the Runciman Oak and has a circumference of almost 5 metres (16 ft) measured at a height of 0.5 metres (1.6 ft) from ground level. The Runciman Oak also has many descendants, planted in an avenue nearby.

== See also ==
- List of Great British Trees
