= Church of the Epiphany, Tockwith =

Church in Tockwith, North Yorkshire, England

Coordinates: 53°57′54″N 1°17′27″W

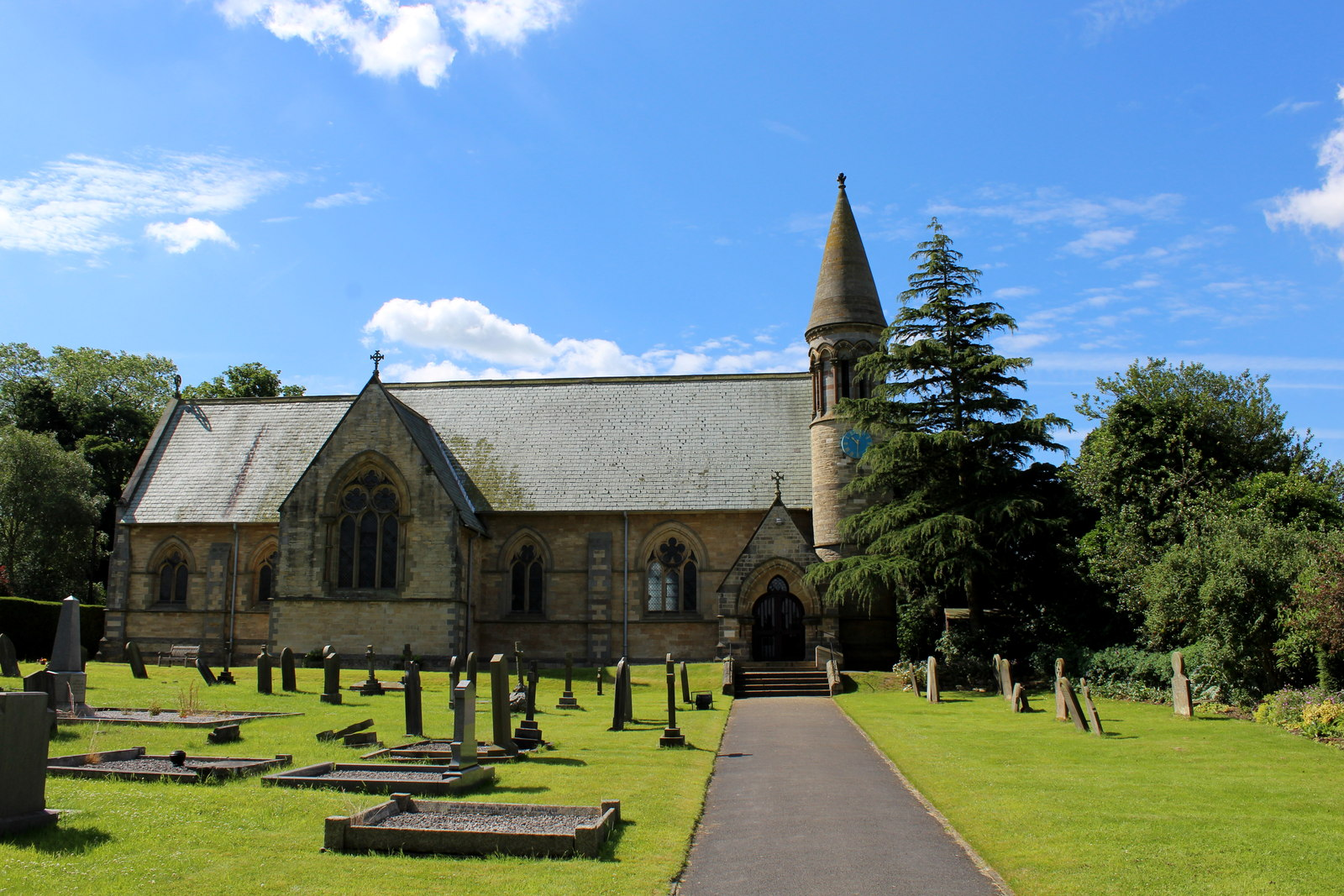
The church, in 2016

The Church of the Epiphany is an Anglican church in Tockwith, a village in North Yorkshire, in England.

Until the mid-19th century, Tockwith was in the parish of St Helen's Church, Bilton-in-Ainsty. Between 1864 and 1866 a church was constructed in the village, to a design by James Mallinson and Thomas Healey. It was given its own parish in 1867, but is now in the joint parish of Marston Moor. The church was grade II listed in 2004.

The church is built of sandstone with a slate roof. It has a cruciform plan, consisting of a nave, a north porch, north and south transepts, a chancel, and a cylindrical bell turret at the southwest corner. The top stage of the turret has an arcade of paired windows alternating with blind panels in banded red and white brick, and it is surmounted by a spire. Inside, there is a panelled vestry at the west end, and both the pulpit and the font are carved on pink and black marble on sandstone bases.

== See also ==
- Listed buildings in Tockwith
