= Cowthorpe =

Village in North Yorkshire, England

Coordinates: 53.966660°N 1.350010°W

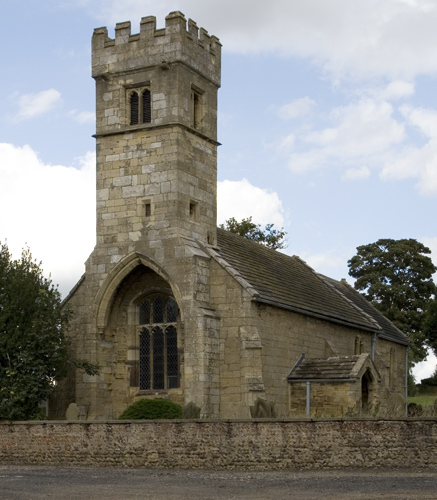
- St Michael's Church, Cowthorpe

- Location within North Yorkshire
- OS grid reference: SE427524
- Civil parish: Tockwith
- Unitary authority: North Yorkshire
- Ceremonial county: North Yorkshire
- Region: Yorkshire and the Humber
- Country: England
- Sovereign state: United Kingdom
- Post town: WETHERBY
- Postcode district: LS22
- Police: North Yorkshire
- Fire: North Yorkshire
- Ambulance: Yorkshire

Cowthorpe is a village in the civil parish of Tockwith, in North Yorkshire, England. It is situated 3 miles (4.8 km) north of Wetherby, 10 miles (16 km) east of Harrogate, 7 miles (11 km) from Knaresborough and 13.5 miles (21.7 km) from York.

In 1931 the parish had a population of 103. On 1 April 1937 the parish was abolished and merged with Tockwith.

Until 1974 it was part of the West Riding of Yorkshire. From 1974 to 2023 it was part of the Borough of Harrogate, it is now administered by the unitary North Yorkshire Council.

== History ==
The name of Cowthorpe comes from Old Norse and is a combination of a personal name Koli and þorp (which means settlement or outlying hamlet).

The village lies on a minor road that connects it with North Deighton (and the A168) to the west and Tockwith in the east. It is bordered by the River Nidd to the north with bridges crossing the Nidd at either Walshford in the west, or Cattal Bridge in the east.

== St Michael's Church ==
St Michael's Church in the village is a Grade I listed building, built by a Brian Roucliffe, and consecrated in 1458. In the choir, on a large flat stone, are the effigies, in brass, of a man and his wife, bearing betwixt them the model of a church, and supposed, from the inscription, likewise in brass, now scarce legible, to be in memory of the Founder and his wife.

== The Cowthorpe Oak ==
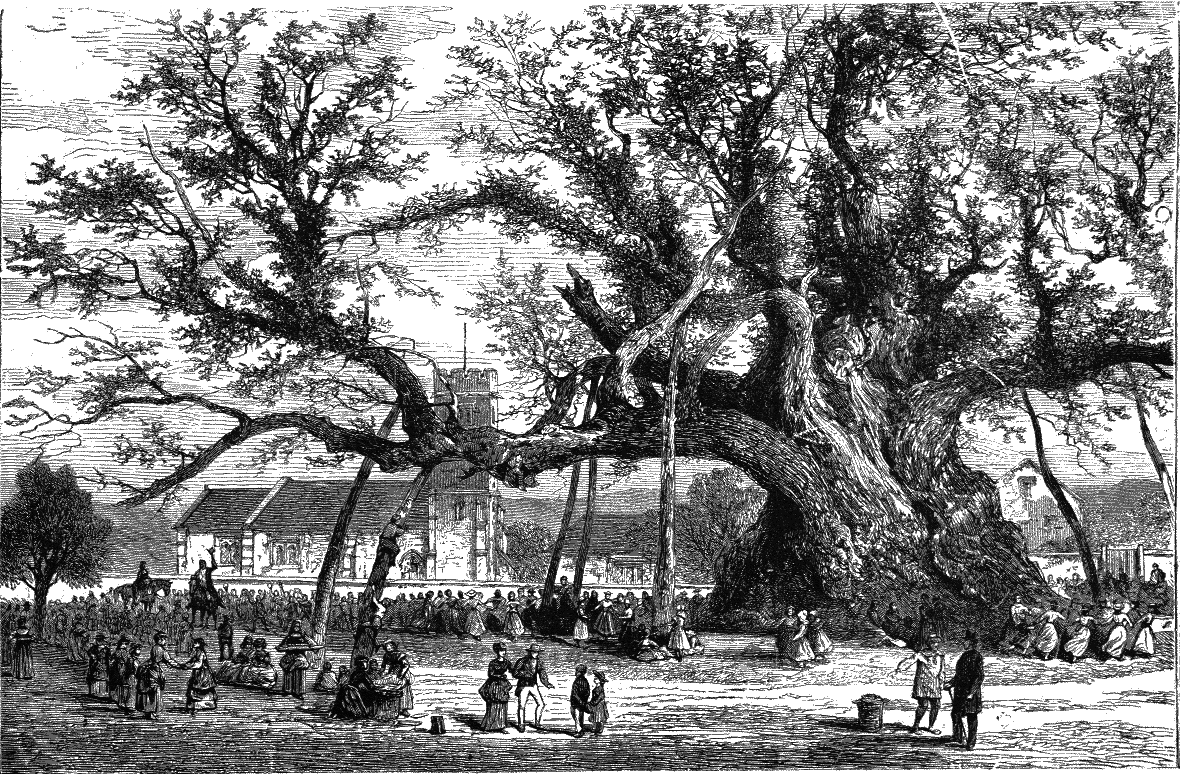
The Cowthorpe Oak

Cowthorpe was the home of an enormous tree, the Cowthorpe Oak. Its circumference was 60 feet (18 m); its principal limb (which was propped) extended 48 feet (15 m) from the bole. The tree was decaying by the 19th century; tradition speaks of its being in decay for many generations. "Compared with this," says Dr. Hunter, in Evelyn's Silva, "all other trees are children of the Forest." According to an early history of Knaresborough, "The leading branch fell, by a storm, in the year 1718; which, being measured with accuracy, was found to contain five tons and two feet of wood. Before this accidental mutilation, its branches are said to have extended their shade over half an acre of ground; thus constituting, in a single tree, almost a wood itself".

Langdale's Topographical Dictionary of Yorkshire (1822) records that "This venerable oak is decaying fast, the trunk and several of the branches appearing to be completely rotten, except the bark; tradition speaks of its being in decay for many generations. The intermixture of foliage amongst the dead branches, show how sternly this giant struggles for life, and how reluctantly it surrenders to all conquering time". However, the tree was still flourishing in part as late as 1906: it was photographed in that year, and 'the tree [was] still in good shape, with a lot of strong branches and foliage, although many of the branches are now propped up...the oak still puts forth leaves and periodically sports a few acorns.'

The tree, which was painted by J. M. W. Turner, finally died in 1950 and there is now little or no trace of it.

== See also ==
- Listed buildings in Tockwith
