= Escrick ring =

Ancient British artifact

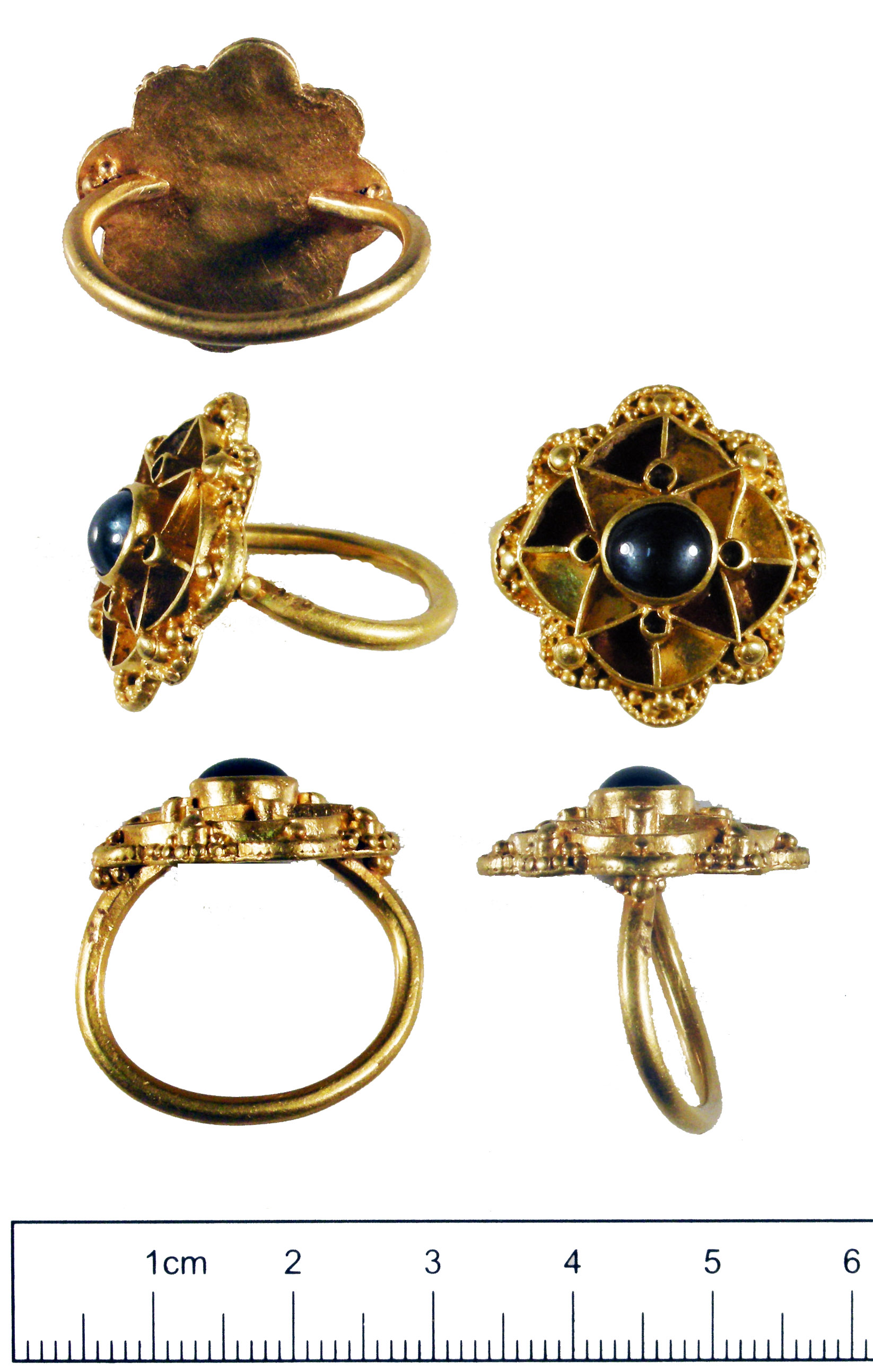
- The Escrick ring
- Period/culture: Anglo-Saxon
- Discovered: 2009; Escrick, North Yorkshire
- Present location: Medieval Gallery, Yorkshire Museum, York
- Identification: YORYM-715F42

The Escrick ring is a gold finger ring set with a large blue gemstone and red glass cloisonné dating to the 5th to 6th century AD. It was discovered on 22 May 2009 in a field near Escrick, North Yorkshire by a metal detectorist and reported via the Portable Antiquities Scheme. Following a successful funding campaign, the ring was acquired by the Yorkshire Museum for £35,000.

== Description ==
The Escrick ring is a gold finger ring set with a large blue gemstone and red glass cloisonné, measuring 23.1 mm in diameter across the bezel and 25.5 mm across the hoop. It weighs 10.2 g. The central cabochon gem is surrounded by four triangular cells. Where these meet, small round cells have been set. Glass slips are still present in one of the triangular cells and four of the interstitial spaces. The square frame of the bezel is set onto an eight-lobed base. The lobes are alternately embellished by gold granules and by beaded wire enclosing further gold granules. Where this platform meets the round-sectioned hoop, three further gold granules are set. The underside of the lobed platform is plain. Analysis of the metal using X-ray fluorescence indicated a gold content of approximately 90%, a silver content of 8%, and a copper content of 2%. The gemstone was identified as a sapphire using Raman spectroscopy.

== Significance ==
In January 2013 experts from UK universities gathered in York at a conference organised by the University and the Yorkshire Museum to discuss the nature and significance of the ring. The ring was subsequently argued to date from the 5th or 6th century – not the 10th or 11th as originally believed. Its origin was attributed to Europe, possibly France, and it was thought to have belonged to a king, leader or royal consort – not a bishop, which was also a previous theory.

== Public display ==
The ring was acquired by the Yorkshire Museum in 2011 for £35,000 and subsequently placed on public display. The money was raised with grants of £10,000 from the Art Fund, £10,000 from the MLA/V&A Purchase Grant Fund, £10,000 from the Headley Trust and £1,000 from the York Philosophical Society. Since 2017 it has featured as one of the key objects in the exhibition 'Medieval York: Capital of the North'.

== See also ==
- Anglo-Saxon art
- Kingdom of Northumbria
