= Listed buildings in Tockwith =

Tockwith is a civil parish in the county of North Yorkshire, England. It contains ten listed buildings that are recorded in the National Heritage List for England. Of these, one is listed at Grade I, the highest of the three grades, and the others are at Grade II, the lowest grade. The parish contains the villages of Tockwith and Cowthorpe, and the surrounding countryside, and the listed buildings consist of houses, farmhouses and two churches.

== Key ==
Grade	Criteria
I	Buildings of exceptional interest, sometimes considered to be internationally important
II	Buildings of national importance and special interest

== Buildings ==
Name and location	Photograph	Date	Notes	Grade
The Thatched Cottage; 53.96517°N 1.28790°W		16th century (probable)	The house has a timber framed core, it was enclosed in brick in the 17th century, and has a thatched roof. There are two storeys and attics, and three bays. On the front is a porch, the windows on the lower two floors are tripartite sashes in architraves, and on the attics are three-light casement windows under swept dormers. Inside, there is remaining timber framing.	II
Cowthorpe Hall Farmhouse; 53.96948°N 1.35175°W		17th century	The house is in brown-orange brick at the front, in stone at the rear and sides, with limestone quoins, a projecting string course, cemented eaves and a purple slate roof. There are two storeys and four bays, and a rear wing. On the front is a porch with double doors, and sash windows. On the right return are two mullioned windows, one blocked, and a blocked moulded window.	II
St Michael's Church, Cowthorpe; 53.96857°N 1.35059°W		1456–58	The church, which was restored in the 19th century, is built in limestone and sandstone and has stone slate roofs. It consists of a nave, a south porch, a chancel, and a west tower partly enclosed by the nave. The tower has three stages, and two buttresses with a large central arch containing a three-light mullioned and transomed window. Above is a circular window on the south side, string courses, two-and three-light bell openings, and an embattled parapet. Most of the windows are in Perpendicular style.	I
Brewery Farmhouse; 53.96522°N 1.28823°W		Early to mid-18th century	The house is in red-brown brick, with a projecting floor band, a dentilled eaves cornice, and a pantile roof with one course of stone slates. There are two storeys, and fronts of three and two bays. Steps lead up to a doorway with pilasters and a fanlight. The windows are horizontally sliding sashes, those on the ground floor with flat stretcher arches.	II
Skewkirk Hall; 53.98126°N 1.28185°W		18th century	The house is in reddish-brown brick, with a projecting floor band, a modillion eaves cornice, and a hipped grey slate roof. There are two storeys and four bays. On the front is a stone porch with four Ionic columns, an entablature, a cornice, and a balustrade with elaborately carved panels. The doorway has an architrave, and the windows are sashes in architraves with flat stretcher arches.	II
Pipe Hall; 53.96514°N 1.28767°W		Late 18th to early 19th century	A muniment room converted into a house in red-brown brick, with dentilled eaves and a hipped stone slate roof. There are two storeys and a basement, fronts of one bay, and a lower two-storey three-bay range to the right. Paired flights of steps lead up to a doorway with fluted pilasters, a divided fanlight, and an open dentilled pediment. The lower range has a doorway, small-paned windows and external steps. On the front facing the road are sash windows in architraves with flat stretcher arches.	II
Montague House; 53.96529°N 1.28651°W		Early 19th century	The house is in red-brown brick, with a stepped eaves cornice, and a pantile roof with narrow shaped kneelers and stone gable coping. There are two storeys and two bays. The central doorway has attached columns, imposts with paterae, a fanlight, and an open pediment on deep cornices. The windows are sashes, those on the ground floor under cambered brick arches.	II
Little Manor; 53.96549°N 1.28859°W		Early to mid-19th century	The house is in cream-brown brick, with dressings in stone and brick, rusticated stone quoins, an eaves band, and a stone slate roof. There are two storeys and three bays. The central doorway has pilasters, and a fanlight under a round brick arch. The windows are sashes in architraves, those on the ground floor with red brick stretchers to flat arches.	II
Poplar Lodge; 53.96583°N 1.29216°W		Early to mid-19th century	The house is in cream-brown brick with a hipped grey slate roof. There are two storeys and three bays. Steps lead up to a central doorway with pilasters and a pediment. The windows are sashes with slightly cambered arches.	II
Church of the Epiphany; 53.96516°N 1.29096°W		1866	The church is in sandstone with a slate roof. It has a cruciform plan, consisting of a nave, a north porch, north and south transepts, a chancel, and a cylindrical bell turret at the southwest corner. The top stage of the turret has an arcade of paired windows alternating with blind panels in banded red and white brick, and it is surmounted by a spire.	II
