= Flaxby =

Village and civil parish in North Yorkshire, England

Coordinates: 54.01509°N 1.39796°W

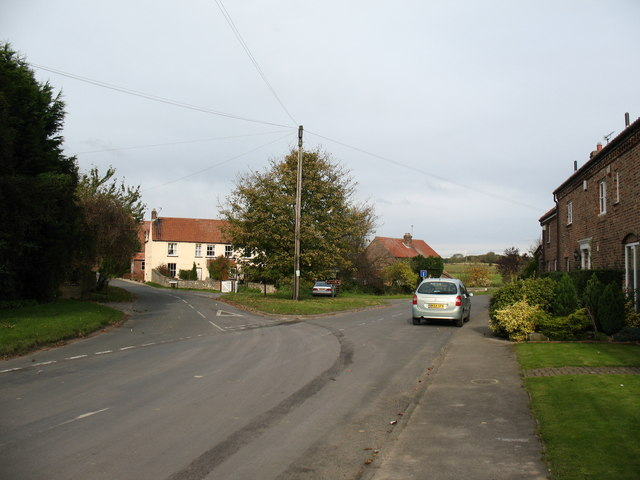
- Flaxby

- Location within North Yorkshire
- Population: 156 (2011)
- OS grid reference: SE395578
- Civil parish: Flaxby
- Unitary authority: North Yorkshire
- Ceremonial county: North Yorkshire
- Region: Yorkshire and the Humber
- Country: England
- Sovereign state: United Kingdom
- Post town: KNARESBOROUGH
- Postcode district: HG5
- Police: North Yorkshire
- Fire: North Yorkshire
- Ambulance: Yorkshire

Flaxby is a village and civil parish in the county of North Yorkshire, England. It is close to the A1(M) motorway and 2 miles (3.2 km) east of Knaresborough.

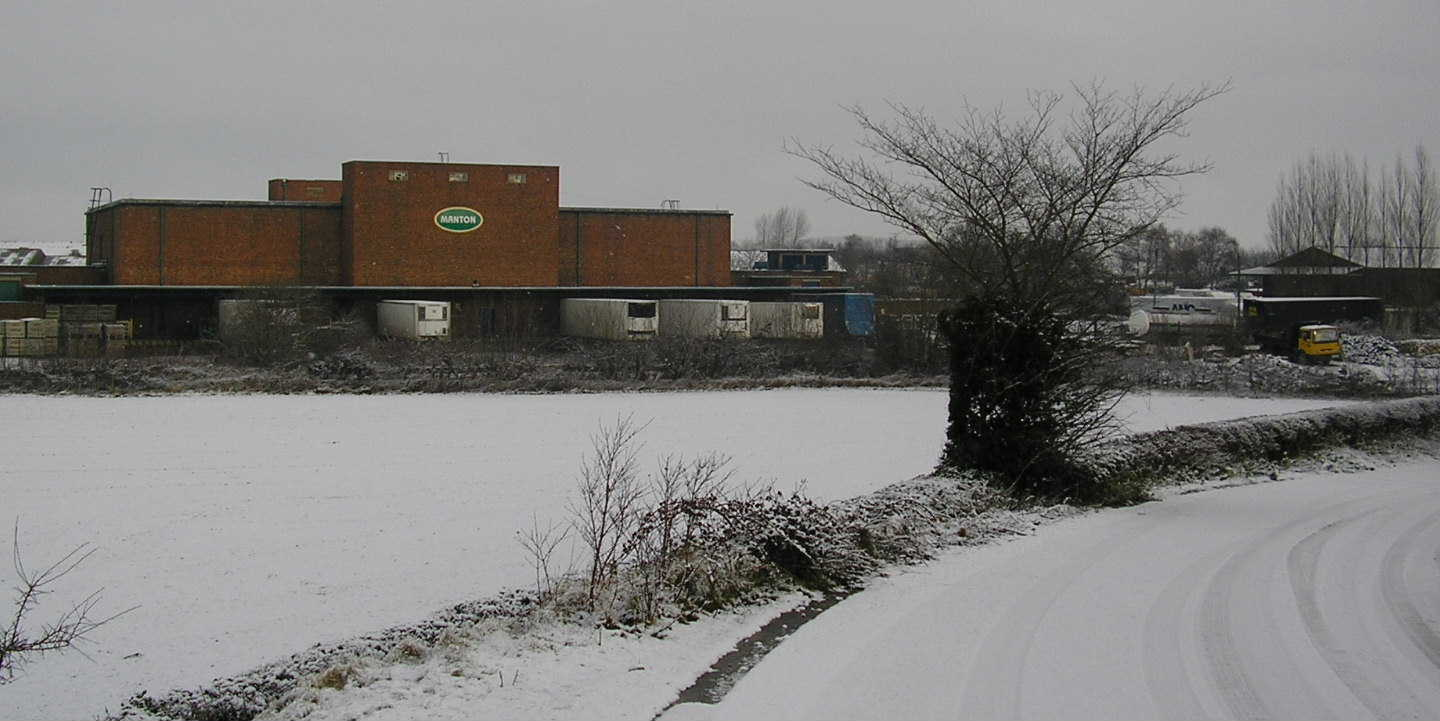
Goldsborough Cold Store, one of forty built during the Second World War at road and rail links, still in use as a storage depot

Flaxby was once part of the wapentake of Claro. Until 1974 it was part of the West Riding of Yorkshire. From 1974 to 2023 it was part of the Borough of Harrogate, it is now administered by the unitary North Yorkshire Council.

It is also part of the ecclesiastical parish of Goldsborough (St Mary).

In 1994, an Early Iron Age farmstead of the 7th–6th centuries BC was discovered by archaeologists, but the site was abandoned until the late Roman period.

The name Flaxby derives from the Old English personal name Flatr and the Old Norse bȳ meaning 'village'.

Proposals have been put forward to develop the land to the east of Flaxby, north of the A59 road and west of the A1(M) motorway into a new town called Flaxby Park. The developers have announced their intention to build 2,500 - 3,000 homes on 440 acres (180 ha) of land that would also see a primary school, a medical centre, leisure facilities and numerous shops and bars. The development would also include a bus park and ride system with the possibility of a new railway station on the York to Harrogate line. A railway station has already been proposed at Flaxby Moor (south of the A59) but in 2014, a feasibility study of new stations predicted a low demand of passenger numbers from a new station on the line.

In 2017, Harrogate Borough Council opted to put forward a housing scheme at nearby Cattal called Maltkiln, instead of the development at Flaxby.

Modular house-builder Ilke Homes built a factory at Flaxby which was opened by Communities Secretary James Brokenshire in December 2018. The factory was closed in June 2023 just before the company went into administration with the loss of over 1,100 jobs.

== See also ==
- Listed buildings in Flaxby
