= Listed buildings in Cattal =

Cattal is a civil parish in the county of North Yorkshire, England. It contains three listed buildings that are recorded in the National Heritage List for England. All the listed buildings are designated at Grade II, the lowest of the three grades, which is applied to "buildings of national importance and special interest". The parish contains the village of Cattal and the surrounding area, and the listed buildings consist of a road bridge and two houses.

== Buildings ==
Name and location	Photograph	Date	Notes
Cattal Bridge; 53.98018°N 1.31882°W		c.1700	The bridge carries Cattal Moor Lane over the River Nidd. It is in stone, and consists of three round arches with chamfered moulding. The bridge has triangular cutwaters, the piers rising to form refuges, and the parapet has flat coping.
Manor House and former smithy 53.98125°N 1.31868°W		Late 18th century	The house and smithy, later combined, are in limestone, and have a pantile roof with stone coping and shaped kneelers. The house has two storeys, a symmetrical front of three bays, and a continuous rear outshut. Steps lead to a central wrought iron gabled porch. The windows are horizontally-sliding sashes with incised lintels. To the right is a lean-to former cattle shed, and to the left is the single-storey former smithy.
Horbatt House; 53.98140°N 1.31344°W	—	Early 19th century	A house with a chapel, later combined, in brown brick with a blue slate roof. There are two storeys and four bays. On the front is a lean-to porch and a doorway with a fanlight, the windows are sashes in architraves, and the openings have incised splayed lintels.
