= St Michael's Church, Cowthorpe =

Coordinates: 53.9685°N 1.3506°W

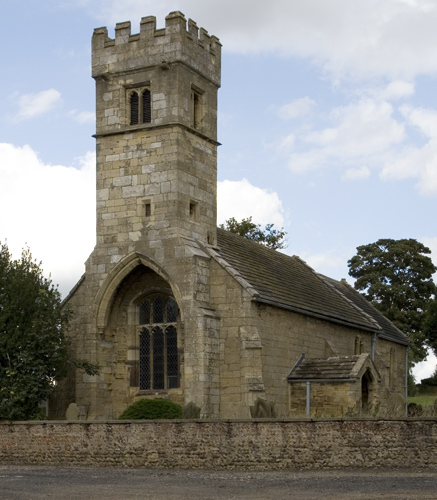
- St Michael's Church, Cowthorpe, from the southwest

- Location in North Yorkshire
- OS grid reference: SE 426 526
- Location: Cowthorpe, North Yorkshire
- Country: England
- Denomination: Anglican
- Website: Churches Conservation Trust

History
- Founder: Sir Bryan Roucliffe
- Dedication: Saint Michael

Architecture
- Functional status: Redundant
- Heritage designation: Grade I
- Designated: 30 March 1966
- Architectural type: Church
- Style: Gothic
- Groundbreaking: 1456
- Completed: 1458

Specifications
- Materials: Sandstone and limestone, stone slate roofs

St Michael's Church is a redundant church in the village of Cowthorpe, North Yorkshire, England. It is recorded in the National Heritage List for England as a designated Grade I listed building, and is under the care of the Churches Conservation Trust.

== History ==
The church was built in 1456–58 for Sir Bryan Roucliffe (or Brian Rouclyff), who was a lawyer and Baron of the Exchequer. He inherited the manor of Cowthorpe from his uncle, John Burgh. In 1456 Sir Bryan was granted permission by the Archbishop of York to build a new church to replace an old chapel near the River Nidd. It is thought that some of the sandstone blocks in this church came from the old chapel. The church was restored in the 19th century; this was a limited restoration and consisted of renewing some window tracery, and restoring the roof. St Michael's was declared redundant on 1 November 1975, and was vested in the Trust on 11 October 1977.

== Architecture ==
=== Exterior ===
St Michael's is constructed in sandstone and limestone, with stone slate roofs. Its plan consists of a four-bay nave with a south porch, a two-bay chancel and a west tower. The tower is partly incorporated in the west bay of the nave. The architectural style is Perpendicular. The tower is in three stages and has two buttresses. On its west side is a large arch containing a three-light mullioned and transomed window. In the middle stage on the south side is a circular window. There is a string course between the middle and top stages. The top stage contains a three-light bell opening on the east side, and two-light windows on the other sides. On top of the tower is a battlemented parapet. The structure of the tower has been described as "military looking", as being "unusual" and "similar to that of castle gatehouses of the period", and as "more like a castle fortification than a religious symbol" and "reminiscent of military gatehouse construction in the 15th century". The arch "seems more suited to a cathedral than a small country church". There are Perpendicular windows in the nave and the chancel, the east window having three lights. In the north wall is a blocked door.

=== Interior ===
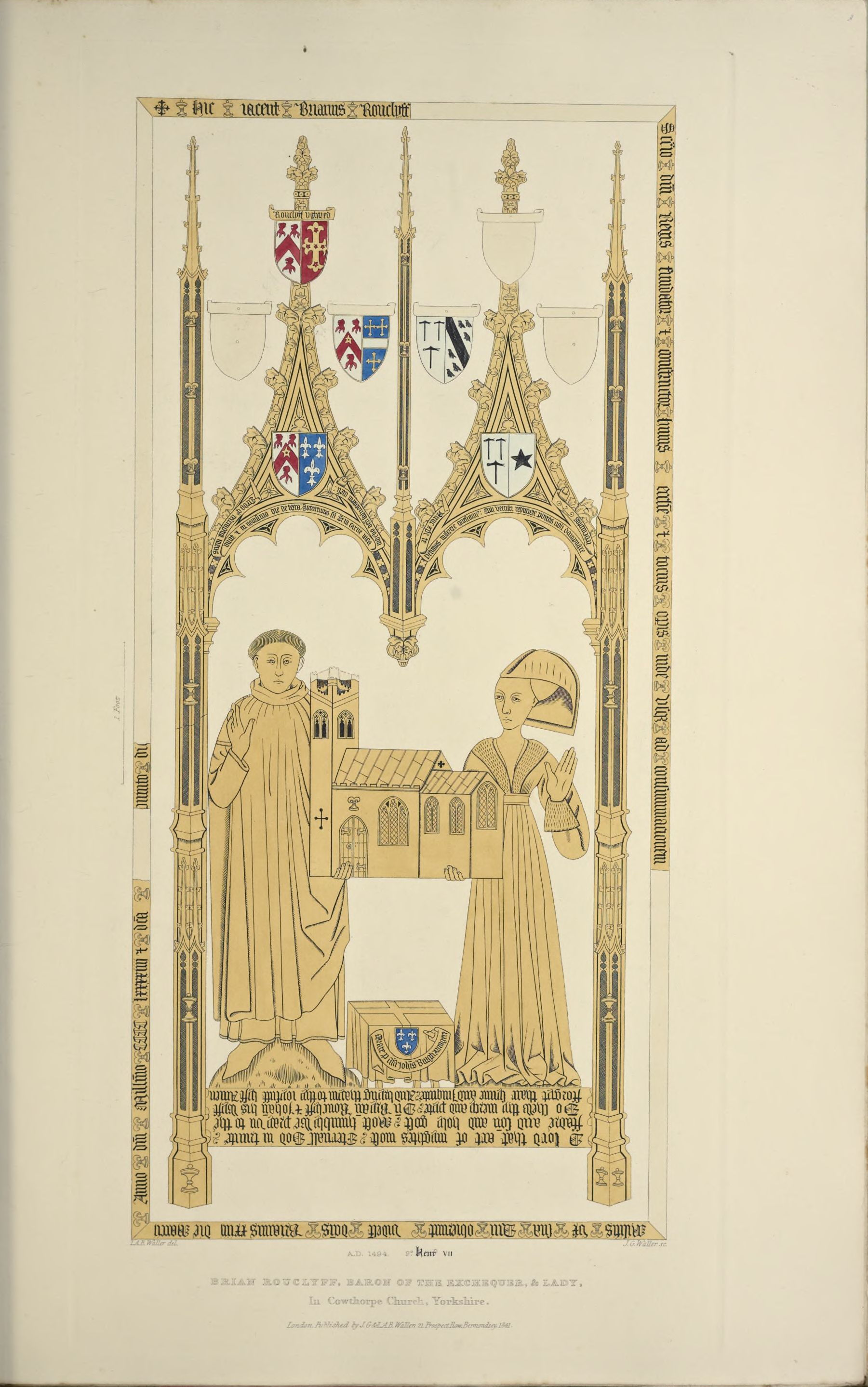
Memorial brass to Sir Brian Rouclyff and his wife Joan. Engraving made about 1840, before the theft and damage.

Inside the church are original fittings. The font is a square bowl carved with tracery and family shields, standing on a cruciform stem and an octagonal base. The Easter Sepulchre is a rare example of its type and consists of a carved wooden chest with a canopy. In the windows are fragments of medieval heraldic stained glass. On the north wall of the chancel are the remains of a brass memorial to the memory of Sir Bryan and his wife. They were stolen from the church in about 1850, and following their recovery they were remounted in the church in 1886. There are three bells, one of which commemorates Sir Bryan, and which bears an inscription in English. It is one of the earliest bells with an inscription in English rather than in Latin.

== See also ==
- Grade I listed buildings in North Yorkshire (district)
- Listed buildings in Tockwith
- List of churches preserved by the Churches Conservation Trust in Northern England
