= Heronby =

Proposed development in Yorkshire, England

Project
- Status: Planned
- Owner: Escrick Park Estate
- Website: www.escrick.com/projects

Physical features
- Major buildings: 3,500–3,800 homes

Location
- Location within North Yorkshire
- Coordinates (Heron Wood): 53.864°N 1.062°W
- Country: England
- County: North Yorkshire

Area
  - Total: 241 ha (600 acres)

Heronby is a proposed development village close to Escrick, in North Yorkshire, England. The plans detail a village of between 3,500 and 3,800 houses with a shopping area, clustered around an ancient woodland. The development has been criticised for its lack of transport, the effect on the ancient woodland, and the population numbers living there, which objectors state would make it a town, not a village.

== Background ==
The development of Heronby is named after Heron Wood, the place where the proposed village would be built. The site is south of the village of Stillingfleet, and would cover an area of between 70 hectares (170 acres) and 241 hectares (600 acres). The proposal was put forward in 2021, and was adopted into a planning blueprint to provide new homes in the area by 2040. However, due to concerns over transport issues, the proposal for Heronby was removed from the plan in 2023.

Besides the homes, the plan detailed the building of two primary schools, a high school, park, high street and market area. The village is slated to have up to 386 homes built over the course of each year of the project, and the development is claimed to sustain 12,300 full-time jobs.

== Objections ==
Four local communities banded together to form the Halt Heronby Action Group. Villagers and parish councils in Deighton, Escrick, Riccall and Stillingfleet have said that the 3,500-home development would mean a population of 12,000, which they stated was not a village, but a town bigger than Tadcaster. They also objected to the plan on account of the damage it would cause to local woodland.

In October 2022, the City of York Council released a report criticising the plan, stating it would add extra pressure on their area, as it was only 1-kilometre (0.62 mi) south of their boundary. The report claimed that the impact upon local services, and the extra traffic on the A19, had not been taken into account by the developers. York Council stated that the plans for a new secondary school within the development would "not materialise", meaning spaces at Fulford School would be at a premium, meaning "children who live in York could be displaced".

In February 2024, North Yorkshire Council "paused" the development due to transport issues, but the developers stated that the project was still on the table, whilst council planners consider the next steps to take.

== See also ==
- Maltkiln, a similar new village development near to Kirk Hammerton
