= Cattal Bridge =

Bridge in Cattal, North Yorkshire, England

Coordinates: 53°58′49″N 1°19′08″W

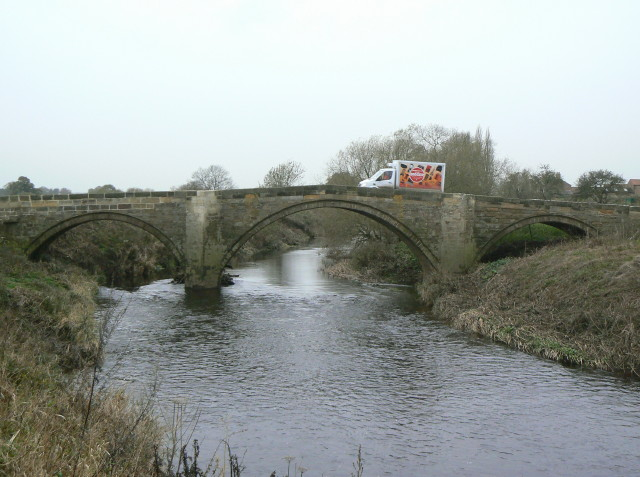
The bridge, in 2009

Cattal Bridge is a historic road bridge in Cattal, a village in North Yorkshire, in England.

The Roman road later known as Rudgate, connecting Tadcaster and Aldborough, crossed the River Nidd at Cattal, though it is not known whether there was a bridge or a ford. A ford was in use in the Mediaeval period, being first recorded during the reign of Henry III of England. A timber bridge was in existence by the mid-16th century, when it was recorded by John Leland.

The current bridge was built at the end of the 18th century, when embankments were constructed on the river. It is 150 metres upstream from the line of the Roman road. The north arch and parapets have been extensively repaired, but it has never been strengthened, and so retains its original features better than most other bridges of similar date. The bridge underwent a £78,000 repair project in 2011, during which careful measures were taken to maintain the original character and shape of the bridge.

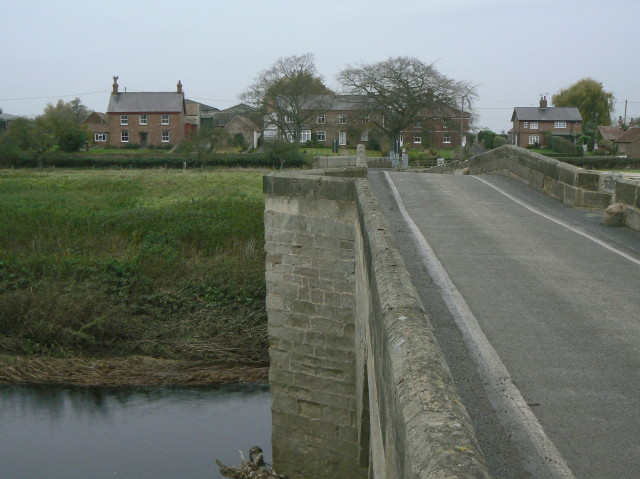
Deck of the bridge, in 2009

The bridge carries Cattal Moor Lane over the River Nidd. It is built of limestone, and consists of three round arches with chamfered moulding. The central arch is 15 metres wide, and the others each span 11 metres. The bridge has triangular cutwaters, the piers rising to form refuges, and the parapet has flat coping.

The bridge was made a scheduled monument in 1976, and a Grade II listed building in 1985.

== See also ==
- Listed buildings in Cattal
