= RAF Marston Moor =

Former RAF base in Yorkshire, England

RAF Marston Moor RAF Tockwith
- Tockwith, North Yorkshire in England
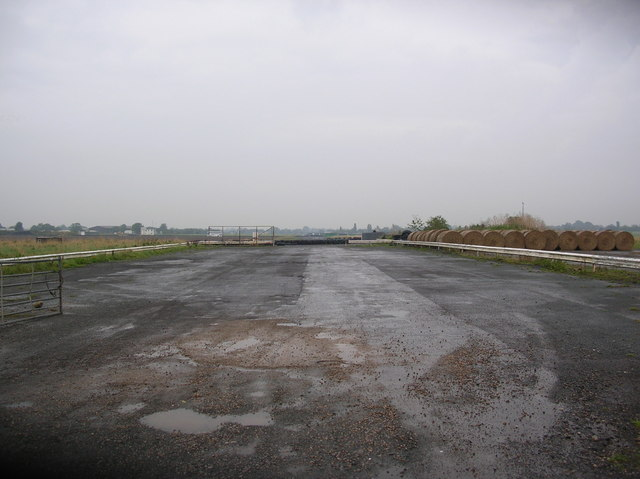

Site information
- Type: Royal Air Force station 41 Base HQ 1943-44; 74 Base HQ 1944-45
- Code: MA
- Owner: Air Ministry
- Operator: Royal Air Force
- Controlled by: RAF Bomber Command * No. 4 Group RAF * No. 7 (T) Group RAF

Location
- Shown within North Yorkshire
- Coordinates: 53°57′42″N 001°18′16″W

Site history
- Built: 1940/41
- Built by: John Laing & Son Ltd
- In use: 1941–1949

Garrison information
- Past commanders: Group Captain Leonard Cheshire

Airfield information
- Elevation: 21 metres (69 ft) AMSL
Runways
Direction	Length and surface
06/24	5,955 feet (1,815 m) Concrete
11/29	4,142 feet (1,262 m) Concrete
01/17	3,896 feet (1,188 m) Concrete

Royal Air Force Marston Moor or more simply RAF Marston Moor is a former Royal Air Force station located near Tockwith, North Yorkshire, England. It was operational during the Second World War and was originally called RAF Tockwith, but confusion with RAF Topcliffe led to the name change.

RAF Marston Moor was opened on 11 November 1941, the airfield and RAF Church Fenton were the closest airfields to West Yorkshire and would act as a defence should Leeds be attacked. As it happens Leeds was seldom bombed.

In 1943, Group Captain Leonard Cheshire was made the station commander. He requested to be transferred to the command of 617 Squadron in November 1943, a vacancy created by the loss of George Holden in July of that year. The move required him to voluntarily step down in rank from group captain to wing commander, which he did.

Marston Moor was also in control of RAF Rufforth and RAF Riccall.

== Based units ==
Work on the site was given authority in September 1940, and the base was opened in November 1941. Living accommodation (the billets) was some distance from the operational areas of the base, so bicycles had to be issued to service personnel. The base was located to the west of the village of Tockwith (after which it was originally supposed to be named), south of the River Nidd, and north of the B1224 road. The intent had been for an operational bomber squadron to move in, but instead, the site was allocated to training.

During the Second World War the airfield was used by the 165 Heavy Conversion Unit (HCU) to convert pilots from the Whitley and Wellington medium bombers to piloting the four-engined Handley Page Halifax bomber. In January 1942 the unit was split into the 1652 Heavy Conversion Unit and the 1665 Heavy Conversion Unit. 1652 HCU continued in operation at Marston Moor till June 1945, while 1665 HCU moved to RAF Saltby, where it trained crews in the Halifaxes and the Short Stirling. It later moved to RAF Linton-on-Ouse. Following the war the field was used as the home base for No. 268 Maintenance Unit RAF from 1945 to 1949.

Although designated a training base, sometimes the aircraft from No. 1652 HCU had to partake in operations, which occurred during 1942. Three aircraft were lost on operations, though casualty rates were higher on the base due to a large number of accidents during training. Whilst training took place on the base, it was part of No. 4 Group, and it took on the responsibility for the nearby airfields at Acaster Malbis, Riccall and Rufforth. In November 1944, all four bases moved under No. 7 Group (training) and then at the war's end, when the HCU was disbanded in October 1945, Marston Moor became part of Transport Command.

== Notable personnel ==
- Albert Bonass – Bonass, who was a professional footballer before the war, was a wireless operator in a Short Stirling which crashed into the post office in the village of Tockwith in October 1945. Bonass, along with the other crew members (six in all), and one civilian, died.
- Leonard Cheshire – Cheshire had been posted to Marston Moor as a group captain, but he wanted to be back on operations, so took a demotion to wing commander to be the officer commanding No. 617 Squadron
- Margaret Wyndham Gore – in 1943, Gore was the first female pilot to attend Marston Moor for conversion training on the Handley-Page Halifax

== Current use ==
The airfield is now known as Tockwith Airfield. The runways are used for driver's education courses. Some of the buildings about the old airfield were incorporated into a business park. The village of Tockwith has expanded onto the airfield with the eastern side and main section of one runway now dissolved by housing. Some sources indicate civilian aviation use in the late 20th century, and probably beyond.
