= Listed buildings in Flaxby =

Flaxby is a civil parish in the county of North Yorkshire, England. It contains two listed buildings that are recorded in the National Heritage List for England. Of these, one is listed at Grade II*, the middle of the three grades, and the other is at Grade II, the lowest grade. The parish contains the village of Flaxby and the surrounding countryside. Both the listed buildings are outside the village, and consist of a milepost, and a gazebo in a prominent position.

== Key ==
Grade	Criteria
II*	Particularly important buildings of more than special interest
II	Buildings of national importance and special interest

== Buildings ==
Name and location	Photograph	Date	Notes	Grade
Milepost; 54.01718°N 1.38233°W		Early to mid 17th century	The milepost is on the south side of York Road. It is in gritstone and cast iron, and has a triangular plan and a rounded top, and is about 1 metre (3 ft 3 in) high. On the top is inscribed "KNARESBOROUGH AND GREEN HAMMERTON ROAD" and on the sides are the distances to Knaresborough and Green Hammerton.	II
Temple of Victory with railed enclosure 54.02013°N 1.37787°W		1790	A gazebo in a prominent position, in stone, with an eaves cornice, a plain parapet and a lead domed roof. It has an octagonal plan with one storey on a basement. On three sides of the basement are doorways with fanlights and wrought iron balconies. The main entrance is on the southwest side and is approached by two flights of steps with wrought iron railings, and it has a shouldered architrave and a triangular pediment on consoles, all in a round-headed arch. There is a similar arch on the northeast side, two sides between have windows with architraves, and all these sides have balconies. The sides between these contain round-arched recesses and rectangular plaques. Surrounding the building are wrought iron railings on a stone plinth and two gates.	II*
