= Albert Bonass =

English footballer (1911–1945)

Personal information
- Full name: Albert Edward Bonass
- Date of birth: 29 May 1911 (Note: While some sources, including Michael Joyce's Football League Players' Records and Martin Jarred and Dave Windross' Citizens and Minstermen, A Who's Who of York City FC, list Bonass's birthplace as York and his date of birth as 1 January 1912, other, contemporary newspaper sources say he was a native of Acomb, and Stuart Basson's Chesterfield F.C. history site CFChistory.com lists his date of birth as 29 May 1911. His birth was registered in the second quarter of 1911 in the Great Ouseburn registration district of Yorkshire, which included Acomb but not York itself.)
- Place of birth: Acomb, Yorkshire, England
- Date of death: 9 October 1945 (aged 34)
- Place of death: Tockwith, Yorkshire, England
- Height: 5 ft 8 in (1.73 m)
- Position: Outside left

Senior career*
| Years | Team | Apps | (Gls) |
| – | Dringhouses | | |
| – | York Wednesday | | |
| 1932–1933 | Darlington | 6 | (1) |
| 1933–1934 | York City | 6 | (0) |
| 1934–1936 | Hartlepools United | 77 | (31) |
| 1936–1939 | Chesterfield | 97 | (26) |
| 1939–1945 | Queens Park Rangers (Note: Bonass played in all three of Queens Park Rangers' matches in the 1939–40 Football League season abandoned on the outbreak of war. Conventionally, these appearances are not counted as competitive, so are not listed in the infobox.) | 0 | (0) |
| Total | | 186 | (58) |
- * Club domestic league appearances and goals

Albert Edward Bonass (29 May 1911 – 9 October 1945) was an English footballer who scored 58 goals from 186 appearances in the Football League playing as an outside left for Darlington, York City, Hartlepools United and Chesterfield.

Bonass spent the second half of the 1932–33 season as an amateur with Darlington in the Third Division North. He then returned to his home town where he turned professional with York City. He played six league matches for each club. In 1934, he joined another Third Division club, Hartlepools United, where he established himself as the regular selection at outside-left and scored at better than a goal every two games in his first season. Less prolific in his second year, he was sold to Chesterfield, newly promoted to the Second Division for 1936–37. Again, he was first choice on the left wing and productive in front of goal during his first season, less so in the next, in which he helped the team reach the fifth round of the 1937–38 FA Cup. In 1938–39, he fell out of favour, and requested a transfer. He joined Queens Park Rangers, but his career was cut short by the outbreak of war.

During the Second World War, Bonass served in the Metropolitan Police's War Reserve and then as a wireless operator in the Royal Air Force. He was killed in October 1945, together with the rest of the crew and a civilian on the ground, when his Short Stirling bomber crashed on a training flight.

== Early life and career ==
Bonass was born in Acomb, which is now a suburb of York. He was the son of George and Amelia Bonass.

He began his football career with local teams including York Wednesday and York & District League club Dringhouses, and signed for Third Division club Darlington as an amateur in December 1932. According to the Sunderland Echo, he was "speedy and gives promise of developing into a good player". He played six league matches and scored once, in a 1–1 draw with Chester. He was not retained – after a disappointing season, Darlington named only five players on their retained list.

During the 1933 close season, Bonass married Dorothy Parsons in York. He turned professional with York City ahead of the 1933–34 season. Again, he made only six league appearances; in November 1933, he was injured playing for York's reserve team when he crashed into railings surrounding the pitch.

== Hartlepools United ==
After a trial, Bonass signed on a free transfer for Hartlepools United as replacement for winger Ralph Pedwell who had left the club. The 1934–35 Football League campaign began with a visit to Walsall. After two minutes of the match, the home goalkeeper "failed to deal with a centre by [Tommy] Hird, and Bonass dashed in and headed the ball out of his hands into the net". He continued as both regular selection and regular scorer, with 23 goals from 43 matches in all competitions in his first season. His opening goal in the FA Cup first-round replay against Halifax Town created such excitement among the spectators that they broke through the barriers separating terraces from pitch.

In 1935–36, he continued as a fixture at outside-left, but scored fewer goals. one of which came as an equaliser against Lincoln City when the referee failed to notice that teammate Johnny Wigham punched the ball to him rather than playing it legitimately. All the same, three months into the season he was the team's top scorer with six. As in the previous season, Hartlepools played Halifax Town in the FA Cup, and again, they won after a replay; Bonass was involved in three of their four goals, two of which were scored when his shot was parried to another player. He finished the season with 13 goals, second only to Wigham, as Hartlepools finished eighth in the Third Division.

== Chesterfield ==
Bonass signed for Chesterfield, newly promoted to the Second Division, for a £250 fee in May 1936. He went straight into the starting eleven, scored the opening goal in the first home match of the new season, against Norwich City, and the Derby Evening Telegraph's correspondent was impressed: "Bonass, at outside-left, was the pick of the line, for he generally shot accurately, and he showed a good idea of combination." At Christmas he scored the only goal of the game against Aston Villa, and contributed two – one a neat back-heel – to a 4–0 win against Swansea Town on New Year's Day. His goal return for the season was 14 from 39 league games as Chesterfield finished in mid-table, and he was part of the team that beat Derby County to win the Derbyshire Senior Cup.

Chesterfield listed fourteen forwards on their retained list, but Bonass kept his place in the team, partnered at inside-left by new signing Peter Ramage who, the Derby Evening Telegraph wrote, "brought out the best in Bonass and [Harry] Clifton". He was injured against Nottingham Forest in December, thus ending a sequence of 19 consecutive appearances. He had returned to fitness by mid-January, when his team's FA Cup third-round victory reportedly "owed much to ... the dash of Bonass and Clifton in the forwards". They progressed to the fifth round, in which they lost to Tottenham Hotspur only after a replay in front of a 50,000 crowd at White Hart Lane. In the second half of the season, Chesterfield slumped from promotion candidate to mid-table, and after contributing six goals from 39 appearances in the league, Bonass was left out of the last few games, appearing instead for the reserves in the Central League. He was again retained for 1938–39.

Bonass came into the team at outside-right for the fifth game of the new season, before reverting to outside-left against Sheffield Wednesday on 17 September, which coincided with Chesterfield's first win. Two weeks later, he scored the only goal of the game at home to West Ham United direct from a corner kick. He kept his place to the end of the year, but then played only three times before the end of February when he submitted a transfer request. The Derbyshire Times reported no disharmony between club and player, who just felt that different surroundings might help a return to form. He moved on to London club Queens Park Rangers (QPR) in June, and played in all three of their matches before the 1939–40 Football League season was abandoned when war broke out.

== Style of play ==
A profile on Chesterfield F.C. historian Stuart Basson's website describes Bonass as "a sturdy wingman with a keen eye for cutting in and shooting for goal", who was able to produce a "steady supply of goals and good crosses from the left". He was left-footed, and had pace. He had a strong shot, and was a good taker of goalscoring chances, although the Northern Daily Mail's correspondents noted a tendency to miss the easy ones. He rarely scored headed goals. He was also a hard-working and conscientious team player.

== Second World War ==
Bonass completed the 1939–40 season with QPR in the wartime league, which although not regarded as competitive was certainly taken seriously: against Chelsea in December, he was stretchered off with a suspected broken leg, victim of a tough tackle "like many others in this pacy, no-quarter struggle" where the "war of words between rival fan factions on the terrace reminded [the Daily Express's Stanley Halsey] of the Glasgow Rangers–Celtic match". He played some 30 times for QPR thereafter, and guested for a number of clubs including Aldershot, Brentford, Chesterfield, Fulham, Luton Town, Southampton, Watford and York. Bonass served with the Metropolitan Police as a War Reserve Constable for four years, and apart from his war-related duties, played for their football team, scored as the Police Professionals beat the Police Amateurs 5–2 in September 1942, and also represented the national police team.

Bonass went on to join the Royal Air Force, and was promoted to the rank of sergeant. He became a member of the Caterpillar Club after bailing out over Manchester from a Wellington aircraft. In the early hours of 9 October 1945, he was the wireless operator aboard a Short Stirling bomber on a training flight when it stalled and crashed in the main street of the village of Tockwith, North Riding of Yorkshire, which was on the edge of the RAF base at Marston Moor. One civilian and all six crew were killed, a number of houses were demolished, by impact or by fire, and many residents made homeless. Bonass was the father of a daughter, and had been expecting to be demobilised "shortly".

He was buried at the Stonefall Cemetery near Harrogate. On 11 October 2015, a memorial was erected at Tockwith to commemorate the 70th anniversary of the crash.

== Career statistics ==
Appearances and goals by club, season and competition
| Club | Season | League | | | FA Cup | | Div 3N Cup | | Total | |
| Club | Season | Division | Apps | Goals | Apps | Goals | Apps | Goals | Apps | Goals |
|---|---|---|---|---|---|---|---|---|---|---|
| Darlington | 1932–33 | Third Division North | 6 | 1 | 0 | 0 | — | | 6 | 1 |
| York City | 1933–34 | Third Division North | 6 | 0 | 0 | 0 | 0 | 0 | 6 | 0 |
| Hartlepools United | 1934–35 | Third Division North | 38 | 20 | 3 | 2 | 2 | 1 | 43 | 23 |
| Hartlepools United | 1935–36 | Third Division North | 39 | 11 | 6 | 2 | 1 | 0 | 46 | 13 |
| Hartlepools United | Total | | 77 | 31 | 9 | 4 | 3 | 1 | 89 | 36 |
| Chesterfield | 1936–37 | Second Division | 39 | 14 | 1 | 0 | — | | 40 | 14 |
| Chesterfield | 1937–38 | Second Division | 35 | 6 | 5 | 0 | — | | 40 | 6 |
| Chesterfield | 1938–39 | Second Division | 23 | 6 | 0 | 0 | — | | 23 | 6 |
| Chesterfield | Total | | 97 | 26 | 6 | 0 | — | | 103 | 26 |
| Career total | | | 186 | 58 | 15 | 4 | 3 | 1 | 204 | 63 |
