= Cattal =

Village and civil parish in North Yorkshire, England

Coordinates: 53°58′55″N 1°19′01″W

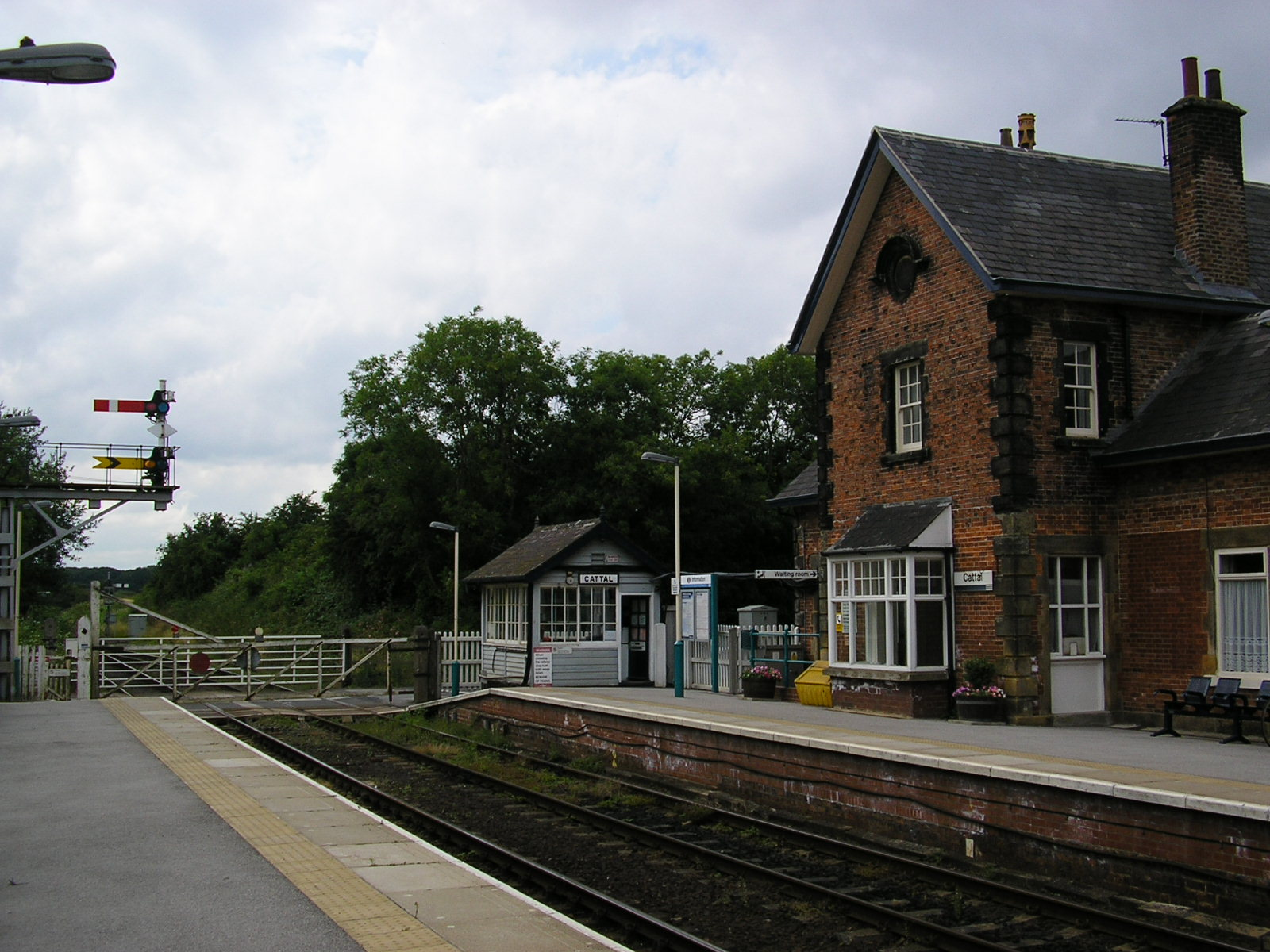
- Cattal railway station

- Location within North Yorkshire
- Population: 115 (2011 census)
- OS grid reference: SE4454
- Civil parish: Cattal
- Unitary authority: North Yorkshire
- Ceremonial county: North Yorkshire
- Region: Yorkshire and the Humber
- Country: England
- Sovereign state: United Kingdom
- Post town: YORK
- Postcode district: YO26
- Police: North Yorkshire
- Fire: North Yorkshire
- Ambulance: Yorkshire
- UK Parliament: Wetherby and Easingwold

Cattal is a village and civil parish in the county of North Yorkshire, England, about 6 miles (9.7 km) east of Knaresborough, and is located 12 miles (19 km) west of the city of York. Cattal is located on the River Nidd. Despite being a small village it is served by Cattal railway station on the Harrogate line (operated by Northern); the railway station generally provides an hourly service to the nearby cities of York and Leeds.

The village has one pub, The Victoria which is located close to the railway station and close to the village. Cattal has good transport links to the nearby cities of York and Leeds as it is located just 1-mile (1.6 km) east of the A1(M) motorway; this road also connects Cattal with much of south-east England including London. It's also just off the A59 which connects north-east England to the north-west, including Liverpool.

Until 1974 it was part of the West Riding of Yorkshire. From 1974 to 2023 it was part of the Borough of Harrogate, it is now administered by the unitary North Yorkshire Council.

== History ==
Cattal is first mentioned in the Domesday Book of 1086, as Catale, Catala. The name probably derives from Old English catt 'wild cat' + halh 'nook of land', referring to land in a bend of the River Nidd associated with wild cats. The total tax assessed was described as quite large with a taxable value of 5 geld units. At this time the head of the manor was Aldborough. There were 2 ploughlands in the village at the time of the Domesday Book, and Osbern of Arques was both Tenant in Chief and Lord in 1086.

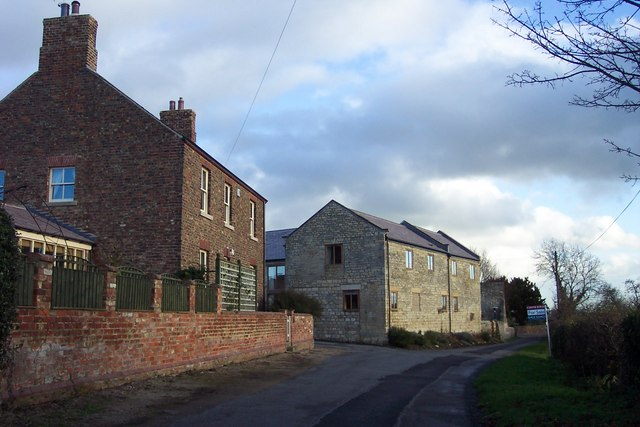
Cattal Parish

In the 1870s Cattal was described as:

"Cattal, a township in Hunsingore parish, W. R. Yorkshire; on the river Nidd, and on the York and High Harrogate railway, 6½ miles ESE of Knaresborough. It has a station on the railway. Acres, 950. Real property, £1,891. Pop., 189. Houses, 40"

Cattal also has a Roman road running through it. It provided a northward link between the road from Castleford to York via Tadcaster and the York to Aldborough road. The road approached the River Nidd from the south through the 'd' of Bridge and on to the 'Ancient Ford'; this line was abandoned when the bridge was built a little upstream of the ford. The present road north from Cattal follows the Roman line, a little west of north to Providence Green and then a little east of north through Whixley, after which it meets the York-Aldborough road. The road known as Rudgate now has a brewery named after it in the nearby town on Tockwith.

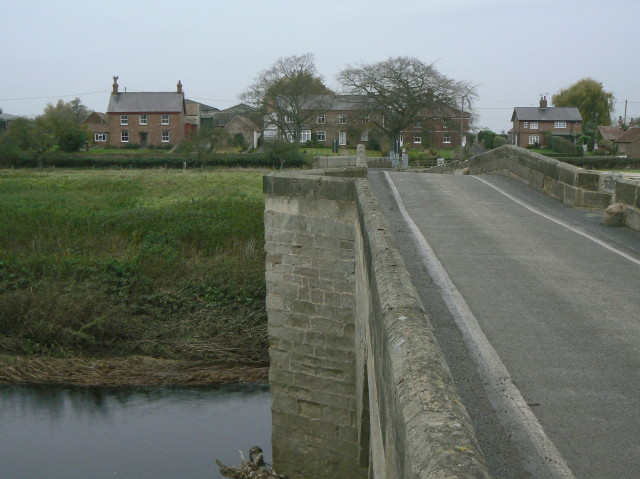
Cattal Bridge

Cattal Bridge is a grade two listed structure which carries Tadcaster road over the River Nidd.

== Population ==
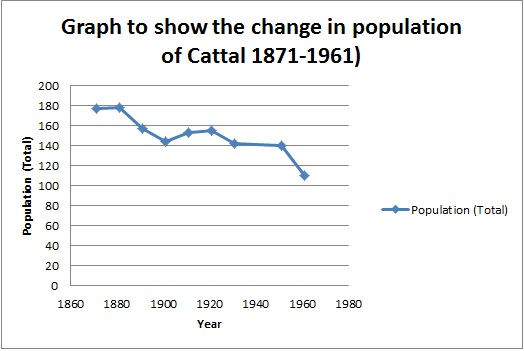
A graph to show the change in population of Cattal

The current population of Cattal according to the 2011 census data is 115; this is a decrease in population from 1881 when the population was at its peak at 178 residents. The population decreased steadily from the early census records from 178 in 1881 to 144 residents at the turn of the century in 1901. The population increased during the next two censuses, it grew to 153 in 1911 and 155 in 1921. However population has decreased every census year since 1921 until 1961 with a large dip coming between 1951 and 1961 from 140 to 110 residents.

== Age structure ==
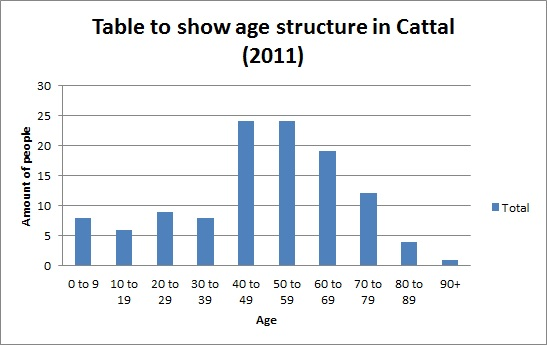
Chart to show age structure of Cattal in 2

Cattal has an ageing population, with the 73% of the residents of the village being aged 40 or over and having very few young dependants living in the village. With very few amenities in the village this age structure will remain as there are no pull factors for the young population to move to the village.

== Centre of Yorkshire ==
In recent times an argument has arisen between villages in Yorkshire over who should rightfully hold the title of the geographical centre of Yorkshire. Although most recently in 2012 the prestigious title had been given to the village of Hessay five miles from Cattal, controversy still remains as to where the centre is. The Ordnance Survey used its own detailed records of the county's boundary and the help of a computer program and a field in Hessay was pinpointed as the centre point of Yorkshire. However a similar computer program used four years prior to this selected Cattal as the geographical centre. To make things complicated further a third village Barkston Ash also claims the honour of being the middle point in Yorkshire as they claim the ash tree in the village is the midpoint.

The mystery remains but The Victoria pub in Cattal use the idea that Cattal is the centre of Yorkshire to claim that they are the most central pub in Yorkshire.

== Flooding ==
Due to the village's proximity to the River Nidd it has a recent history of flooding during extreme weather. Flooding has occurred in the village most recently in 2012 with houses located near the banks of the river put on alert by the environmental agency. During the flooding in 2012 one man had to be rescued from his car near to the Cattal Bridge after the flood waters reached 4 feet (1.2 m) in depth. Also during the floods two donkeys were rescued from a field in Cattal after becoming stranded after the river burst its banks. A specialist team travelled across the North of England for the rescue.

== New village ==
In early 2019, Oakgate Homes submitted an application to Harrogate Borough Council to build a new village just north of Cattal clustered around Cattal railway station. The 4,000 home village would include two primary schools and a doctor's surgery and would be entitled Maltkiln village. Work would also be undertaken on the adjacent A59 to remove crossroads in favour of roundabouts.

== See also ==
- Listed buildings in Cattal
