= Escrick =

Village and civil parish in North Yorkshire, England

Coordinates: 53°52′46″N 1°02′33″W

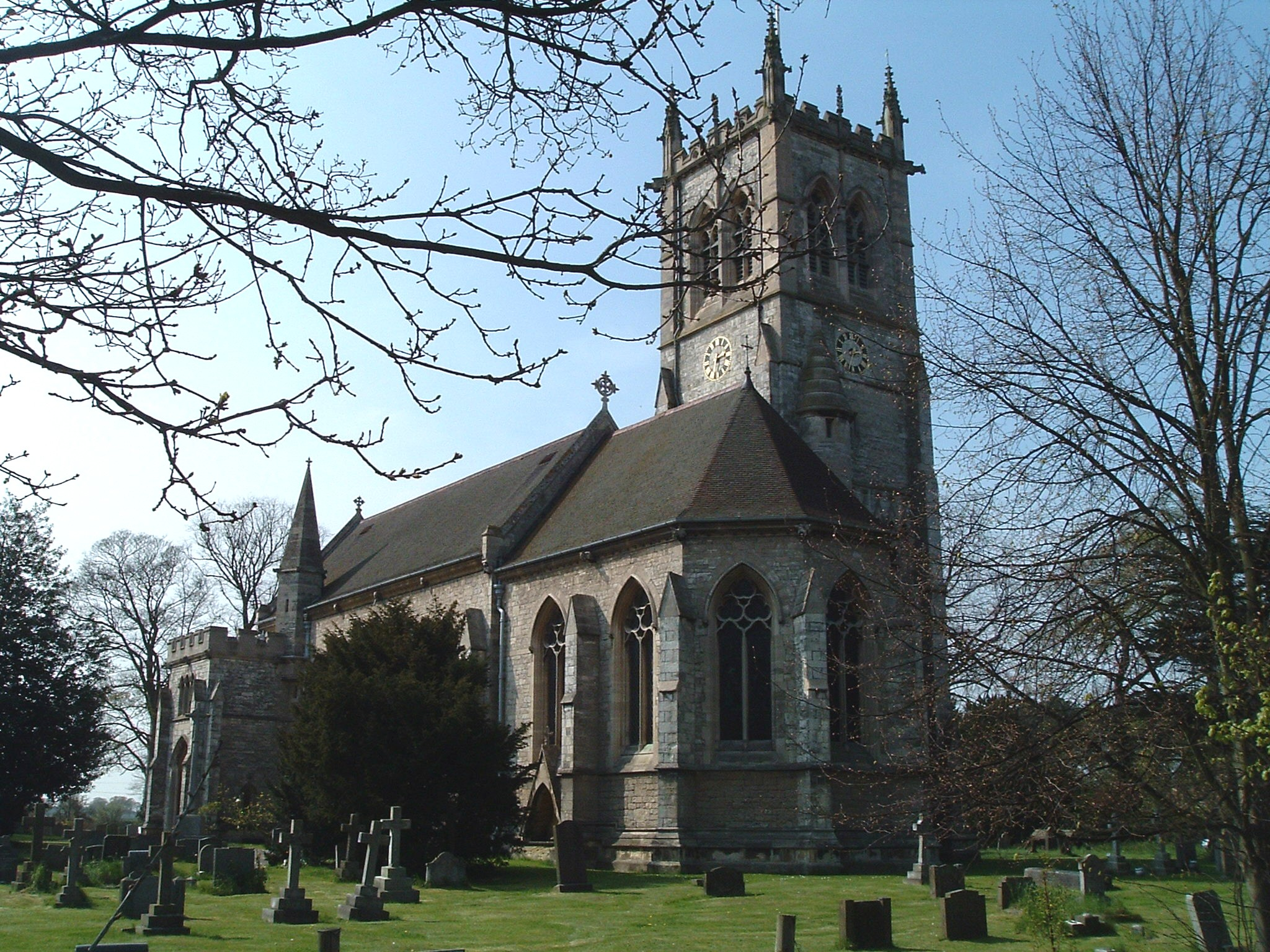
- St Helen's church, Escrick

- Location within North Yorkshire
- Population: 1,078 (2011 census)
- OS grid reference: SE632429
- Unitary authority: North Yorkshire
- Ceremonial county: North Yorkshire
- Region: Yorkshire and the Humber
- Country: England
- Sovereign state: United Kingdom
- Post town: YORK
- Postcode district: YO19
- Dialling code: 01904
- Police: North Yorkshire
- Fire: North Yorkshire
- Ambulance: Yorkshire
- UK Parliament: Selby

Escrick is a village and civil parish in North Yorkshire, England. It was in the historic East Riding of Yorkshire, but since 1974 has come under North Yorkshire. It is approximately equidistant between Selby and York on what is now the A19 road.

== History and geography ==
Escrick sits at the southernmost limit of glaciation during the last ice age. When the ice retreated, a deposit known as a "terminal moraine" was left behind, in the form of a ridge. The name "Escrick" may mean "ash ridge", suggesting that the village was first established in an area of Ash.

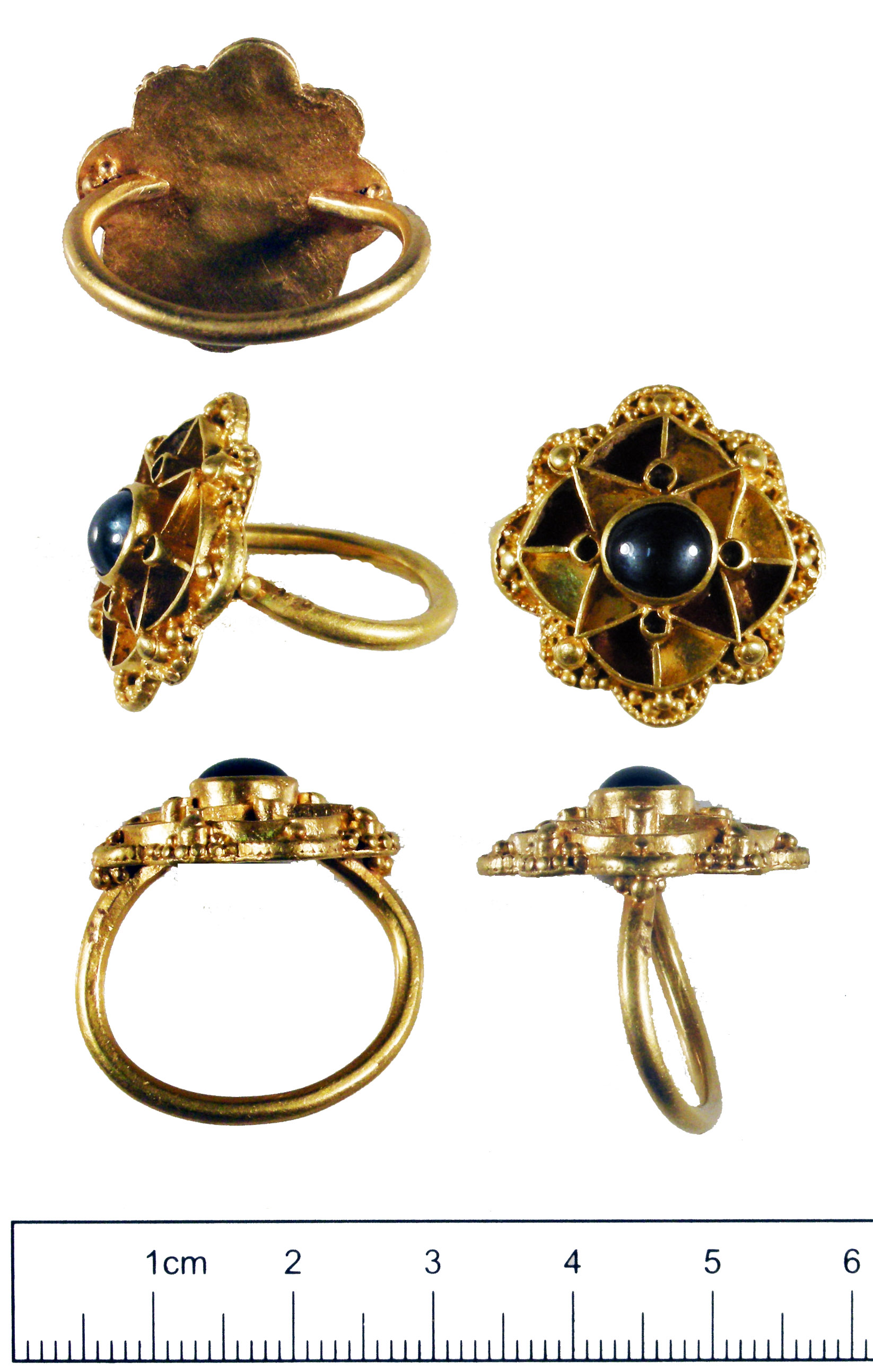
The Escrick Ring

A gold Anglo-Saxon ring (the so-called "Escrick ring") was discovered in a field near Escrick by a metal detectorist in 2009 and was acquired by the Yorkshire Museum for £35,000.

During the medieval period, the village was known as "Ascri" (Ash Ridge), but by 1600 the name Escrick was in use. Escrick was developed as an estate village by Sir Henry Thompson who acquired the village and the hall in 1668. Sir Henry's great grandson, Beilby Thompson, inherited the estate in 1742. Under his ownership the village extended towards York and the church was relocated from beside the hall to its present site on the York Road (A19). Part of this re-organisation involved stopping the main village street at the gates to the hall and creating a by-pass which has become the present day A19. The village's sylvan character also evolved from the time of enclosure when the open land became parkland.

It was historically in the East Riding of Yorkshire, but from 1974 to 2023 was in the Selby District of the shire county of North Yorkshire. In 2023 the district was abolished and North Yorkshire became a unitary authority.

The proposed development of the 4,000 house new town Heronby within 660 yards (600 m) of the village was rejected in early 2024. It had received many objections from the local populace, the City of York Council, and wildlife groups, nonetheless, it is predicted to be resubmitted.

== Landmarks ==
=== Escrick Hall ===
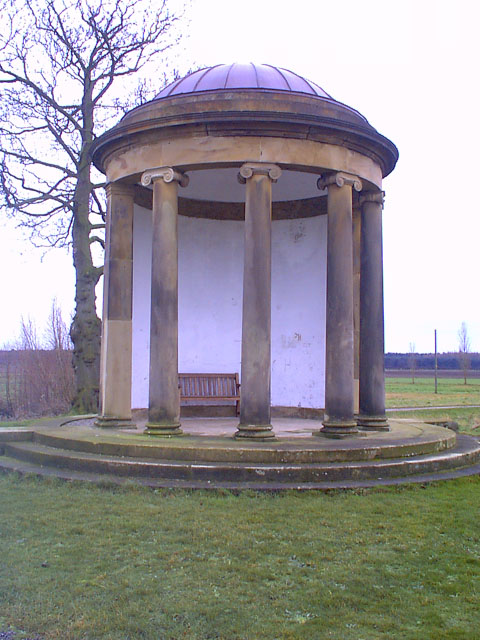
Monument in Escrick Park

A manor-house at Escrick existed in 1323, and in 1557 was called Escrick Hall and was a substantial house of seventeen hearths in the 1670s. The seat of the Lord of the manor, it was rebuilt in grand style about 1690 with a park of over 450 acres (180 ha), and would be much extended and improved in the eighteenth and nineteenth centuries. Its owners included Sir Thomas Knyvet, one of the Royalists who foiled the 1605 Gunpowder Plot; and Lord Wenlock, the 19th century MP.

The house was rebuilt by Henry Thompson (died 1700) c. 1680–90. The house was now two storeys high with basement and attics, and the main front was seven bays long with a central entrance. The building was later re-fronted and raised to three storeys c. 1758. In 1763 John Carr of York was employed to design additions to the building adding a range which abuts the north front and extending beyond it to both east and west. A square stable block with four ranges around a central court on the north-east was added. Carr also remodelled the interior of the old house. The mid nineteenth century was another period of substantial building activity at Escrick. A north-west wing was added in 1846–8, and a north-eastern link to the stables was complete by 1850. Many internal alterations were carried out during the nineteenth century including the addition of a pump house, laundry, and dairies. The conversion of the house for school use has resulted in some new building, notably a new laboratory block on the north-west, but much of the dormitory and classroom accommodation has been contrived within the old stables and secondary rooms, thankfully leaving the principal rooms intact. The Hall and Escrick estates passed to the present owners, the Forbes Adam family, on the death of Beilby Lawley in 1920. The Hall has been occupied by Queen Margaret's School since 1949 and the park is now operated as a holiday and pleasure park.

Escrick Park is an extensive landscape park with pleasure grounds associated with c. 1680 Escrick Hall. Features include: Ionic Temple, 'Menagerie' farm, pond, topiary, woodland walks, and extensive woodland rides which includes a well built cross country horse riding circuit leading through the former 450-acre (180 ha) deer park in front of the original family house.

=== Parsonage Hotel ===
The building that today houses the three-star Parsonage Hotel and Spa dates back to the early 1840s. It retains many of its original features.

=== St Helen's Church ===
The church of St Helen has stood in its present position since 1783 when Beilby Thompson, then Lord of the manor, replaced the 13th century church that was once situated to the west of Escrick Hall. The present building, designed in Victorian Gothic style by architect Francis Penrose, was built at the expense of Beilby Lawley in 1857.

== Gallery ==
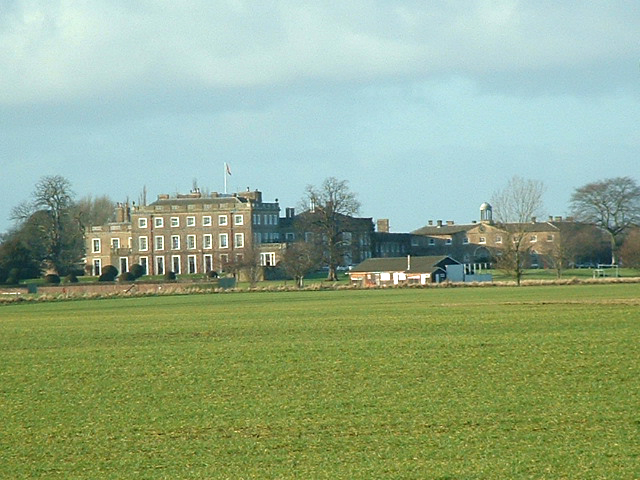
Queen Margarets Girls School

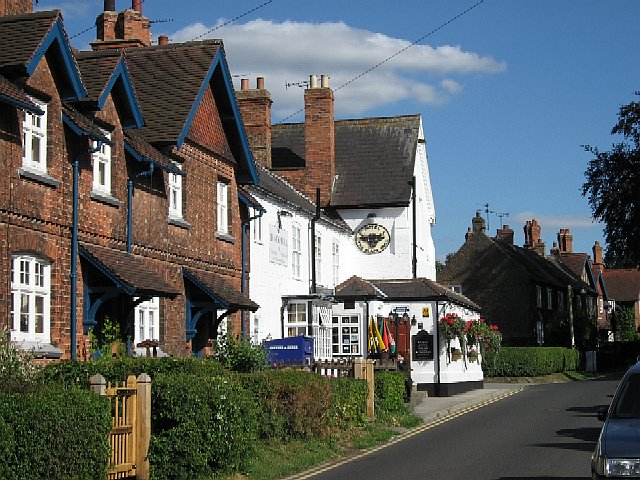
The Black Bull public house

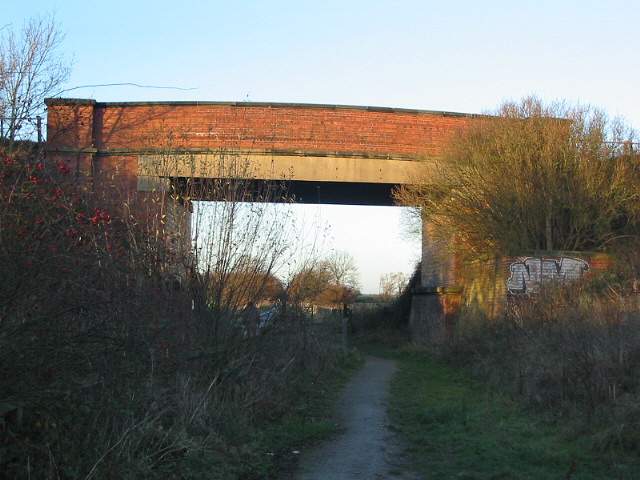
Cyclepath under the road bridge
