= Tockwith =

Village and civil parish in North Yorkshire, England

Coordinates: 53°57′54″N 1°17′23″W

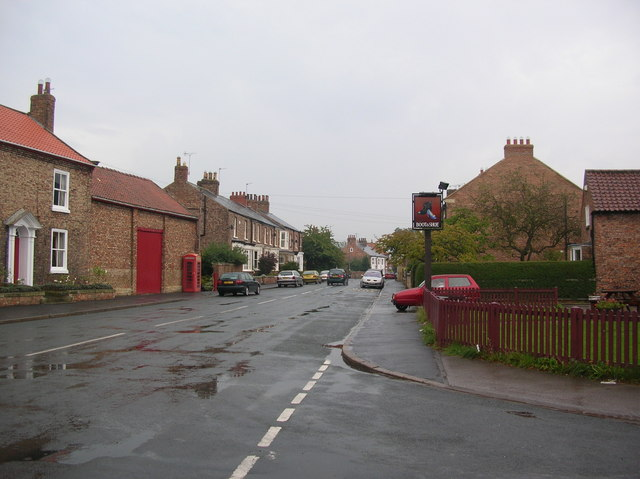
- Tockwith, the Boot and Shoe on the right

- Location within North Yorkshire
- Population: 1,597 (2011)
- OS grid reference: SE468523
- Unitary authority: North Yorkshire
- Ceremonial county: North Yorkshire
- Region: Yorkshire and the Humber
- Country: England
- Sovereign state: United Kingdom
- Post town: YORK
- Postcode district: YO26
- Dialling code: 01423
- Police: North Yorkshire
- Fire: North Yorkshire
- Ambulance: Yorkshire
- UK Parliament: Wetherby and Easingwold

Tockwith is a village and civil parish in the county of North Yorkshire, England, near the town of Wetherby and the city of York. There has been a village on the site since at least 1086 when Tocvi was mentioned in the Domesday Book. Tockwith's greatest claim to fame is being used as a staging post by Oliver Cromwell prior to the Battle of Marston Moor in 1644. He made reference to Tockwith in his diaries, in which he said: "If heaven should be half as blessed as the fields of Tockwith, all those who should pass St. Peter's Gate shall be met with joys unequalled".

Until 1974 it was part of the West Riding of Yorkshire. From 1974 to 2023 it was part of the Borough of Harrogate, it is now administered by the unitary North Yorkshire Council.

== Conservation area ==
On 20 January 1994, Tockwith was designated a conservation area.

== Etymology ==
The name Tockwith may derive from the Old English name Toc(c), and wic, which is most commonly interpreted as 'dairy farm'. The word wic was later exchanged for the Scandinavian word við(r) meaning 'wood'. The name of the village is recorded in a number of forms:

Tocvi in the Domesday Book of 1086

Tockwic and Tockwith in 1121-27

Tocwic in the early Yorkshire Charters of 1428 and 1430

Tocwyz in the 1249 Charter Rolls and

Tockewyht in the 1280 Charter Rolls

Tockheight in the 1460 Census

Tockwith in the 1723 Census

Tockwith in the 2011 Census

== Historical information ==
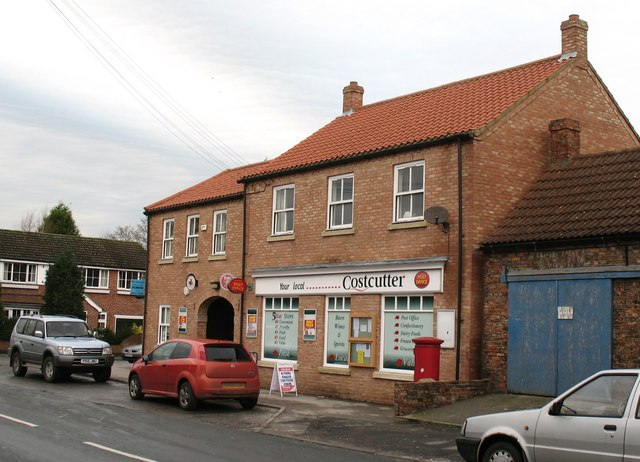
Village shop and Post Office

Tockwith played a major part in the English Civil War during the 17th century when the village was occupied by the Parliamentarian army commanded by Thomas Fairfax. In 1644, the Battle of Marston Moor occurred on the land between Tockwith and Long Marston. A stone monument on the road between the two villages commemorates the site. Cromwell mentioned the village favourably in his diaries; "If heaven should be half as blessed as the fields of Tockwith, all those who should pass St. Peter's Gate shall be met with joys unequalled".

RAF Tockwith was opened on the western edge of the village in November 1941. Most Royal Air Force bases are named after the parish in which their headquarters are located in, but to prevent confusion with RAF Topcliffe near Thirsk, the base was named RAF Marston Moor.

=== Stirling air crash ===
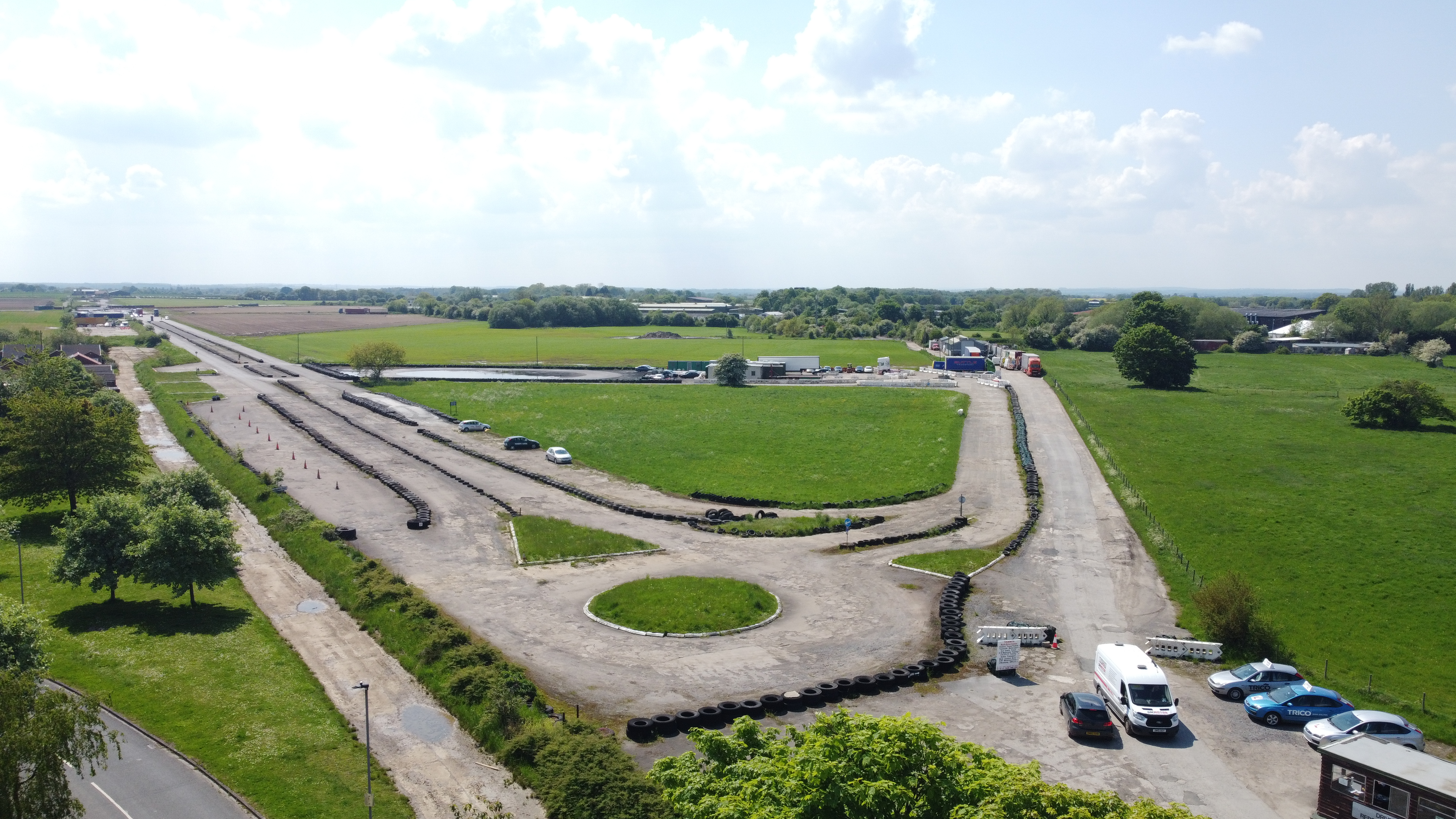
The former RAF Marston Moor

At 1.34am on Tuesday 9 October 1945, a Stirling bomber which was about to land on RAF Marston Moor crashed in the main street of Tockwith, killing the village postmaster and the six crew members as well as destroying nineteen houses. Amongst the crew members killed was former York City footballer Albert Bonass.

On 11 October 2015, a memorial was erected at Tockwith to commemorate the 70th anniversary of the crash.

== Tockwith church ==
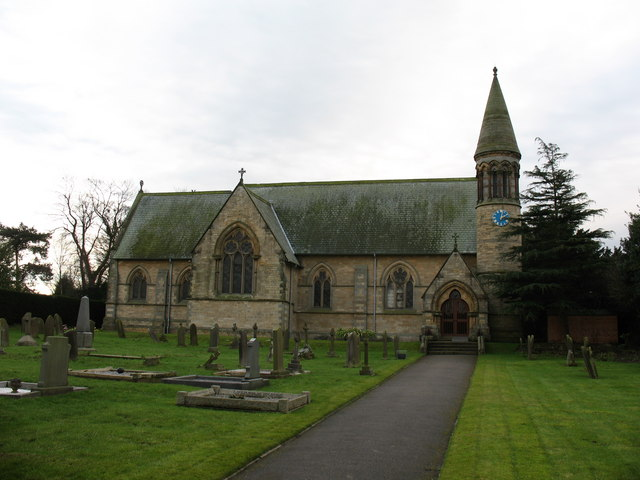
Church of the Epiphany

The Tockwith Church of the Epiphany was consecrated in 1866, and was designed by Mallinson and Healey. The grade II listed building is a large aisleless cruciform church in the Geometrical style with a cylindrical bell turret.

== Village layout ==
Tockwith is situated 8 miles (13 km) west of York and 4 miles (7 km) north-east of Wetherby. The village is approached through relatively flat farmlands from the west along Fleet Lane, with the church clearly visible. The village has grown significantly since the war, with several large developments on its boundaries. There are two public houses in the heart of the village, the Boot and Shoe and the Spotted Ox.

== Sports facilities ==
Tockwith has one of the finest 'grass roots' level football pitches in the country; it has appeared in several magazines and local groundsman Joe Wilson was awarded "Highly Commended" in the FA Groundsman of the Year Awards for Steps 7 and below for the 2006 season, awarded 1st place in 2007 and 2nd place in 2008. There is also a second football pitch, which the junior teams use. There is a large training area and a pavilion. Tockwith AFC fields a 1st and 2nd team every Saturday who play in the York Minster League.

There is also a bowls green (made of grass) and tennis courts (made of concrete) at the same location, which require membership.

== See also ==
- Listed buildings in Tockwith
