= Levisham railway station =

Railway station in North Yorkshire, England

Levisham
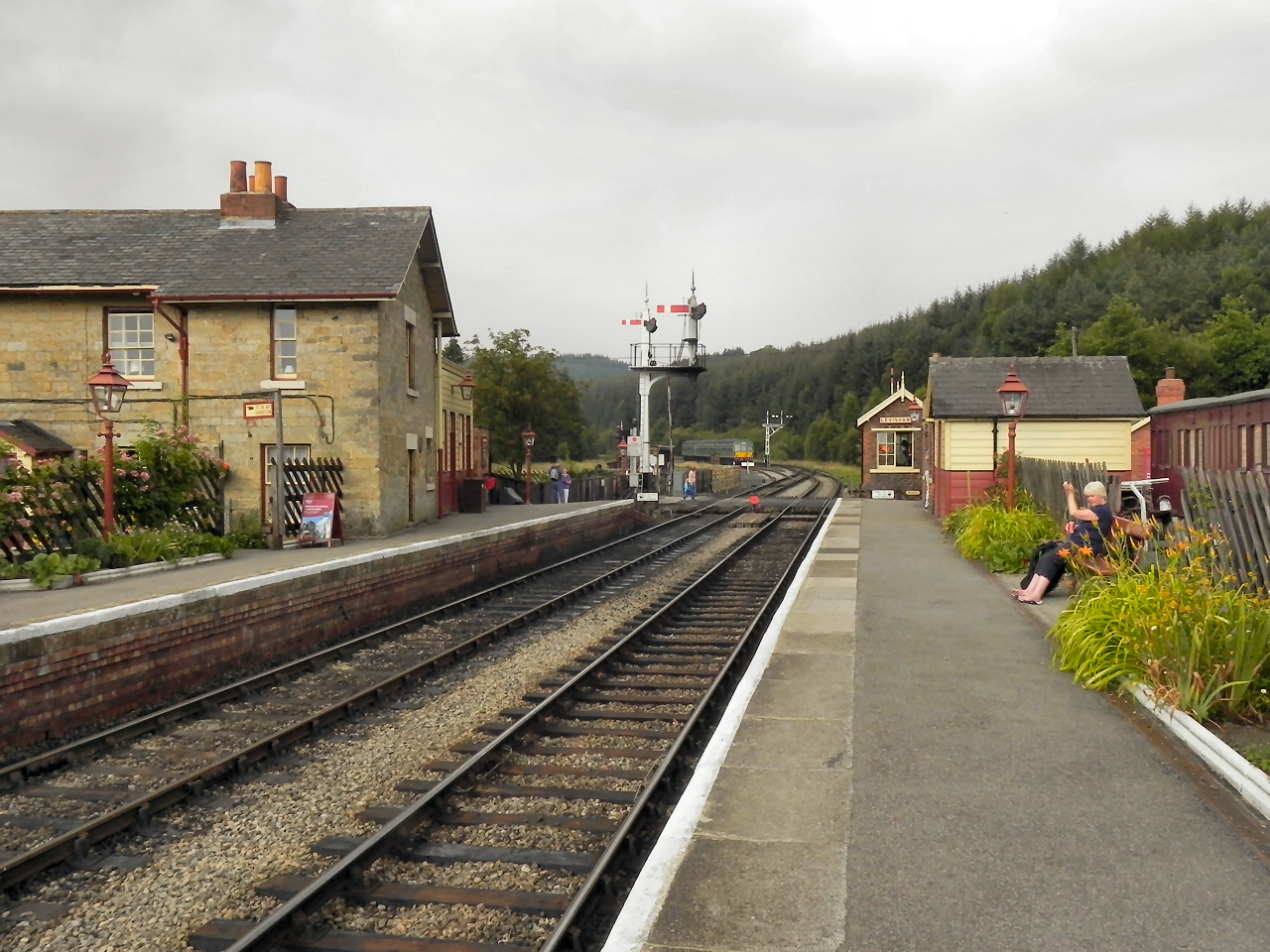

General information
- Location: Levisham, North Yorkshire; England
- Coordinates: 54.308171°N 0.744290°W
- Grid reference: SE817909
- System: Station on heritage railway
- Manager: North Yorkshire Moors Railway
- Platforms: 2
Location

Levisham railway station is a station on the North Yorkshire Moors Railway and serves the village of Levisham in the North York Moors National Park, North Yorkshire, England.

The station house is a grade II listed building.

== History ==
=== Origins (1836–1845) ===
The railway serving Levisham Station was originally opened by the Whitby and Pickering Railway in 1836. The W&P was an isolated horse worked railway engineered by George Stephenson, it did not have stations as we would understand them today, instead tending to follow stage coach practice. An engraving by George Dodgson entitled 'Hailing the Coach', which appeared in the 1836 guide to the W&P written by Henry Belcher, depicts a passenger hailing a coach on the W&P at Raindale just over a mile north of Levisham Station.

=== Y&NM (1845–1854) ===
The W&P was taken over by the York and North Midland Railway in 1845 who converted it to a double track steam worked conventional railway and linked it to their new line from York to Scarborough. The Y&NM built the station at Levisham on land provided by the Rector (and Lord of the Manor) of Levisham, the Rev. Robert Skelton. One of Skelton's rectories (he built three) 'Grove House' stands adjacent to the station. It is thought that Skelton influenced the location of the station, which is closer to Newton-on-Rawcliffe than Levisham, although the only access to Newton was via a steep path. The logical place to build the station would have been nearly two miles further south at Farworth, where it would have served both Levisham and Lockton.

The Y&NM adapted a farmhouse adjacent to the railway to provide a house for the 'station clerk' who was in charge of the station. The building, now Grade II listed, stands today encroaching onto the down (western) platform and still displays many characteristics of the Y&NM's architect George Townsend Andrews. The original platforms would have been provided at this time, short and low and almost certainly re-using ex W&P stone sleeper blocks as an edging. These blocks are still there today. They are under later brickwork on the up platform, but when the down platform was raised the sleeper blocks were used again as the edging. Examples of these stone blocks, along with a length of the 'fish belly' rail they supported, can also be found outside the Station's Exhibition van.

The first steam train service started between Pickering and Levisham (only) on 1 September 1846 using a single track. By the following year a second track had been laid and was passed for use by Her Majesties Railway Inspector Captain R. E. Coddington in a report dated 8 June 1847 following an inspection three days earlier. The same report did not approve opening the line between Levisham and the 'top of the incline' (at Goathland) as 'over this portion the rails were ill adjusted, the sleepers irregular, the ballasting incomplete & some pairs of Contractors joints & shifting Rails remaining'. Approval was however given for opening the line from the bottom of the Incline to Whitby but allowed the use of only a single engine. A further report dated 30 June 1847 following a second inspection on the previous day, found a much improved state of affairs, one track was complete and the second within a day of completion. Captain Coddington summed up that 'I am of opinion that the line may be opened with safety on the 1st Inst according to the wish of the Company'. It is clear from Capt. Coddington's reports that the horse-drawn coaches continued to run until replaced by steam trains.

=== NER (1854–1923) ===
The Y&NM became part of the North Eastern Railway in 1854.

In 1858 the NER built six pairs of platelayers cottages along the Whitby branch to the design of their architect Thomas Prosser. The pair still standing adjacent to the level crossing are the only survivors of the southernmost three pairs of cottages built for £99 each by Henry Creaser of York.

The year 1865 saw no change at Levisham as such but it did see the opening of the Goathland Deviation line to avoid the Beckhole Incline. Thus the next station to the north changed from Goathland Bank Top on the original W&P route to Goathland Mill, soon shortened to just Goathland on the new deviation line.

Little changed at Levisham for nearly twenty years until 1876, a busy year for the Station, when the installation of block signalling on the Whitby branch brought the signal box that stands today. At the start of the year the NER Traffic Committee recommended that 'additional accommodation should be provided at Levisham Station' and the Locomotive Committee approved the estimated sum of £90 be spent to provide 'new Waiting Rooms etc.' The NER Architects Book of Contracts reveals that construction work only took from 31 January until 31 March using their own workmen and two contractors. The result was the wooden building attached to the station house on the down platform, which was originally equally divided into a 'General Room' and a 'Ladies Room'. The adjacent brick built Gentlemen's toilet was built at the same time. The final price after contingencies were added in came to £227-4s–3d.
From evidence found during the renovation of this building it was built at a time when the platform was much lower than today but in the expectation of it being raised – two stone steps to each doorway were found beneath the modern platform surface.

In 1880 came the turn of the up platform, in the form of a brick waiting shed built at a cost of £40. Shortly afterwards a wooden warehouse, described as ‘a small Lock-up Shed for the storage of goods at an estimated average cost of about £25’ was built immediately south of the waiting shed.

During the First World War many secondary double track lines in the UK suffered partial singling, so that the recovered track could be sent to France in support of the war effort. The Whitby branch did not escape and from New Year 1917 the line from Levisham station southwards to Newbridge signal box (a mile north of Pickering station) became single track. It is far from certain that the track actually reached France, discounting the story that the ship carrying the track was sunk in the channel – a story that seems to be attached to many of the singled stretches of track; the government guaranteed the railway companies that they would be compensated for the track taken after the war but in the case of this particular stretch they seem to have had reservations about paying up. The reinstatement of the second track was planned for many years but finally in 1926 the plan was dropped and the temporary arrangements of 1917 remained in place for nearly fifty years, until the line closed in 1965.

=== LNER (1923–1948) ===
With the grouping of the railways following the First World War, in 1923 the North Eastern Railway became part of the London and North Eastern Railway.

In the straitened circumstances of the 1920s the LNER tried to save money. The post of station master at Levisham was combined with that at Goathland and in 1926 a new brick built booking office was built adjacent to the signal box (replacing facilities in the station house) allowing the signalman to double as booking clerk.

=== BR (1948–1965) ===
Levisham Station remained substantially unchanged through the change to British Railways in 1948. In the Beeching Report of 1963 planned the closure of all railways serving Whitby. Despite a fierce local campaign of opposition the passenger service between Rillington Junction and Grosmont closed on 8 March 1965.

=== Closure and Rebirth (1965–1973) ===
Following closure BR removed the single siding and the headshunt along the old up line formation. The signals were recovered or scrapped, as was the lever frame in the signal box. The point rodding, still NER / LNER standard round steel tube coated with tar was simply cut up into short lengths and left where it fell. This presumably helped to support BR's claim that the cost of reinstating the signalling made re-opening the line too uneconomic.

The buildings were simply left, with the two 1858 cottages that remained let to BR staff as holiday cottages. The station house and the adjacent wooden waiting rooms were eventually let to a school as a 'study centre'. Of the other buildings, the wooden lamp house somehow got burned down but the rest more or less survived, windows got broken and eventually the frames too but the shells remained to be inherited by the North Yorkshire Moors Railway (NYMR).

Although the NYMR Preservation Society was formed in 1967 little thought was given to Levisham Station for some time, they were more concerned with securing the trackbed and (initially) only track from Grosmont through Goathland to Ellerbeck (about 6 miles) – Levisham lay a further six miles to the south. It was only when the County Council and the National Park realised that a tourist railway ending in the middle of nowhere would be far less of an asset than one going all the way to Pickering, and so arranged a rental-purchase arrangement with the NYMR to finance the additional twelve miles of track, that Levisham Station once again had a real future.

A small group of young volunteers detached themselves from Goathland and moved into Levisham station. At first the only usable building was the signal box (habitable would be too strong a term), with temporary window frames covered in polythene and the fireplace resuscitated, it made a rough and ready base. The more hardy stayed overnight in sleeping bags on the wooden floor with one brave soul suspending a hammock from the roof beams. This group started work tidying up the station and evicting the rats, but more important was fencing, ditching and keying-up on 'their' section of track northwards to Newtondale.

After some time access to the school study centre based in the station house was negotiated (when it was not in use); this provided relative luxury – bunk beds (in the old waiting room) and proper washing and cooking facilities (an old Rayburn stove).

With the approach of re-opening in 1973 the resources of the Levisham gang were needed to get the northern end of the line ready for opening, in particular creating a loop at Goathland, so Levisham Station once more went onto the 'back-burner'.

=== NYMR (1973 – today) ===
With the reopening of the NYMR as an 18-mile-long (29 km) railway in 1973, the Levisham gang returned to base and started the long, slow task of restoration and refurbishment that has made the station what it is today.

The train station with a NYMR train and visitors

The Levisham station that reopened in 1973 was a long way from what can be seen today, only one platform was in use (the shorter up platform), there was no signalling, no sidings, the line serving the down platform had no connection at its northern end. The 'level crossing' certainly was not level, still being made of recovered sleepers, gradually deteriorating under the additional traffic from the recently opened 'Newtondale Forest Drive' (the crossing originally only served the railway cottages, adjacent fields and a footpath to Newton-on-Rawcliffe). The crossing gates were ordinary field gates. None of the down platform buildings were in use, the waiting rooms (including the ladies toilet) were still let to a Scarborough school. The Gents was only (just) fit for staff use. On the Up platform the signal box was still a shell and the wooden floor in the booking office had collapsed. The original awning over the booking window had been demolished as unsafe, but measurements of the surviving components were taken and a sketch drawing produced. The brick waiting shed had lost its window frames and the massive beam supporting the brickwork over the entrance was suffering from terminal rot. A start had been made on recovering the platform gardens but they still suffered the depredations of the moorland sheep who had not yet learnt that the railway was back in business and not just additional grazing. But for all of that Levisham Station was open again and the serious work of renovation and restoration was under way.

Over the winter of 2007–8 the station group, aided by contractors and NYMR staff have constructed a new period brick weighbridge house alongside the entrance to the station yard / car park, complete with a weigh table set in the roadway. Unfortunately, although capable of operating, the weighbridge will not be working since all space within the new building is required for its real role as a catering outlet.

During the summer of 2023 an investigation was carried out into the conduct of some volunteers within the station group at Levisham. Following the investigation a number of volunteers were suspended from the railway for a period of two years.

== Services ==
The North Yorkshire Moors Railway runs regular services between Pickering and Grosmont stations, with some trains continuing to Whitby, operated by a variety of steam and diesel traction.

Preceding station	Heritage railways	Following station
Pickering Terminus	North Yorkshire Moors Railway	Newton Dale Halt towards Whitby
Disused railways
Pickering	Whitby and Pickering Railway	Goathland (Bank Top)

== People ==
There is no central record of railway staff, the following list has been compiled as part of a project being run by the NYMR Archives to try to record the railway staff for the whole Whitby branch. As such this information has been accumulated from various, disparate sources and is far from complete.

=== Station Masters ===
==== Y&NM ====
- J. Wilson, Appt (?), 'Station Clerk' in 1848, in April 1853

==== NER ====
- John Watson, Appt: 21 December 1855 (ex-Goods Porter Pickering). Previous SM had resigned. SM also acted as Postmaster from May 1857. Moved to Croft, 24 April 1863.
- Ino. Watson, Appt: 24 April 1863 (ex-Marishes Road) Moved to Marton, 24 May 1867
- William Breckon, Appt: 24 May 1867 (ex- platelayer, Whitby branch). Station Master and Goods Agent (in 1890)
- Mr. Rymer

==== LNER ====
- F.Gillery, Appt: 20 December 1923 (ex-Relief Clerk (R.S.M.), York)

Moved to Pilmoor & Raskelf, 13 October 1933 by when he was SM Goathland and Levisham.

Henceforth until closure the Goathland SM covered Levisham.

==== NYMR ====
- Graham Reussner, Appt. Summer 1974; stepped down due to poor health c 1995.
- Simon Barraclough, Appt c 1996; role removed 2023.

=== Other staff ===
==== Signalmen ====
- W. Hartley, (in 1931)(May really be Artley ?)
- Walter Artley, (in 1930s, photos in NYMHRT Archives)
- Jack Eddon, (in 1930s, photos in NYMHRT Archives)
- Mr. Woodmansey
- Mr. Fletcher

==== Track Workers ====
- David Morley, repairer (in 1862)
- George Keeth, repairer (in 1862), Platelayer (in 1875)
- J. Boyes, platelayer (in 1875)
- Mr. Pickering, P.W. Ganger (Levisham section, pre First World War)

== See also ==
- Listed buildings in Levisham
