= Goathland railway station =

Railway station in North Yorkshire, England

Goathland
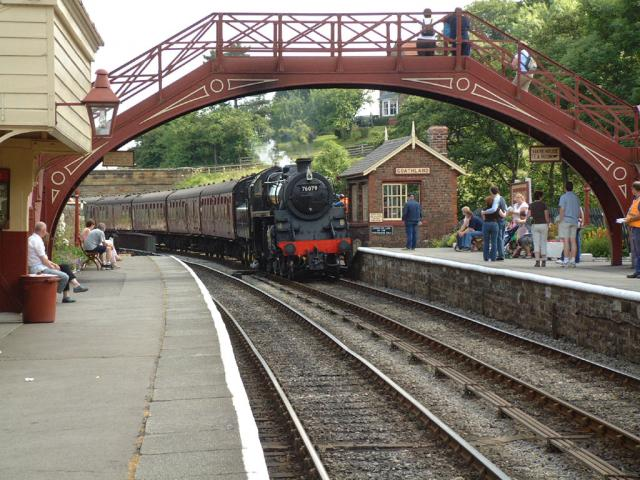

General information
- Location: Goathland, North Yorkshire; England
- Coordinates: 54.400°N 0.712°W
- Grid reference: NZ837013
- System: Station on heritage railway
- Manager: North Yorkshire Moors Railway
- Platforms: 2

Key dates
- 1865: Station opened as Goathland Mill
- 1965: Station closed
- 1973: Station reopened
Location

Goathland railway station

Goathland railway station is a station on the North Yorkshire Moors Railway and serves the village of Goathland in the North York Moors National Park, North Yorkshire, England. It has also been used in numerous television and film productions. Holiday accommodation is available in the form of a camping coach.

== History ==
This station is on the deviation line opened by the North Eastern Railway in 1865 to avoid the cable-worked Beckhole Incline, which was part of the original 1836 Whitby and Pickering Railway route. It was opened as Goathland Mill, and was so named due to its proximity to the watermill on the Murk Esk river adjacent to the station.

The original Goathland station was located at the head of the incline, where there are still some Y&NM cottages, together with a single W&P one.

The station buildings were to the design of the NER's architect Thomas Prosser and were very similar to those being built concurrently (by the same contractor, Thomas Nelson) on the Castleton to Grosmont section of the Esk Valley Line at Danby, Lealholm, Glaisdale and Egton. The collection of buildings is very little altered since they were built – the last recorded change (apart from NYMR restoration) was in 1908. A tributary of the River Esk flows close by the station.

Deemed to be uneconomic, the line through the station was closed to passenger traffic in 1965 as part of the Beeching cuts, before reopening in 1973 as part of the North Yorkshire Moors Railway.

Hornby modelled Goathland as part of the Skaledale Junction series, which included the footbridge, waiting room and Hogwarts Express.

== Film and television appearances ==
The station and its environment have appeared in various productions including:

- Heartbeat (as Aidensfield station)
- The Harry Potter films as the Hogwarts Express station at Hogsmeade
- All Creatures Great and Small
- The Simply Red video of "Holding Back the Years" from 1985.
- Keeping Mum starring Rowan Atkinson
- Carrington starring Emma Thompson and Jonathan Pryce

== See also ==
- Listed buildings in Goathland

Preceding station	Heritage railways	Following station
Newton Dale Halt towards Pickering	North Yorkshire Moors Railway	Grosmont towards Whitby
