= Beckhole railway station =

Disused railway station in North Yorkshire, England

Beckhole
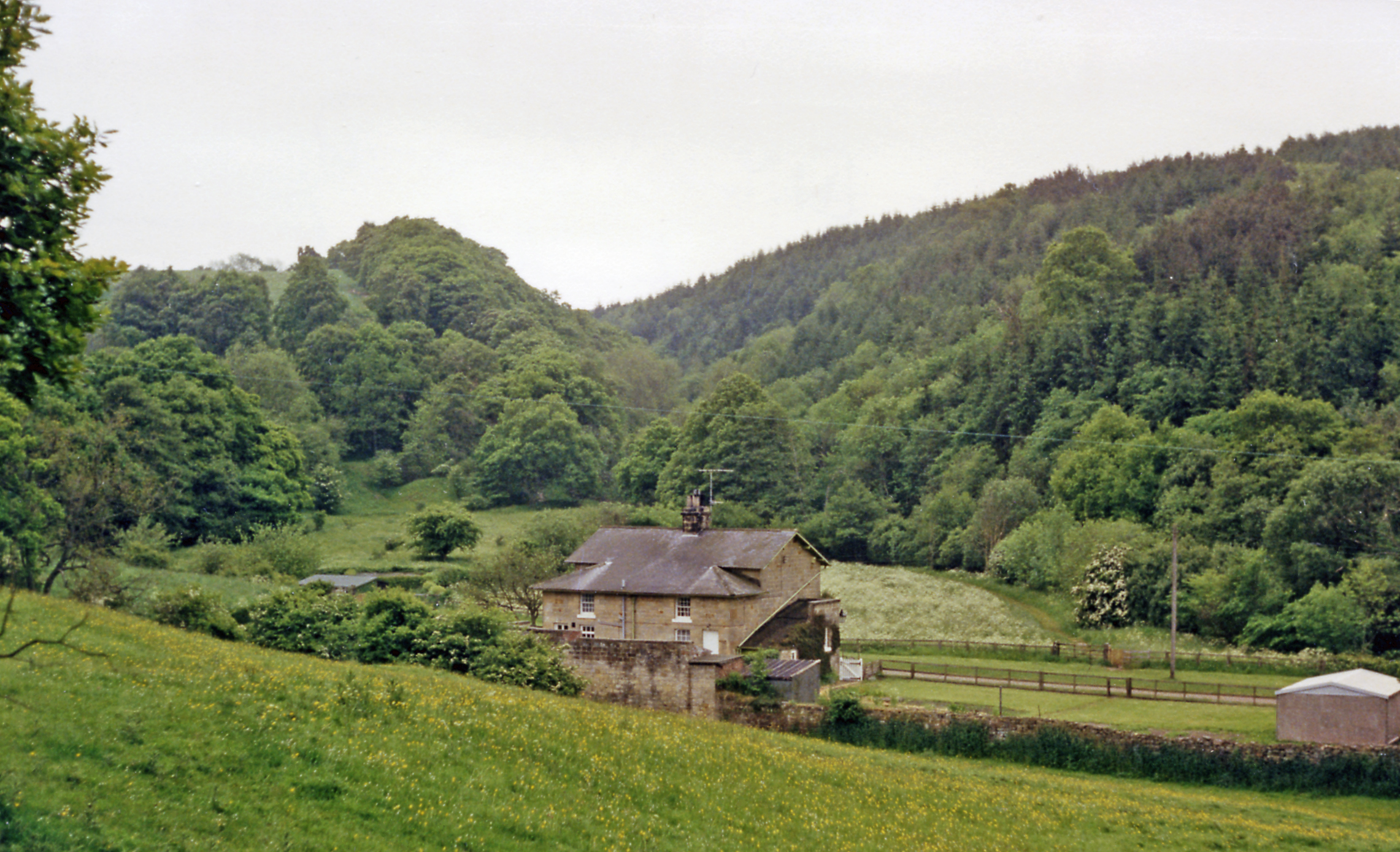
- Beckhole station site 1988

General information
- Location: Beck Hole, North Yorkshire; England
- Coordinates: 54.407889°N 0.736475°W
- Grid reference: NZ821020

Other information
- Status: Disused

History
- Original company: Whitby and Pickering Railway
- Pre-grouping: North Eastern Railway

Key dates
- 1836: Opened
- Closed to passengers: 1 July 1865
- Reopened for passengers (summers only): 1908
- 1914: Closed for passengers
- 1951: closed completely
Location

Beckhole railway station was a railway station at Beck Hole in the North Yorkshire Moors on part of the original Whitby and Pickering Railway line. Although it was possible to travel to Beckhole in 1835, the station was opened in 1836, and closed to passengers permanently in 1914. Beckhole closed completely in 1951.

== History ==
The first part of the Whitby and Pickering Railway had extended to Tunnel Inn (Grosmont) and Beck Hole by 1835. This was a special arrangement to carry passengers from Whitby. A permanent station opened in 1836 as Beckholes, although initially it was not advertised in literature as a destination, merely the point at which horses were detached so that the carriage could be sent up the incline. It later received station status, though in the early days of railway building, tickets were bought generally from local inns, rather than from the station itself. By 1847, when the York and North Midland Railway had taken over the line, steam working was used throughout to Whitby, supplanting horse-power all along the line. This necessitated building a shed at Beckhole, for the use of steam engines, which, once they had been lowered down the incline, generally stayed operating between Whitby and Beckhole.

The single track engine shed had a water tank, and was located to the immediate north of what were two railway cottages designed by George Townsend Andrews. These two cottages were later combined into one dwelling as Incline Cottage, a grade II listed building.

A deviation of the line was built in 1865 to avoid the use of a rope-hauled inclined plane; a short section of the replaced line from Grosmont to Beck Hole remained open as the Beck Hole branch. This was used as a freight-only line delivering coal to the hamlet of Beck Hole, and forwarding out stone from Lease Rigg, and for a time, ironstone from the surrounding quarries and mines. Passenger services ceased on 1 July 1865.

From 1908 to 1914 the branch was used for summer passenger traffic from Whitby, after which the line only carried freight traffic. Freight traffic ended in 1951.

Preceding station	Disused railways	Following station
Terminus	North Eastern Railway; Grosmont Old Branch	Grosmont; Line closed, station open
Goathland Bank Top; Line and station closed	North Eastern Railway; Whitby and Pickering Railway	Grosmont; Line closed, station open
