= North Yorkshire Moors Railway =

Heritage railway in North Yorkshire, England

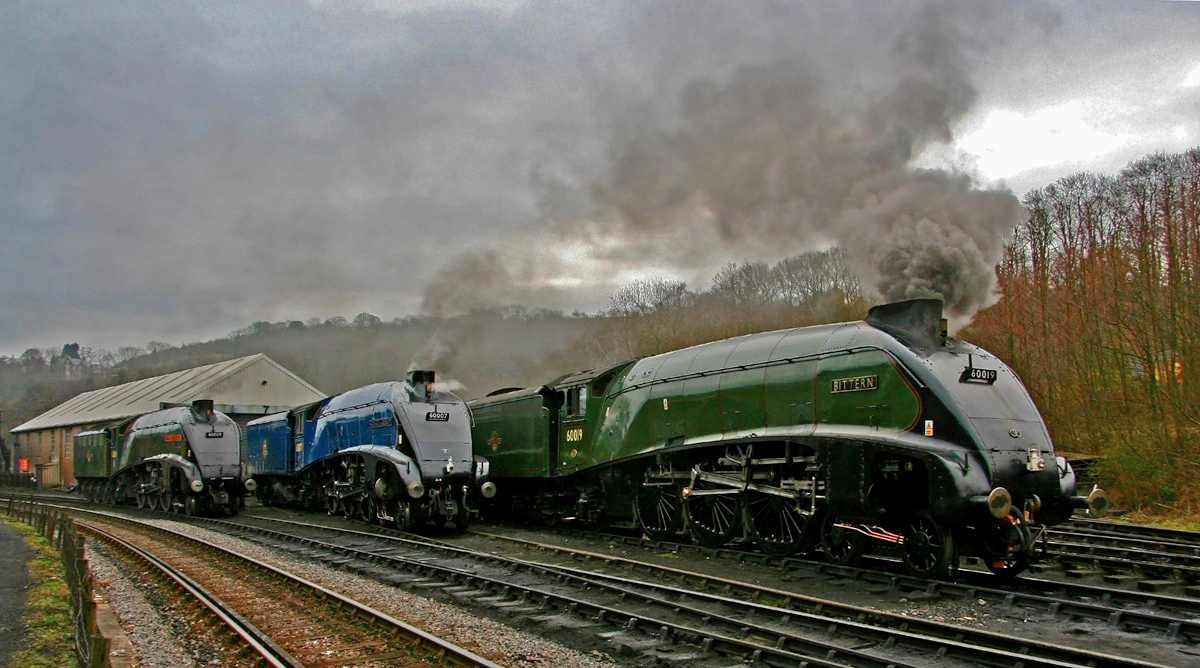
- Three LNER Class A4 locomotives at Grosmont loco shed in 2008
- Locale: North Yorkshire
- Terminus: Whitby and Pickering
- Connections: Network Rail (at Grosmont)

Commercial operations
- Name: North Eastern Railway
- Built by: George Stephenson
- Original gauge: 4 ft 8 1/2 in (1,435 mm) standard gauge

Preserved operations
- Operated by: North Yorkshire Moors Railway Enterprises plc
- Stations: 6 (Including Whitby)
- Length: 18 miles (29 km); 24 miles (39 km) when extended over Network Rail metals to Whitby
- Preserved gauge: 4 ft 8 1/2 in (1,435 mm) standard gauge

Commercial history
- Opened: 1836
- Closed: 1965

Preservation history
- 1967: NYMR Preservation Society formed
- 1 May 1973: NYMR reopened
- 1975: Pickering re-opened officially
- 1981: Newton Dale halt opened to the public
- 2007: Some services extended to Whitby
- 2012: Pickering railway station re-roofed (station roof re-instated) for the first time in 60 years.
- Headquarters: Pickering, North Yorkshire

Website
- www.nymr.co.uk
Route map
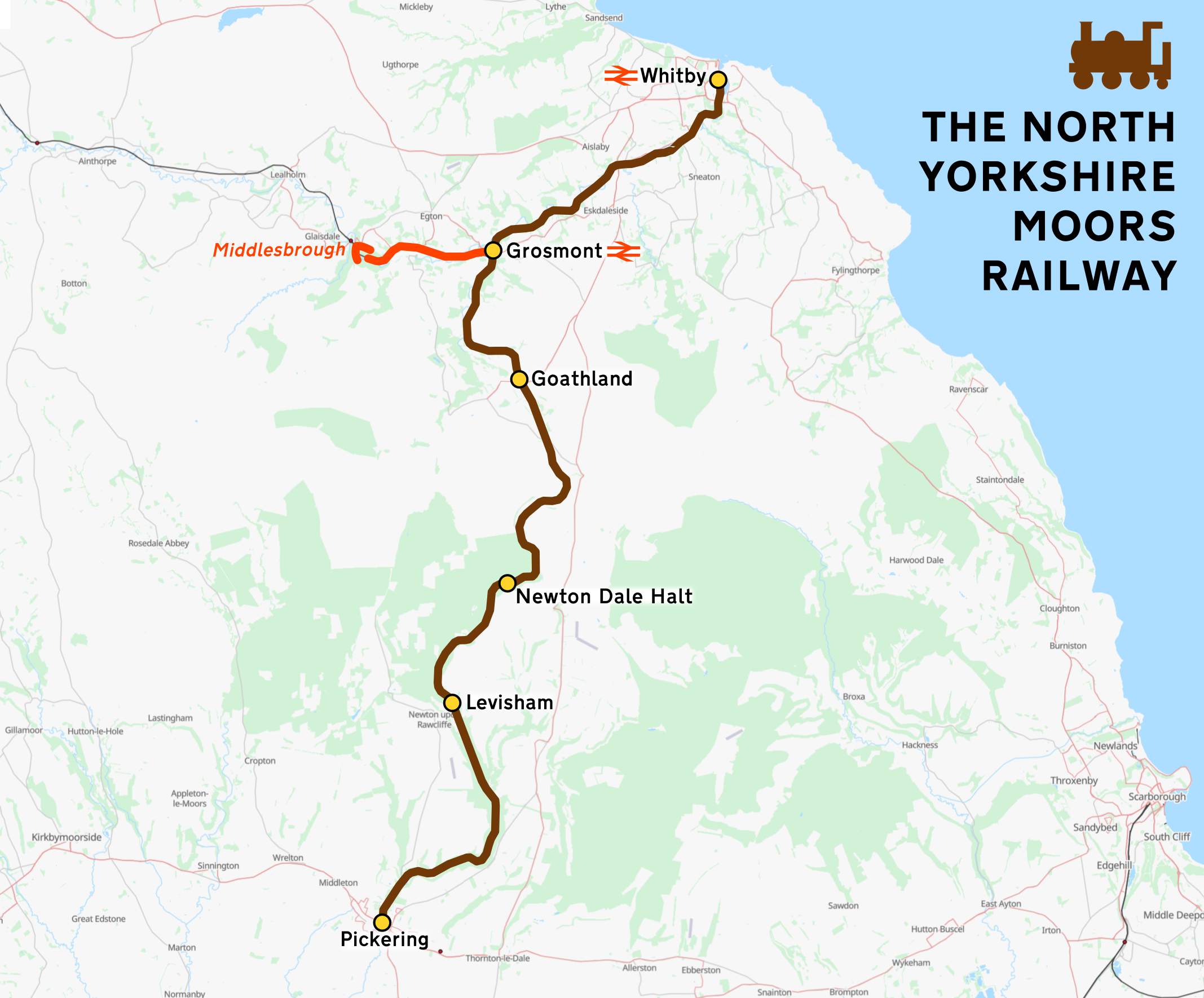

The North Yorkshire Moors Railway (NYMR) is a heritage railway in North Yorkshire, England, that runs through the North York Moors National Park. First opened in 1836 as the Whitby and Pickering Railway, the railway was planned in 1831 by George Stephenson as a means of opening up trade routes inland from the then important seaport of Whitby. The line between Grosmont and Rillington was closed in 1965 and the section between Grosmont and Pickering was reopened in 1973 by the North York Moors Historical Railway Trust Ltd. The preserved line is now a tourist attraction and has been awarded several industry accolades.

In 2007, the railway started to run regular services over the 6-mile (10 km) section of the Esk Valley Line north of Grosmont to Whitby. In 2014, a second platform was opened at Whitby which allowed the NYMR to run an enhanced service and led to passenger numbers in the same year of nearly 350,000 people.

As of 2020, the railway runs for 24 miles (39 km). It is owned and operated by a charitable trust, with 100 staff who work full time, 50 seasonal staff, and over 550 volunteers. The complement includes 30 engineers. As of 2020, the "NYMR is the UK’s most popular heritage railway" according to a news report.

== Overview ==
The NYMR carries more passengers than any other heritage railway in the UK and may be one of the busiest steam heritage lines in the world, carrying 355,000 passengers in 2010. The 18-mile (29 km) railway is the third-longest standard gauge heritage line in the United Kingdom, after the West Somerset Railway (22 3/4 miles (37 km)) and the Wensleydale Railway (22 miles (35 km)), and runs across the North York Moors from Pickering via Levisham, Newton Dale, Goathland and terminating at Grosmont.

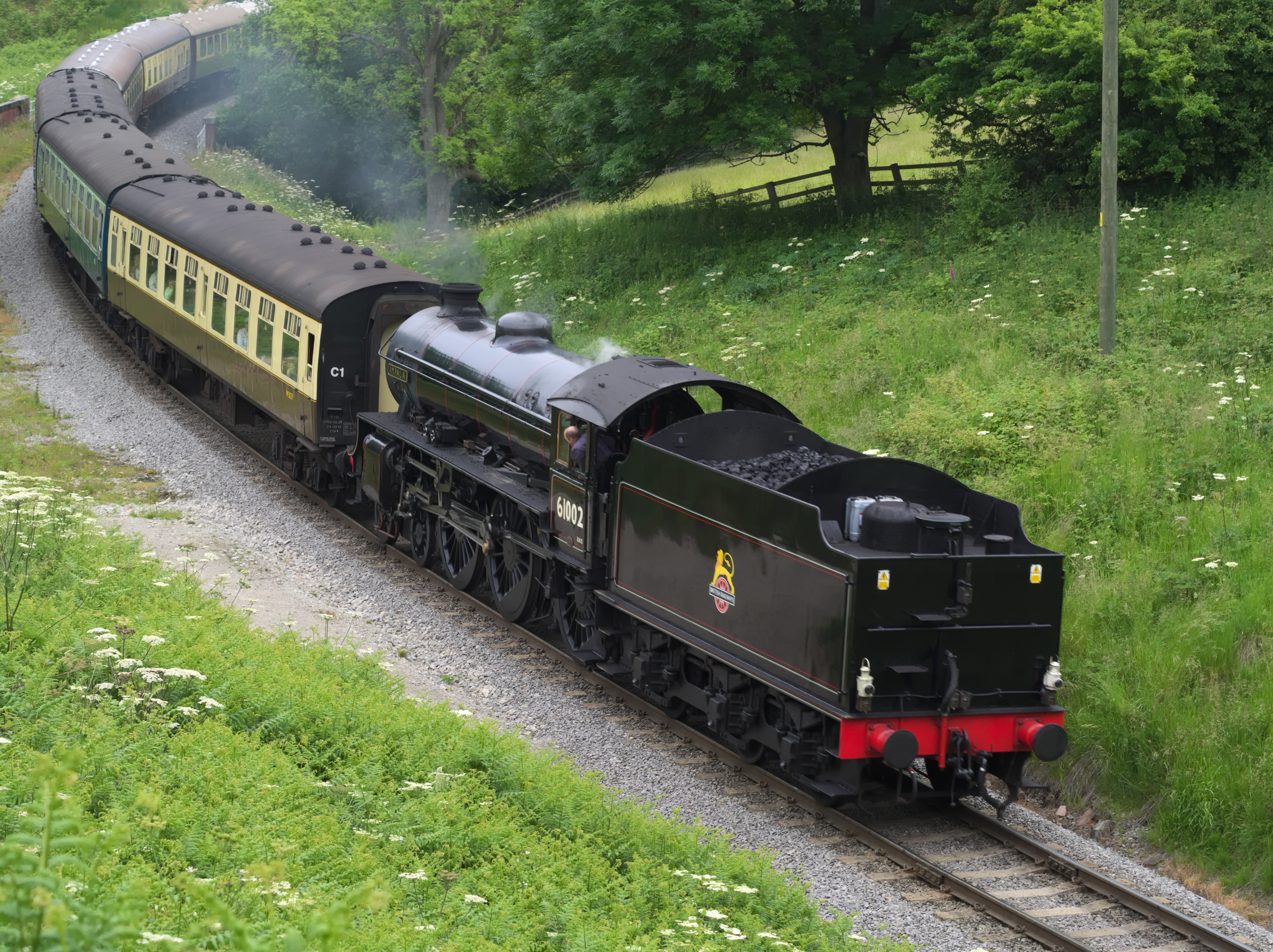
North Yorkshire Moors Railway north of Goathland

Some heritage rail operations continue along the Network Rail tracks to Whitby. The railway is formed from the middle section of the former Whitby, Pickering and Malton Line, which was closed in 1965 as part of the Beeching cuts.

The NYMR is owned by the North York Moors Historical Railway Trust Ltd, a charitable trust and accredited museum, and is operated by its wholly owned subsidiary North Yorkshire Moors Railway Enterprises plc. It is mostly operated and staffed by volunteers.

During most years, the trains run daily from the beginning of April to the end of October, and on weekends and selected holidays during the winter, with no service from 24 to 27 December. Services are mostly steam-hauled; however, heritage diesel power is sometimes used. At the height of the running timetable, trains depart hourly from each station. As well as the normal passenger running, there are dining services on some evenings and weekends. The extension of steam operated services to the seaside town of Whitby has proved popular.

== History ==
The North Yorkshire Moors Railway was first opened in 1836 as the Whitby and Pickering Railway. The railway was planned in 1831 by George Stephenson as a means of opening up trade routes inland from the then important seaport of Whitby. The initial railway was designed and built to be used by horse-drawn carriages. Construction was carried out by navvies and coordinated by top engineers. Their three main achievements were cutting a 120-yard (110 m) tunnel through rock at Grosmont, constructing a rope-worked incline system at Beck Hole and traversing the marshy and deep Fen Bog using a bed of timber and sheep fleeces. The tunnel is believed to be one of the oldest railway tunnels in England.

In its first year of operation, the railway carried 10,000 tonnes (11,000 tons) of stone from Grosmont to Whitby, as well as 6,000 passengers, who paid a fare of 1 shilling to sit on the roof of a coach, or 1 shilling 3 pence to sit inside. It took two and a half hours to travel from Whitby to Pickering.

In 1845, the railway was acquired by the York and North Midland Railway who re-engineered the line to allow the use of steam locomotives. They also constructed the permanent stations and other structures along the line which still remain today. The Beck Hole incline was re-equipped with a steam powered stationary engine and iron rope. They also added the line south from Pickering so that the line had a connection to York and beyond.

In 1854 the York and North Midland Railway became part of the North Eastern Railway. Steam locomotives could not operate on the Beck Hole incline; so in the early 1860s the North Eastern Railway started construction of an alternative route which opened in 1865 – this is the route which is still in use today. The original route is now a 3 1/2-mile (6 km) rail trail named the Rail Trail.

In 1923 the North Eastern Railway was absorbed into the London and North Eastern Railway as a result of the Railways Act 1921. In 1948 nationalisation meant that British Railways took control. During this time, little changed on the line. However, in his controversial report Dr Beeching declared that the Whitby-Pickering line was uneconomic and listed it for closure; the last passenger service ran on 6 March 1965 with freight continuing until July 1966. The line was used in June 1965 to house the Royal Train for the Duke of Edinburgh's visit to the RAF Fylingdales early warning station.

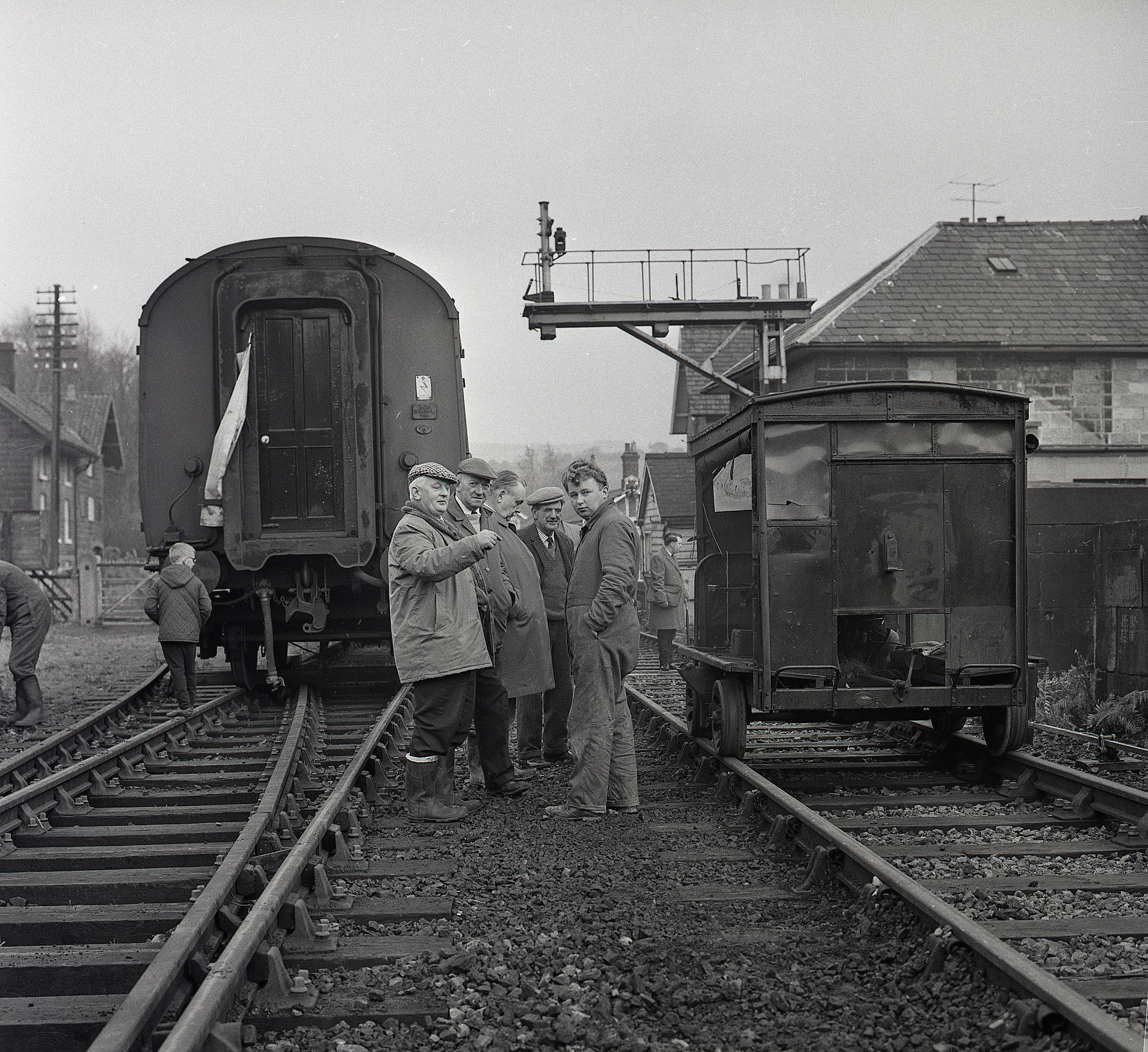
North Yorkshire Moors Railway Preservation Society, 1968

In 1967, the NYMR Preservation Society was formed, and negotiations began for the purchase of the line. After running various open weekends and steam galas during the early 1970s (by permission of British Railways) the NYMRPS transformed itself into a charitable trust to ensure the future of the railway, and became The North York Moors Historical Railway Trust Ltd in 1972. Purchase of the line was completed and the necessary light railway order, the British Railways Board (Whitby and Pickering) Light Railway Order 1974 (SI 1974/1857) was obtained, giving powers to operate the railway. The railway was able to reopen for running in 1973 as the North Yorkshire Moors Railway, with much of the traction provided by the North Eastern Locomotive Preservation Group.

Services to Whitby were also mooted as a possibility; one of the first was in 1987 when 92220 Evening Star worked a service between Pickering and Whitby. Since then, services ran sporadically with third party operators (such as the West Coast Railway Company in the early 2000s) as the NYMR was not a licensed company authorised to operate over Network Rail metals. From 2007, regular trains operated over the Esk Valley Line from Grosmont to Whitby, thus providing a service over the entire length of the original Whitby and Pickering Railway. Services were further improved in 2014 by the re-opening of a second platform at Whitby to enable services to increase from three out and back workings a day to five. After a year of operation, the NMYR stated that 120,000 people had travelled over the new operating section to Whitby and that overall in 2014, the railway had attracted nearly 350,000 visitors.

Interior of a NYMR coach

Interior of a NYMR coach

The preserved line is now a tourist attraction and has been awarded several tourist industry and heritage accolades.

In 2017, the NYMR received one half of a planned £9.2 million grant from the National Lottery Heritage Fund. The balance was paid in May 2019 and was to be used towards the renewal of iron bridges at Goathland railway station and a new carriage shed at Pickering. A report in February 2021 said that the railway had received a £1.9 million grant from the government's Culture Recovery Fund.

The restrictions and lockdowns necessitated by the COVID-19 pandemic in 2020, and into 2021, required the railway to cease operations for months. A crisis appeal was successful in raising over £400,000 in donations by September; that had increased to £440,000 by January 2021. The 2020 season was postponed by four months and events were cancelled due to the pandemic. The railway has received £295,000 in support funding from the Culture Recovery Fund.

A new carriage stabling facility was opened in September 2021, with space for 40 carriages.

On 12 June 2023, King Charles III arrived at the Pickering station on the British Royal Train, pulled by the LNER Class A3 4472 Flying Scotsman locomotive, "after a trip through the countryside on the North Yorkshire Moors Railway", according to a news report. The visit marked the 100th anniversary of the locomotive and the 50th anniversary of the current version of the railway being operated by volunteers. The driver of the Flying Scotsman made this comment at the time: "He's a regular because he has been here before when he opened the station in 2000".

== Stations ==
Point	Coordinates (Links to map resources)	OS Grid Ref	Notes
Pickering	54.2471°N 0.7785°W	SE79698417	
Levisham	54.3082°N 0.7443°W	SE81799101	
Newton Dale Halt	54.3424°N 0.7176°W	SE83469485	
Goathland	54.400°N 0.712°W	NZ83710126	
Grosmont	54.4360°N 0.7250°W	NZ82790525	
Grosmont (Network Rail)	54.4364°N 0.7254°W	NZ82770530	NYMR trains do not use platform 1 in normal operation
Whitby (Network Rail)	54.4849°N 0.6152°W	NZ89811083	NYMR trains run over Network Rail tracks to Whitby

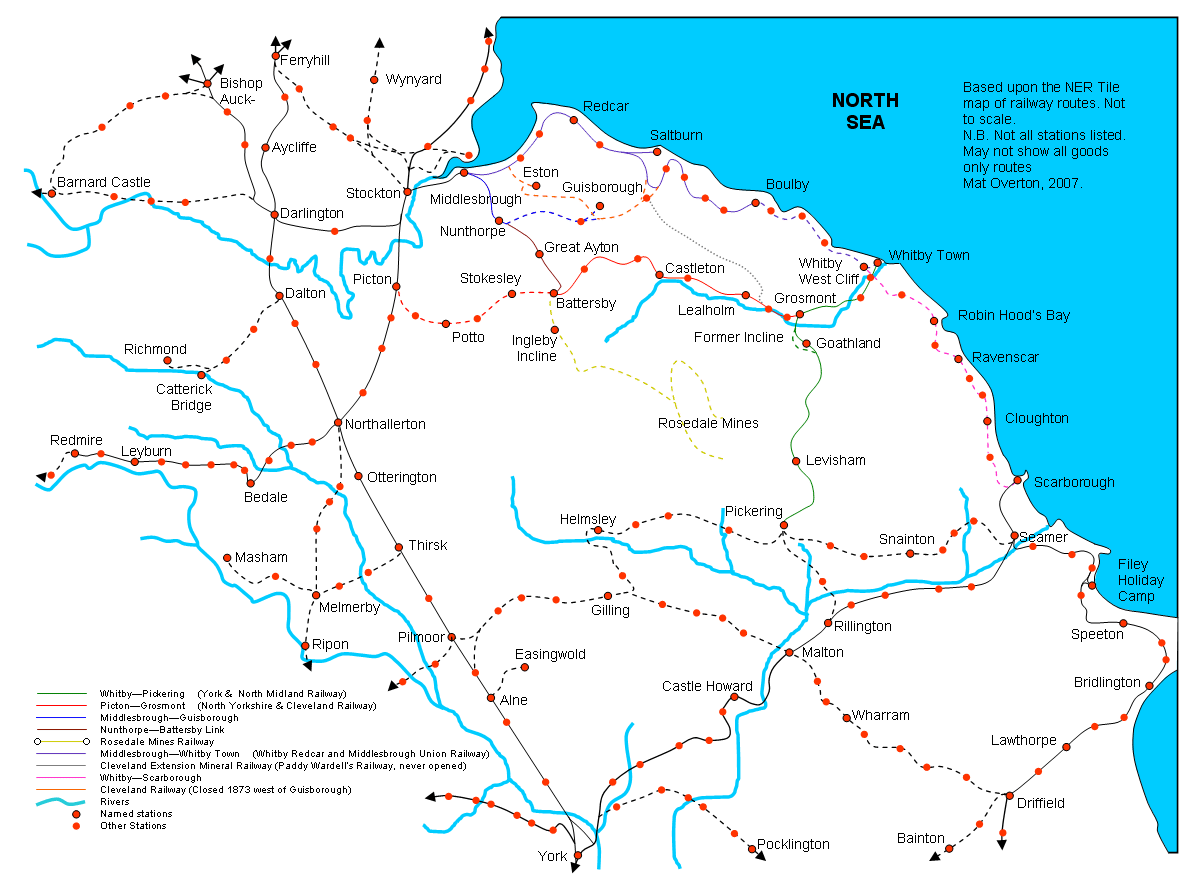
North Yorkshire Moors Railway and surrounding lines

- Pickering is the southern terminus of the railway and serves the market town of that name. The station has been restored to its 1937 condition with help from the Heritage Lottery Fund. Original fixtures and fittings have been installed in the booking office and parcels office, as well as in the tea room. A park-and-ride service is provided to keep traffic out of the town during busy periods. The station is home to the railway's carriage workshops, and there is also a turntable. Originally Pickering station had an overall roof designed by the architect G. T. Andrews. This roof was removed by British Railways in 1952 due to corrosion. A replacement roof was fitted to the station between January and April 2011, as part of the NYMR's Train of Thought project. Other work includes a learning centre and a visitor centre behind the down platform. Originally, the line continued south of Pickering to join the Malton to Scarborough Line at Rillington Junction but this track has since been lifted with the last trip to Malton running on 1 July 1966, the day the freight services were withdrawn.
- Farwath railway station (or Farworth) was a small railway halt located between Pickering and Levisham; however, the halt was subsequently closed and demolished. Railway-built cottages still exist in this location. There is some doubt as to whether or not there were actually any station buildings here. There was a signal box, which closed when the line was singled between Levisham and Pickering in the First World War. Additionally, there was a public delivery siding, but mapping from 1913 does not list Farworth as being a station, though it does show a gravel siding.

Levisham railway station

- Levisham is a small countryside station set in the Newton Dale valley. The location of the station is notable, as it is nearly two miles (3 km) from the village which it serves, and whose name it takes. The area is used for walking and a variety of wildlife and flowers can be found within a short distance of the station. Levisham Station has been renovated and preserved to represent a small NER country station, c. 1912. The station has a traditional camping coach, which is let for holidays. Since 2007, the North Yorkshire Moors Railway's artist in residence, Christopher Ware, has used a studio at the station.
- Newton Dale Halt is a remote walkers' request stop in Cropton Forest. There are forest walks of varying lengths.

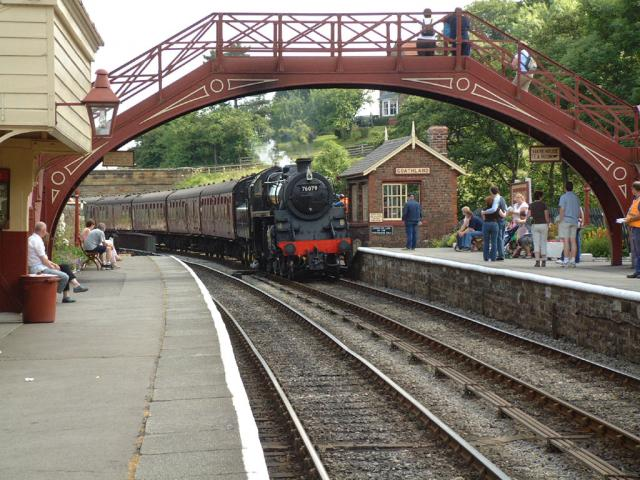
BR Standard 4MT 76079 arrives in Goathland station

- Goathland is almost unchanged since its construction in 1865. The station has been restored to represent an NER country station post-First World War, c. 1922. The station is popular with tourists due to its appearances in Yorkshire Television's Heartbeat and the first of the Harry Potter films (see below). The station has a newly refurbished tea room which is inside a goods warehouse. The station also has a traditional camping coach, which is let for holidays.
- Grosmont was the railway's permanent northern terminus until 2007, when trains began operating into Whitby on a regular basis. The locomotive sheds are situated here, just south of the tunnel through which trains run en route to Goathland and beyond. The station itself has been restored to the British Railways style c. 1952. It has full facilities including a shop, café serving cooked meals, toilets including disabled, a ticket office and a waiting room. The shed area has facilities to provide water and coal for the engines, as well as stabling. The running shed is usually open to public access at one end, where stationary engines can be viewed. These are usually either operational but not in service that day, or undergoing light repair work. Also open to the public is the deviation shed which houses locomotives and stock owned by NELPG as well as a small display about the history of the organisation. A number of other sheds not available for public access are used for the maintenance and overhaul of the engines. At Grosmont, the line connects with the Network Rail operated Esk Valley Line, where passengers may change trains to travel to the coast at Whitby, or inland to Middlesbrough and the rest of the national network. Thus, platform one of the station is served by Northern Rail services, whilst platforms two, three and four are used by the NYMR.
- Whitby is, on many operating days, the railway's northern terminus. All but two of the various timetables see steam trains operating through from Pickering, including daily throughout July and August except on Sundays. When NYMR trains terminate at Grosmont rather than Whitby at off-peak times, connecting trains with Northern Rail are usually available at Grosmont, allowing passengers to begin their journey at Whitby and board a steam-hauled train at Grosmont through to Goathland or Pickering. Facilities available at Whitby station include ticket office and shop. National Rail tickets and Railcards are also available to purchase. In August 2014 a second platform was opened at the station to cater for the NYMR's trains.

== Locomotives ==
=== Steam locomotives ===
Class	Number	Condition	Owner	Image	Reference
Lambton tank 0-6-2T	5	Under overhaul	NYMR		
Tramways de Bruxelles à Evere et Extensions 0-4-0VBT	8 'Lucie'	Under overhaul	Paul Middleton		
Lambton tank 0-6-2T	29 "Peggy"	Operational	NYMR		
LSWR S15 class 4-6-0	825	Under overhaul	Essex Locomotive Society		
SR V class 4-4-0	926 'Repton'	Operational	NYMR		
USATC S160 2-8-0	2253 "Omaha"	Under overhaul	Peter Best		
WD Austerity 2-10-0	3672 'Dame Vera Lynn'	Under overhaul	NYMR		
SR West Country class 4-6-2	34101 'Hartland'	Under overhaul	Privately owned		
LMS Stanier Class 5 4-6-0	44806	Operational	Peter Best		
LMS Stanier Class 5 4-6-0	45428 "Eric Treacy"	Operational	NYMR		
LNER Q6 0-8-0	63395	Operational	NELPG		
LNER J27 0-6-0	65894	Operational	NELPG		
BR Standard Class 4 4-6-0	75029 "The Green Knight"	Under overhaul	NYMR		
BR standard class 4 2-6-4T	80135	Under overhaul	NYMR		
BR standard class 4 2-6-4T	80136	Stored	NYMR		
BR standard class 9F 2-10-0	92134	Operational	David Shepherd		

=== Diesel Locomotives, Multiple Units, and Shunters ===
Class	Number	Condition	Owner	Image	Reference
BR Class 24	D5032 "Helen Turner"	Under overhaul			
BR Class 24	D5061	Stored			
BR Class 25	D7628 "Sybilla"	Stored			
BR Class 31	31128 'Charybdis'	Operational	Nemesis Rail		
BR Class 31	31466	Operational	Privately owned		
BR Class 37	37264	Operational			
BR Class 47	47077 "North Star"	Operational	Diesel & Electric Preservation Group		
BR Class 101	101685 "Daisy"	Operational			

== Future and possibility of expansion ==
The possibility of reopening the missing 8-mile (13 km) section between Malton via Rillington Junction (on the York – Malton – Scarborough Line) and Pickering has often been discussed. It is included in a list of rail lines, where campaigns exist for reopening, issued by the Campaign for Better Transport.

This might allow the running of steam services from York to Whitby again. To achieve this would require considerable engineering work, as the former trackbed has been built upon with houses and a supermarket.

Reinstating this missing rail link was adopted as a policy objective by the North Yorkshire County Council some years ago; the NYMHRT board agreed to support this policy in principle, whilst having reservations about its implementation as they believed the necessary upgrade works were costly and that it would harm their business stating that they had concerns about "the effect on the railway".

Hopes for this have been dampened as of October 2014 with reports that the managing director of the NYMR stating that they did not support any trains running along their tracks.

=== Bridge and wheels appeal ===
In March 2009, the railway announced that bridge 30 over the Eller Beck at Darnholme near Goathland needed to be repaired/replaced over the winter of 2009/2010, otherwise the railway would be forced to close. The railway therefore launched an appeal to raise £1 million to cover the costs of the bridge work with any excess raised going towards the restoration of locomotive 80135. £610,000 was raised in time, and the bridge was replaced over the winter-Christmas/new year period of 2009/2010, with the first trains crossing over the new bridge in March 2010. The bridge was formally opened by Pete Waterman on 27 March 2010.

An appeal to raise funds to repair Bridge 42 over the river Murk Esk, was launched in 2026.

=== Yorkshire's 'magnificent journey' appeal ===
During 2017, the NYMR announced it was applying to the Heritage Lottery Fund, as part of a new appeal to keep the whole preserved railway running for the next 50 years. The bid attracted £4.4 million in HLF funding and the appeal also donations from other funding streams such as the Rural Payments Agency, which donated £1.97 million.

The aim of this appeal includes a series of individual projects such as,

1. The renewal and repair of a total of three bridges around Goathland.
2. Provide fuss free access for accommodation aboard every passenger train.
3. The construction of a carriage shed (accommodating up to 40 carriages) at Pickering.
4. A dedicated education carriage at Goathland.
5. The creation of a new volunteer hostel at Grosmont.
6. A volunteering development programme, recruiting new generations of volunteers in the foreseeable future.
7. Railway apprenticeship schemes, with offers of training in engineering.
8. A lineside conservation initiative, raising the awareness of conservation issues.

In early 2021, the project benefitted from £296,000 from the Culture Recovery Fund.

As of 11 January 2020, bridge 27 at Goathland was removed; work to replace it was underway in March 2020. Bridges 24 & 25 were scheduled for replacement in early 2022.

== Special events ==
The NYMR runs several special events through the year, usually revolving around a particular theme.

- Steam galas are weekend events, sometimes extended to Friday and/or Monday. On these days, a full timetabled service is run alongside extra trains, such as local shuttle services and demonstration freight trains. The LNER gala in April 2008 featured all three of the UK's operational Gresley A4 Pacifics, and attracted thousands of visitors.
- Santa Special trains are run in the Christmas period, complete with elves, Santa's grotto, presents and mince pies. The winter scenery of the North York Moors National Park adds to the charm of these events.

== Television and film appearances ==
The railway has been seen both on television and in film. Michael Palin hosted and produced an episode of the first series of Great Railway Journeys of the World, titled "Confessions of a Train Spotter". Filmed during late July/early August 1980, it featured a 15-minute segment filmed as he travelled the entire railway and visited the repair shops. Goathland station has been used as Hogsmeade in the Harry Potter films, the 2016 Dad's Army film and Aidensfield in the 1960s drama Heartbeat. Pickering station was used in the films Possession, Keeping Mum and Downton Abbey. Other appearances include Casualty, Brideshead Revisited, All Creatures Great and Small, The Royal, Poirot, the Sherlock Holmes television series, and the films Testament of Youth, Phantom Thread and The Runaways.

The railway has also featured in the documentary Yorkshire Steam, which ran for two series on local television; in the second series of Great British Railway Journeys; and in the Channel 5 documentary The Yorkshire Steam Railway: All Aboard, with series three being aired during February and March 2020. Goathland station features in the 1985 music video for Simply Red's Holding Back the Years, along with BR Standard Class 4MT Tank No. 80135. The railway has also appeared in a series of Thomas & Friends learning segments, with LNER Class A4 60007 Sir Nigel Gresley.

The production of Downton Abbey film used Pickering station on the railway in its opening scene; the train is shown travelling through several communities.

In April 2021, scenes for the film Mission: Impossible – Dead Reckoning Part One, were filmed on the railway, at Levisham. Filming for Indiana Jones and the Dial of Destiny also took place on a section of the railway, in June 2021, in the village of Grosmont.

== Accidents and incidents ==
- On 21 May 2012, a steam locomotive pushing carriages was accidentally started in the wrong direction at Grosmont and killed a volunteer guard, Bob Lund, who was uncoupling carriages.
- On 21 September 2021, Class 20 diesel locomotive 20189 collided with a rake of carriages at Grosmont. Five passengers were injured. A Rail Accident Investigation Branch investigation revealed that the NYMR could not prove that the traction inspector in charge of the locomotive at the time of the accident was qualified to drive that class of locomotive. Consequently, the Office of Rail and Road issued the NYMR with an improvement notice.

== Awards ==
- 2001 National Railway Heritage Awards, Westinghouse Signalling Award, for the new signal box at Grosmont built to an 1870s design.
- 2006 National Railway Heritage Award, for the provision of staff, public and disabled toilet facilities adjacent to Goathland goods shed in a converted goods van; thus providing these essential facilities in a manner that blended in with their surroundings.
- 2007 Best Visitor Attraction of 2007 (in the 50,000 visitors and over category), awarded by the Yorkshire Moors & Coast Tourism Partnership – a consortium of tourism expertise from across the districts of Hambleton, Ryedale and Scarborough. "What really impressed the judges was the consistently high standard of customer service which was in evidence when his members carried out ‘mystery shopping’ visits during the year".
- 2007 Large Railway of the Year, awarded by members of the Heritage Railway Association, the umbrella body for over 250 heritage railways and museums from across the United Kingdom. 'The association praised NYMR for the way in which it successfully pioneered the operation of regular steam-hauled services on Network Rail’s Esk Valley route between Grosmont and Whitby, using volunteer crews. The judges also acknowledged the contribution (in excess of £15,000) made by the railway following the holding of a gala in support of the Severn Valley Railway following their devastating flood damage, especially as the NYMR also suffered from flooding but not to the same degree'.
- 2009 Best Visitor Attraction of 2009 (in the 50,000 visitors and over category), awarded by the Yorkshire Moors & Coast Tourism Partnership – a consortium of tourism expertise from across the districts of Hambleton, Ryedale and Scarborough. This award was jointly won by the NYMR and Eden Camp.
- 2010 Marketing Campaign of the Year awarded by Visit York.
- 2014 National Railway Heritage Awards, Best Small Project Award, for renovating the lamp room at Levisham station which burnt down in the 1960s.
- 2015 National Railway Heritage Awards, Siemens Signalling Award, Grosmont north end signalling.
- 2015 National Railway Heritage Awards, Modern Traction Award, awarded to the railway after keeping its diesel fleet active during a shortage of steam locomotives.
