= Goathland Bank Top railway station =

Disused railway station in North Yorkshire, England

Goathland Bank Top
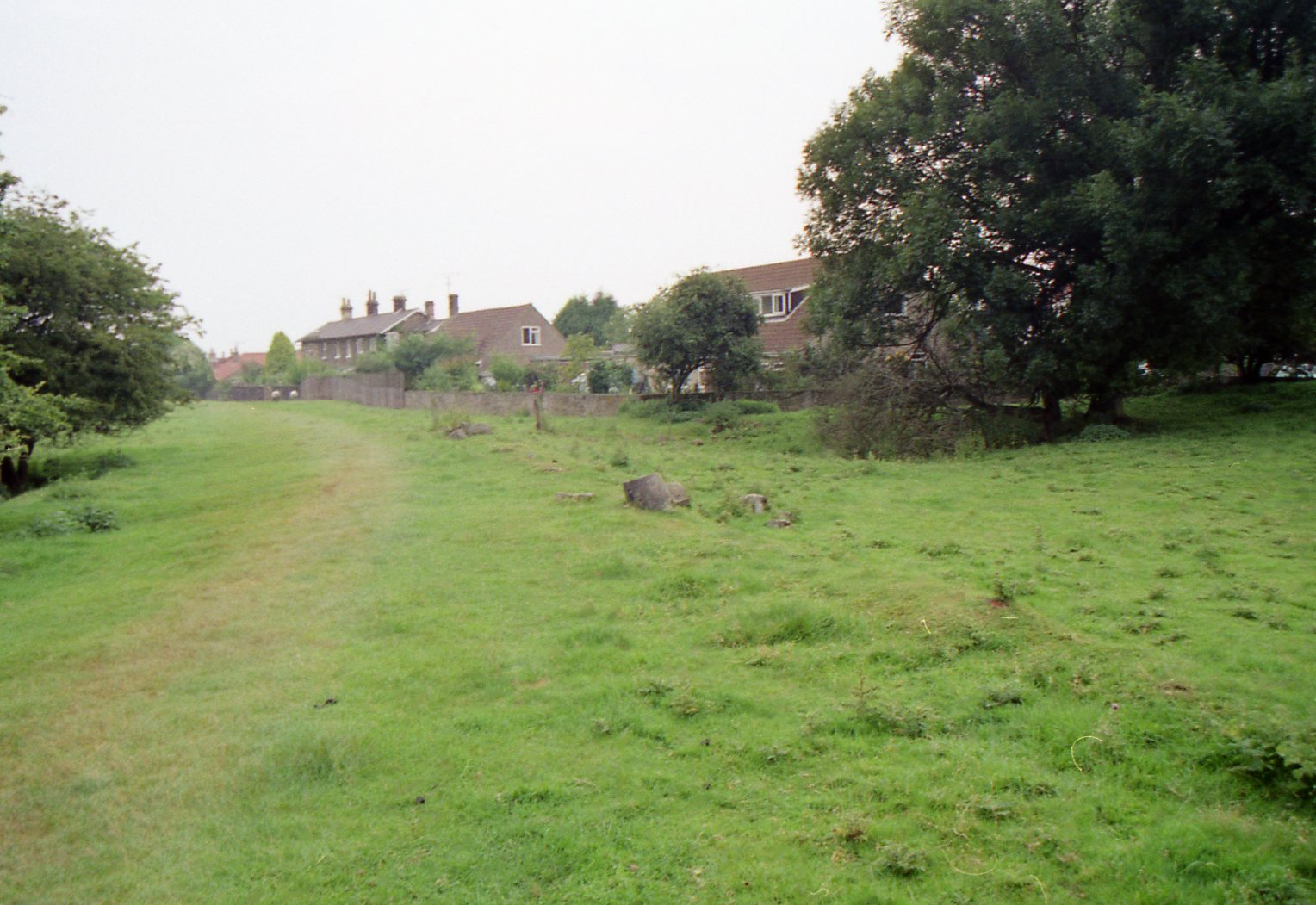
- The site of the station, c. 2000

General information
- Location: Goathland, North Yorkshire; England
- Coordinates: 54.402°N 0.719°W
- Grid reference: NZ831015

Other information
- Status: Disused

History
- Original company: Whitby and Pickering Railway

Key dates
- 26 May 1836: Opened
- 1 July 1865: Closed
Location

Goathland Bank Top was a short lived, early, railway station in Goathland, North Yorkshire, England. The station at the top of the Beckhole Incline (sometimes referred to as the Goathland Incline) was opened with the opening throughout of the Whitby and Pickering Railway (W&P) on Thursday 26 May 1836. The station closed with the opening of the NER's Deviation line (which bypassed the by then anachronistic cable worked incline) on 1 July 1865. Thus, the station had a life of less than thirty years. A new Goathland station (initially called Goathland Mill to distinguish it from the earlier station) was opened on the deviation line.

== Whitby and Pickering Railway (1836-45) ==
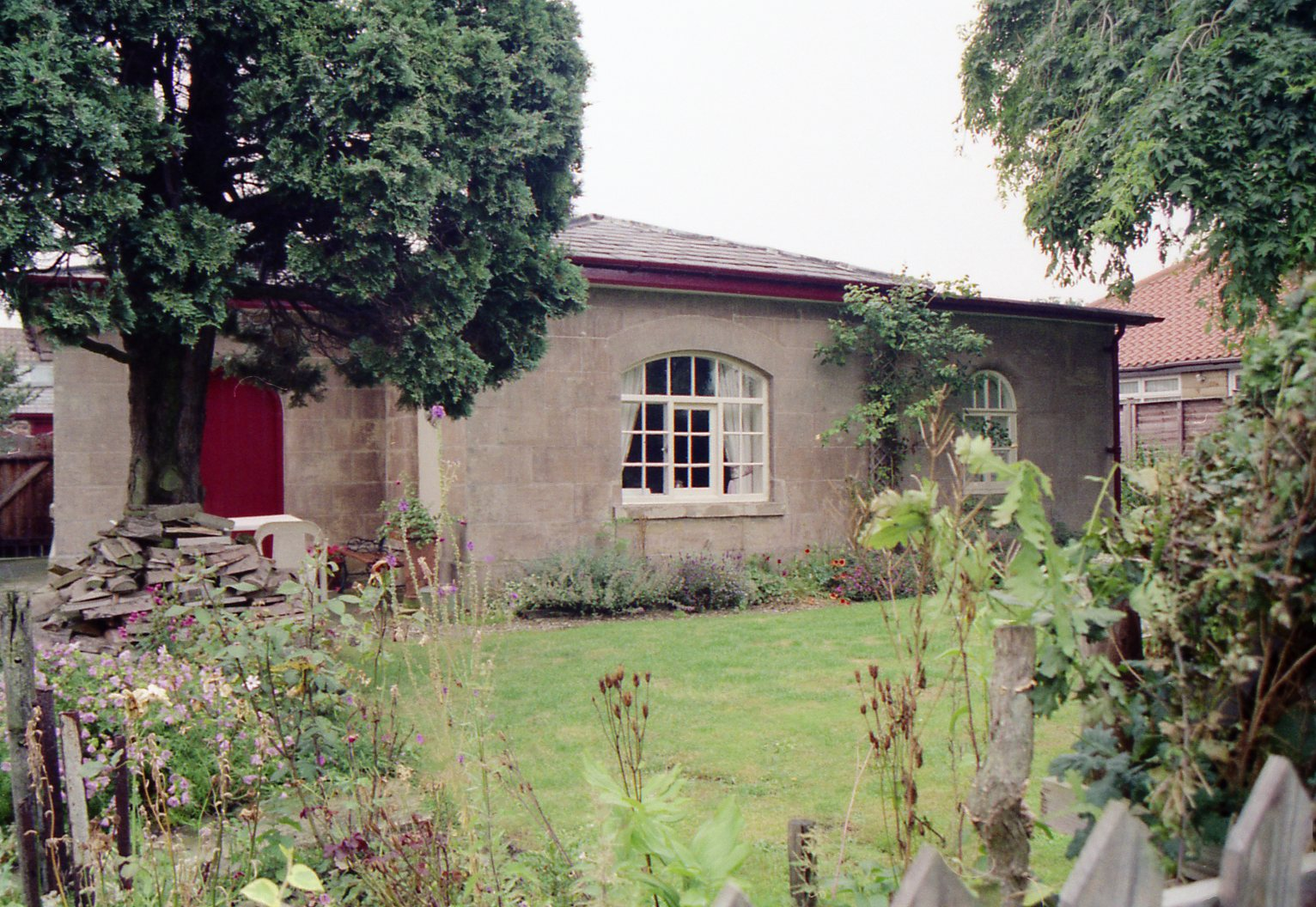
'Ash Tree Cottage, the W&P's overseers house situated at the top of the incline

Little is known about what facilities the horse-worked W&P provided at Goathland, they did build an 'overseers cottage' at the head of the incline, that cottage survives, now known as 'Ash Tree Cottage', it is probably the only surviving inhabited W&P structure which is now a grade II listed building that passed into private ownership in 1913.

The incline was built with a 1-in-15 gradient to the design of the W&P's Engineer George Stephenson and was self-acting with the descending traffic hauling up the ascending traffic. The descending coach or wagons was given additional weight by means of a wheeled water butt, which was filled before descending, then drained at the bottom and returned to the top with the next ascending load. The machinery for working the inclined plane was obtained from Robert Stephenson at a cost of £135 14s 6d. The original rope for the incline manufactured by Mr. Henry Simpson was 1,500 yards long and 5.5 inches in circumference.

The W&P built a stable 'at the top of Goathland Inclined Plane', the directors accepting a tender from a Mr. Langdale of £230. The York & North Midland Railway (Y&NM) replaced the water gravity system with a stationary steam engine in 1846.

== Preservation ==
A historic Rail Trail follows the original alignment gives away the one-time presence of a railway. A track traces the original rail alignment, the former W&P cottage remains at the top of the incline.

Preceding station	Disused railways	Following station
Levisham	Whitby and Pickering Railway	Beckhole
