= Grosmont railway station =

Railway station in North Yorkshire, England

Grosmont
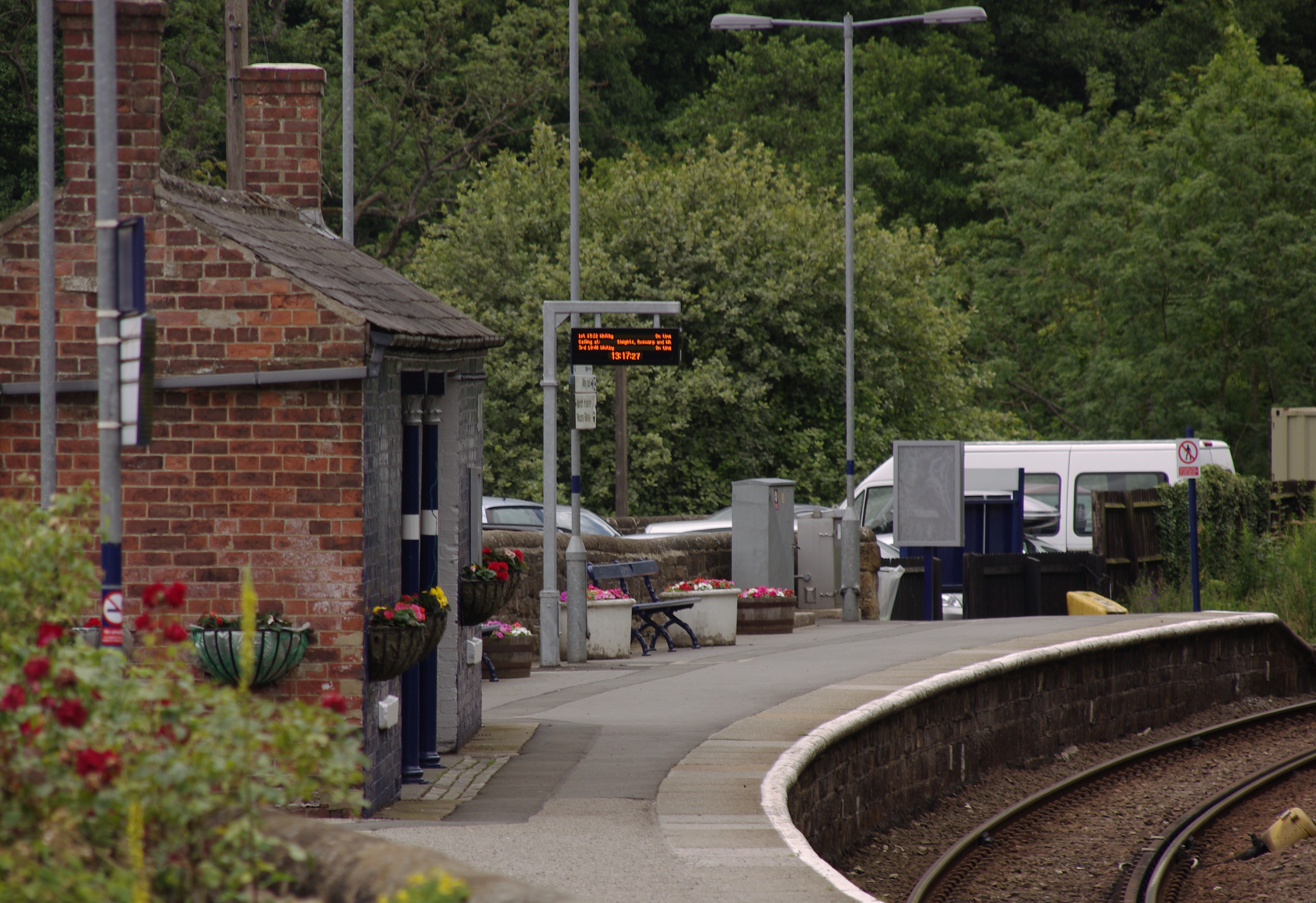

General information
- Location: Grosmont, North Yorkshire; England
- Coordinates: 54°26′11″N 0°43′31″W
- Grid reference: NZ828052
- Manager: Northern Trains; North Yorkshire Moors Railway
- Platforms: 4 (1 National Rail) (3 North Yorkshire Moors Railway)
- Tracks: 4

Other information
- Station code: GMT
- Classification: DfT category F2

History
- Original company: Whitby and Pickering Railway
- Pre-grouping: North Eastern Railway
- Post-grouping: London and North Eastern Railway; British Rail (North Eastern Region)

Key dates
- 8 June 1835: Opened as Tunnel Inn
- Before June 1847: Renamed Grosmont
- 8 March 1965: Branch line to Pickering closed to passengers
- 22 April 1973: Branch line to Pickering reopened as part of North Yorkshire Moors Railway

Passengers
- 2021/22: ▲11,454
- 2022/23: ▼11,284
- 2023/24: ▲12,374
- 2024/25: ▲15,484
- 2025/26: ▲17,502
Location
- Location within North Yorkshire
Notes
- Passenger statistics from the Office of Rail and Road

Grosmont is a railway station that serves the village of Grosmont, North Yorkshire, England. It is on the Esk Valley Line, which runs between Middlesbrough and Whitby via Nunthorpe. The station, situated 29 miles 59 chains (47.9 km) from Guisborough Junction, Middlesbrough. It is owned by Network Rail and managed by Northern Trains. The station is also served by heritage services operated by the North Yorkshire Moors Railway.

== History ==
The Whitby and Pickering Railway was a horse-worked line engineered by George Stephenson, which opened between Whitby and Tunnel Inn (the station's former name) on 8 June 1835. The station was named after the tunnel required to pass from Grosmont towards Beckhole. The line to Pickering opened on 26 May the year after. By 1848, it was renamed to Grosmont. The line westwards to Castleton opened in 1865.

The North Eastern Railway built a short terrace of cottages just south of the tunnel. In later years, these were used by the North Yorkshire Moors Railway to house volunteers, but were subsequently demolished in 1989, to allow extensions to the running shed and workshops.

Two North Eastern Railway camping coaches were positioned here between 1959 and 1964.

The branch line between Grosmont and Malton via Pickering was closed on 8 March 1965, under the Beeching Axe. It was later reopened by the North Yorkshire Moors Railway as a heritage railway on 22 April 1973, and currently operates between Grosmont and Pickering, with services also extending to Whitby.

== Passenger volume ==
Passenger Volume at Grosmont
	2010–11	2011–12	2012–13	2013–14	2014–15	2015–16	2016–17	2017–18	2018–19	2019–20	2020–21	2021–22	2022–23
Entries and exits	22,964	23,662	16,376	17,912	16,144	15,172	13,514	13,912	12,390	13,912	4,420	11,454	11,284

The statistics cover twelve month periods that start in April.

== Services ==
=== Northern Trains ===
As of the December 2025 timetable change, the station is served by six trains per day on Mondays to Saturdays and four on Sundays towards Whitby. Heading towards Middlesbrough via Nunthorpe, there are six trains per day on Mondays to Saturdays, with one continuing to Newcastle via Hartlepool, and four trains per day on Sundays, with two continuing to Darlington. All services are operated by Northern Trains.

=== North Yorkshire Moors Railway ===
The North Yorkshire Moors Railway operates heritage services between Pickering and Whitby via Grosmont. Services run daily from Easter until the end of October each year, with some additional services at other times of year.

Preceding station	National Rail	Following station
Egton	Northern Trains; Esk Valley Line	Sleights
Preceding station	Heritage railways	Following station
Goathland towards Pickering	North Yorkshire Moors Railway	Whitby Terminus
Disused railways
Beckhole	North Eastern Railway; Whitby and Pickering Railway	Terminus

== See also ==
- Listed buildings in Grosmont, North Yorkshire

== Bibliography ==
- Belcher, Henry (1976). Illustrations of the scenery on the line of the Whitby and Pickering Railway in the north eastern part of Yorkshire. East Ardsley, [Eng.]: EP Publishing. ISBN 0-7158-1164-9.
- Quick, Michael (2023). Railway Passenger Stations in Great Britain: A Chronology (PDF) (5th ed.). London: Railway and Canal Historical Society.
- Tomlinson, W. W. (1915). The North Eastern Railway; its rise and development. Andrew Reid and Company, Newcastle; Longmans, Green and Company, London.
- Vanns, Michael A. (2017). The North Yorkshire Moors Railway. Barnsley: Pen & Sword. ISBN 9781473892088.
