= Beckhole Incline =

Disused railway incline in North Yorkshire, England

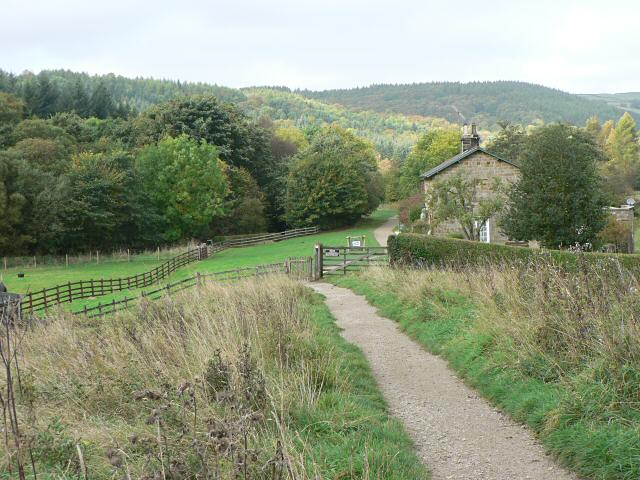
- The bottom of the incline, looking north

Overview
- Other name: Goathland Incline
- Status: Closed
- Locale: Goathland, North Yorkshire, England
- Coordinates: 54.405°N 0.728°W
- Termini: Beckhole; Goathland Bank Top

Service
- Operator(s): W&PR, 1836–1845; Y&NMR, 1845–1854; NER, 1854–1865

History
- Opened: 26 May 1836
- Closed: 1 June 1865

Technical
- Track length: 1,500 yards (1,400 m)
- Number of tracks: 1 (with passing place)
- Track gauge: 4 ft 8 1/2 in (1,435 mm) standard gauge
- Highest elevation: 350 ft (110 m)

Beckhole Incline was a steep, rope-worked gradient on the railway line between Whitby and Pickering, in the North Riding of Yorkshire, England. Opened in May 1836 as part of the horse-worked Whitby & Pickering Railway, the line was operated by three railway companies before becoming redundant on the opening of a diversionary line to the east that allowed through working by steam engines on the entire line. Although the incline was closed to regular traffic in 1865, it was used for a very brief period in 1872, to test a special locomotive intended for railways with steep gradients.

The site of the incline can now be walked, as part of the Rail Trail between Goathland and Grosmont.

== History ==
Opened as part of the Whitby and Pickering Railway (W&PR) in May 1836, the incline allowed for trains to be hauled up and down from Beckhole to Goathland Bank Top station. At Beckhole, the height above sea level was 200 feet (61 m), and at Goathland Bank Top, it was 350 feet (110 m). The incline (or inclined plane), was engineered by Frederick Swanwick to a design by George Stephenson.

The incline was 1,500 yards (1,400 m) long, and whilst it was rated at 1-in-12, it did reach 1-in-10 at one point. The first version of the incline workings involved a hemp rope attached to the wagons or carriages, and the 5.75-inch (146 mm) rope was wound around a drum 10 feet (3 m) in diameter. A tank with wheels fitted was filled with water at the top, and was then attached to one end of the rope which ran on a series of pulley wheels (174 in total). As some parts of the incline were curved, the wheels were angled and wooden rollers were added at these points to lessen friction and provide some 'give' in the rope. The tank was allowed to descend hauling the railway vehicles up the bank by its "gravitational force". The journey to the top took about 4½ minutes, (a speed of around 11 miles per hour (18 km/h)) through "an avenue of trees". At the bottom of the incline, the water tank was emptied into the beck, and it was returned to the top of the incline to be filled with water. A local farmer was employed to carry out this function, returning the tank by horse-power. If he was required to move the tank, a white flag was displayed at Beck Hole. A reservoir for supplying water for the tanks was located in Gale Field next to Goathland Bank Top. When the incline was closed, the water supply was retained for filling the water tower on Goathland station.

In the days of horse operation, apart from the opening ceremony when three carriages ascended at the same time, carriages were generally taken up the incline one at a time. On the return journey of the opening ceremony (26 May 1836), the carriages descending the incline were held near the bottom and the rope was removed. Then the brakes were released, which allowed the gravity to move the carriages to "..within 6 miles (9.7 km) of Whitby..". The company charged a flat rate for the transportation of goods along the Whitby and Pickering Railway, however, goods ascending the incline were subject to an extra Shilling per ton (1836 prices), which goods descending were not. Services were spartan in the early days with the timetable from 1844, showing just two workings in either direction. This continued right up until the conversion to full steam operation, the timetable for March 1847, still showing two trains in either direction.

The incline was listed in the Guinness Railway Book as one of the best known work-roped inclines, which were designed to carry passengers. Most inclines at that time, were used in quarrying or mining operations. Charles Dickens travelled along the incline in 1861, later writing to Wilkie Collins and describing it as a "..quaint old railway..", and its operation he described as you "did it like a Blondin".

The Whitby & Pickering Line was bought out in 1845 by the York and North Midland Railway (Y&NM), who set about adapting the entire Whitby & Pickering Line from single track to double track, (with a southern connection at Pickering to York) which it achieved in 1847. The Y&NM also implemented the conversion of the line to steam-engine operation in the same year, and the method of working the incline changed from water balancing, into a stationary steam-worked engine, with the capability of 10 brake horsepower (7.5 kW). The previous water-loading system was viewed as unreliable in the face of heavier traffic and more frequent services, with the Y&NM also considering the water tank method and communications between the railway and the farmer as "primitive". The stationary engine was located at the bank top in Goathland, and had a wire rope that was wound around a drum 6 feet (1.8 m) in diameter. The wire rope was attached to a specially-built six-wheeled van, which would be at the head of the train whilst descending, and at the rear of the train (pushing) when ascending. By 1854, the operation of the line had been subsumed into the North Eastern Railway (NER).

Initially, locomotives to be used on the line were rebuilt steam engines with different springs and wheel arrangements than in normal engines. This was in case the engines needed to visit York Works for maintenance; the route south over the incline being the only option until 1865, when the North Eastern Railway's branch from Battersby reached Grosmont station, and the deviation line opened.

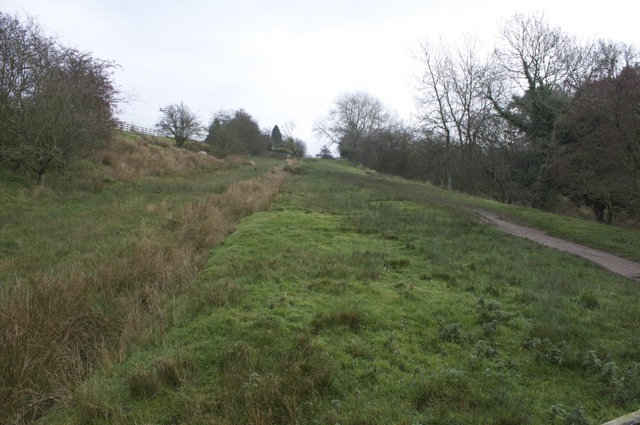
The Beck Hole Incline in Goathland

In November 1860, the North Eastern Railway submitted plans to Parliament to build a deviation railway from Grosmont to Goathland Summit. This would be a conventionally run railway with a gradient (southwards) of 1-in-49, and as such, the railway incline would be closed. The incline added 20 minutes to each journey, over what was a relative short distance, and after a series of accidents on the incline (see below section), the local and regional press stated and pushed the NER for the deviation line to be built. On 1 June 1865, the Deviation Line from Grosmont to Goathland Mill station was opened, and whilst the incline was closed, it was left in situ for some time afterwards in case it was needed. The NER issued instructions in July 1868 to remove the track and winding engine, leaving the incline derelict.

Seven years after closure, the incline was used to test an engine built by the Manning Wardle Company in Leeds, who were exporting three bespoke steam locomotives to Brazil. The engine was designed to haul a load of 40 tonnes (44 tons) up a gradient of 1-in-12. The engines were larger than the loading gauge of the railways in Yorkshire, and so bits had to be removed as it travelled across the Scarborough Viaduct in York, and other trains had to be diverted as it was an out-of-gauge working. It left Leeds on the morning of 2 May 1872, and went via Harrogate, York and then stayed overnight in Malton. It arrived at the bottom of the incline just before noon of the Friday having reversed at Grosmont, the section through Goathland having been closed and removed. The line on the incline had been relaid, and it had been adapted to be 1-in-11, 1-in-12, 1-in-13, and 1-in-14, with at least one S-curve placed on the incline. The gauge had been laid at 3 feet 8 inches (1.12 m), with a central rail raised up 9 inches (230 mm) above the main rail level. The locomotive was intended to be used on the Cantagalo Railway, transporting coffee to the ports, which was formerly carried on mules. Testing took place over two days and was deemed to be a success, and the locomotive was taken away from the incline for exporting. The raised central rail was laid sideways and this became John Barraclough Fell's patented Fell mountain railway system, used in several places worldwide, and still extant at the Snaefell Mountain Railway on the Isle of Man.

The course of the entire section of railway from Goathland Bank Top to Grosmont is now popular walking path known as the Rail Trail.

== Buildings ==
It was necessary to build several structures to effectively operate the incline. In the days of the horse-drawn operation, no written evidence exists of passengers using Beckhole as a station, although trains/carriages had to pause to detach the horse(s). By the time of steam locomotive operations, Beckhole had two workers cottages, and behind these was an engine shed with water tank. The railway fanned out into a section of five lines, one going to the shed and another having a turntable. The two cottages were later turned into one structure (Incline Cottage), which still stands and is now a private grade II listed structure.

At Goathland Bank Top, a building which is now grade II listed and referred to as The Old Ticket Office, still stands and is thought to be the building next to where water was pumped into the tank for the counterbalance operation. As engines were also needed at the top of the incline to carry on the journey, a shed was installed here also. Again, a single line structure with an adjacent turntable.

== Names ==
The most common names of the incline were Beckhole Incline, and Goathland Incline, however, Beck Holes Incline, and Beck Hole Incline were also sometimes seen. The incline was also referred to as either Whitby Incline, despite being over 8 miles (13 km) south of Whitby itself, or Gothland Incline.

== Accidents and incidents ==
- 29 July 1851 - a boy aged fifteen was knocked down by a train descending the incline. The train severed one of his legs and one of his arms. He died two hours later.
- 29 August 1860 - a passenger train travelling down the incline, did not brake sufficiently at the bottom and crashed into the engine which was waiting to couple up to the carriages and take them forward to Whitby. Three people were injured.
- 12 October 1861 - several wagons carrying whinstone were being hauled up the incline, when about 120 yards (110 m) from the summit, the rope snapped, and the wagons travelled backwards down the incline. Although the line at the bottom of the incline was supposed to have been kept free of traffic in case of runaways, some wagons had been placed there as another train was due to arrive from Whitby imminently. One of the guards, on seeing the approaching runaway wagons, removed the spragg out of the wagons (a spragg being a piece of wood placed into the axles to act as a brake), which allowed them to start moving. When the runaway wagons caught up with those just set in motion, the collision forces were lessened somewhat. However, passengers from the train arriving at Whitby, had to walk up the incline, with their luggage being taken on horse and cart along winding roads, up to the incline top.
- 25 November 1863 - two boys were crossing the line at the top of the incline, and one was crushed to death beneath a train.
- 10 February 1864 - a passenger train was in the process of being lowered down the incline, when the rope broke. The carriages left the track at the bottom of the incline where it curves to the right, killing two passengers and injuring 13. The inquiry noted how the rope was a new one installed after the last accident, and criticised the makers of the rope for having two failures. Snow contributed to the lack of braking adhesion on the incline.
- 10 June 1873 - a foreman working on the incline, was run over and both of his thighs were broken. He was taken to the Tunnel Inn at Grosmont, where he died two days later.

== See also ==
- Rosedale Railway - had an incline connecting the moor tops at Blakey to the line at Battersby.
- Scotgate Ash Quarry - had an incline from the moor down to a terminal on the railway at Pateley Bridge
