= York and North Midland Railway =

Former English railway company

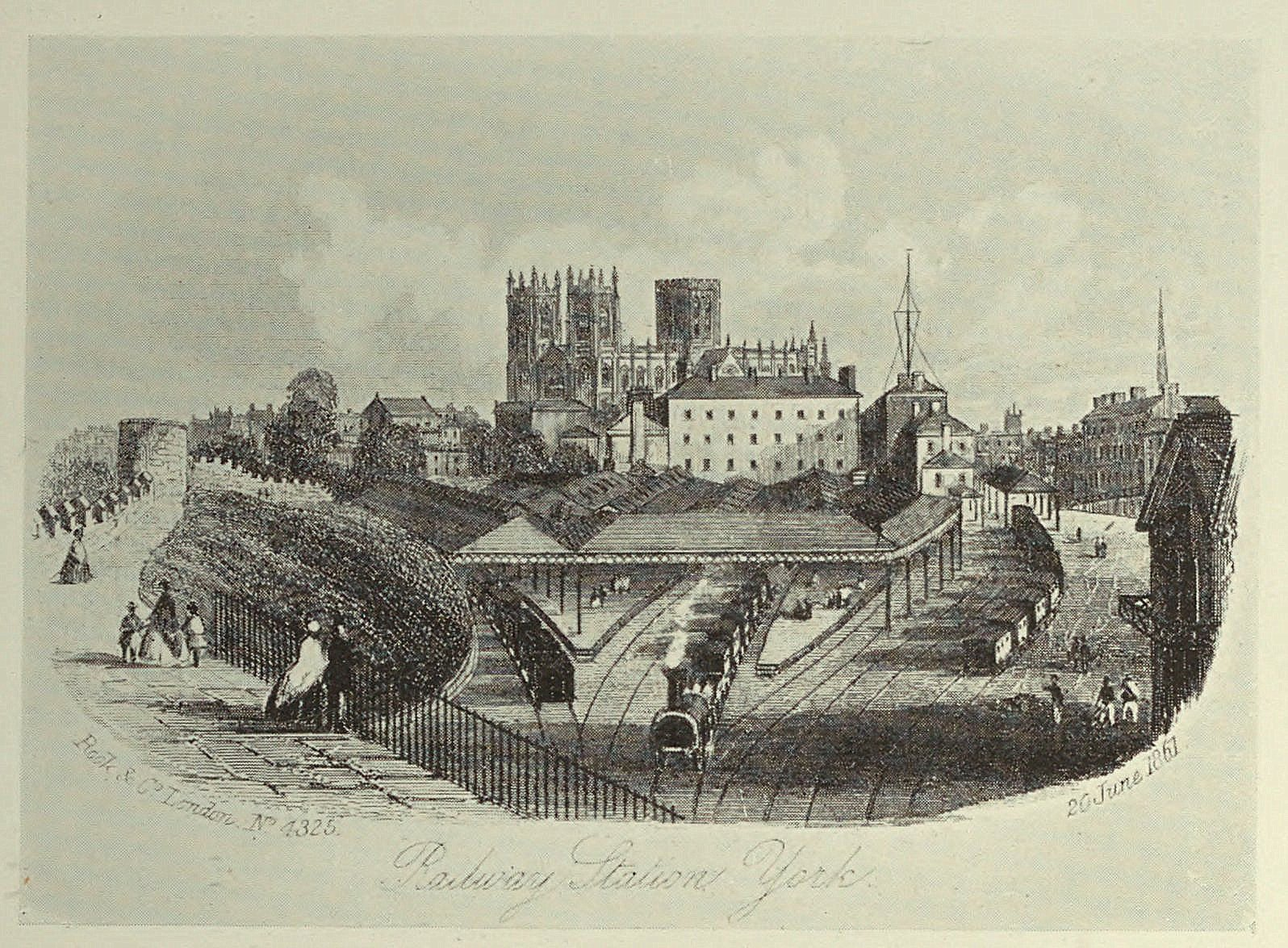
The original station at York, inside the city walls

The York and North Midland Railway (Y&NMR) was an English railway company that opened in 1839 connecting York with the Leeds and Selby Railway, and in 1840, extended this line to meet the North Midland Railway at Normanton near Leeds. Its first chairman was the railway financier George Hudson, who had been called the railway king.

The railway expanded, by building new lines or buying or leasing already built ones, to serve Hull, Scarborough, Whitby, Market Weighton, and Harrogate. In 1849 Hudson resigned as chairman as an investigation found financial irregularities in his running of the company. The results of a price war in the early 1850s led to amalgamation and on 31 July 1854 the Y&NMR merged with the Leeds Northern Railway and the York, Newcastle and Berwick Railway to form the North Eastern Railway.

== Origins ==
Having seen the success of the Liverpool and Manchester Railway and, in 1833, acts of Parliament for lines to London from Lancashire – the Grand Junction and the London and Birmingham, the manufacturers of Yorkshire realised that they would be at a commercial disadvantage.

George Hudson, who was brought up in a farming community and started life as a draper's assistant in York until in 1827, when he was 27 years old, he inherited £30,000. He had no former interest in railways, but seeing them as a profitable investment arranged a public meeting in 1833 to discuss building a line from York to Leeds. While the route was being planned, the North Midland Railway was formed in 1835 to build a line from Derby to Leeds. This would connect with the Midland Counties Railway at Derby and therefore, via the London and Birmingham Railway, provide rail access to London. Later that year at a public meeting in York, the York and North Midlands Railway was formed to build a railway line to a junction with the North Midland Railway near Normanton.

York and North Midland Railway Act 1836
- Act of Parliament
- Parliament of the United Kingdom
- Long title: An Act for making a Railway from the City of York to and into the Township of Altofts, with various Branches of Railway, all in the West Riding of the County of York or County of the said City.
- Citation: 6 & 7 Will. 4. c. lxxxi

Dates
- Royal assent: 21 June 1836

Other legislation
- Amended by: York and North Midland Railway Act 1837
- Relates to: Aire and Calder Navigation Act 1820; Aire and Calder Navigation Act 1828

Text of statute as originally enacted

York and North Midland Railway Act 1837
- Act of Parliament
- Parliament of the United Kingdom
- Long title: An Act to alter the Line of the York and North Midland Railway, and to amend the Act relating thereto.
- Citation: 7 Will. 4 & 1 Vict. c. lxviii

Dates
- Royal assent: 30 June 1837

Other legislation
- Amends: York and North Midland Railway Act 1836

York and North Midland Railway Act 1841
- Act of Parliament
- Parliament of the United Kingdom
- Long title: An Act to enable the York and North Midland Railway Company to raise a further Sum of Money; to make a certain Approach to the said Railway; and to amend the Acts relating thereto.
- Citation: 4 & 5 Vict. c. vii

Dates
- Royal assent: 6 April 1841

George Stephenson was appointed engineer for the line, a private bill was presented to Parliament seeking permission to build the railway and royal assent was given to the York and North Midland Railway Act 1836 (6 & 7 Will. 4. c. lxxxi) on 21 June 1836. The act confirmed Hudson as chairman.

The line opened the 14 1/2 miles (23.3 km) to the Leeds and Selby Railway, with a ceremony on 29 May 1839. After breakfast in York, a train with a steam locomotive at the front and back conveyed the guests in eighteen carriages to South Milford; the train then returned to a dinner in York. The line to Burton Salmon (Note: Burton Salmon railway station opened c. 1844.) was open on 11 May 1840 and the final section, with the junction at Altofts with the North Midland, opened at the end of June. After 1 July 1840, it was possible to travel to London in 14 hours by a service that left York at 7:30 am. The route taken by the line had required little in the way of earthworks, apart from a cutting at Fairburn, and gave a maximum gradient of 1 in 484 with broad curves. There were 31 bridges, the principal ones being over the Rivers Aire, Wharfe, and Calder. These were of stone, with those over the Calder and at Holdgate Lane built on the skew. The joint station with the Great North of England Railway, was within the city walls at York, and piercing of the walls was required to preserve the upper walkway; designs by G. T. Andrews and by Thomas Cabry (Y&NMR engineer) were submitted to the Yorkshire Philosophical Society who chose Andrews' tudor arches. The track was of straight sided pattern at 54 1/4 lb per yard supported either on stone blocks or kyanised wooden sleepers. The gauge was 4 ft 8 1/2 in (1,435 mm) over blocks, or 4 ft 9 in (1,448 mm) over sleepers. Locomotives were supplied by Robert Stephenson and Company and the first class carriages were lit with lamps at night, the second class were open at the sides, and in third class passengers seat on longitudinal benches without cover.

== Expansion ==
The Leeds and Hull Railroad Company had been formed in 1824 to build a railway from Leeds to the port of Hull, but had failed to raise the necessary funds. The Leeds and Selby Railway (L&SR) was formed in 1829 to build a railway as far as Selby, where goods could be conveyed onwards on barges on the Ouse and Humber to Hull. The line was to be less than 20 miles (32 km) with a maximum gradient of 1 in 135 so that horses or locomotives could be used, and the necessary permission was gained on 29 May 1830. A service started in September 1834 from a station in Leeds at Marsh Lane, just to the west of a 700-yard (640 m) tunnel through Richmond Hill, and Hull could be reached in about 4 1/2 hours. The Hull and Selby Railway (H&SR) received permission in June 1836 to complete the line to Hull, and the 30 3/4-mile (49.5 km) line, which crossed the Ouse at Selby with a bascule bridge, opened on 1 July 1840.

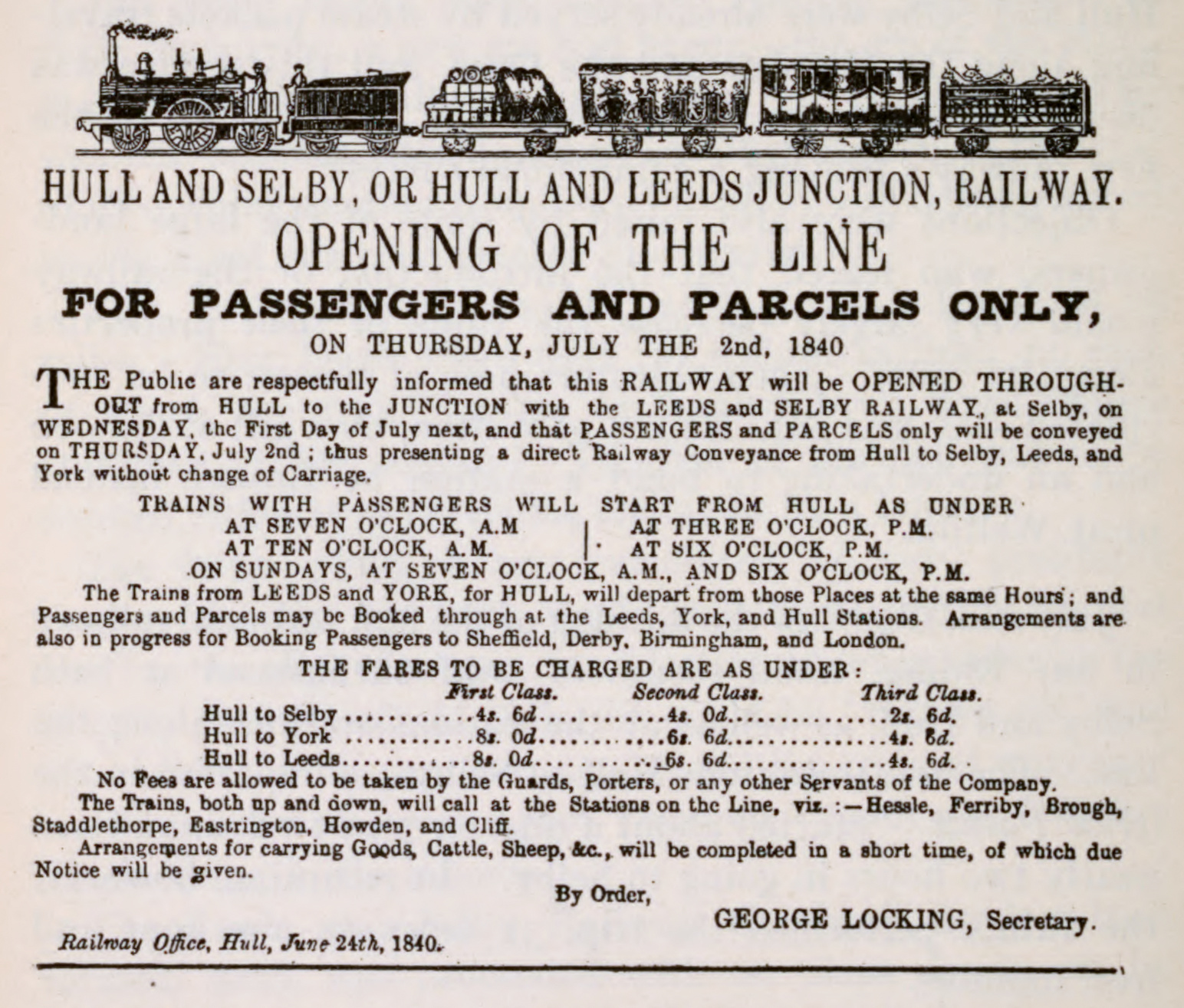
Poster advertising opening of Hull and Selby Railway

On 27 July 1840, a curve opened connecting the North Midland Railway at Methley Junction and allowing the Y&NMR direct access to Leeds, in competition with the L&SR. From 9 November Hudson leased the line for £17,000 per year; from then all traffic between Leeds and Selby was diverted via Methley and over the North Midland Railway to its Wellington station. However, the management of the Hull and Selby Railway refused any offers from Hudson to lease or operate over their line and in 1844 formed an alliance with the Manchester and Leeds Railway, which was planning a route to Selby. Amalgamation was proposed early in 1845, but at two meetings shareholders overruled the directors, accepting instead a lease from Hudson at 10% of the original capital, with an option to purchase, and the H&SR became part of the Y&NMR from 1 July 1845.

A railway to the port of Whitby was proposed in 1826, George Stephenson recommended a route to Pickering in 1832 and the Whitby and Pickering Railway Act 1833 (3 & 4 Will. 4. c. xxxv) received royal assent on 6 May 1833, which both permitted and prohibited steam locomotives. The River Esk was diverted a mile from Whitby but a number of bridges were needed, including a 312-foot (95 m) five span timber bridge at Ruswarp. A 120-yard (110 m) tunnel was dug at Grosmont and at Beck Hole a 1,500-yard (1,400 m) inclined plane was built at a gradient of 1 in 15. The line, worked by horses, opened to Grosmont on 8 June 1835 and to Pickering on 26 May 1836. At Beck Hole carriages were worked up or down the incline individually; each summer the landlord of a nearby inn erected a tent so as to supply refreshments to waiting passengers. The journey from Pickering to Whitby took an average 2 1/2 hours.

York and North Midland Railway (York and Scarborough) Act 1844
- Act of Parliament
- Parliament of the United Kingdom
- Long title: An Act for enabling the York and North Midland Railway Company to make a Railway from York to Scarborough, with a Branch to Pickering.
- Citation: 7 & 8 Vict. c. lxi

Dates
- Royal assent: 4 July 1844

The Y&NMR received permission in the York and North Midland Railway (York and Scarborough) Act 1844 (7 & 8 Vict. c. lxi) to build a line from York to Scarborough with a branch from Rillington to Pickering and to take over the Whitby and Pickering Railway. The 42-mile (68 km) line and 6 1/2-mile (10.5 km) branch were built in less than a year and opened on 7 July 1845. Following celebrations on the opening day, the railway offered free travel for the first five days. The line to Whitby was doubled, timber bridges replaced with ones built from iron and the tunnel at Grosmont rebuilt, although the incline at Beck Hole was not replaced until 1864. The first train hauled by a steam locomotive ran on 4 June 1847.

York and North Midland Railway Act 1845
- Act of Parliament
- Parliament of the United Kingdom
- Long title: An Act for enabling the York and North Midland Railway Company to alter the Line of the York and Scarborough Railway near the City of York.
- Citation: 8 & 9 Vict. c. xxxiv

Dates
- Royal assent: 30 June 1845

York and North Midland Railway (No. 2) Act 1845
- Act of Parliament
- Parliament of the United Kingdom
- Long title: An Act for enabling the York and North Midland Railway Company to make a Railway from the Line of the York and North Midland Railway to Harrogate.
- Citation: 8 & 9 Vict. c. lxxxiv

Dates
- Royal assent: 21 July 1845

York and North Midland Railway (Bridlington Branch) Act 1845
- Act of Parliament
- Parliament of the United Kingdom
- Long title: An Act for enabling the York and North Midland Railway Company to make a Branch Railway from the Line of the York and Scarborough Railway, in the Township of Seamer, to Bridlington.
- Citation: 8 & 9 Vict. c. lviii

Dates
- Royal assent: 30 June 1845

York and North Midland Railway (Whitby and Pickering Extension) Act 1846
- Act of Parliament
- Parliament of the United Kingdom
- Long title: An Act for enabling the York and North Midland Railway Company to extend the Line of the Whitby and Pickering Railway to or near Castleton.
- Citation: 9 & 10 Vict. c. lix

Dates
- Royal assent: 18 June 1846

York and North Midland Railway (East Riding Branches) (No. 1) Act 1846
- Act of Parliament
- Parliament of the United Kingdom
- Long title: An Act for enabling the York and North Midland Railway Company to make certain Branch Railways in the East Riding of the County of York; and for other Purposes.
- Citation: 9 & 10 Vict. c. lxv

Dates
- Royal assent: 18 June 1846

York and North Midland Railway (East Riding Branches) (No. 2) Act 1846
- Act of Parliament
- Parliament of the United Kingdom
- Long title: An Act for enabling the York and North Midland Railway Company to make certain Branch Railways in the East Riding of the County of York; and for other Purposes.
- Citation: 9 & 10 Vict. c. lxvi

Dates
- Royal assent: 18 June 1846

York and North Midland Railway (Widening and Enlargement) Act 1846
- Act of Parliament
- Parliament of the United Kingdom
- Long title: An Act to authorize the widening and Enlargement of Part of the Line of the York and North Midland Railway, or the Construction and Maintenance of a Railway adjoining thereto.
- Citation: 9 & 10 Vict. c. ccxlvii

Dates
- Royal assent: 27 July 1846

The Y&NMR received permission in the York and North Midland Railway (No. 2) Act 1845 (8 & 9 Vict. c. lxxxiv) for a line to Harrogate and it opened to Spofforth on 10 August 1847. After completing the 825-yard (754 m) long Prospect Hill tunnel and 1,873-foot (571 m) long Crimple Viaduct, on 20 July 1848 services started to the centrally sited Brunswick station. The Leeds and Thirsk Railway (later the Leeds Northern Railway) passed under the viaduct and opened its station at Starbeck in September that year. The Leeds and Thirsk Railway was able to offer a shorter journey to Leeds after it had opened to Leeds in July 1849, although the Y&NMR station at Brunswick was more convenient. Both the Y&NMR and Hull and Selby Railway had permission for a line to Bridlington, the Y&NMR in the York and North Midland Railway (Bridlington Branch) Act 1845 (8 & 9 Vict. c. lviii) for a branch from Seamer, on the York to Scarborough Line; and the Hull and Selby Railway, a branch from Hull. The line was built and opened on 6 October 1846 as the Hull and Scarborough branch. The York and North Midland Railway (East Riding Branches) (No. 2) Act 1846 (9 & 10 Vict. c. lxvi), giving approval for two lines to Market Weighton was granted to the York and North Midland Railway on 18 June 1846. A double line York to Beverley Line was opened to Market Weighton on 4 October 1847, and a single line from Selby to Market Weighton opened on 1 August 1848.

York and North Midland Railway (Knottingley Branch) Act 1847
- Act of Parliament
- Parliament of the United Kingdom
- Long title: An Act for enabling the York and North Midland Railway Company to make a Railway from their Line at Burton Salmon to Knottingley, with a Branch therefrom; and for other Purposes.
- Citation: 10 & 11 Vict. c. cxli

Dates
- Royal assent: 9 July 1847

Text of statute as originally enacted

York and North Midland Railway (Canals Purchase) Act 1847
- Act of Parliament
- Parliament of the United Kingdom
- Long title: An Act to authorize the Purchase by the York and North Midland Railway Company of the Interests of the Shareholders in the Market Weighton Canal, and the Purchase of the Canal communicating therewith called Sir Edward Vavasour's Canal, of the Pocklington Canal, and of the Leven Canal, all in the East Riding of the County of York.
- Citation: 10 & 11 Vict. c. ccxvi
- Territorial extent: United Kingdom

Dates
- Royal assent: 22 July 1847

Other legislation
- Relates to: Market Weighton Act 1772

Text of statute as originally enacted

York and North Midland Railway (Boroughbridge and Knaresborough Extension) Act 1847
- Act of Parliament
- Parliament of the United Kingdom
- Long title: An Act for enabling the York and North Midland Railway Company to make a Railway from their Church Fenton and Harrogate Branch to Knaresborough and Boroughbridge.
- Citation: 10 & 11 Vict. c. ccxix

Dates
- Royal assent: 22 July 1847

Text of statute as originally enacted

York and North Midland Railway Act 1849
- Act of Parliament
- Parliament of the United Kingdom
- Long title: An Act for enabling the York and North Midland Railway Company to divert their Railways between Market Weighton and Beverley and Copmanthorpe and Tadcaster, all in the County of York; and for other Purposes.
- Citation: 12 & 13 Vict. c. lx

Dates
- Royal assent: 13 July 1849

Text of statute as originally enacted

York and North Midland Railway Act 1850
- Act of Parliament
- Parliament of the United Kingdom
- Long title: An Act to alter the Terms of Issue of the Shares in the Capital of the York and North Midland Railway Company, called the "Hull and Selby Purchase, &c. Shares;" to enable the said Company to hold Shares in the Hull and Selby Railway Company and in the Malton and Driffield Junction Railway Company; to alter, amend, and extend the Acts relating to the York and North Midland Railway Company; and for other Purposes.
- Citation: 13 & 14 Vict. c. xxxviii

Dates
- Royal assent: 15 July 1850

Text of statute as originally enacted

York and North Midland Railway Act 1853
- Act of Parliament
- Parliament of the United Kingdom
- Long title: An Act to authorize the Re-issue of certain of the Shares in the Capital of the York and North Midland Railway Company, called Hull and Selby Purchase, &c. Shares, and for other Purposes.
- Citation: 16 & 17 Vict. c. cix

Dates
- Royal assent: 4 August 1853

Text of statute as originally enacted

== George Hudson departs ==
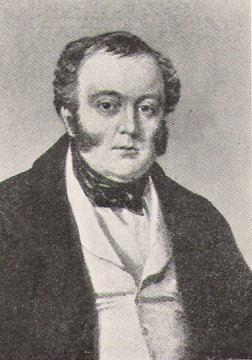
George Hudson

During the railway mania of the mid-1840s, many people invested in railway companies, believing it a means of quickly getting rich. In the three years between 1844 and 1846, Parliament passed 438 acts giving permission for over 8,000 miles (13,000 km) of line, many in direct competition with existing railways. By the mid-1840s, Hudson was also chairman of the Midland Railway, (Note: The Midland Railway had been formed in 1844 by the amalgamation of the North Midland Railway, Midland Counties Railway and Birmingham and Derby Junction Railway.) Newcastle and Berwick Railway and Newcastle and Darlington Junction Railway. Called the "railway king" by the preacher Sydney Smith, he was said to have the favour of Albert, the Prince Consort. So as to better promote the bills submitted by the railway companies he controlled, in 1845 Hudson successfully stood as a Conservative Member of Parliament for Sunderland. In 1848 the Great Northern Railway (GNR) had a line to Askern and the Y&NMR had authority for a branch from Burton Salmon to Knottingley, about 9 miles (14 km) to the north. Hudson and Edmund Denison, the chairman of the GNR, met at the end of 1848 and agreed terms for the GNR to access York via Knottingley, the GNR dropping plans for its own line to York via Selby. As this plan diverted traffic between York and London away from the London and North Western and Midland railways, these two railways formed an alliance, attempting to divert whatever traffic they could via Leeds and handing it over to the York, Newcastle and Berwick Railway (YN&BR) at Thirsk. In response the YN&BR and Y&NMR co-operated to lower prices to keep the traffic flowing via York.

At the end of 1848 the dividend paid by the Y&NMR dropped from ten per cent to six per cent and at a subsequent half-yearly YN&BR shareholders meeting the very high cost of certain Great North shares bought during the merger was questioned. After Hudson admitted the company had purchased them from him, an investigating committee was set up and Hudson resigned as chairman in May 1849. The committee reported on a number of irregularities in the account such as inflating traffic figures and finding capital items that had been charged to the revenue account, thus paying dividends out of capital. No dividend was paid for the first half year of 1849, and Hudson was to pay £212,000 settling claims over share transactions.

The building of new branches was severely restricted in the years following Hudson's departure. Work was halted on a direct line between York and Leeds, the York and North Midland Railway (Leeds Extension) branch, although a stone viaduct had been built across the River Wharfe at Tadcaster (see Tadcaster Viaduct), and an extension of the line from York to Market Weighton onto Beverley was suspended. However, the independent East and West Yorkshire Junction Railway had been authorised on 16 July 1846 to build a railway from the main line just outside York to Knaresborough. When it opened to a temporary station at Hay Park Lane on 30 October 1848, the line was worked by the York, Newcastle and Berwick Railway, but after 1849 this was switched to E. B. Wilson and Company, who was paid per mile plus a percentage of revenue. The railway was taken over by the York and North Midland Railway on 1 July 1851.

== Locomotives ==
Name	Wheels	Builder	Date introduced	Y&NMR no.	NER no.	Comments
Antelope	2-2-2	Shepherd and Todd	1841	?	253	
Ariel	2-2-2	Shepherd and Todd	1841	?	254	
Duncombe	2-2-2	Robert Stephenson and Company	1841/42	23	257	
Rocket	2-2-2	Robert Stephenson and Company	1841/42	25	258	
	2-2-2	Robert Stephenson and Company	1841/42	26	259	
Princess	2-2-2	Robert Stephenson and Company	1841/42	27	260	
Prince of Wales	2-2-2	Robert Stephenson and Company	1841/42	28	261	
	2-2-2	Robert Stephenson and Company	1841/42	30	263	
	2-2-2	E. B. Wilson and Company	1847/48	88	319	
	2-2-2	E. B. Wilson and Company	1847/48	89	320	
	2-2-2	E. B. Wilson and Company	1847/48	90	321	
	2-2-2	E. B. Wilson and Company	1847/48	91	322	
	2-2-2	E. B. Wilson and Company	1847/48	92	323	
	2-2-2	E. B. Wilson and Company	1847/48	93	324	
	2-2-2	E. B. Wilson and Company	1847/48	94	325	
	2-2-2	E. B. Wilson and Company	1847/48	95	326	
	2-2-2	E. B. Wilson and Company	1847/48	102	333	
	2-2-2	E. B. Wilson and Company	1847/48	103	334	
	2-2-2	E. B. Wilson and Company	1847/48	113	344	

For locomotives taken over from the Hull and Selby Railway see Hull and Selby Railway.

Notes

1. Y&NMR = York and North Midland Railway
2. NER = North Eastern Railway

== Accidents and incidents ==
- On 11 November 1840, a luggage train was in a rear-end collision with a passenger train at Taylor's Junction, Yorkshire. Two people were killed. The line was being worked under time interval working.
- In 1850, the boiler of a locomotive exploded whilst it was hauling a freight train at Staddlethorpe station, Yorkshire, derailing the locomotive.
- On 1 March 1915, at 3.45 pm, Head shunter Albert Cox was stationed at Normanton Railway station, West Yorkshire. Whilst waiting for a wagon to arrive, Cox decided to cross the line but was knocked down by a wagon resulting in fatal injuries.

== North Eastern Railway ==
In 1852, the Leeds Northern Railway (LNR) reached Stockton, made an alliance with the York, Newcastle and Berwick Railway's competitors and a price war broke out, the fare for 238 miles (383 km) between Leeds and Newcastle dropping to two shillings. (Note: Two shillings in 1852 was worth about the same as £12.07 today.) T. E. Harrison, who had become General Manager and Engineer of the York, Newcastle and Berwick Railway, looked at merger with LNR and Y&NMR as the answer. Negotiations started first with his own board, where he was able to show the increased profit that amalgamation had brought to the York, Newcastle and Berwick Railway. With a proposal that the shares of the three companies remain separate, replaced by Berwick Capital Stock, York Capital Stock and Leeds Capital Stock, and dividends paid from pooled revenue, the agreement of the three boards was reached in November 1852. The deal was rejected by the shareholders of the Leeds Northern, who felt their seven per cent share of revenue too low; joint operation was agreed instead of a full merger and Harrison appointed general manager. The benefits of this joint working allowed Harrison to raise the offer to the Leeds Northern Railway shareholders and by royal assent to the North-eastern Railway Company's Act 1854 (17 & 18 Vict. c. ccxi) on 31 July 1854 the three companies merged to form the North Eastern Railway; with 703 route miles (1,131 km) of line, becoming the largest railway company in the country.

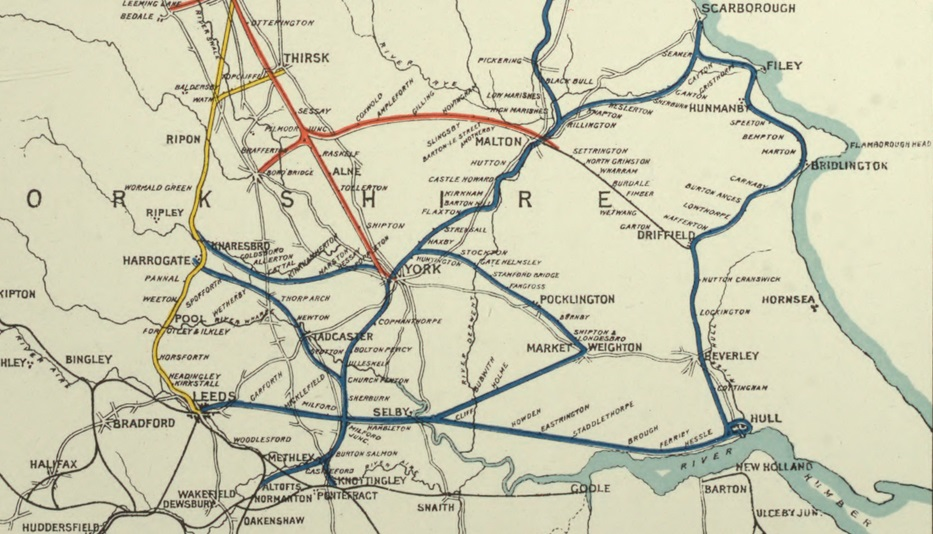
The Y&NMR is shown in blue on this map of 1854; the line heading north from Pickering is to Whitby.

North Eastern Railway (Harrogate Branches) Act 1859
- Act of Parliament
- Parliament of the United Kingdom
- Long title: An Act to enable the North-eastern Railway Company to construct Branch Railways for the Purpose of uniting their Leeds and Thirsk and Church Fenton and Harrowgate Railways, and for other Purposes.
- Citation: 22 & 23 Vict. c. c

Dates
- Royal assent: 8 August 1859

The former Leeds Northern and York and North Midland lines in Harrogate were connected, the permission being given by the North Eastern Railway (Harrogate Branches) Act 1859 (22 & 23 Vict. c. c) on 8 August 1859. The station at Brunswick was replaced by the current Harrogate railway station on a new line that branched from the Y&NMR line in town to the former Leeds Northern line north of Starbeck. Another new line, connecting from north of Pannal station to end of Crimple Viaduct, gave the former Leeds Northern line access to this station.

In 1863, the North Eastern Railway applied for permission for a line from Church Fenton (Note: Church Fenton railway station had opened in 1847.) to Micklefield and a new station near the Midland Railway at Leeds. This was given in the North Eastern Railway (Micklefield Branch) Act 1864 (27 & 28 Vict. c. xx) and these opened on 1 April 1869, and a through passenger service ran on a section of former Leeds and Selby line for the first time since Hudson had diverted the York to Leeds trains in 1840. In 1864 the NER applied for permission for a new line south from York to Doncaster via Selby. Royal assent to the North Eastern Railway (York and Doncaster Branch) Act 1864 (27 & 28 Vict. c. xlix) was given that year, and modifications were given permission the following year. On 2 January 1871, East Coast trains joined the NER at was to become Shaftholme Junction, travelled via Selby, and then rejoined the old line 2 miles (3.2 km) south of York. The old station at York was replaced by a through station outside the city walls in 1877. The York to Market Weighton line was extended to Hull via Beverley, opening on 1 May 1865.

The line from Selby through Market Weighton to Driffield was completed when the Scarborough, Bridlington and West Riding Junction Railway was given permission to build a railway from Market Weighton to Driffield by the Scarborough, Bridlington and West Riding Junction Railways Act 1885 (48 & 49 Vict. c. clxxxi) on 6 August 1885. From 18 April 1890 the NER provided freight services and from 1 May 1890 also carried passengers; the NER took over the line in 1913. The NER inherited the perpetual lease on the Hull and Selby Railway, purchasing it on 1 March 1872.

As a result of the Railways Act 1921, on 1 January 1923 the North Eastern Railway became part of the London and North Eastern Railway (LNER). Britain's railways were nationalised on 1 January 1948 and the former York and North Midland lines were placed under the control of British Railways.

== Legacy ==
The different routes of the East Coast Main Line between Doncaster and York since the original route via Knottingley opened in 1850.

The 1840 York and North Midland line is open from York to Burton Salmon and Ferrybridge, services bypassing Knottingley on their way to Pontefract Baghill. The line between Milford Junction and Altofts Junction is used by freight services only. The former Leeds and Selby and Selby and Hull lines are open and used by trains from Hull to Leeds and York.

In 1963, Dr Beeching published his report "The Reshaping of British Railways", which recommended closing the network's least used stations and lines. This listed the former Y&NMR lines from Church Fenton to Harrogate and the former Whitby and Pickering Railway. The two lines through Market Weighton were listed for closure, both having been extended by the NER, the line from York to Hull via Beverley the one from Selby to Driffield.

The former Y&NMR line between Church Fenton and Harrogate closed to passengers on 6 January 1964. Today's Harrogate Line follows the former Leeds and Thirsk line from Leeds to join the former Y&NMR line over the Crimple Viaduct. Services pass over the link between the 1882 Harrogate station and Starbeck station before taking the branch to Knaresborough and the E&WJR to York. The York to Scarborough line and the coast line from Hull to Seamer remain open. The branch to Whitby closed to Grosmont in 1965, the line through the Esk Valley to Middlesbrough remaining open. The line from Grosmont to Pickering has since reopened as part of the heritage North Yorkshire Moors Railway.

The lines through Market Weighton closed in 1965, the line between York and Beverley on 29 November.

In January 2019, the Campaign for Better Transport released a report identifying the line between Pickering and Malton which was listed as Priority 2 for reopening. Priority 2 is for those lines which require further development or a change in circumstances (such as housing developments).

== Notes and references ==
=== Sources ===
- Allen, Cecil J. (1974) [1964]. The North Eastern Railway. Ian Allan. ISBN 0-7110-0495-1.
- Awdry, Christopher (1990). Encyclopaedia of British Railway Companies. Patrick Stephens. ISBN 1-85260-049-7.
- Beeching, Richard (1963a). "The Reshaping of British Railways" (PDF). HMSO. See also Beeching, Richard (1963b). "The Reshaping of British Railways (maps)" (PDF). HMSO. map 9.
- Cobb, Colonel M.H. (2006). The Railways of Great Britain: A Historical Atlas. Ian Allan. ISBN 978-07110-3236-1.
- Hall, Stanley (1990). The Railway Detectives. London: Ian Allan. ISBN 0-7110-1929-0.
- Hewison, Christian H. (1983). Locomotive Boiler Explosions. Newton Abbot: David & Charles. ISBN 0-7153-8305-1.
- Hedges, Martin, ed. (1981). 150 years of British Railways. Hamyln. ISBN 0-600-37655-9.
- Hoole, K. (1974). A Regional History of the Railways of Great Britain: Volume IV The North East. David & Charles. ISBN 0715364391.
- Jowett, Alan (1989). Jowett's Railway Atlas of Great Britain & Ireland. Patrick Stephens. ISBN 1-85260-086-1.
- Tomlinson, William Weaver (1915). The North Eastern Railway: Its rise and development. Andrew Reid and Company.
- Whishaw, Francis (1842). The Railways of Great Britain and Ireland Practically Described and Illustrated (2nd ed.). London: John Weale. OCLC 833076248.
- Route Specifications – London North Eastern. Network Rail. 2012.
