= Whitby and Pickering Railway =

Railway company and line in North Yorkshire, England

- Founded: 1832
- Defunct: 1845
- Fate: Acquired by York and North Midland Railway

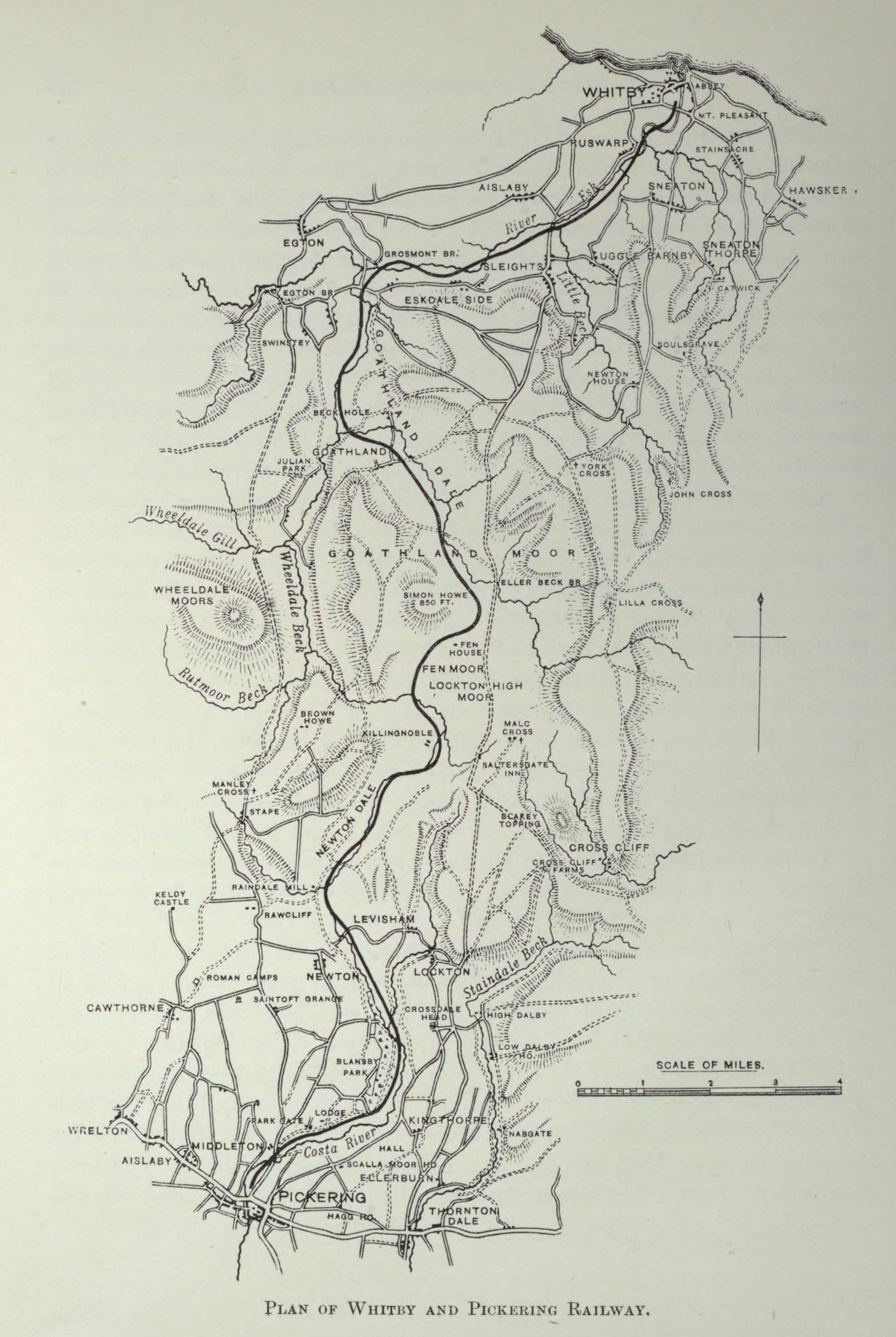
Route of the line.

The Whitby and Pickering Railway (W&P) was built to halt the gradual decline of the port of Whitby on the east coast of England. Its basic industries—whaling and shipbuilding—had been in decline and it was believed that opening transport links inland would help regenerate the town and port.

Until the turnpike to Pickering was opened in 1759, Whitby was better connected to the rest of the country by sea than by land; even then the difficult climb over the high moors was an obstacle. Stagecoach services did not start until 1795 and mail coaches (three a week) until 1823.

The Whitby and Pickering Railway opened in stages in 1836 (being one of the earliest railways in Yorkshire) and was worked by horses until it was absorbed into the York and North Midland Railway in 1845 and was converted into a conventional double tracked steam-worked railway.

== History ==
=== The W&P, a horse drawn railway ===
Whitby and Pickering Railway Act 1833
- Act of Parliament
- Parliament of the United Kingdom
- Long title: An Act for making a Railway from Whitby to Pickering in the North Riding of the County of York.
- Citation: 3 & 4 Will. 4. c. xxxv

Dates
- Royal assent: 6 May 1833

Text of statute as originally enacted

In 1793 it was proposed to construct a canal from Whitby to Pickering along much the same course as the later railway. After the success of the Stockton and Darlington Railway, which had a number of Whitby backers, attention switched to the possibility of a railway from Whitby to either Stockton or Pickering. Many pamphlets were issued for or against the various proposals; copies of some can be found in the library of the Whitby Literary and Philosophical Society. In 1832 George Stephenson was asked to report on the rival routes. Stephenson's report favoured a horse-worked railway to Pickering and his conclusion was accepted at a meeting in Whitby on 14 September 1832. The Whitby and Pickering Railway Act 1833 (3 & 4 Will. 4. c. xxxv) received royal assent on 6 May 1833.

The directors of the Whitby and Pickering Railway Company mainly came from Whitby or the immediate area and represented a cross section of the business community, including bankers, solicitors, shipbuilders and ship owners. The shareholders came from a wider area, some from London but those from the immediate area predominated.

==== Construction and engineering ====
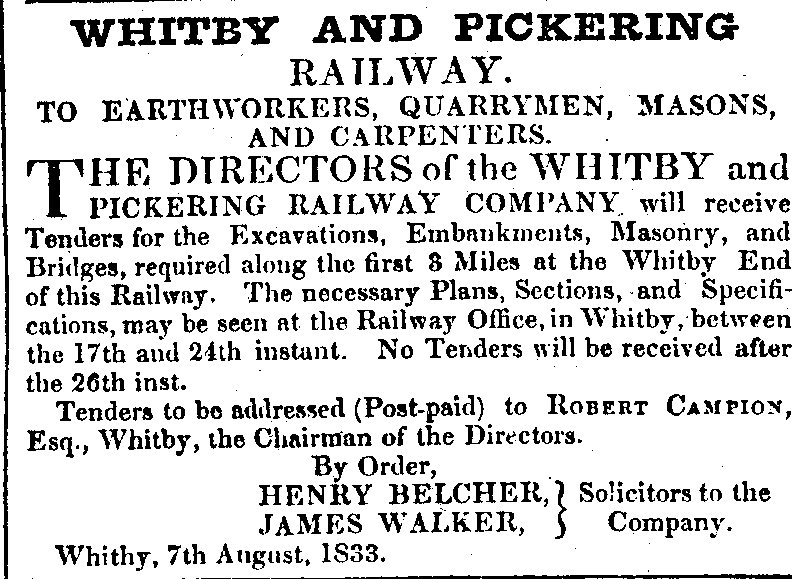
The 'Invitation to Tender' for constructing the first 3 mi (5 km) of the railway.

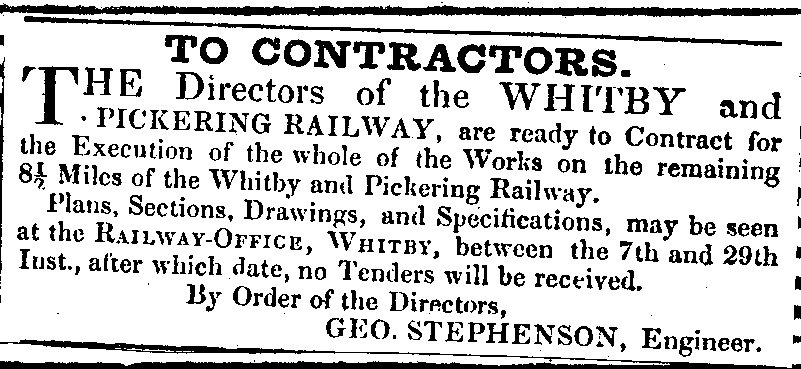
The 'Invitation to Tender' for constructing the final 8 1/2 mi (14 km) of the railway.

The W&P directors invited the first tenders for the construction of 3 miles (5 km) at the Whitby end of the railway by August 1833 and in October 1834 tenders for the final 8 1/2 miles (14 km) (the 'central division' of the railway) were invited. The tender was awarded to Hamer and Pratt, who had just finished work on the Leeds and Selby Railway.

There was an intention to link the W&P to York and beyond; a meeting held in York in September 1834 to further the proposed railway from York to Leeds was attended by a W&P delegation accompanied by engineer, George Stephenson, to lobby for a link to Pickering. The meeting may have been the first meeting of George Stephenson and George Hudson and bore fruit even though the York to Leeds Line was not built for some years.

The Whitby and Pickering Railway (W&P), was one of the first railways in Yorkshire, when it opened in 1836 as a single track horse worked railway. Its total length was 24 miles (39 km).

George Stephenson planned to ascend from the valley of the Murk Esk at Beckhole to the high moors at Goathland by means of a 1,500-yard-long (1,400 m) rope-worked incline at an average gradient of 1 in 15 (66.7‰).

The method of working was that of a self‑acting incline common in mines, but here, differing from the case of a mine, the load was equal each way, and so there was attached to each train a water‑tank; this was filled with water at the top of the incline, and its preponderating weight as it descended pulled the other train up the hill; arrived at the bottom, the water‑tank was emptied and was sent up with the next train.

He would cross Fen Bog, near the summit of the line, using the same method, hurdles and fascines, he had previously used to cross Chat Moss on the Liverpool and Manchester Railway.

The track consisted of wrought iron fish-bellied rails in 15-foot (5 m) lengths with five 'bellies' to each length, at 40 pounds per yard (20 kg/m). Cast iron chairs supported the rail between each 'belly', special double chairs supported the joints between lengths of rail. The chairs were fastened to locally quarried stone blocks using iron pins. A length of original track is displayed at Pickering Station.

Stephenson in fact acted mainly in an advisory capacity, having delegated the work to his chief engineer Frederick Swanwick.

The W&P obtained materials by tender and suppliers were from many parts of the country; the rails, chairs and pins (which were in short supply partly due to heavy demand) were obtained from well-known suppliers including Bradley & Foster's Stourbridge Ironworks, the Capponfield Ironworks near Birmingham, the Nantyglo Ironworks, Monmouthshire and the Bedlington Ironworks in Northumberland. Supplies largely travelled by water. The surviving W&P minute books in the National Archives show that supplies from the Midlands travelled by narrow boat to Gainsborough, where they were transshipped to coasters for forwarding to Whitby; others travelled by boat to Malton on the Derwent Navigation and were forwarded to Pickering by ox-cart.

The total cost of the line was £80,000, but with extra land purchased for probable enlargements, the cost was about £105,000, or £4,400 per mile. As one commentator put it "This is a good example of careful and conscientious work, no unnecessary expenditure, but a railway suited to the needs of the time, constructed at the smallest possible cost."

==== Operations and traffic ====
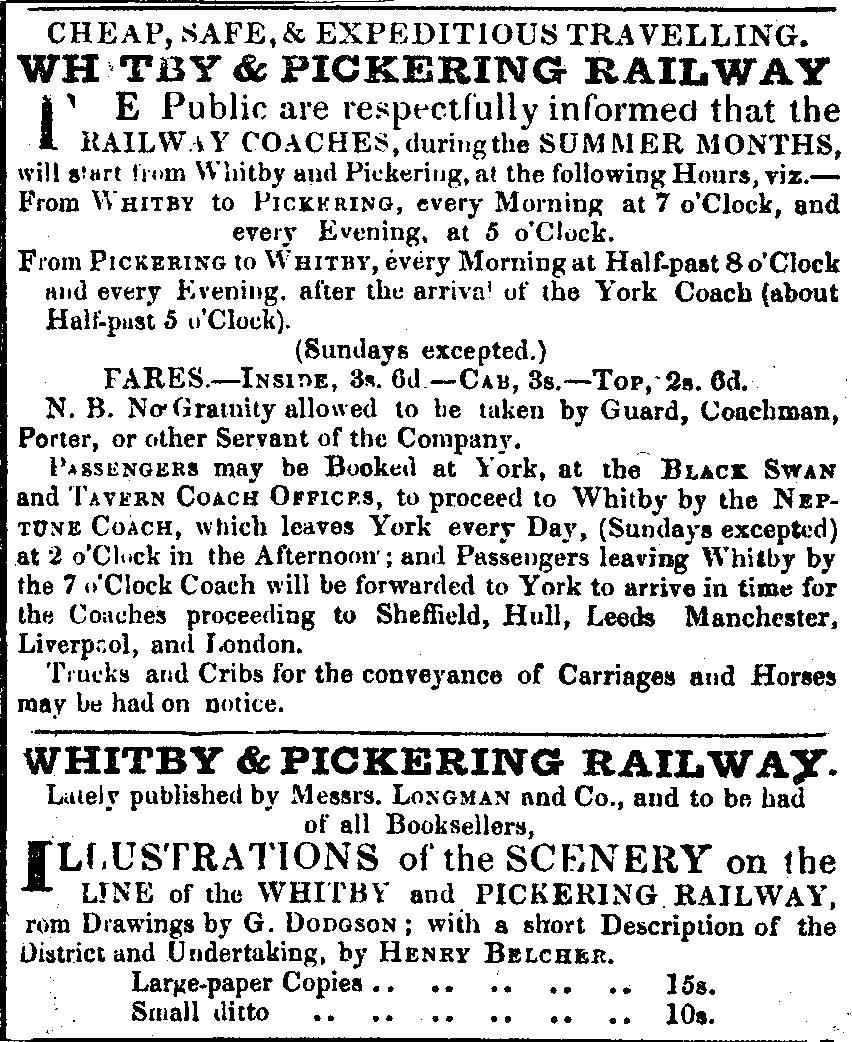
The details of early Whitby and Pickering Railway services, together with an advertisement for Belcher's book on the W&P.

Although the W&P had been promoted to carry coal, stone, timber and limestone, it was intended to carry passengers from the start and three coaches were obtained (the first, from Beeston & Melling of Manchester) which were basically stage coaches adapted for use on a railway and a number of cheaper open market coaches were obtained, probably locally. The first class coaches were named Premier, Transit and Lady Hilda.

The W&P was never a well-off company and the directors were anxious to carry passengers and goods at the earliest opportunity and on Monday 8 June 1835 the line between Whitby and the Tunnel Inn (now Grosmont) was opened, and its first class coach, Premier left Whitby at 2 pm, returning about 8 pm. The company subsequently ran two return journeys per day except on Sundays.

In July 1835, for Ruswarp Fair the company provided a special coach that ran sixteen trips during the day between Whitby and Ruswarp which proved very popular, with some passengers travelling repeatedly because of the novelty.

The W&P bridge and horse tunnel at Grosmont. Dodgson, c. 1836. (Note: From an illustration in Illustrations of the scenery on the line of the Whitby and Pickering Railway... (Belcher & Dodgson 1836), Belcher was a local solicitor and promoter and director of the W&PR, the engravings were by George Dodgson.)

When the whole line opened on 26 May 1836, the W&P operated a regular passenger service which connected at Pickering with the stagecoach to York and the rest of the developing railway network. There is a recorded instance of a ship from the Baltic docking at Whitby and its captain finding orders awaiting him to proceed to Liverpool. He took the W&P coach to Pickering connecting to York where he boarded a train for Manchester (connecting by coach over the incomplete part of the Leeds and Manchester Railway) and completed his journey to Liverpool by train – the whole journey only took hours, whereas it could have taken many days only a few years earlier.

Whilst the introduction of railways (steam or horse powered) generally spelt the end of coach services on directly competing routes, it provided opportunities for feeder coach services as shown on the advertisement for 'The Queen' coach put on between Scarborough, Pickering and Helmsley only two months after the W&P opened.

=== The Y&NM, the introduction of steam power ===
Whitby and Pickering Railway Act 1845
- Act of Parliament
- Parliament of the United Kingdom
- Long title: An Act for authorizing the Sale of the Whitby and Pickering Railway to the York and North Midland Railway Company, and for enabling the said Company to make certain Deviations or Alterations in the Line of the Whitby and Pickering Railway.
- Citation: 8 & 9 Vict. c. lvii

Dates
- Royal assent: 30 June 1845

When the W&P was absorbed into the York and North Midland Railway by the Whitby and Pickering Railway Act 1845 (8 & 9 Vict. c. lvii) and into George Hudson's growing empire, the railway was rebuilt as a double track steam-worked railway and connected to the Y&NM's York to Scarborough Line being built at Rillington junction. Through rail journeys became possible from Whitby to the industrial districts of the West Riding, Hull, Manchester, Liverpool, London and other destinations. Whitby became accessible to day-trippers and holidaymakers. To encourage traffic George Hudson formed a company to develop the West Cliff in Whitby, building roads and hotels before work stopped at Hudson's downfall in 1849.

With a connected national rail network the Royal Mail used the railways to carry mail. The first train from York to Whitby each morning was the mail train, a train that continued running for the best part of one hundred and twenty years.

The conversion of the line from horse to steam power took place in stages; the first steam train service between Pickering and Levisham started on 1 September 1846 using a single track. By the following year a second track had been laid and was passed for use by Her Majesty's Railway Inspector Captain J. W. Coddington, RE in a report dated 8 June 1847 following an inspection three days earlier. The same report did not approve opening the line between Levisham and the 'top of the Incline' at Goathland as 'over this portion the rails were ill adjusted, the sleepers irregular, the ballasting incomplete & some pairs of Contractors joints & shifting Rails remaining'. Approval was given for opening the line from the bottom of the Incline to Whitby but allowed the use of only a single engine.

A further report dated 30 June 1847 following a second inspection the previous day, found a much improved state of affairs, one track was complete and the second within a day of completion. Captain Coddington summed up that 'I am of opinion that the line may be opened with safety on the 1st Inst according to the wish of the Company'. It is clear from Capt. Coddington's reports that the horse-drawn coaches continued to run until replaced by steam trains.

The wooden sleepers required for rebuilding the line appear to have been imported from the Baltic to Whitby, details of several shiploads of sleepers are held in the National Archives.

Following the discovery of apparent financial irregularities by George Hudson, the Y&NM appointed a committee of investigation whose four printed reports includes severe criticism of the purchase and conversion of the W&P:

Your Committee have no precise information with respect to the manner in which this purchase was brought about, but it would seem that the proposal came in the first instance from the directors of the Whitby & Pickering Company. The powers to make the branch line from the Scarbro’ Railway to connect it with the Whitby & Pickering Railway at Pickering, were included in the Bill for the Scarborough Line, and in January 1844, a Special Meeting of the Shareholders of the Whitby & Pickering Railway was held to give their formal assent to the proposed terminus of this company’s line at Pickering. At that meeting, the directors informed the shareholders that they had been in communication with Mr.Hudson for the sale of the line to the York & North Midland Railway Company and requested their authority to continue the negotiation, which was given.

The original cost of the railway was £135,000, but at the time of the negotiation it was scarcely paying the expenses of working it; £30,000 was the extreme market value of the entire concern, so that the prospective increased value must have been estimated at £50,000. The line itself, it will be seen, does not pay the interest on the purchase money alone, and the enormous outlay in converting it from a Horse to an Engine line is entirely unproductive.

Your Committee cannot sufficiently condemn this most improvident bargain, and the unjustified extravagance in the subsequent outlay.

Elsewhere in the reports the Committee of Investigation summarise the costs (to date) for the Whitby branch:

To purchase of Whitby & Pickering (horse) Railway, 23 1/2 miles (£80,000) and reconstruct it for locomotives. Authorized share and loan capital £180,000. Estimated expenditure to 30th June 1849: £468,000.

They also summarise the operating income and expenditure (in an extract from details covering the whole Y&NM):

Total traffic for year 1848
Whitby & Pickering £11,323
Working charges including depreciation, duty & rates £8,172
Net Receipts £3,151

The York and North Midland Railway was one of three railways that formed the North Eastern Railway in 1854. In 1923 the North Eastern Railway was absorbed into the London and North Eastern Railway as part of the grouping of the railways following the First World War. In 1948 all the major railway companies in Great Britain were nationalised forming British Railways.

=== Closure and rebirth ===
The line from Rillington Junction to Whitby closed as a result of the Beeching Report along with most of Whitby's railway links. The Esk Valley Line was reprieved saving six miles (10 km) of the original W&P between Whitby and Grosmont.

In 1967 the North Yorkshire Moors Railway Preservation Society (NYMRPS) was formed with the aim of preserving the line between Grosmont and Pickering and reopened as a Heritage Steam Railway. The NYMRPS became a charitable trust, the North York Moors Historical Railway Trust Ltd and succeeded in re-opening the line as the North Yorkshire Moors Railway (NYMR) in 1973. The route of the W&P survived.

On 8 February 2005 the company was re-born as a private company for the benefit of the NYMR, with NYMR operating the route.

In 2007 the NYMR obtained the necessary powers and agreements to operate steam trains over the Network Rail line from Grosmont to Whitby and as far as Battersby, the first UK heritage railway to do so; this means steam trains once again run between Whitby and Pickering.
