= Whitby Strand =

Ancient division of North Yorkshire, England

- Wapentake; Liberty
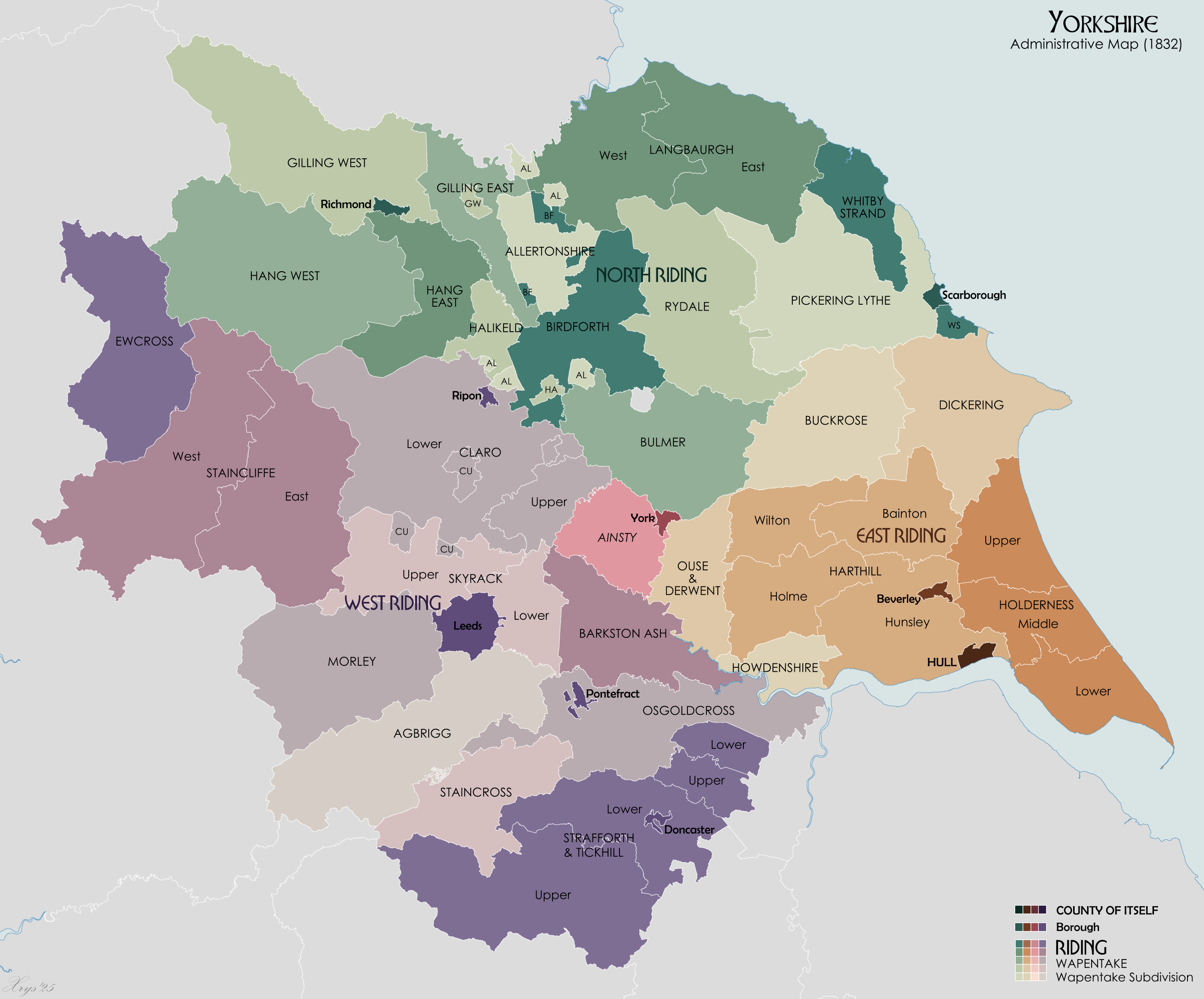
- Wapentakes of North Yorkshire. Whitby Strand is a dark green colour on the coast
- Area
  - 1840: 43,270 acres (17,510 ha)
  - 1858: 93,060 acres (37,660 ha)
  - Coordinates: 54.466°N 0.610°W
- History
  - Preceded by: Langbaurgh Wapentake; Pickering Lythe

Whitby Strand was a wapentake and liberty in the North Riding of Yorkshire, England. It was one of thirteen wapentakes across the old North Riding of Yorkshire. The division of the area into the Liberty and Wapentake of Whitby Strand occurred in the 14th century, previous to this, the settlements were in the wapentakes of Langbaurgh and Pickering Lythe.

== History ==
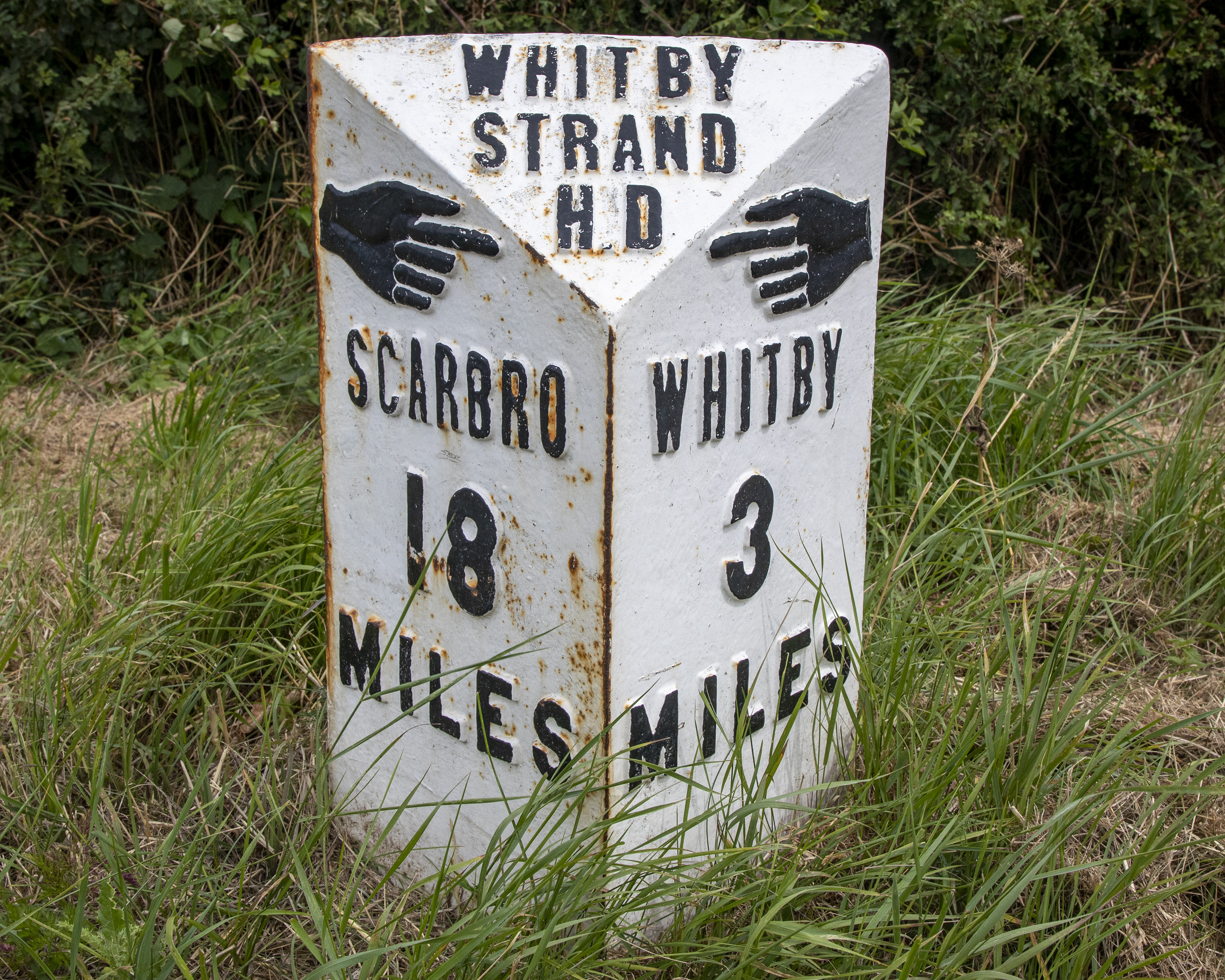
Whitby Strand Milepost at Hawsker

At the time of the Norman Conquest, the land that would form the division of Whitby Strand wapentake, belonged to Gospatric, who fled to Scotland, and the confiscated land was given to Hugh Lopas. Lopas disliked the area, so gave it to his friend, William de Percy. William de Percy died in c. 1096 and the granting of the land was confirmed by his son, Alan de Percy (who died c. 1135). Ownership of the region is disputed around that time, as Young states the area belonged to Siward, and that it was divided between the Langbaurgh and Pickering Lythe wapentakes, (to the north and south respectively) as the wapentake did not exist at the time of the Domesday survey. (Note: Most of the settlements in Whitby Strand at the time of the Domesday survey were included in the Langeberge (Langbaurgh) Wapentake.) Whitby Strand as a name for the area was not recorded until 1316, and the liberty was composed of four distinct regions: Whitby, Sneaton, The Chapelry of Fylingdales, and Hackness. The title of the liberty and wapentake derives from the Scandinavian name for Whitby – Streonshalh. (Note: Various spellings exist; Streonaeshalch, Streonshall, and Streonshale.) Historians disagree on the etymology of Streonshalh, though all agree on the language it derives from. One version is that the name translates as Strandshall, the Tower on the Strand (possibly a reference to an early lighthouse).

Not long after the Conquest, most of the land within the boundaries of what would become Whitby Strand was managed by those who ran the religious order at Whitby Abbey, however, after the Dissolution, a great portion of the land was purchased by Sir Richard Cholmley. Prior to the Dissolution, much of the land was given over to agriculture, raising animals, and fishing, with the monks from the abbey working some of the land themselves. The wapentake and liberty were referred to as Monastic in some documents, and the poll tax returns for 1379 list the settlements of the area as being within Whitby and Byland. All of the individual areas of the wapentake were later recognised as being one administrative area, including the small enclave around Byland Abbey. (Note: Besides those settlements in the immediate boundaries of Whitby Strand, the Byland recording of 1379 lists Middlesbrough and Newham, and Ampleforth.)

In the south of the wapentake, the boundary between Whitby Strand and Pickering Lythe was an ancient line known as Green Dike (or Greendike). This boundary proceeded southerly from near to Ravenscar, with the Green Dike encompassing Suffield in the south, and the source of the River Derwent via the Lilla Cross through Littlebeck on the western side. Then towards the north-west through Egton, and then due northwards through East Row (called Thordisa in ancient times) and out to the sea. (Note: The boundaries of Whitby Strand were listed in 1135 as; Blawych Creek, (an inlet below Peak alum works at Ravenscar), Grenedic (Green Dike), Swinestichage, Thornelaye, Coppekeldebroc, Staincrossegate, Gretaheved, Lilla Cross, Scograineshoues, Sylehou, Lithebech, St Hilda's Spring, Horsecroft, and Thordisa (East Row).) The granting of rights over the wapentake included the sea to a depth of 14 fathoms (84 ft; 26 m) and also seaweed. There was a stipulation for fishing rights, including upstream of the River Esk to Ruswarp.

In 1831, the wapentake extended to 43,270 acres (17,510 ha), and had a population of 13,966. Changes to the administrative area of the wapentake in the early 19th century meant that the parishes of Egton, Hinderwell and Lythe were added, with some land around Hackness given over to the Pickering Lythe Wapentake. By 1858, the Whitby Strand Wapentake covered some 93,060 acres (37,660 ha), and was one of thirteen wapentakes across the North Riding of Yorkshire. The wapentake/liberty extended for some 18 miles (29 km) on a north–south axis, and was between 2–6 miles (3.2–9.7 km) wide, varying in breadth. The section between Whitby and Robin Hood's Bay was bordered by the North Sea (then known as the German Ocean). By 1871, the wapentake's population was 17,541.

== Settlements ==
In terms of toponymy, very few Anglo-Saxon names have survived with the old boundary of Whitby Strand, most names associated with the wapentake are Scandinavian in origin. In 1862, Whitby Strand was listed as having twenty townships and two parishes.

- Aislaby
- Briggswath
- Broxa
- Cayton (a detached part of Whitby Strand in the Borough of Scarborough)
- Egton
- Egton Bridge
- Eskdaleside
- Fylingthorpe
- Grosmont
- Hackness
- Harwood Dale
- Hawsker-cum-Stainsacre (township)
- Iburndale
- Newholm-cum-Dunsley
- Normanby
- Row (Note: The name of the hamlet has changed since the cessation of the wapentake system. The settlement is now known as Raw.)
- Ruswarp
- Robin Hood's Bay
- Silpho
- Sleights
- Sneaton
- Sneatonthorpe
- Suffield
- Ugglebarnby
- Whitby
