= Murgatroyd =

Surname among English nobility

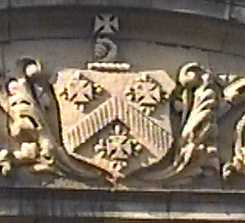
The Murgatroyd Coat of Arms as granted to Michael Murgatroyd at the turn of the 17th Century.

Murgatroyd (with variants, including Murgatroid) is a surname among the English nobility, originating in Yorkshire. Its etymology, according to one source, is as follows: In 1371, a constable in the district of Warley in Yorkshire took the name Johanus de Morgateroyde, or literally John of Moor Gate Royde, 'the district leading to the moor'. In Old Norse, royd means "clearing" (forest cut down for agriculture). Although Moorgate in London was a gate with the road to the moor passing through, in Yorkshire, gate (again from Old Norse) means "street", so Moor Gate Royd would be 'a clearing in the forest on the road to the moor'.

Another source says the placename means Margaret's road.

Moor-gate-royd, or Murgatroyd as of 1432 when a John Murgatroyd of Murgatroyd was first recorded as residing there, was on the southern slopes of Highroad Well Moor. Another variation in spelling, Morgadrode, is seen in 1452, as the surname of a Halifax yeoman.

Murgatroyd, the stately home and seat of the family, was the site of the Battle of the Hollins (named after the forest below the estate) on 23 October 1643 during the English Civil War. James Murgatroyd, owner of the estate and Head Grieve of Warley, had put his property at the disposal of Cavalier (Royalist) commander Sir Francis Mackworth to house a contingent of family-backed Royalists and accompanying munitions. Parliamentarians (commonly called Roundheads or Ironsides) under Colonel Robert Bradshaw and Captain Taylor, comprising two Lancashire Companies and eleven 'Clubists', marched to the fortified home.

The Royalist captain would no doubt have made ready for the attack. He was pleasantly engaged in a tete-a-tete with his host James Murgatroyd and his good wife Mary, on the invincibility of their sturdy homestead, when suddenly they were arrested by the ping of Roundhead bullets. It wasn't exactly a Marston Moor, this battle of the Hollins, but quite sufficiently exciting while it lasted. Both sides fought with great valour, not only with guns and swords but also after the manner of the Middle Ages, by hurling great stones at the heads of the enemy. However, there wasn't an earthly chance for the Murgatroyd party, the Ironsides were too strong. In the words of Cromwell, "they were as stubble to our swords". It was all over in an hour, 44 prisoners being taken with all the arms and ammunition, the Captain and three men alone escaping.

With much of Murgatroyd badly damaged in the fighting, James Murgatroyd moved the family seat to one of his other estates, East Riddlesden Hall. Now owned by the National Trust, this property is most associated with the family to this day.

== People ==
- Ian Murgitroyd (1944-2021), Scottish businessman, founder of Murgitroyd & Company
- Cecil G. Murgatroyd (1958–2001), long-running satirical political candidate in Australia and New Zealand
- Gavin Murgatroyd (born 1969), Namibian cricketer (previously known as Bryan Murgatroyd)
- Henry Murgatroyd (1853–1905), English cricketer
- Michael Murgatroyd (1925–2004), English-born Scottish nationalist political activist
- Peta Murgatroyd (born 1986), professional dancer
- Stephen Murgatroyd (born 1950), writer, broadcaster and consultant
- Miss Murgatroid, pseudonym of Alicia J. Rose, American musician and singer

== Fictional characters ==
- Miss Murgatroyd, character played by Marie Wilson in the 1936 film Satan Met a Lady
- Major Murgatroyd, Officer of Dragoon Guards, in the 1881 Gilbert and Sullivan opera Patience
- The Murgatroyd family, a line of cursed baronets, in the Gilbert and Sullivan 1887 opera Ruddigore
- The Murgatroyd family of businesspeople, in the game Fallen London
- Evelyn Murgatroyd, in The Voyage Out, a 1915 novel by Virginia Woolf
- General Murgatroyd, in Highland Fling, a 1931 novel by Nancy Mitford
- Murgatroyd and Winterbottom, a British comedy act consisting of Ronald Frankau and Tommy Handley
- Ambrose Murgatroyd, in the 1941 Preston Sturges movie The Lady Eve
- Miss Amy Murgatroyd, in A Murder Is Announced, a 1950 novel by Agatha Christie
- Murgatroyd, a tormal, the cat-like companion of Dr. Calhoun in the Med Service series of science fiction stories by Murray Leinster
- Murgatroyd, the pet dog of Ida Lupino's character in Private Hell 36, a 1954 film noir directed by Don Siegel
- Murgatroyd, pet rabbit of the eponymous main character in Celia, a 1989 film directed by Ann Turner
- Alice Margatroid, in the Touhou Project series of video games
- Murgatroyd, one of Morwen's cats in the Enchanted Forest Chronicles by Patricia Wrede
- Reginald "Reggie" Murgatroid, from The X-Files episode "The Lost Art of Forehead Sweat"
- Candice and Sam Murgatroyd, in the British television programme Ackley Bridge
- Cousin Murgatroyd, a cousin of Big Bird mentioned in Sesame Street Episode 1090
- Murgatroyd, a galactic crime boss in the Lensman series of science fiction novels by Edward Elmer "Doc" Smith
- Murgatroyd, the disgraced former butler of Aunt Dahlia, in the Jeeves and Wooster stories of P. G. Wodehouse.
- Roger Murgatroyd, henpecked husband of Edna Murgatroyd, in the story The Emperor in Frederick Forsyth's 1972 anthology No Comebacks
- Mr Mergatroid, a lovesick talking robot, in the BBC Radio 4 comedy Time Spanner
- Maris Murgatroyd, the Scholar Mistress of Arcane Arts at the Wundrous Society in the book series Nevermoor by Jessica Townsend
- Freda Murgatroyd, a protagonist in the novel Shrines of Gaiety by Kate Atkinson
- Mr Murgatroyd, Minister Elisabeth Rawley's helper in UnLondon in Un Lun Dun by China Miéville
- Mr Murgatroyd, First Mate, in the novel Eversion by Alastair Reynolds
- Towards the end of the 1984 song "Jam On It" by Newcleus, a background voice asks “Hey, you fellas seen my sister Mergatroid?”

== Heavens to Murgatroyd! ==
The catchphrase "Heavens to Murgatroyd!" was used by the Hanna-Barbera cartoon character Snagglepuss (and not, despite rumors to the contrary, by Bert Lahr).

The band Fair to Midland has a song called "Heavens to Murgatroyd" on the 2013 album Arrows and Anchors.
