= Alfred John Brown (writer) =

English literary and topographical writer

Alfred J. Brown
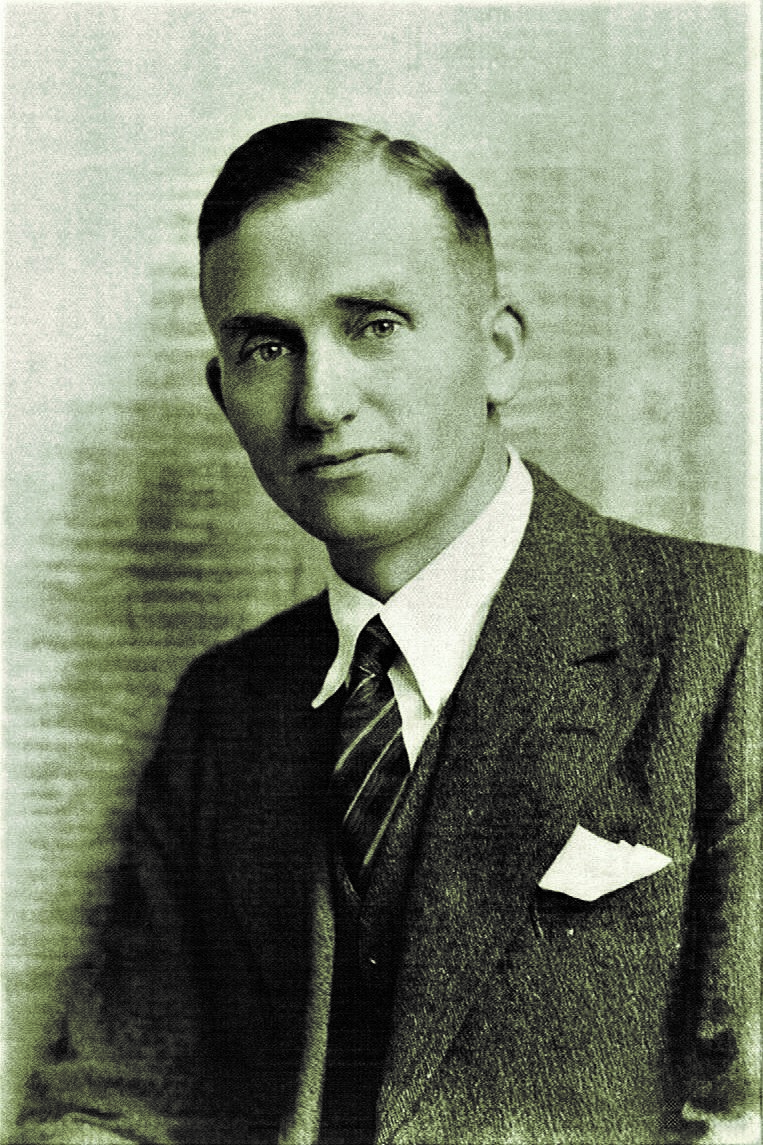
- Born: Alfred John Brown; 21 August 1894; Bradford, West Riding of Yorkshire, England
- Died: 1 March 1969 (aged 74)
- Resting place: Sleights, Yorkshire, England
- Citizenship: British
- Occupations: Wool Merchant, Hotelier and Writer
- Spouse: Marie-Eugenie (nee Bull)
- Children: 5
- Writing career
- Pen name: Julian Laverack
- Genres: Travel writing, Novelist, Poetry
- Notable work: Tramping... series

Alfred John Brown (21 August 1894 – 1 March 1969) was an English literary and topographical writer, born in Bradford in the West Riding of Yorkshire, England.

== Education ==
Brown was educated at St Joseph's Primary School in Little Horton, Bradford, and St. Bede's Grammar School in Bradford, before becoming a wool trade trainee.

== Career ==
As a youth he developed what became a lifelong passion for moorland walking (which he referred to as 'tramping'). He spent most of his career in the wool trade with interruptions for military service in both World Wars. In World War One he served as a gunner with the 2/2 West Riding Brigade of the Royal Field Artillery before being medically discharged in 1916 with post-diphtheria paralysis, and he subsequently spent six years in recovery. In World War Two, although too old for active service, he served as an intelligence officer with RAF Bomber Command reaching the rank of acting wing commander. In the interwar years he married and with his wife raised a family of five children at Burley-in-Wharfedale in the West Riding of Yorkshire. After discharge from the RAF he and his wife ran a small hotel, Whitfield House, at Darnholme near Goathland on the north eastern moorlands of the North Riding of Yorkshire and he then made an unsuccessful attempt at becoming a full time writer. He subsequently returned to the Bradford wool trade and established an overseas textiles sales agency which he ran together with one of his sons.

== Literary works ==
Brown is best known for his Yorkshire tramping books but also published four personal stories, two novels (under the pseudonym Julian Laverack) and a book of poetry. In addition, he was a regular contributor to a number of publications including the Dalesman magazine.

His first two published books were 'A Joyous Entry into Brighter Belgium' a travelogue and a semi-autobiographical novel entitled 'The Lean Years' (under the pseudonym Julian Laverack). The travelogue was based upon a journey around Belgium taken by Brown in 1922. The novel describes the recuperation of an invalided soldier working in the West Riding wool trade after World War 1 mirroring Brown's recovery from diphtheria from 1916 onwards.

Brown's third book, Four Boon Fellows - A Yorkshire Tramping Odyssey, was again semi-autobiographical & was based upon a journey taken together with his cousin, Laurence Geoghegan, from the northern border of Yorkshire in Teesdale southwards to Ilkley, a distance of just short of 100 miles on foot. The book has a structure that is a cross between a novel and a travelogue, and describes the journey as undertaken by four individuals from differing areas of Yorkshire each given a nick-name of a Yorkshire river: Wharfe, Ouse, Aire & Swale indicating the area of Yorkshire which they came from. The interactions of the four individuals over a four day period at Easter are described as they walked southwards through the Yorkshire Pennines and is used as a back-drop to explore and evaluate differing aspects of Yorkshire character, scenery and folklore. A secondary theme of the book is the author's comments on, and personal dismay at, the increasing use of country roads and lanes by cars and motor cycles to the detriment of the enjoyment of those who go on their own two feet. The book was well received and got good reviews in a wide variety of publications with reviewers praising Brown's ambition in using an unusual structure to record and evaluate a vast range of differing aspects of the historic county of Yorkshire.

Following his marriage in 1927 and the setting up of a family home at Burley-in-Wharfedale, Brown set about planning the research and writing of his Yorkshire 'Tramping' trilogy: Moorland Tramping in West Yorkshire (1931), Tramping in Yorkshire - North and East (1932) and the combined volume, Striding Through Yorkshire (1938). In these books Brown documents journeys on foot across Yorkshire and describes in detail the scenery, history and character of the locations visited. These three books are entirely factual but can be seen as following on in succession from the preceding novel/travelogue, Four Boon Fellows, both in terms of written style and the themes explored.

As a result of the success of his 'Tramping' books, during the 1930s and 1940s he was one of the most widely read authors writing about the Yorkshire Dales in particular and the whole of the historical county of Yorkshire in general. He inspired whole generations of Dales' lovers and walkers to explore the county of foot and he became something of a Yorkshire icon in his day, e.g.: he was one of six Bradford authors invited to compile a Book of Words for the Bradford Historical Pangeant in 1931; he was invited to be inaugural guest speaker for the Cambridge University Yorkshire Society in March 1936 and again a year later at that Society's first anniversary dinner.; he was an invited guest at the Yorkshire Authors' Dinner held in Leeds in October 1938 and he was a contributor to the first edition of The Yorkshire Dalesman in April 1939. He was president of the West Riding Ramblers Association for fifteen years and later became first president of the Fellowship of Fell Walkers. He was known throughout Yorkshire as 'AJ' and the 'King of Ramblers'.

During and after the Second World War Brown's literary output continued with a mixture of semi-autobiographical stories and factual, topographical books and, for him, a new style of work, a book of poetry.

In 1949 Brown self financed a print run of 500 copies of his 'Poems and Songs'. This book comprised 102 poems and song lyrics, a minor proportion had been previously published, some within his travel and fiction books, and others in magazines and periodicals. The poems were in six categories: 'Hospital Rhymes' relating to his years of sickness during and following World War One; 'Wind On The Face' concerning his outdoor life; 'Office Rhymes' relating to his working life; a section comprising song lyrics, 'Songs of the Yorkshire Dales and Inns'; a number of emotional poems, 'Love Lyrics'; and a final catch-all section of 'Miscellaneous' poems. As the book was self published and distributed, with a limited print run, it received only one published review which, although short, was positive. Brown's final substantial published work was the Guide Book to the North York Moors National Park commissioned by the North Riding of Yorkshire County Council. It was first published in 1958 with further revised editions published in 1959, 1963, 1965 and 1967.

== Personal life ==
Brown's parents were Alfred John and Anne Brown (née Geoghegan). As a child he lived at 13 Spring Place, Little Horton, Bradford, with elder siblings, Edwin and Gertrude, and younger twins, Tom and Vera. Brown's Catholic Faith was a strong influence throughout his life and influenced much of his writing. Brown died in 1969. Despite both being Roman Catholic, he and his wife are buried together in the churchyard of St John the Evangelist's, Sleights, North Yorkshire which is a Church of England parish Church. His gravestone is inscribed with what is probably his most famous phrase; "There must be Dales in Paradise, which you and I shall find."

== Legacy ==
A detailed biography entitled Alfred John Brown - Walker, Writer and Passionate Yorkshire Man was published in 2016 authored by John A. White. In 2019 Alfred J Brown earned the distinction of having a biographical entry placed in the Oxford Dictionary of National Biography.

On the 50th anniversary of Brown's death in 2019, an anthology of his early poetry was published; most of the poems had not previously appeared in print.

There are two walks commemorating Brown's life. The Alfred Brown Trail is a 6 mile walk located in Lower Wharfedale and visits numerous localities associated with Brown in the area around Burley-in-Wharfedale where he made his family home in the interwar years. ‘Tramping in A.J. Brown Country’ is a 10-mile excursion around the Goathland – Sleights area that visits/passes many localities associated with Brown's life in that area. It begins with a train ride along part of Eskdale from Sleights to Grosmont followed by a walk over the Goathland moors and along the Murk Esk Dale, Goathland Dale and Iburndale valleys to return to the start.

There are two Blue Plaques in Yorkshire commemorating A J Brown. The first has been placed at The Hermit Inn, Burley Woodhead in Wharfedale, a hostelry frequented by Brown when he lived at Burley-in-Wharfedale. The second was placed at the former Whitfield House Hotel, Goathland by the North Yorkshire Moors Association. These blue plaque locations are visited by the commemorative walks described above.

A collection of A J Brown's literary manuscripts, personal papers and correspondence has been placed with West Yorkshire County Archives in Bradford.

== Bibliography ==
- Brown, Alfred J. A Joyous Entry into Brighter Belgium (Simpkin, Marshall, Hamilton, Kent & Co. Ltd., 1923)
- Laverack, Julian (pseudonym of Alfred J. Brown). The Lean Years (Methuen, 1926)
- Brown, Alfred J. Four Boon Fellows - A Yorkshire tramping Odyssey (J M Dent & Sons, 1928)
- Brown, Alfred J. Moorland Tramping in West Yorkshire (Country Life, 1931)
- Brown, Alfred J. Tramping in Yorkshire (North and East) (Country Life, 1932)
- Brown, Alfred J. Striding Through Yorkshire (Country Life, 1938)
- Squadron Leader A.J. Brown. Ground Staff (A Personal Record) (Eyre & Spottiswoode, 1943)
- Laverack, Julian (pseudonym of Alfred J. Brown). Whittaker (John Gifford, 1946)
- Brown, Alfred J. Broad Acres - A Yorkshire Miscellany (Country Life, 1948)
- Brown, Alfred J. Poems & Songs (Abbey Press, Horne & Son, 1949)
- Brown, A.J. I Bought a Hotel (Williams and Northgate, 1950)
- Brown, A.J. Fair North Riding (Country Life Ltd., 1952)
- Brown, A.J. Farewell, 'High Fell' (Williams and Northgate, 1952)
- Brown, A.J. The North Yorkshire Moors National Park Guide Book (The Home Publishing Co., 1958)
- Brown, A.J. The North York Moors National Park Guide Book (C & D Constaple Limited, revised editions: 1959, 1963, 1965, 1967)
- White, John A. Alfred John Brown - Walker, Writer and Passionate Yorkshire Man (Smith Settle, 2016) ISBN 978-1-5262-0511-7
- White, John A. The Early 20th Century Poetry of Alfred John Brown (1894-1969) (Smith Settle Printing & Bookbinding, 2019)
- White, John A. Brown, Alfred John [pseud. Julian Laverack] (1894–1969) (Oxford Dictionary of National Biography, on-line edition, 2019)
