= St Bede's Grammar School =

St. Bede's Grammar School
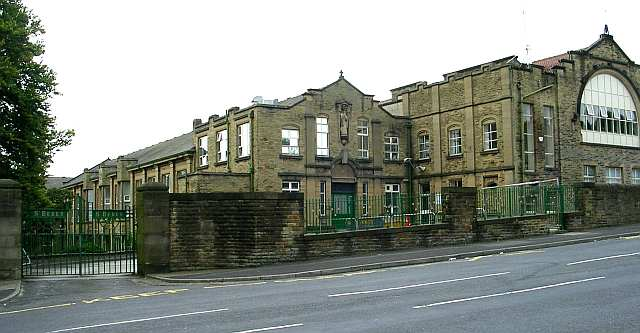

Location
- Highgate; Heaton; Bradford, West Yorkshire, BD9 4BQ; England; 53.81523°N 1.78741°W

Information
- Type: Secondary school
- Motto: Ora Et Labora (Latin: Prayer and Work)
- Religious affiliations: Roman Catholic; Diocese of Leeds
- Established: 1900
- Closed: 2014
- Local authority: City of Bradford
- Executive Headteacher: P. Heitzman
- Headteacher: F. Ashcroft
- Colours: Green & Gold
- Publication: The Baeda
- School hymn: Baeda
- Sixth form: St Benedict's Sixth Form
- Website: http://www.stbedesbradford.net/

St. Bede's Grammar School, in Heaton, Bradford, West Yorkshire, England, was a Roman Catholic boys' Secondary school. The school merged with St. Joseph's Catholic College in September 2014 to form St Bede's and St Joseph's Catholic College. The school is based over both of the former school sites.

== School history ==
=== Grammar school ===
St. Bede's Grammar School opened on 12 June 1900, in Drewton Street, Bradford. Its first Headmaster was Rev. Dr. Arthur Hinsley, later Rector of the Venerable English College, Rome, Apostolic Delegate to Africa, and Cardinal Archbishop of Westminster (1935–1943).

In 1919 the school was moved to its present site at Heaton Hall. The old Hall, home of the Rosse family, proved unsatisfactory as the number of pupils continued to grow and a new school was opened in 1939. Since then many additions and alterations have been made to the accommodation. A new technical wing was built in the 1950s, a new refectory and sixth form centre were added in the 1960s.

=== Comprehensive ===
The school has had comprehensive status since the 1960s, and was no longer a grammar school. A Maths/English block was built in the 1970s. New Science laboratories were opened in 2001 and new ICT facilities were provided. By 2008 a new sports hall was opened by Labour Minister for Sports (at the time) Gerry Sutcliffe. A new extension containing new offices and classrooms was built in the late 2000s.

From 2008 the school had one federated governing body with St Joseph's Catholic College and Yorkshire Martyrs Catholic College and when Yorkshire Martyrs closed in 2010 the boys transferred to St Bede's. An Executive Headteacher was appointed in 2009 to oversee both St Bede's and St Joseph's.

=== Merger ===
The school merged with St. Joseph's Catholic College in September 2014 to form St Bede's and St Joseph's Catholic College. The former St. Bede's is now used as the upper school site of the new school.

== Sixth Form ==
St Bede's shared an associated sixth form with St. Joseph's Catholic College for many years. In 2008 the sixth forms of St Bede's and St Joseph's joined with the sixth form of Yorkshire Martyrs Catholic College to form the Bradford Catholic Sixth Form. When Yorkshire Martyrs closed in 2010 the sixth form transferred to St Bede's and St Joseph's and in 2011 the Sixth Form was renamed St Benedict's Sixth Form.

== School Hymn ==
BAEDA, on this great day, we greet Thee on thy throne!And beg thy presence where we meet To bless this stone!

Thou who did'st plant the tiny seed Whence sprang the Tree:
Attend us in our present need And hear our plea.

Grant that our School, like thine, may grow Strong with the years:
Hold thou the Torch that we may know When danger nears!

We are thy children, and our School Bears thy great name:
Weare most proud to learn thy Rule And spread thy fame!

Under thy banner and thy shield, Clad in thy mail:
We shall not shrink: we shall not yield: We shall not fail! ALFRED J. BROWN.

== Notable former pupils ==
=== Comprehensive ===
- Paul Bolland, footballer
- Mark Bower, footballer
- Joe Cooke (footballer)
- Danny Devine, footballer
- Nick Doody, comedian and writer
- Barry Gallagher, footballer
- Roly Gregoire, Sunderland F.C. footballer
- Dave Halley, rugby league player
- Wayne Heseltine, footballer
- Andy Kiwomya, footballer
- Chris Kiwomya, footballer
- Stepan Lucyszyn FREng, Professor, Imperial College London
- Danny Verity, footballer

=== Grammar school ===
- Desmond Albrow, Assistant Editor from 1976 to 1987 of The Sunday Telegraph, and Editor from 1966 to 1971 of the Catholic Herald
- John Braine, novelist, first of the angry young men, whose 1957 book Room at the Top became a 1959 film, the first kitchen-sink film, and received six Oscar nominations, winning Best Actress for Simone Signoret in the 1959 Oscars
- Lord Brennan, lawyer and Labour parliamentarian, President from 1964 to 1965 of the University of Manchester Students' Union, and President from 2001 to 2014 of the Catholic Union of Great Britain, and from 2008 to 2013 of Canning House
- Alfred John Brown (writer)
- Johnnie Casson, comedian
- Monsignor Bernard Doyle, former headmaster of St Thomas Aquinas Grammar School in Leeds (now Cardinal Heenan Catholic High School)
- Alfred J. Brown topographical writer, novelist and poet.
- John Hellawell, footballer, younger brother of Mike
- Mike Hellawell, footballer, played two international games for England in 1962
- Bernard Hepton, well-known actor in the 1970s for the Kommandant in Colditz and Albert Foiret in Secret Army (1977–79), and for Toby Esterhase in the 1979 Tinker Tailor Soldier Spy
- Mick Hopkinson, canoeist, (first expedition to canoe down Everest)
- Geoff Lister, Chief Executive from 1985 to 1995 of the Bradford & Bingley building society, chairman from 1993 to 1994 of the Building Societies Association
- Prof Paul Madden, Provost since 2008 of The Queen's College, Oxford, Joseph Black Professor of Chemistry from 2006 to 2008 at the University of Oxford
- Peter Marks (1961–67), Chief Executive from 2007 to 2013 of The Co-operative Group, and from 2002 to 2007 of United Co-operatives
- Martin McEvoy, opera singer
- Paul McKee (mathematician), established election-night TV presentations in 1964, and throughout the 1970s and 1980s, on ITN, with David Nicholas, and deputy chief executive from 1977 to 1989 of Yorkshire Television
- Rev Gerald Moverley, Bishop of Hallam (Roman Catholic Diocese of Hallam in South Yorkshire) from 1980 to 1996
- Stephen Murgatroyd, academic in Canada
- Prof John Murray, Dean of Dentistry from 1992 to 2002 at School of Dental Sciences, Newcastle University, and Professor of Child Health from 1977 to 1992
- John Northard, chairman from 1991 to 1993 of British Coal, President from 1982 to 1983 of the Institution of Mining and Metallurgy
- John Riley-Schofield (John Riley), baritone (German Wikipedia link)
- Smokie, 1970s pop music group
- Antony G. Sweeney, deputy director from 1991 to 2004 of the National Museum of Photography, Film & Television

== See also ==
- St Bede's College, Manchester
- former Bede Grammar School for Boys, became Sunderland College
