= Listed buildings in Eskdaleside cum Ugglebarnby =

Eskdaleside cum Ugglebarnby is a civil parish in the county of North Yorkshire, England. It contains 38 listed buildings that are recorded in the National Heritage List for England. All the listed buildings are designated at Grade II, the lowest of the three grades, which is applied to "buildings of national importance and special interest". The parish contains the settlements of Sleights, Ugglebarnby, Briggswath and Iburndale, and the surrounding countryside. Most of the listed buildings are houses, cottages and associated structures, farmhouses and farm buildings. The others include churches, a monument in a churchyard, a ruined chapel, boundary stones, a milepost, a public house, a former railway station, a drinking fountain, and a commemorative obelisk.

== Buildings ==
Name and location	Photograph	Date	Notes
St John's Chapel; 54.45350°N 0.67567°W		Late 13th century	The chapel, now a ruin, is in sandstone on a chamfered plinth, and consists of a continuous nave and chancel. The main surviving remnant is part of the west wall, containing the remains of a chamfered window opening, and the lower parts of the north and east walls.
Cayley Becks Farmhouse; 54.44700°N 0.68162°W	—	Late 17th century	The farmhouse is in sandstone, and has a pantile roof with coped gables and shaped kneelers. There are two storeys, three bays and a rear outshut. The doorway has a chamfered quoined surround, and the windows are mullioned with quoined surrounds.
Carr Hill Farmhouse; 54.46734°N 0.65626°W	—	Late 17th to early 18th century	The house, which was later extended, is in sandstone, and has roofs of pantile and slate with coped gables and shaped kneelers. There are two storeys and an attic, three bays, and a single-bay extension on the left. On the front is a gabled porch, and a doorway with a chamfered surround and a four-centred arched head. To its right is a staircase window and a fire window. The other windows on the front are sashes, some tripartite. At the rear and in the right return are mullioned windows, and at the rear is a window with a keystone on square Doric columns.
Esk Hall; 54.45829°N 0.66624°W	—	Early to mid 18th century	A small country house, later extended and used for other purposes, it is in sandstone with a moulded eaves cornice, a plain parapet and a roof of stone slate to the original part and slate to the extension. The original block has a central bay, two storeys and an attic, and flanking two-storey canted bays. Between them is a porch with a sill band and impost bands, containing a doorway with a segmental arched hood and a keystone on moulded brackets. Flanking the doorway are narrow sash windows, over which are oval panels with monograms. The upper floor contains a Venetian window, and in the attic is a sash window. The extension to the right has two storeys and two bays.
Howlet Hall; 54.45180°N 0.63676°W	—	c. 1750	A farmhouse in sandstone on a chamfered plinth, with a moulded eaves cornice, and a pantile roof with coped gables and moulded kneelers. There are two storeys, a double depth plan, a main range of five bays, and a right wing with one storey and an attic and one bay. The doorway has a radial fanlight with a round-arched Gibbs surround, and the windows are sashes in architraves. All the openings have vertically tooled lintels.
Boundary stone at Red Gate; 54.42986°N 0.62591°W	—	18th century	The parish boundary stone is a monolith about 0.6 metres (2 ft 0 in) high. The east side is inscribed "SNEATON L".
Eskdale Gate Farmhouse; 54.44812°N 0.67363°W		Mid 18th century	The farmhouse is in sandstone, and has a Roman tile roof with coped gables and shaped kneelers. There are two storeys and seven bays. The doorway has a quoined surround and a dated lintel. The windows vary and have rusticated surrounds and keystones.
Gate piers and part of churchyard wall, St John's Church, Sleights; 54.45031°N 0.66576°W		1761	The wall and gate piers are in sandstone. The square gate piers are rusticated, and each pier has alternately rectangular and cylindrical blocks, a flat cap, and a ball finial on a bell-shaped pedestal. The flanking walls have foliate volutes and chamfered coping, and are ramped up to four obelisks. Each obelisk has blind Gothic tracery and tall panels. The southwest obelisk has an inscribed sundial on two faces and an inscription with initials and the date.
The Old Vicarage; 54.45370°N 0.66462°W	—	1765	The vicarage, later a private house, is in sandstone, partly rendered at the rear, with a moulded eaves cornice over a frieze of blind quatrefoils, and a roof of pantile at the front and slate at the rear, with coped gables and shaped kneelers. There are two storeys, a front range of three bays, two rear wings, a service extension, and a single-storey single-bay wing on the left. The doorway has an architrave, a moulded cornice hood and a blind quatrefoil frieze, and above it is an oval decorated and inscribed datestone. The windows are sashes in architraves with triple keystones.
Wall and gate piers, The Old Vicarage; 54.45390°N 0.66474°W	—	1765 (probable)	The garden wall and gate piers are in sandstone. The wall has flat coping and is about 1.25 metres (4 ft 1 in) high, rising to 2 metres (6 ft 7 in). The gate piers are square and have shallow pyramidal caps.
Barn southeast of Cayley Becks Farmhouse; 54.44689°N 0.68130°W	—	Late 18th century	The barn is in sandstone, with quoins, a raised aves band, and a pantile roof with coped gables and shaped kneelers. There is a single storey with a loft, and two bays. It contains doorways with quoined surrounds, pitching windows, and slit vents.
Farm buildings southeast of Howlet Hall Farmhouse; 54.45148°N 0.63651°W	—	Late 18th century	The farm buildings are in sandstone with a pantile roof hipped at the left end. They have one storey and lofts, and form two ranges at right angles of three and four bays. The openings include stable doors, a pitching window and dove holes.
Farm buildings east of Howlet Hall Farmhouse; 54.45167°N 0.63656°W	—	Late 18th century	The farm buildings are in sandstone with pantile roofs. They have one storey and lofts, and four bays, and consist of a cowhouse, a pigsty and a boiling house. The openings include doors, windows, a slit vent and dove holes.
Line of boundary stones 54.41232°N 0.67742°W	—	Late 18th century	The five parish boundary stones are in gritstone. Each consists of a rectangular monolith, and some are inscribed.
Lowdale Hall; 54.45657°N 0.65657°W	—	Late 18th century	A small country house in sandstone, with quoins, floor and eaves bands, and a hipped slate roof with corner volutes. There are two storeys and three bays. On the front is a prostyle Tuscan porch approached by steps. The windows are small-paned in architraves.
The Salon; 54.46207°N 0.66033°W		Late 18th century	The building is in sandstone, and has a pantile roof with coped gables and plain kneelers. There is one storey and three bays. In the centre is a round-headed doorway with a radial fanlight, the outer bays contain round-headed sash windows, and all the openings have archivolts with keystones.
Tinkler Hall; 54.45373°N 0.64602°W	—	Late 18th century	A farmhouse in sandstone, with a pantile roof, coped gables and shaped kneelers. There are two storeys and two bays, and a single-storey two-bay wing on the right. On the front is a doorway, and the windows are sashes, those in the main part are tripartite with tooled lintels and keystones. In the right return is a re-set dated lintel.
Coates Monument; 54.45041°N 0.66566°W		c. 1778	The monument in the churchyard of St John's Church commemorates members of the Coates family. It is in sandstone with a square plan, and consists of a concave obelisk, standing on a moulded base decorated with acanthus. On the sides are memorial panels surrounded by rinceaux in low relief.
Newton House, outbuilding and walls 54.42330°N 0.63433°W	—	c. 1800	A small country house in sandstone on a plinth, with slate roofs. It consists of a main block with two storeys and three bays, flanking two-storey two-bay cross-wings, all with hipped roofs, and a single-storey outbuilding on the right. On the front is a Roman Doric prostyle porch with a triglyph frieze and a moulded cornice, and a doorway with pilasters. There are floor bands, an eaves band, the windows are sashes, and in the right wing is a canted bay window. The outbuilding has a coped gable and a shaped kneeler. The garden walls have flat coping, and are in varying heights. The right wall has a round-arched opening with voussoirs, and in the left wall are three openings, one with a lintel, one with an elliptical arch, and the other with a round arch, the arches with voussoirs.
Breckon Howe boundary stone 54.41894°N 0.68582°W		1813	The parish boundary stone is in gritstone, and is a tapering monolith about 1.3 metres (4 ft 3 in) high. There is an inscription on the south face.
Midge Hall; 54.45319°N 0.66484°W		1819	A house, possibly at one time a public house, divided into two, it is in sandstone and has a pantile roof, hipped over the main part, with kneelers over the wings. There are two storeys, flanking single-storey bays, and rear extensions, The doorway has a fanlight, over which is a datestone, and the windows are sashes.
Carr End Farmhouse and carriage shed 54.46229°N 0.65992°W		Early 19th century	The house, which incorporates earlier material, is in sandstone, and has a pantile roof with coped gables and shaped kneelers. There are two storeys, and an L-shaped plan with a front range of three bays, and a rear wing on the left. In the centre is a doorway with a fanlight, the windows are sashes, and all the openings have tooled lintels. To the right is a single-storey carriage shed with a doorway on the front. In the right return is an opening that has an elliptical arch with voussoirs and a keystone, above which is a pitching window with a segmental head and a keystone.
Carr View Hall; 54.45638°N 0.66453°W	—	Early 19th century	A large house in sandstone, the main roof is in stone slate and hipped, and the rear wing partly in Welsh slate. There are two storeys and an attic, and an L-shaped plan, with a front of five bays, four bays on the left return, and a rear wing. The main front has pilasters, a floor band, a moulded eaves cornice, and a coped panelled parapet, stepped up in the centre, and the windows are sashes. On the left return is a projecting porch and a doorway with a fanlight, and at the top is an attic band and a high parapet, ramped up at the ends. At the rear is a round-headed staircase window with shaped voussoirs.
Esk House and outbuilding 54.46197°N 0.66075°W	—	Early 19th century	The house and outbuilding are in sandstone, the house has a slate roof, and the roof of the outbuilding is in pantile, all with coped gables and shaped kneelers. The house has two storeys and two bays, and a central doorway and sash windows, all with painted tooled lintels. The outbuilding to the left has one storey and an attic, and one bay.
Wall east of Eskdale Gate Farmhouse; 54.44809°N 0.67340°W	—	Early 19th century	The garden wall is in sandstone with flat coping. It is between about 1.5 metres (4 ft 11 in) and 2 metres (6 ft 7 in) high, and is ramped up four times along the slope of the ground. On the garden side is a buttress.
Eslet House and Fernlea; 54.45149°N 0.66599°W	—	Early 19th century	A pair of houses in grey stone, with quoins, a sill band, and a slate roof with coped gables and shaped kneelers. There are two storeys and each house has three bays, a central doorway with a fanlight and a bracketed hood, and sash windows.
Field House; 54.45175°N 0.66589°W	—	Early 19th century	The house is in grey stone on a plinth, and has a pantile roof with coped gables and shaped kneelers. There are two storeys, three bays, and a rear two-bay wing. The central doorway has a cornice hood, and is flanked by canted bay windows. The other windows are sashes with wedge lintels and keystones, and at the rear is a tall staircase window.
Stable block and walling, Newton House; 54.42365°N 0.63465°W	—	Early 19th century	A coachman's house, stables, and carriage house in sandstone with slate roofs, it consists of parallel ranges with the carriage house forming a cross-wing. The middle bay has two storeys and an attic, it is flanked by two-storey bays, and on the left is a lean-to. In the centre is a segmental archway, and the windows are sashes with flat arches and voussoirs. Over the middle window is a sundial with an inscription, and in the pedimented attic is an oculus. The attached wall is coped, stepped and raked in places, and against it is a mounting block.
Rosedale Cottage; 54.45194°N 0.65530°W	—	Early 19th century	A pair of cottages in a row of four, in sandstone, with a pantile roof, and a coped gable and kneeler on the left. There is one storey and attics, and two bays. On the front are two doorways, the windows are sashes, those in the attics horizontally-sliding, and two raking dormers.
The Plough Inn; 54.44846°N 0.66652°W		Early 19th century	The public house is in sandstone, and has a pantile roof with coped gables and shaped kneelers. There are two storeys and two bays. The doorway is in the centre, the windows are sashes, and there are two raking dormers.
Rose Cottage and outbuilding 54.45189°N 0.64416°W	—	Early to mid 19th century	The house and outbuilding are in grey stone, the roof of the house is in slate, the outbuilding roof is in blue pantile, and both have coped gables and kneelers. The house has two storeys, three bays and a rear wing, and the outbuilding on the right has one storey and two bays. On the front is a gabled porch, and the windows are sashes.
2 Coach Road, Sleights; 54.46104°N 0.66283°W		1846	A railway station and station house designed by G. T. Andrews, later a private house, it is in sandstone, with quoins and slate roofs. The house has two storeys and three bays, the middle bay projecting and gabled. On the front are two doorways with chamfered surrounds and Tudor arched heads. The windows are mullioned, and on the right return is a canted bay window. The gables have bargeboards and finials. The former station building at the rear has a single storey and five bays, and contains two Tudor-arched doorways and mullioned windows.
Wall and gate piers, Carr End Farmhouse; 54.46220°N 0.65995°W	—	19th century	The garden wall and gate piers are in sandstone. The wall is about 1.25 metres (4 ft 1 in) high, with sloped coping, and it curves round a corner. The gate piers have the same height and sloped tops.
Public drinking fountain 54.43900°N 0.64006°W		1856	The drinking fountain, which incorporates an earlier lion's head, is in sandstone. The lion's head is in marble, and water flows from it into a stone trough set into a square-headed niche. At the top of the wall, which is shaped between volutes, is a semicircular carved panel. On the wall are three engraved plaques.
All Saints' Church, Ugglebarnby; 54.45212°N 0.64438°W		1872	The church, which incorporates earlier material, is built in cream and red brick banding, faced in sandstone, with a roof of tile and pantile. It consists of a nave, a chancel with a south organ chamber and vestry, and a northwest tower. The tower has two stages, diagonal buttresses, a west doorway with a double-chamfered surround, a north window of three stepped lancets, two-light bell openings with pointed arches, a chamfered parapet band, and a plain parapet. Below the east window is a re-set carved stone.
Milepost; 54.45230°N 0.66544°W		Late 19th century	The milepost is on the east side of Coach Road, and is in cast iron. It has a triangular plan, a sloping top and a semicircular back plate. The back plate is inscribed "NORTH RIDING YORKSHIRE", the sloping top has "WHITBY RDC", on the left face are the distances to Pickering and Malton, and on the right face is the distance to Whitby.
Obelisk; 54.42391°N 0.63198°W	—	1882 (possible)	The obelisk is in sandstone, and stands on a stepped plinth with an overhanging flat cap. On the east and west fronts are inscriptions in Latin.
St John's Church, Sleights; 54.45026°N 0.66488°W		1894–95	The church, designed by Ewan Christian in Early English style, is in Grosmont sandstone, with a roof of Westmorland slate. It consists of a nave, a north aisle, a north transept, a chancel, and a northeast tower with a plain parapet and a pyramidal roof. The windows are lancets, and the east window is a stepped tripled lancet.
