= Aladdin (1979 musical) =

Musical/pantomime written by Sandy Wilson

- Original cast recording
- Music: Sandy Wilson
- Lyrics: Sandy Wilson
- Book: Sandy Wilson
- Basis: Aladdin
- Productions: 1979 London

Aladdin is a musical written by Sandy Wilson for the newly refurbished Lyric Theatre, Hammersmith. Although not a pantomime, it played during the theatre's inaugural Christmas pantomime season of 1979/80, opening on 21 December 1979, and starred Richard Freeman as Aladdin, Joe Melia as Tuang Kee Chung (Widow Twankey), Aubrey Woods as Abanazar, Ernest Clark as The Emperor, Martin McEvoy as The Genie, Elisabeth Welch as Fatima and Christine McKenna as Badr-al-Badur.

== Background ==
The Aladdin story (sometimes combined with Ali Baba and other Arabian Nights tales) has been a traditional pantomime subject in England for nearly two hundred years, and numerous versions of this tale have been presented. Sandy Wilson was apparently asked to write a conventional pantomime in this tradition, but he demurred. "Instead of writing a pantomime – a form of theatre about which I know very little – I decided to make Aladdin a musical, and based it on the original story in the Arabian nights."

Despite this, the show closely follows the traditional pantomime story line, including the "pantomime dame" character of Widow Twankey, renamed Tuang Kee Chung. In fact, the cast recording memorializes several rarely-recorded aspects of a traditional Aladdin pantomime, although the plot has fewer gratuitous twists, and the songs are more concerned with plot development than is usually the case in these productions.

== Synopsis ==
The wicked wizard Abanazar, in his desert home in Morocco, summons the spirits to tell him how he may obtain the magic lamp, the source of all power. He is somewhat bemused to discover that the source lies in a Chinese Laundry in Peking, and can be retrieved only by the launderess's ne'er-do-well son Aladdin. The ghostly chorus of the spirits takes us into the next scene, where Aladdin himself is discussing with his mother the virtues of idleness.

The emperor's herald proclaims that anyone looking upon the Princess Badroulbadour as she passes on her way to the baths will be instantly executed. This is just the kind of challenge that Aladdin likes, so he rushes off to try to catch a glimpse of the Princess. When he returns from his quest the Widow is relieved that he is alive, but very concerned that the young couple are in love. Everyone, including the emperor himself, has a pretty shrewd idea of what has happened – but, as he explains in song to his daughter, "Loves's a luxury" that royals must forgo for reasons of state.

Abanazar's arrival seems like just the thing. He quickly convinces the widow and her son (neither of whom is very bright) that he is the boy's long lost uncle and that he will make Aladdin rich. The upshot of this finds Aladdin trapped in the cave — where he inadvertently summons the genie of the ring — a sympathetic young lady who readily agrees to take him to his mother's house, after a few tears over the sad fact that "Genies have no mothers". The Widow Twankey starts to clean the rusty old lamp which is all her son has brought home — thus summoning another, much more powerful genie who makes it clear he will do anything for anyone unless they make unkind remarks about his green colouring. In no time at all Aladdin is a prince, and happily married to the princess of his dreams.

The Widow Twankey is now the Royal Mother-in-law — and manages to dispose of that rusty old lamp to Abanazar (disguised as a pedlar). He is now the Genie's new master – and he quickly takes the palace (complete with the princess and her mother-in-law) to Morocco. Under sentence of death from the emperor, Aladdin follows the palace to Morocco with the aid of the genie of the ring, and, obtaining the lamp, he gets the palace and the princess back to their wonted places. Abanazar however follows Aladdin back to China, where it becomes apparent that in a contest of brains our hero hasn't a chance. A bit of old fashioned violence ("the old Kung-Fu") is the remedy, Abanazar is carried off by the Great Roc and all ends happily.

== Songs ==
- The spell
- Aladdin
- Hang-Chow
- The proclamation
- Tuang Kee Po
- It is written in the sands
- There and then
- Love's a luxury
- Dream about me
- Song of the genie of the ring
- Song of the genie of the lamp
- Chopsticks
- All I did
- Wicked
- The dirge
- Life in the laundry
- Give him the old kung fu

== See also ==
- Aladdin (TV special) - by Cole Porter
- Disney's Aladdin: A Musical Spectacular - a musical stage show based on the Disney animation
