= Sleights railway station =

Railway station in North Yorkshire, England

Sleights
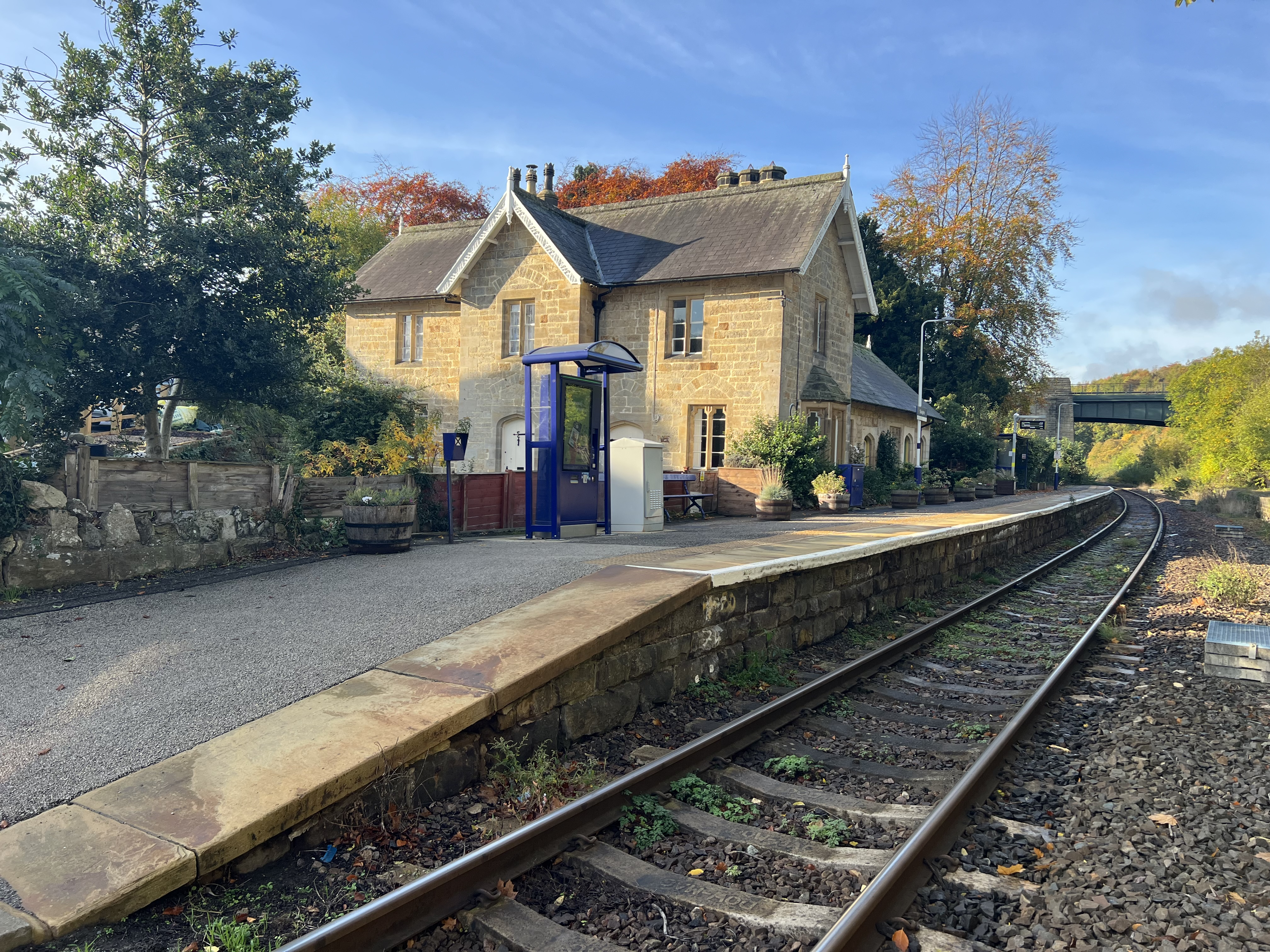

General information
- Location: Sleights, North Yorkshire; England
- Coordinates: 54°27′40″N 0°39′46″W
- Grid reference: NZ867081
- Owner: Network Rail
- Manager: Northern Trains
- Platforms: 1
- Tracks: 1

Other information
- Station code: SLH
- Classification: DfT category F2

History
- Original company: Whitby and Pickering Railway
- Pre-grouping: North Eastern Railway
- Post-grouping: London and North Eastern Railway; British Rail (North Eastern Region)

Key dates
- 8 June 1835: Opened

Passengers
- 2021/22: ▲4,696
- 2022/23: ▲5,048
- 2023/24: ▲6,844
- 2024/25: ▲6,848
- 2025/26: ▲8,768
Location
- Location within North Yorkshire
Notes
- Passenger statistics from the Office of Rail and Road

Sleights is a railway station on the Esk Valley Line, which runs between Middlesbrough and Whitby via Nunthorpe. The station, situated 2 miles 78 chains (4.8 km) south-west of Whitby, serves the villages of Briggswath and Sleights in North Yorkshire, England. It is owned by Network Rail and managed by Northern Trains.

== History ==
Sleights station was on the initial 6.5-mile (10.5 km) section of the Whitby and Pickering Railway between Whitby and Grosmont. Originally just a simple halt, it opened to horse-drawn traffic on 15 May 1835, with a full public service operating from June 1835. The station platforms and the main building, a mock-Tudor design by George Townsend Andrews, were constructed eleven years later and opened in 1846. The station buildings were extended along the platform in 1912.

The station used to have two platforms for up and down line working, but in common with the other stations between Grosmont and Whitby, this was reduced to single track working in 1984 when the second track was lifted and Sleights signal box closed. Trains now stop at the former Up line platform, where the main station buildings, including the station master's house, are now a Grade II-listed private residence. The former down platform used to have a wooden waiting shed and store; this building was recovered by the North Yorkshire Moors Railway and re-erected on the extended down platform at Grosmont.

Behind the down platform was a small goods yard with a single siding. The Up line platform is currently managed and maintained by Northern Trains and Esk Valley Railway, whilst the down platform and derelict signal box are the responsibility of Network Rail.

At one end of the platform, a footpath carries passengers over the River Esk to Briggswath on a small box girder bridge, while at the other the A169 towers over the railway and river on a bridge opened on 26 January 1937. The site of the modern day footpath used to be a level crossing carrying the main Whitby-Pickering road to a stone bridge over the Esk, before this was washed away during floods in 1930. Next to the crossing a 19th-century brick built signal box remains, now unused and boarded up.

== Services ==
As of December 2025, the station is served by six trains per day on Mondays to Saturdays and four on Sundays towards Whitby. Heading towards Middlesbrough via Nunthorpe, there are six trains per day on Mondays to Saturdays, with one continuing to Newcastle via Hartlepool, and four on Sundays, with two continuing to Darlington. All services are operated by Northern Trains.

Rolling stock used: Class 156 Super Sprinter and Class 158 Express Sprinter

Heritage trains from the North Yorkshire Moors Railway can be seen passing through Sleights Station, however they do not stop.

== Sources ==
- Bairstow, Martin (2008). Railways Around Whitby Volume One. Farsley: Bairstow. ISBN 978-1-871944-34-1.

| Preceding station | National Rail | Following station |
|---|---|---|
| Grosmont | Northern Trains; Esk Valley Line | Ruswarp |
