= Antony G. Sweeney =

British Arts manager

Antony Gerard "Tony" Sweeney
- Born: 25 September 1955 (age 71); Bradford, Yorkshire, England, UK
- Citizenship: Australian
- Education: Bachelor of Science (Hons.) in Physics and Electronics
- Alma mater: University of Southampton
- Occupation: Arts manager
- Spouse: Helen Richardson (died 2001)
- Children: 2
- Writing career
- Notable awards: Fellow of the Royal Society of Arts; Fellow of the Institute of Public Administration Australia

Antony Gerard Sweeney (25 September 1955) was born in Bradford, Yorkshire, England.

An Australian citizen, now resident in the UK, he is best known for his ten-year period as director of the Australian Centre for the Moving Image. He is a Fellow of the Royal Society of Arts in the UK and a Fellow of the Institute of Public Administration Australia.

== Early life ==
Sweeney was born in Bradford, Yorkshire, to Austin Joseph Sweeney and Anne-Marie (née Gresham) Sweeney. He attended St Bede's Grammar School (Bradford) and the University of Southampton.

He has a Bachelor of Science (Hons.) in Physics and Electronics from the University of Southampton. After his studies, he spent a year traveling, following the old Hippie trail through Asia.

== Career ==
On his return to the UK, Sweeney "drifted into publishing". He acted as commissioning editor in commercial book and journal publishing, initially at the Pergamon Press (Oxford) from 1979 to 1982, and then at Basil Blackwell Publishers (Oxford) from 1982 to 1988. He produced pioneering multimedia open-learning courses for the UK's Open College of the Arts, supported by television programs broadcast on Channel 4, from 1988 to 1991.

He was the deputy director of the National Museum of Photography, Film & Television (UK) from 1991 to 2004, and focused on developing the museum's brand profile and content strategies. He directed the museum's Imaging Frontiers masterplan re-development, which generated record visitor numbers and international critical acclaim. The museum is now seen as one of the leading international centres for culture and learning of its kind in the world.

Sweeney was appointed director and CEO of the Australian Centre for the Moving Image (ACMI) in 2005.

At the ACMI he oversaw record organisational growth, performance and visitation, and a prolonged period of sustained success and achievement. Having spent ten years in the role, Sweeney resigned in December 2014 to return to his family in Britain.
