= St Bede's and St Joseph's Catholic College =

Location
- Ignis: Cunliffe Road; Manningham; City of Bradford; West Yorkshire; BD8 7AP; Ardor: Highgate; Heaton; City of Bradford; West Yorkshire; BD9 4BQ; England; 53.8122°N 1.7657°W

Information
- Type: Academy
- Motto: Christus Lumen Gentium (Latin: Christ the Light of Nations)
- Religious affiliation: Roman Catholic
- Local authority: Bradford City Council
- Trust: Blessed Christopher Wharton Catholic Academy Trust
- Department for Education URN: 148520 Tables
- Ofsted: Reports
- Headteacher: Lawrence Bentley
- Gender: Coeducational
- Age: 11 to 19
- Enrolment: 1,861 as of December 2022
- Colours: Gold, blue, green and grey
- Website: sbsj.co.uk

St Bede's and St Joseph's Catholic College is a coeducational Roman Catholic secondary school and sixth form. It is located over two sites in the City of Bradford in the English county of West Yorkshire. The school was formed in September 2014 as a result of a merger between St Bede's Grammar School and St Joseph's Catholic College. It is currently the largest Catholic school in the UK.

== Description ==
The school is based over both of the former school sites with the new mixed gender Year 7 being based at the former St Joseph's site. Students who were attending either of the old schools prior to the merger remained in single sex education at the site they previously attended. The school is coeducational as of September 2018.

As of September 2018, the lower school (Years 7-9) is based at the old St Joseph's site and the upper school (Years 10-13) is based at the old St Bede's site.

The school has a coeducational sixth form, St Benedict's Sixth Form. All sixth form students are currently based at the old St Bede's site.

The old St Joseph's site has been renamed Ignis (Latin: spark) and the old St Bede's site has been renamed Ardor (Latin: flame).

At the start of September 2018, a house system was introduced, with 5 houses. The houses (Matthew, Mark, Luke, John and Paul) are each named after the 4 apostles who wrote the gospels, along with St Paul. With the house system are house days held at the end of each term. The house with the most house points wins the house cup. As of April 2019, Matthew and Paul and John have won the house cup (Matthew at House Day 1 and Paul at House Day 2 and St John won on transition day).

Previously a voluntary aided school administered by Bradford City Council, in September 2023 St Bede's and St Joseph's Catholic College converted to academy status. The school is now sponsored by the Blessed Christopher Wharton Catholic Academy Trust, but continues to be under the jurisdiction of the Roman Catholic Diocese of Leeds. The school is named after Saint Bede and Saint Joseph.
