= St John's Chapel, Sleights =

Ruined chapel in North Yorkshire, England

Coordinates: 54°27′13″N 0°40′33″W

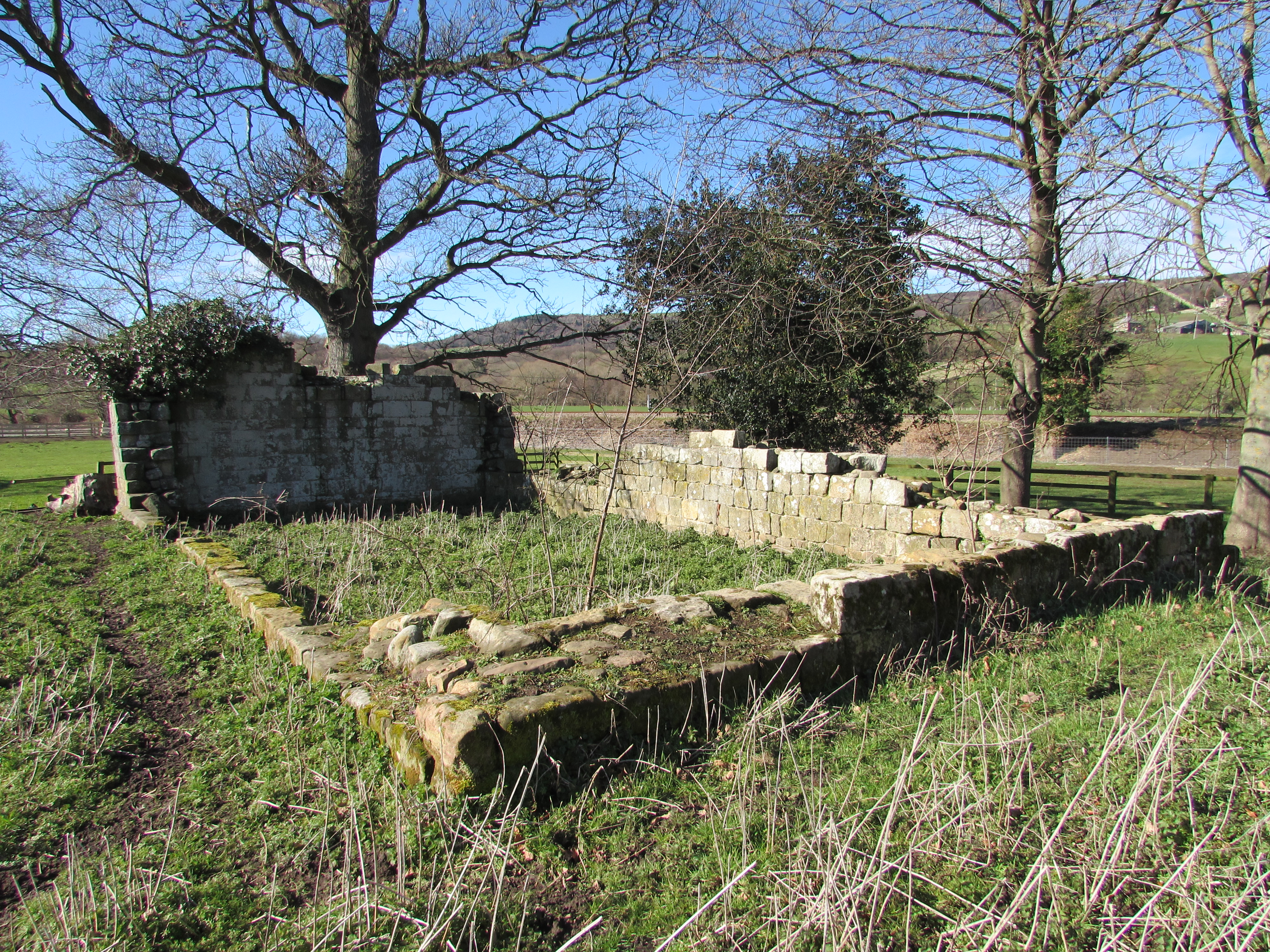
The ruined chapel, in 2019

St John's Chapel is a ruined Anglican chapel in Sleights, a village in North Yorkshire, in England.

The building was constructed in about 1260, as a chapel of ease to St Mary's Church, Whitby. It was commissioned by Roger, Abbot of Whitby. It lies on a hill above the village, which proved to be an inconvenient location for parishioners. The chapel remained in use until 1767, when St John's Church, Sleights was constructed closer to the village centre. In 1772, it had a thatched roof, a door and three blocked windows in the south wall, and a window in the west wall. The ruins were grade II listed in 1969.

The chapel ruins are of sandstone on a chamfered plinth, and consist of a continuous nave and chancel. The main surviving remnant is part of the west wall, containing the remains of a chamfered window opening, and the lower parts of the north and east walls. The building is roughly 40 feet (12 m) by 18 feet (5.5 m), and its walls are 2.5 feet (0.76 m) thick.

== See also ==
- Listed buildings in Eskdaleside cum Ugglebarnby
