= All Saints' Church, Ugglebarnby =

Church in North Yorkshire, England

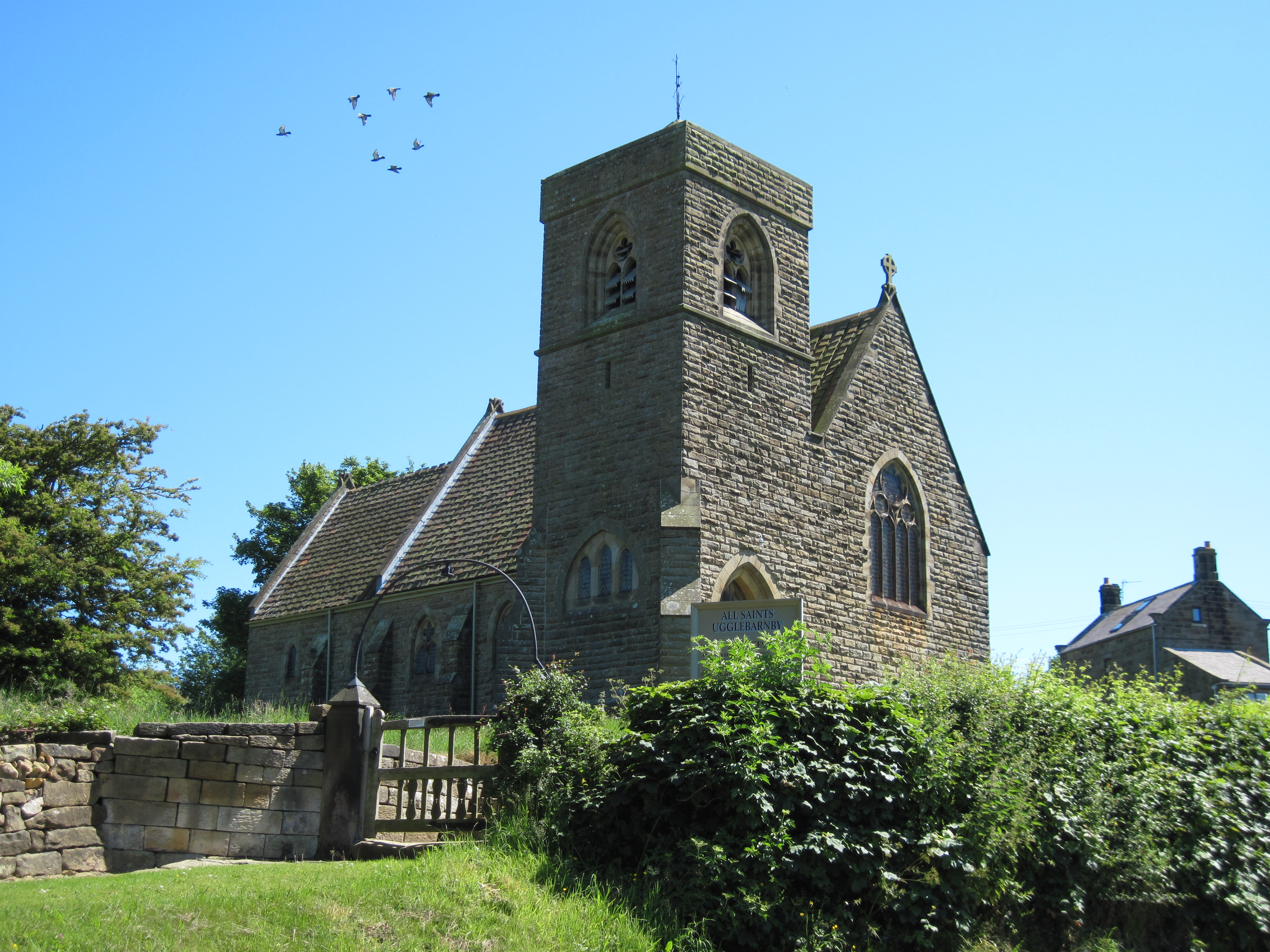
- The church, in 2009

- Location in North Yorkshire
- 54°27′08″N 0°38′40″W
- OS grid reference: NZ 87989 07148

All Saints' Church is an Anglican church in Ugglebarnby, a village in North Yorkshire, in England.

A chapel was constructed in Ugglebarnby in the 12th century. It is traditionally said to have been built in 1137, by Nicholas, Abbot of Whitby. The chapel was demolished in 1870 and a new church was completed in 1872, to a design by Charles Noel Armfield. It is broadly in the 14th-century Gothic style, but incorporates some stones from the old chapel. It was grade II listed in 1989.

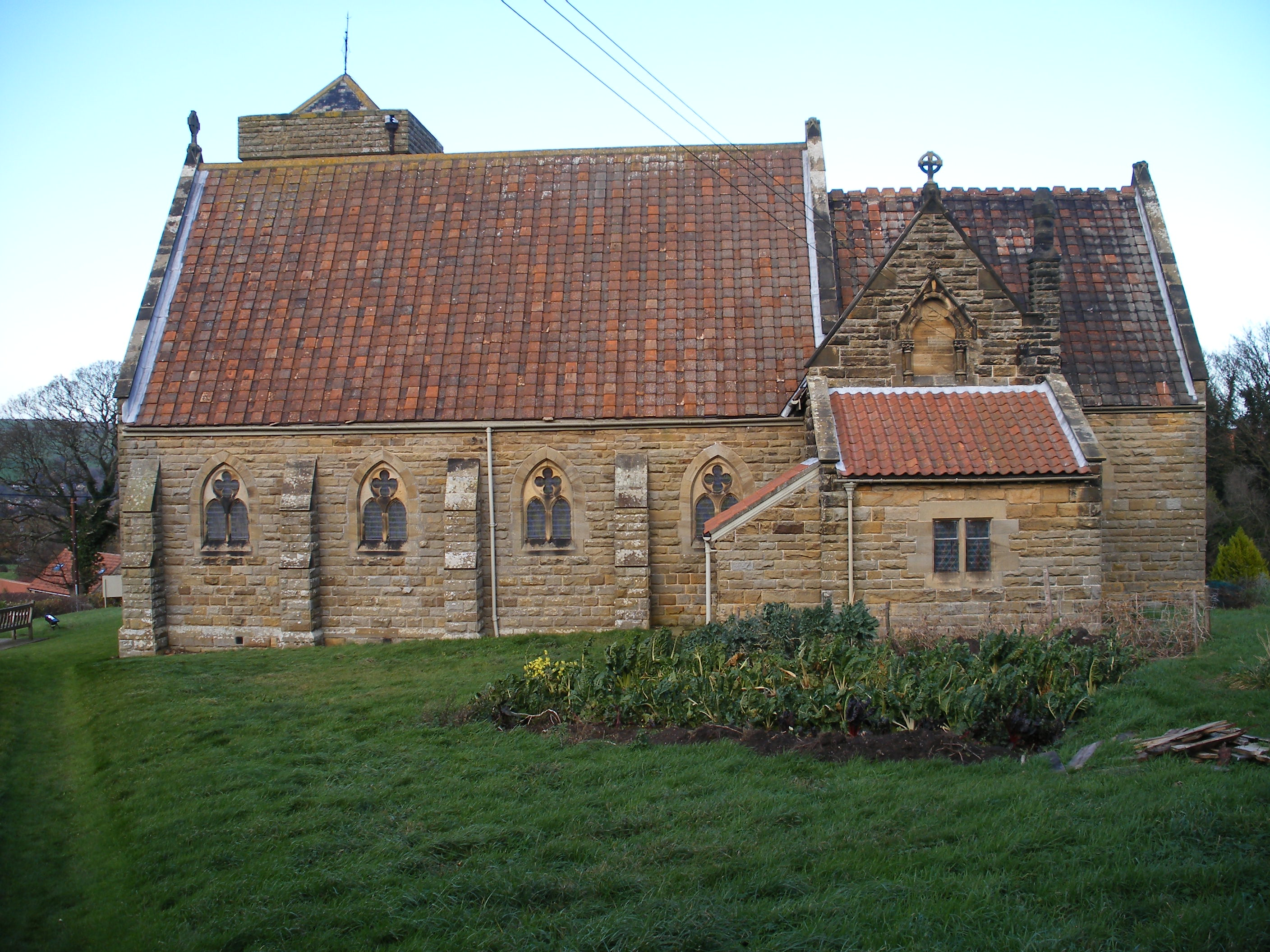
View from the north, in 2013

The church is built of cream and red brick banding, faced in sandstone, with a roof of tile and pantile. It consists of a nave, a chancel with a south organ chamber and vestry, and a northwest tower. The tower has two stages, diagonal buttresses, a west doorway with a double-chamfered surround, a north window of three stepped lancets, two-light bell openings with pointed arches, a chamfered parapet band, and a plain parapet. Below the east window is a re-set carved stone.

Inside the church is a stone reredos depicting the Last Supper, carved by Matthew Noble. There is a highly decorative carved pulpit and lectern, and a stone font, with an octagonal timber cover. There are carved pews, a brass altar rail depicting heraldic beasts, and a hammerbeam roof. There is much stained glass, described by Historic England as "pretty but unremarkable".

== See also ==
- Listed buildings in Eskdaleside cum Ugglebarnby
