= Roly Gregoire =

English footballer

Personal information
- Full name: Roland Barry Gregoire
- Date of birth: 23 November 1958 (age 67)
- Place of birth: Liverpool, England
- Position: Striker

Youth career
- Halifax Town

Senior career*
Years	Team	Apps	(Gls)
1977–1978	Halifax Town	5	(0)
1978–1980	Sunderland	9	(1)
Total		14	(1)
- * Club domestic league appearances and goals

Roland Barry Gregoire (born 23 November 1958) is an English former professional footballer who played as a striker.

== Early and personal life ==
Gregoire was born in Toxteth, Liverpool to Dominican parents, who had been part of the Windrush generation. He grew up in Bradford, and was educated at St Bede's Grammar School.

== Career ==
He began his career with Halifax Town, making five league appearances in the 1977–78 season. Gregoire moved to Sunderland for £5,000 in January 1978, becoming the first black player to play for them. Whilst playing for Halifax reserves, Gregoire scored a hat-trick against Sunderland reserves to prompt Sunderland manager Jimmy Adamson into signing him. He made his debut for Sunderland against Hull City due to injuries to other first team strikers. Gregoire spent two seasons with Sunderland — scoring one goal in nine league appearances — before retiring in 1980 due to injury.

In May 2026, Gregoire told BBC Look North that he suffered so much racism that he had not been able to talk about it publicly for 46 years. It also put him off watching football for a long time.

== Later life ==
After leaving football, he lived and worked in London. When living in Dominica he became a Rastafarian, taking the name Jabari Muata Ta Seti. He returned to Bradford and worked as a voluntary counsellor, also setting up the anti-drugs charity Black Against Crack in the mid-1990s.
