= Briggswath =

Village in North Yorkshire, England

Coordinates: 54.46°N 0.67°W

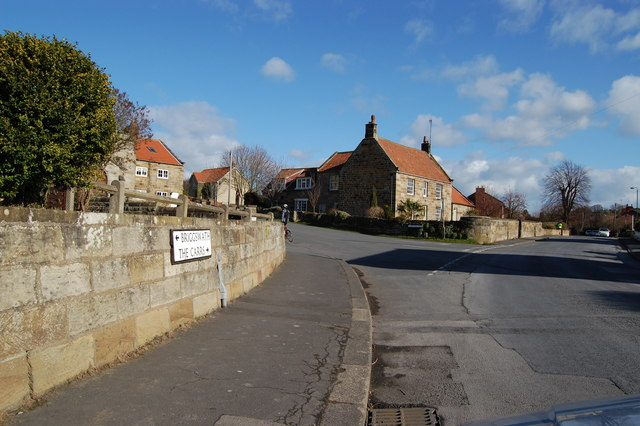
- Briggswath on the north bank of the River Esk

- Location within North Yorkshire
- OS grid reference: NZ8608
- Unitary authority: North Yorkshire
- Ceremonial county: North Yorkshire
- Region: Yorkshire and the Humber
- Country: England
- Sovereign state: United Kingdom
- Post town: WHITBY
- Postcode district: YO21
- Police: North Yorkshire
- Fire: North Yorkshire
- Ambulance: Yorkshire
- UK Parliament: Scarborough and Whitby

Briggswath is a village in the county of North Yorkshire, England. The settlement is on the north bank of the River Esk, upstream of Ruswarp, and opposite Sleights, which is on the south bank.

== History ==
The name Briggswath is first recorded in 1230 as Briggwath, meaning bridge-ford, as it is next to an old bridge which crossed the River Esk over to Sleights. The village is 1-mile (1.6 km) upriver from Ruswarp at the site of the Medieval bridge from which it takes its name, and 2 miles (3.2 km) south of Whitby. The bridge was known as Sleights Bridge, and was replaced as the main road bridge by one further upstream in 1937. A great flood in July 1930 swept away the old road bridge.

Historically, the village was in the civil parish of Aislaby and part of the wapentake of Whitby Strand. It is now in the civil parish of Eskdaleside cum Ugglebarnby. From 1974 to 2023 it was part of the Borough of Scarborough. It is now administered by the unitary North Yorkshire Council. The village is represented at Parliament as part of the Scarborough and Whitby constituency.

Just west of the village was the site of an ironstone mine (known as Sleights Bridge). It was worked between 1856 and 1859, producing on average 3,500 tonnes (3,900 tons) of iron ore each year.

The village has the A169 to the west, and the B1410 and the River Esk to the south. The River Esk sometimes floods the B1410 closing it to traffic, and the nearby Briggswath measuring station on the Esk recorded an all time high of 13 feet (4 m) on the river in June 1999.

The Wesleyan chapel in the village was first built in 1820 (though the present structure dates from 1905), and includes a roll of ten local men who died in the First World War.

The village has an hourly bus service on average, with most being a local bus around the Whitby and Ruswarp area, with some services consisting of the longer-distance 840 Coastliner service to Leeds.

== See also ==
- Listed buildings in Eskdaleside cum Ugglebarnby
