= St Joseph's Catholic College, Bradford =

School in Manningham, Bradford, West Yorkshire, England

St Joseph's Catholic College
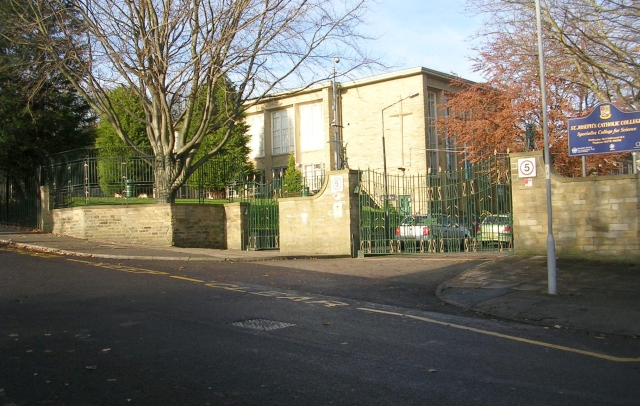

Location
- Cunliffe Road; Manningham; Bradford, West Yorkshire, BD8 7AP; England; 53.812057°N 1.765675°W

Information
- Motto: Per Crucem ad Lucem (Latin: Through the Cross to the Light)
- Religious affiliation: Roman Catholic
- Established: 1908
- Closed: 2014
- Local authority: City of Bradford
- Department for Education URN: 107429 Tables
- Ofsted: Reports
- Executive Headteacher: P. Heitzman
- Headteacher: C. O'Donnell
- Staff: 69
- Gender: Girls and boys
- Age: 11 to 16
- Enrolment: approx. 1,000
- Colours: grey, green, blue and white
- School hymn: In God Alone
- Sixth form: St Benedict's Sixth Form
- Website: http://www.stjcc.co.uk/

St Joseph's Catholic College was a state Roman Catholic Girls' school situated in Manningham, close to Bradford city centre in West Yorkshire, England. The school merged with St. Bede's Grammar School in September 2014 to form St Bede's and St Joseph's Catholic College.

== School history ==
The college was founded by the Order of the Sisters of the Cross and Passion in 1908. It was a direct grant grammar school until 1977 when it became a Voluntary Aided 13–19 Girls' School under the trusteeship of the Diocese of Leeds, which owns the buildings and grounds, and appoints the majority of the Governors. In 1995 due to Bradford Catholic re-organisation the College became an 11–19 Catholic Girls' School.

The college's first headmistress from 1908–1916 was Mother Gonzaga. From 1916–1956 the headmistress was Mother Sister Mary Immaculate (born ca. 1890 – died 1977), Yorkshire Women of the Century, educationalist, overseeing St Joseph’s to become one of the major Catholic girls' grammar schools in the country. The college's motto was "Per Crucem ad Lucem" – Through the Cross to the Light.

From 2008 the school had a federated governing body with St. Bede's Grammar School and Yorkshire Martyrs Catholic College. When Yorkshire Martyrs closed in 2010 the girls transferred to St Joseph's.

The school merged with St. Bede's Grammar School in September 2014 to form St Bede's and St Joseph's Catholic College. The former St. Joseph's is now used as the lower school site of the new school.

== Sixth Form ==
St Joseph's shared an associated sixth form with St. Bede's Grammar School for many years. In 2008 the sixth forms of St Bede's and St Joseph's joined with the sixth form of Yorkshire Martyrs Catholic College to form the Bradford Catholic Sixth Form. When Yorkshire Martyrs closed in 2010 the sixth form transferred to St Bede's and St Joseph's and in 2011 the Sixth Form was renamed St Benedict's Sixth Form.

== Notable former Joseph's girls ==
- Heather Peace — actress and singer
- Rachel Leskovac — actress
- Sophie McShera — actress who played Daisy Mason the kitchen maid in Downton Abbey
- Elizabeth Stratford — composer
- Steph Swainston — author
- Alannah Halay — composer and author.

=== Direct-grant grammar school ===
- Kathryn Apanowicz — actress and TV presenter, the long-term partner of the late Richard Whiteley
- Kathleen Baxter — English women's rights activist
- Jane Ellison — Conservative MP for Battersea from 2010–17
- Bronwyn Hill — British civil servant, currently serving as the Permanent Secretary since 2011 of the Department for Environment, Food and Rural Affairs
- Anita Lonsbrough — winner of the women's 200m breaststroke at the 1960 Rome Olympics
- Linda McAvan — Labour MEP 1999–2019 for Yorkshire and the Humber, and from 1994–99 for Yorkshire South
- Diana Warwick — general secretary from 1983–1993 of the Association of University Teachers (AUT), chief executive from 1995–2009 of Universities UK, chairperson from 2010–2014 of the Human Tissue Authority (HTA)
