= Martin McEvoy =

English opera singer (born 1951)

- Born: 21 April 1951
- Occupations: Opera singer, broadcaster

Martin McEvoy (born 21 April 1951) is an English opera singer, producer, presenter and broadcaster. He has specialised in playing light baritone roles in opera and operetta especially those in the Gilbert & Sullivan repertoire. He broadcasts regularly on BBC Radio. McEvoy is the founder and artistic director of Crystal Clear Opera, London City Opera and Martin McEvoy Productions.

== Early life and education ==
As a young boy he attended the Northern Theatre School, St Blaise School and St. Bede's Grammar School, Bradford. He played Young MacDuff in the West Riding Youth Theatre production of Macbeth with John Duttine in the title role and he also appeared with many local amateur societies. McEvoy was awarded the York Scholarship to study singing at the Royal College of Music, London. His vocal teacher at The RCM was the Welsh operatic baritone Redvers Llewellyn. Having finished his studies at the RCM Opera School he won the Ralph Vaughan Williams scholarship for further study at the Cologne University of Music with the German baritone Josef Metternich.

== Opera ==
On his return from Germany McEvoy joined the English Opera Group, performing in Benjamin Britten's church parables at Snape Maltings. His first operatic roles were with The English Music Theatre Company under the direction of Colin Graham. His roles included Papageno in The Magic Flute, Lysander in The Fairy Queen, the Narrator in the first British performance of Britten's Paul Bunyan and Filch in The Threepenny Opera. For Opera North in Leeds, he sang the role of the Gendarme in Les mamelles de Tiresias by Poulenc and he also took part in the Opera North outreach programme taking opera to schools in Yorkshire. For New Sadler's Wells Opera McEvoy sang Baron Schupan in Countess Maritza, Armand Brissard in The Count of Luxembourg, Robin Oakapple in Ruddigore, Giuseppe in The Gondoliers and Ko-Ko in The Mikado. His concert work in the United Kingdom has taken him to the Queen Elizabeth Hall, Royal Festival Hall, Barbican Hall and Royal Albert Hall in London; the Usher Hall, Edinburgh; St George's Hall, Bradford; and the Grand Hall of Scarborough Spa.

=== Radio and film work ===
McEvoy broadcasts regularly on the BBC Radio 2 programme Friday Night is Music Night and was also a guest on Melodies for You hosted by David Jacobs. Also for BBC Radio 2 he sang Ko-Ko in The Mikado and also appeared in Richard Baker's Grand Tour To Melody from the BBC Radio Theatre also with Richard Baker he broadcast "Arthur Sullivan Returns to Earth" BBC Radio 3 relays include Tarara in Utopia, Limited, Paul Bunyan and The Fairy Queen from Sadler's Wells Theatre and Lady in The Dark from the Edinburgh Festival. For Opera Rara he was in the recording of Orazi e Curiazi by Mercadante As a radio presenter McEvoy has devised, written and presented several programmes for BBC Radio Cambridgeshire and BBC Radio Northampton, including Music With a Passion a compilation of rock and opera, Music From The Movies and My Favourite Things. He was a contributor on Cambridgeshire Calling a weekly arts show. He was also a contributor on The Giles Brandreth Show for LBC.

McEvoy is also on the original cast recording of Alladin by Sandy Wilson He re-created the roles he played in Death in Venice at the Royal Opera House, Covent Garden in the film version of the opera which was directed by Tony Palmer and he was also in the film of the Visconti production of Don Carlo from The Royal Opera House, Covent Garden.

=== Crystal Clear Opera ===
Martin McEvoy is the founder and Artistic Director of Crystal Clear Opera. The mission statement of CCO was to make opera available, affordable, accessible and understandable to all. Crystal Clear Opera toured throughout the UK and in recognition of its work in 1992 the company was awarded an Opera Project Touring Grant for three years by the Arts Council of England. Crystal Clear Opera toured throughout the UK with productions of The Marriage of Figaro, Madam Butterfly, La Boheme, Die Fledermaus, La Traviata, Carmen, Don Pasquale and Tosca.

=== London City Opera ===
London City Opera was formed by McEvoy in 1994. The company presented a new production of La Bohème on a floating stage at Portomaso Malta conducted by Roderick Brydon and designed by Joanne Lister. With The Brandenburg Sinfonia LCO recorded its first C.D. Love Unspoken. LCO also promoted two Christmas seasons at The Queen Elizabeth Hall on the South Bank with La Boheme and Die Fledermaus. LCO also presented a four-day opera festival in the grounds of the company's headquarters at The Old Rectory, Grafham, Cambridgeshire.

=== Martin McEvoy productions ===
McEvoy devised and presented a series of Summer Gala Concerts at The Spa Grand Hall Scarborough. Productions ranged from Opera, Operetta and light classical to jazz and 60s rock. Artists included Lesley Garrett, Richard Baker, David Jacobs, Moira Anderson, The Halle Orchestra, The Northern Sinfonia, Acker Bilk, Kenny Ball, Cleo Laine and Johnny Dankworth. During the Scarborough season the company also presented two co-production broadcasts with BBC Radio 2, Friday Night is Music Night and David Jacobs in My Music. McEvoy also devised and promoted a national tour for Lesley Garrett called The Soprano in Red.

In 1994 McEvoy acted as casting director on a new-style opera album with the Royal Philharmonic Orchestra. The two CD album Simply Opera was a compilation of some of the world's best-known operas with specially composed linking material.

== Personal life ==
McEvoy now lives on the borders of Rutland and Northamptonshire with his partner the artist Joanne Lister.
