= St John's Church, Sleights =

Church in North Yorkshire, England

Coordinates: 54°27′01″N 0°39′54″W

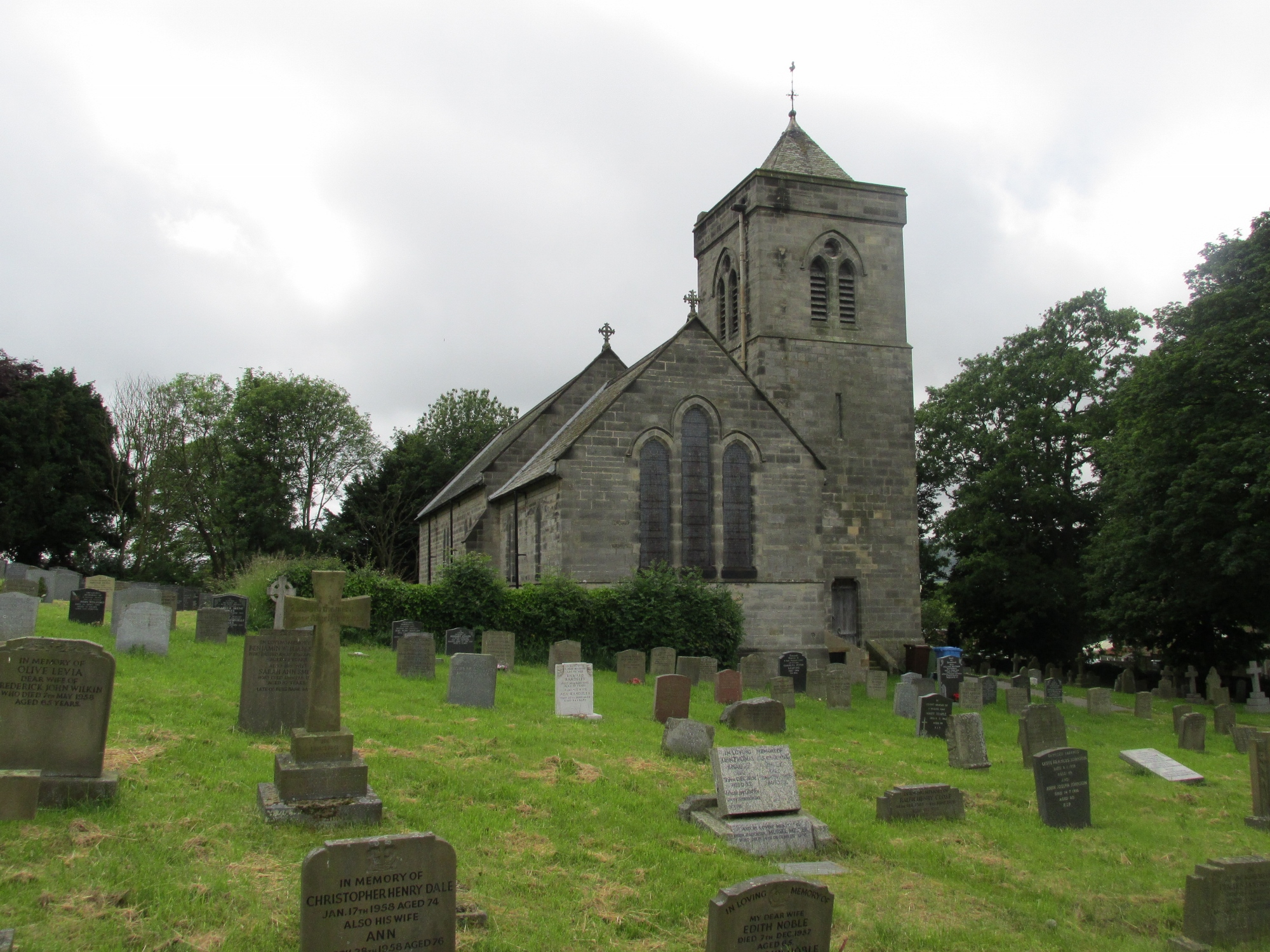
The church, in 2014

St John's Church is an Anglican church in Sleights, a village in North Yorkshire, in England.

The mediaeval St John's Chapel, Sleights, was replaced by a new building, further down the hill, in 1767. In 1848, it was described as a "very elegant structure". However, the Georgian church was demolished and replaced with a new building, which was consecrated on 20 September 1895. The church was designed by Ewan Christian in the Early English style. It was grade II listed in 2005.

The church is built of Grosmont sandstone, with a roof of Westmorland slate. It consists of a nave, a north aisle, a north transept, a chancel, and a northeast tower with a plain parapet and a pyramidal roof. The windows are lancets, and the east window is a stepped tripled lancet. The stained glass was designed by Charles Eamer Kempe. Inside, there is a hammerbeam roof, oak panelling to the lower parts of the walls, and an oak reredos and altar.

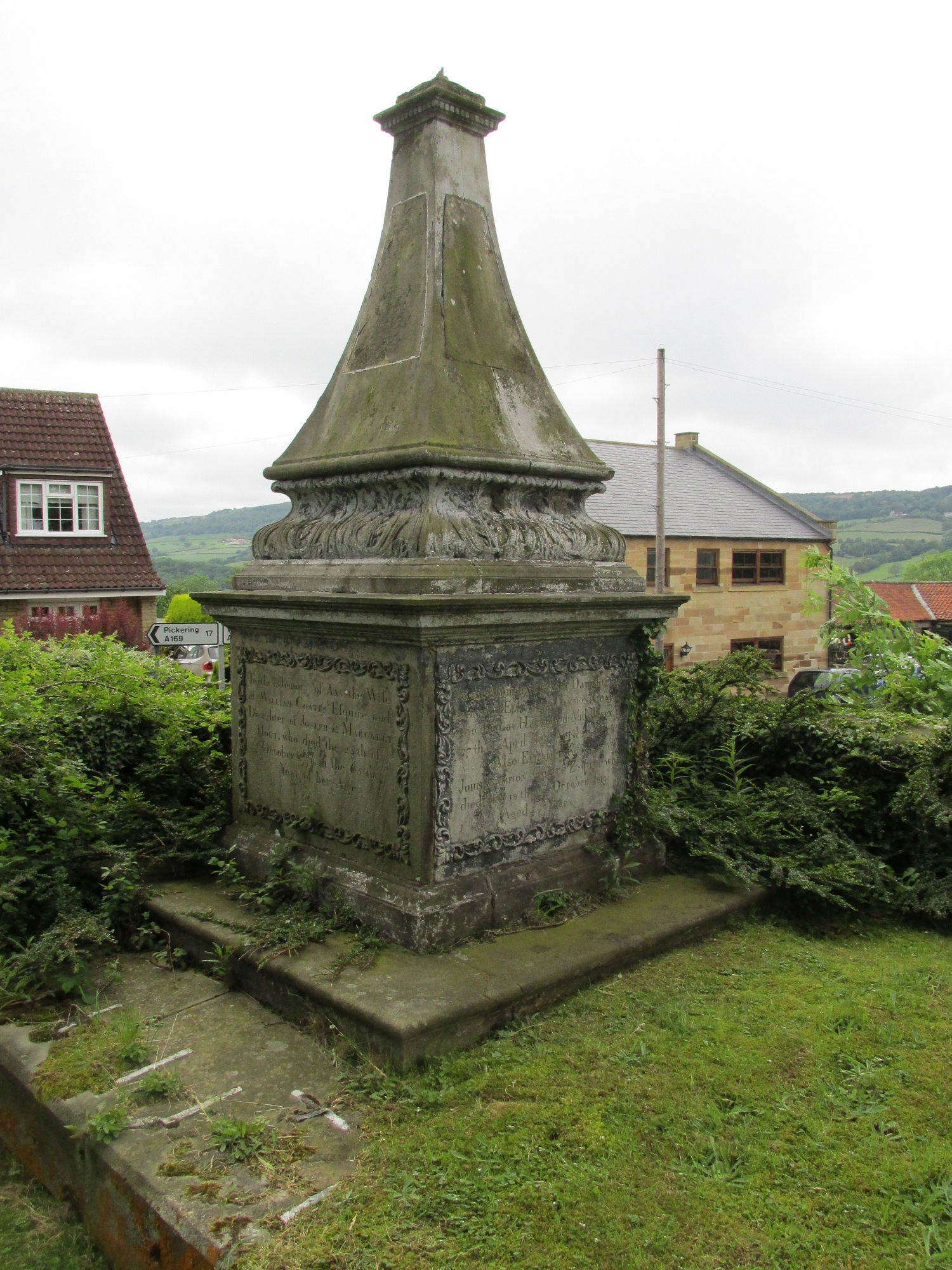
The Coates Memorial

In the churchyard is the grade II listed Coates Memorial, commemorating members of the Coates family. It constructed of sandstone with a square plan, and consists of a concave obelisk, standing on a moulded base decorated with acanthus. On the sides are memorial panels surrounded by rinceaux in low relief.

== See also ==
- Listed buildings in Eskdaleside cum Ugglebarnby
