= Stephen Murgatroyd =

Author, academic and broadcaster

Stephen John Murgatroyd
- Born: 31 October 1950 (age 75); Bradford, Yorkshire, England
- Occupations: writer and consultant

Stephen John Murgatroyd (born 31 October 1950, Bradford, Yorkshire, England) is a writer, broadcaster and consultant.

Murgatroyd was educated at St. Bede's Grammar School and University College Cardiff, where in 1972 he graduated with honors with a bachelor of arts in research methodology. After graduating, he became a special needs teacher in Cwmbran, Wales. He also became a tutor with the Open University of the United Kingdom.

A year later he became a full-time research fellow with the Open University, directing its first major longitudinal study of adult learners. He later became senior counsellor at the Open University in Wales.

In 1983 he received a master's of philosophy from the Open University of the UK. It was around this time that Murgatroyd became associate editor of the British Journal of Guidance and Counselling and a founding board member of the British Psychological Society's Counseling Psychology section – all of which earned him a fellowship in the British Psychological Society in 1985. He earned his doctorate in 1987, also from the Open University.

In 1986, Murgatroyd became a dean at Athabasca University. Later, he became the first executive director of the Centre for Innovative Management, home of the world's first on-line executive MBA – a programme he managed from 1993 to 1997. This work resulted in an honorary doctorate in "e-learning" from Athabasca University in 2000.

In 1998 he left the Athabasca to join Axia NetMedia, where he helped develop a non-profit master's degree programme offered in association with Middlesex University, where he is a visiting professor.

He returned to Athabasca University in 2003, where he was executive director for external relations until May 2005. He is now Chief Scout of the Innovation Expedition and Principal of Murgatroyd Communications & Consulting Inc. He works with governments, companies and not for profit organizations.

He has written and published 25 books (including two bibliographies), three pamphlets, 30 chapters in edited works, 49 peer reviewed papers in academic journals, 44 contributions to journals and magazines (including reviews) and [twenty, fifty five] journalistic pieces in newspapers and magazines since 1972.

He was elected a Fellow of the Royal Society for the encouragement of Arts, Manufactures and Commerce (RSA) (UK) in 2009.

He has been active in the non-profit sector, as a former board member of the Galileo Educational Network, trustee of the Alberta Heritage Community Foundation, Chair of the Human Resources Committee of Alberta Ballet and one of the founders of the Alberta Council of Technologies. He currently serves as a Director of Energy Futures Network.

He is married with two adult sons and currently lives in Edmonton, Alberta, Canada.

== Bibliography ==
- Total Quality Management in the Public Sector, with Colin Morgan (Open University Press, 1994)
- Murgatroyd, Stephen (1999). Staying Healthy at Work. Gower. ISBN 0-566-08144-X.
