= Sleights =

Village in North Yorkshire, England

Coordinates: 54°27′19″N 0°39′44″W

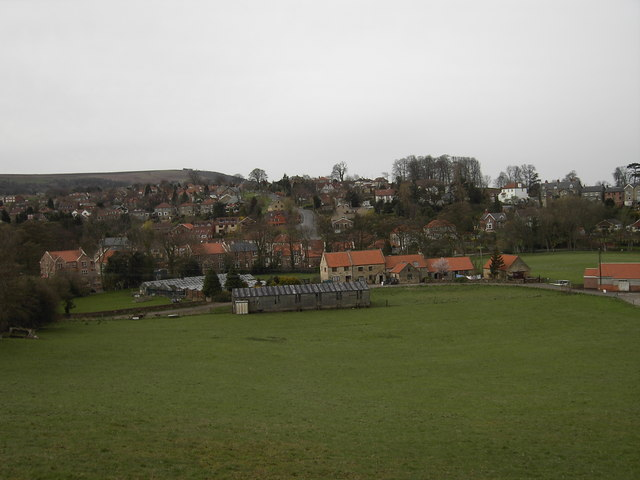
- Sleights Sports Ground (top right) with the village behind

- Location within North Yorkshire
- OS grid reference: NZ868069
- Civil parish: Eskdaleside cum Ugglebarnby
- Unitary authority: North Yorkshire
- Ceremonial county: North Yorkshire
- Region: Yorkshire and the Humber
- Country: England
- Sovereign state: United Kingdom
- Post town: WHITBY
- Postcode district: YO22
- Dialling code: 01947
- Police: North Yorkshire
- Fire: North Yorkshire
- Ambulance: Yorkshire
- UK Parliament: Scarborough and Whitby

Sleights (/ˈslaɪts/ SLITES) is a village in North Yorkshire, England. Located in the Esk Valley to the south-west of Whitby, the village is part of the civil parish of Eskdaleside cum Ugglebarnby. Sleights lies along the steep main A169 road that runs north to south between Whitby and Malton via Pickering across the North York Moors.

At the bottom of the village, the road crosses the Esk Valley Railway, allowing access to Sleights railway station. The road crosses the River Esk on a high bridge, opened on 26 January 1937. The road continues up the hill to reach the A171 Whitby to Middlesbrough trunk road. At the top of the village is Blue Bank. Due east of the village is the hamlet of Iburndale.

Due to road accidents, Blue Bank, with a gradient of 1 in 4 (25%), has an escape lane of soft sand.

From 1974 to 2023, Sleights was part of the Borough of Scarborough. It is now administered by the unitary North Yorkshire Council.

The Horticultural & Industrial Society show has been held each year since 1880. Since 2006 the show has been held on the sports field, with classes for produce, fruit, flowers vegetables, crafts, cake decorating, photography, flower arranging etc. Additional attractions include a bouncy castle, face painting, tombola and a fun dog show. The infamous Victorian forger Edward Simpson was born here in 1815.

== Amenities ==
There is a village shop, a branch of the Spar chain which includes a Post Office, two public houses, a butchers, Botham's bakers and a fish and chip restaurant.

== Sport ==
The village sports field, which is mainly used for cricket, has a new pavilion built in 2006. The money for the new build was collected through local fundraising. Until 2018, the cricket team used to play in the Eskdale League on Saturdays. In June 2011, a new Sleights Football club was formed and joined the Scarborough and District Saturday League, with several players coming from Sleights, but training and playing at Caedmon School in Whitby. They were promoted from the league's Third Division to the First in the space of two seasons. They joined the Beckett Football League in 2017 and returned to play at Lowdale Lane in the village after a 20-year absence on Saturday 23 September 2018. Their first game back home was a 4–1 win over Kirkbymoorside Reserves, Joe Hugill scored the first goal. There is also a bowls club which is used by people from Sleights and neighbouring towns and villages.

== Education ==
The village contains only one school, Sleights Church of England primary school. The school has approximately 100 pupils and is graded as Good by Ofsted and SIAMS (2019). Students aged over 11 years old travel to nearby schools in Whitby.

== Religion ==
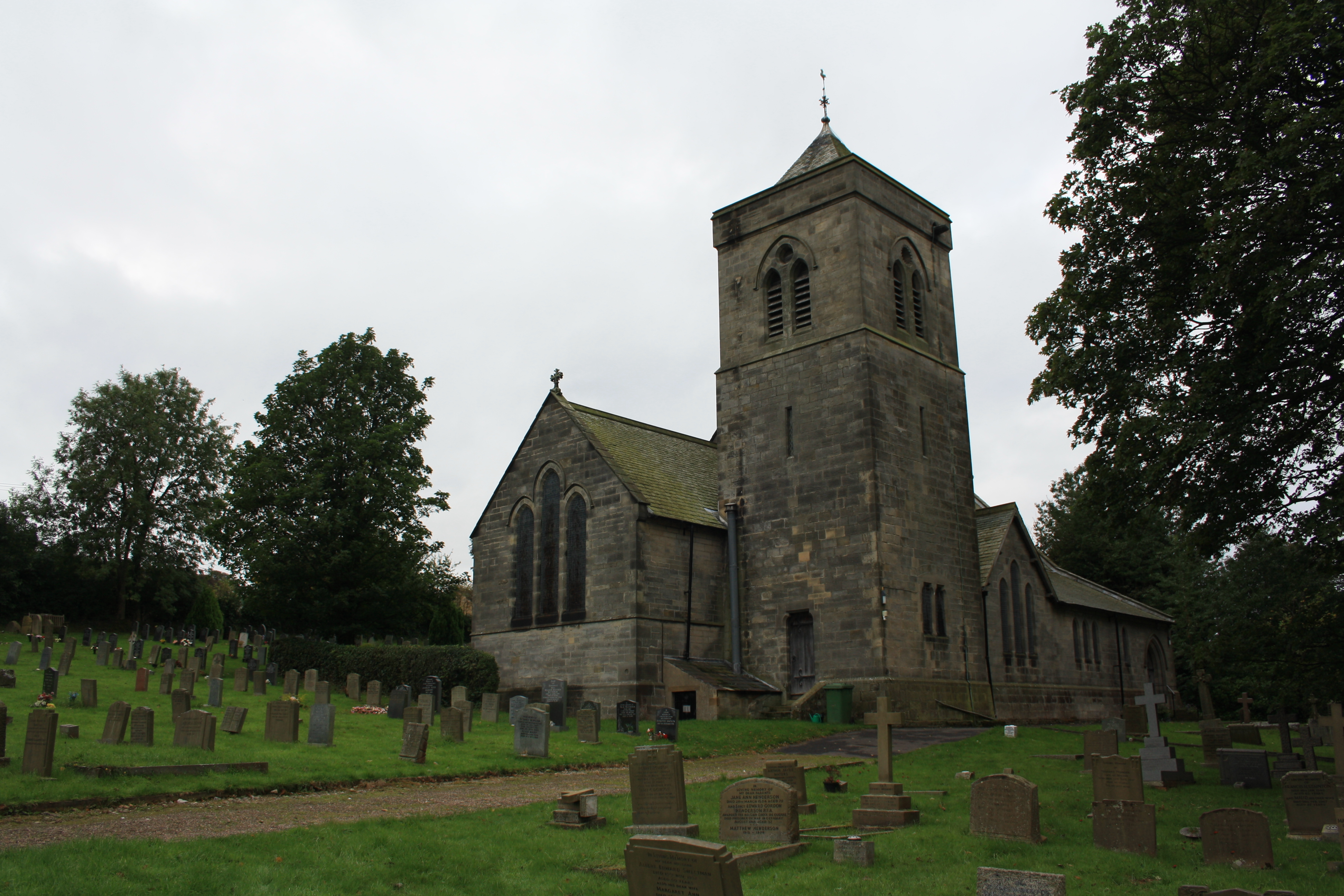
St John's Church

There are three places of worship in the village: the Anglican St John's Church, Sleights, English Martyrs Roman Catholic Church, on Eskdaleside and, at the bottom of the village, the Briggswath and Sleights Methodist Chapel. The churchyard of St John's is the burial place for all denominations in the parish. The author Alfred J. Brown and his wife are buried there. The ruins of the mediaeval St John's Chapel, Sleights lie above the village.

== Name ==
First found in a document from 1223 as Sleghtesc. Like other place names in Yorkshire, the etymology of Sleights is Old Norse. It means 'smooth or level fields' from slétta 'flat land, plain, prairie', like the Norman place name Eslettes (Esletis ab. 1040), same etymology as many places in Denmark called Sletten.

== See also ==
- Listed buildings in Eskdaleside cum Ugglebarnby
