= Stepan Lucyszyn =

British engineer, inventor and technologist

Stepan Lucyszyn FREng FIEEE
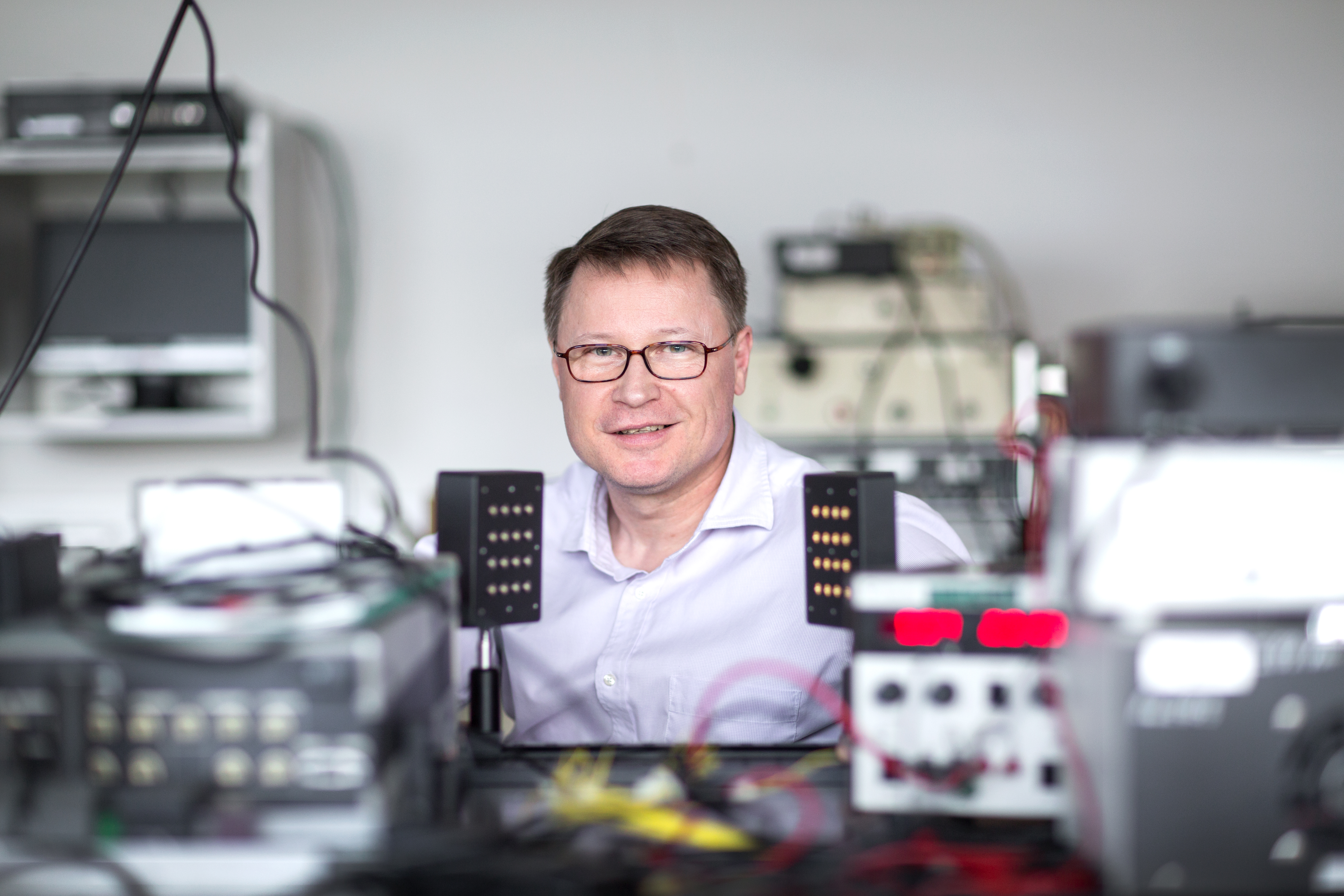

Professor of Millimetre-wave Systems, Imperial College London
- Incumbent
- Assumed office 2016

Personal details

Stepan Lucyszyn is a British engineer, inventor and technologist, and has been a Professor of Millimetre-wave Systems at Imperial College London, England, since 2016. He was elevated to Fellow of the Institute of Electrical and Electronics Engineers (IEEE) in 2014 and elected to Fellow of the Royal Academy of Engineering](RAEng) in 2023. Lucyszyn's research has mainly focused on monolithic microwave integrated circuits (MMICs), radio frequency microelectromechanical systems (RF MEMS), wireless power transfer (WPT), thermal infrared technologies ('THz Torch') and additive manufacturing (3D Printing).

== Education ==
- 1987 B.Sc.(Hons) in Electronic & Communication Engineering, Polytechnic of North London
- 1988 M.Sc. in Satellite Communication Engineering, University of Surrey
- 1993 Ph.D. in Electronic Engineering, University of London (King's College)
- 2010 D.Sc. in Millimetre-wave and Terahertz Electronics, Imperial College London

== Biography ==
For a brief time, Lucyszyn worked in industry, as a satellite systems engineer for maritime and military communications. In 1994, he registered with the Engineering Council as a qualified chartered engineer.

Lucyszyn spent 12 years researching microwave and (sub-)millimetre-wave RFICs/MMICs. He co-edited a book entitled RFIC and MMIC Design and Technology, published by the Institution of Electrical Engineers (IEE, now the IET) in 2001. This book was translated into Chinese in 2007. For his contributions to RFICs/MMICs, he was made an adjunct professor at the University of Electronic Science and Technology of China (Chengdu, China) in 2008.

In 2001, Lucyszyn started working on RF MEMS. In 2004, he published a review paper on RF MEMS technology, which won an IEE Premium Award in 2005. He edited the book entitled Advanced RF MEMS, published by Cambridge University Press in 2010. For his contributions to RF MEMS, he was made a guest professor at Tsinghua University (Beijing, China) in 2008.

Lucyszyn first starting working on millimetre-wave and terahertz technologies in 1992 and 1996, respectively. In 2010, he was awarded the DSc degree (higher doctorate) of Imperial College London for his contributions to Millimetre-wave and Terahertz Electronics. In 2011, he introduced the concept and has since been pioneering "over the THz horizon" thermal infrared 'THz Torch' technologies. In 2012, he co-founded the cross-disciplinary Centre for Terahertz Science and Engineering at Imperial College London and was co-director until 2019.

In recent years, Lucyszyn has concentrated his research activities on building-edge additive manufacturing for next generation microwave, millimetre-wave and terahertz applications. For his contributions to passive component technologies, he was made a visiting professor at Tohoku University (Sendai, Japan) in 2019. In 2022, for their work on 3D printing, Lucyszyn and his team at Imperial College London won Junkosha's inaugural Technology Innovator of the Year Award for the Microwave and Millimeter Wave category.

Lucyszyn has (co-)authored well over 200 papers and 12 book chapters in applied physics and engineering. He served as Editor-in-Chief for the International Journal of Electronics (2002-2006) and Associate Editor for the Journal of Microelectromechanical Systems (2005-2009). In 2011, Lucyszyn chaired the 41st European Microwave Conference (EuMC).

Lucyszyn was an External Examiner at the University of Leeds (2009-2013) and University College Cork (2017-2021) for their undergraduate degree programmes in Electrical and Electronic Engineering. Lucyszyn was made an IEEE Distinguished Microwave Lecturer (DML) (2010-1012) and a EuMA European Microwave Lecturer (EML) (2013).

He was made a Fellow of the Institute of Physics (UK, 2005), Fellow of the Institution of Electrical Engineers (UK, 2005) and Fellow of The Electromagnetics Academy (USA, 2008). Lucyszyn was elevated to Fellow of the Institute of Electrical and Electronics Engineers (USA, 2014) 'for contributions to monolithic microwave integrated circuits and radio frequency microelectromechanical systems'. Lucyszyn was elected to Fellow of the Royal Academy of Engineering (UK, 2023).

In 2004, Lucyszyn was interviewed on the TV programme 'Click Online', by BBC reporter Spencer Kelly, for his views on fire risks associated with mobile phones. In 2013, Lucyszyn was selected to take part in the Royal Society Pairing Scheme's ‘Week in Westminster’, where he was partnered with the Head of Chief Scientific Advisers (CSAs) Partnership Team at the Government Office for Science (GO-Science). In 2014, Lucyszyn travelled to a minefield in Croatia with legendary Manchester United and England footballer Bobby Charlton (founder of the Find A Better Way (FABW) charity) to investigate new technologies for landmine detection.

In 2014, with Lord (Paul Rudd) Drayson, he co-founded the Imperial College London spin-out company Drayson Wireless Ltd. (renamed 'Drayson Technologies Ltd' in 2015), being a co-inventor in two patent families associated with radiative and inductive wireless power transfer.

== Books ==
- I. D. Robertson and S. Lucyszyn (Editors), RFIC and MMIC Design and Technology, 562-page hardback, English Version Published by the Institution of Electrical Engineers, ISBN 0-85296-786-1, London, Nov. 2001.
- S. Lucyszyn (Editor), Advanced RF MEMS, 412-page hardback, Cambridge University Press, ISBN 978-0-521-89771-6, Cambridge, Aug. 2010.

== Selected publications ==
- S. Lucyszyn and I. D. Robertson, "Monolithic narrow-band filter using ultrahigh-Q tunable active inductors", IEEE Transactions on Microwave Theory Tech., vol. MTT-42, no. 12, pp. 2617–2622, Dec. 1994.
- S. Lucyszyn and I. D. Robertson, "Analog reflection topology building blocks for adaptive microwave signal processing applications", IEEE Transactions on Microwave Theory Tech., vol. MTT-43, no. 3, pp. 601–611, Mar. 1995.
- D. S. McPherson and S. Lucyszyn, "Vector modulator for W-band software radar techniques", IEEE Transactions on Microwave Theory Tech., vol. 49, no. 8, pp. 1451–1461, Aug. 2001.
- S. Lucyszyn, "Review of radio frequency microelectromechanical systems technology", IEE Proceedings – Science, Measurement and Technology, vol. 151, no. 2., pp. 93–103, Mar. 2004 (Winner of IEE Premium Award).
- J. S. Lee and S. Lucyszyn, "A micromachined refreshable Braille cell", IEEE/ASME Journal of Microelectromechanical Systems, vol. 14, no. 4, pp. 673–682, Aug. 2005.
- S. Pranonsatit, A. S. Holmes, I. D. Robertson, and S. Lucyszyn, "Single-pole eight-throw RF MEMS rotary switch", IEEE/ASME Journal of Microelectromechanical Systems, vol. 15, no. 6, pp. 1735–1744, Dec. 2006.
- M. Pinuela, D. C. Yates, S. Lucyszyn and P. D. Mitcheson, "Maximising DC-to-load efficiency for inductive power transfer", IEEE Transactions on Power Electronics, vol. 28, no. 5. pp. 2437–2447, May 2013.
- M. Pinuela, P. D. Mitcheson and S. Lucyszyn, "Ambient RF energy harvesting in urban and semi-urban environments", IEEE Transactions on Microwave Theory and Techniques, vol. 61, no. 7. pp. 2715–2726, Jul. 2013.
- X. Liang, F. Hu, Y. Yan and S. Lucyszyn, "Secure thermal infrared communications using engineered blackbody radiation", Scientific Reports, Nature Publishing Group, Sci. Rep. 4, 5245, pp. 1–7, Jun. 2014.
- H. Ren and S. Lucyszyn, "Thermodynamics-based cognitive demodulation for `THz Torch' wireless communications links", Scientific Reports, Nature Publishing Group, Sci. Rep. 10, 6259, pp. 1–12, Apr. 2020.
- H. Ren, S.-H. Shin and S. Lucyszyn, "Enhanced cognitive demodulation with artificial intelligence", Scientific Reports, Nature Publishing Group, Sci. Rep. 10, 20298, pp. 1–16, Nov. 2020.
- M. D'Auria, W. J. Otter, J. Hazell, B. T. W. Gillatt, C. Long-Collins, N. M. Ridler and S. Lucyszyn, "3-D printed metal-pipe rectangular waveguides", IEEE Transactions on Components, Packaging and Manufacturing Technology, vol. 5, no. 9, pp. 1339–1349, Sep. 2015.
- W. J. Otter and S. Lucyszyn, "Hybrid 3-D-printing technology for tunable THz applications", Proceedings of IEEE, Special Issue on Additive Manufacturing of Radio-Frequency Components, vol. 105, no. 4, pp. 756–767, Apr. 2017 (Invited).
- S.-H. Shin, D. Alyasiri, M. D’Auria, W. J. Otter, C. W. Myant, D. Stokes, Z. Tian, N. M. Ridler and S. Lucyszyn, "Polymer-based 3-D printed Ku-band steerable phased-array antenna subsystem", IEEE Access, vol. 7, pp. 106662–106673, Aug. 2019.
- S.-H. Shin, X. Shang, N. M. Ridler and S. Lucyszyn, "Polymer-based 3-D printed 140-220 GHz low-cost quasi-optical components and integrated subsystem assembly", IEEE Access, vol. 9, pp. 28020–28038, Feb. 2021.
- S.-H. Shin, R. Payapulli, L. Zhu, M. Stanley, X. Shang, N. M. Ridler, and S. Lucyszyn, “3-D printed plug and play prototyping for low-cost sub-THz subsystems”, IEEE Access, vol. 10, pp. 41708-41719, Apr. 2022.
- L. Zhu, S.-H. Shin, R. Payapulli, I. W. Rossuck, N. Klein, N. M. Ridler, and S. Lucyszyn, “3-D printed THz waveguide components”, IEEE Access, vol. 11, pp. 79073-79086, Aug. 2023.
