= Eskdaleside cum Ugglebarnby =

Civil parish in North Yorkshire, England

Coordinates: 54°26′18″N 0°39′45″W

- Civil parish
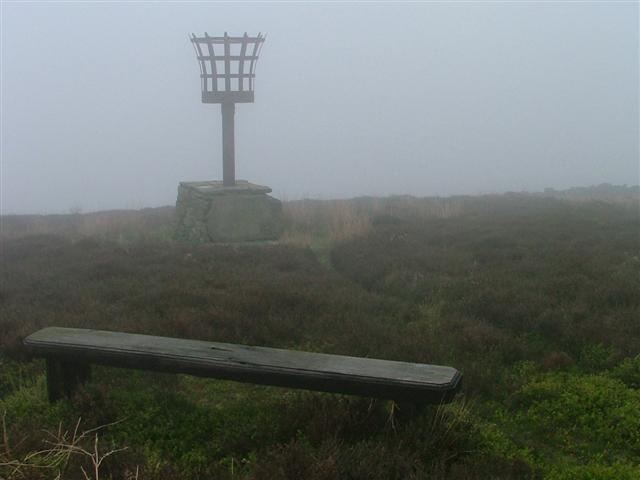
- A misty day at the Millennium Beacon in Eskdaleside, below

- Population: 2,238 (2011 census)
- OS grid reference: NZ867055
- Civil parish: Eskdaleside cum Ugglebarnby
- Unitary authority: North Yorkshire
- Ceremonial county: North Yorkshire
- Region: Yorkshire and the Humber
- Country: England
- Sovereign state: United Kingdom
- Post town: WHITBY
- Postcode district: YO22
- Police: North Yorkshire
- Fire: North Yorkshire
- Ambulance: Yorkshire
- UK Parliament: Scarborough and Whitby

Eskdaleside cum Ugglebarnby is a civil parish in North Yorkshire, England, comprising the two villages of Sleights and Ugglebarnby.

According to the 2011 UK census, Eskdaleside cum Ugglebarnby parish had a population of 2,238, a reduction on the 2001 UK census figure of 2,252.

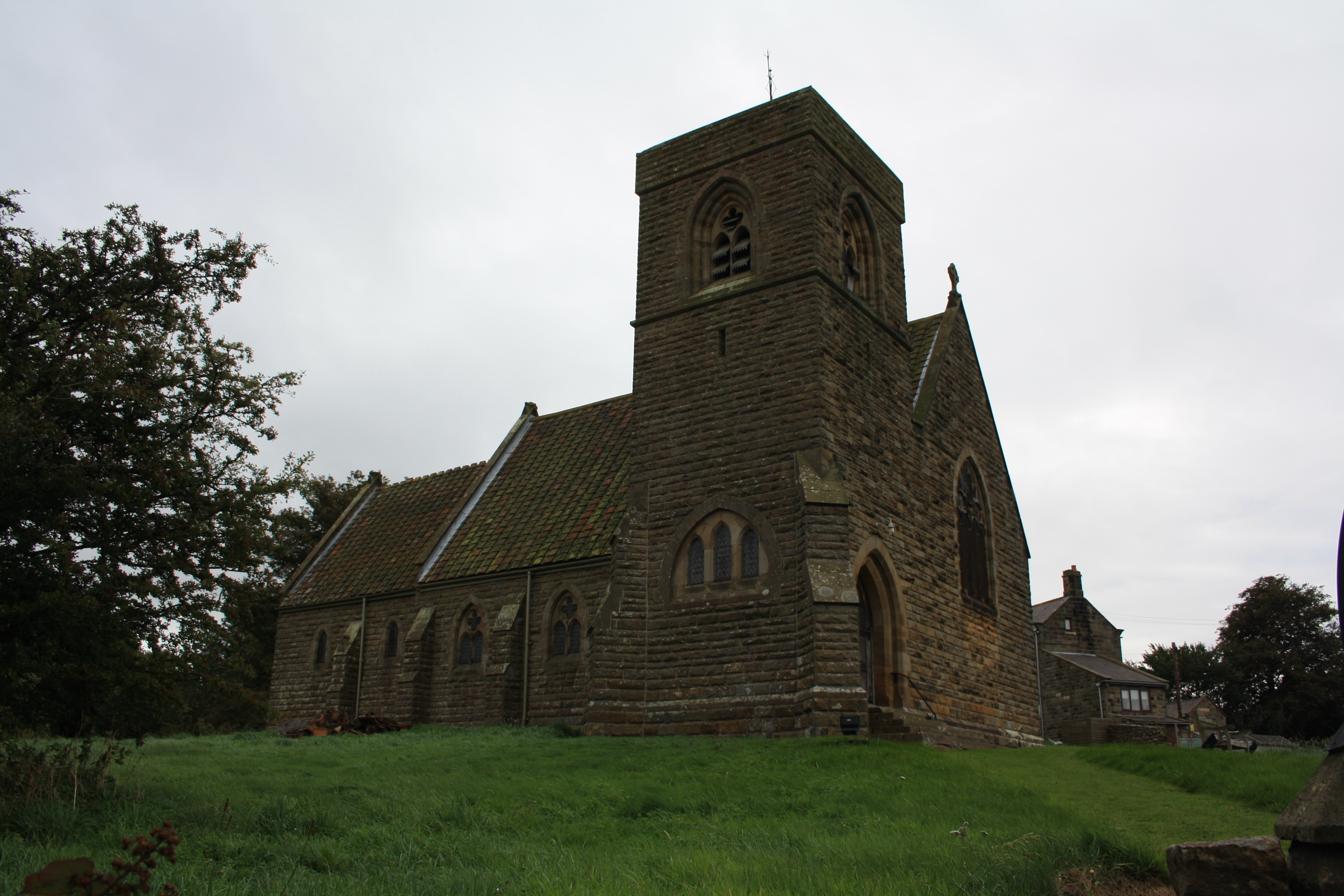
All Saints’ Church

All Saints' Church, Ugglebarnby lies in the village. From 1974 to 2023 it was part of the Borough of Scarborough, it is now administered by the unitary North Yorkshire Council.

== Eskdaleside murder (1841) ==
In 1841 the murder of Mrs Jane Robinson (née Wilson 1777) was one of the first cases in which an officer from Scotland Yard was sent to investigate a serious crime in the provinces. A miller, William Hill, had been charged with the murder and acquitted, but Nicholas Pearce traced a Thomas Redhead who had almost certainly committed the offence, but had died of smallpox shortly before Pearce traced him. Jane Robinson (née Wilson) was the daughter of John Wilson of Eskdalegate (1725–1794) and Mary Hall (1743–1832). She was murdered at Eskdalegate.

== Venerable Nicholas Postgate's arrest (1679) ==
Eskdaleside was host to other events in its history, one being the arrest and later execution in York of an 82-year-old man. His only crime was that of being a Catholic priest.

In 1596 the Venerable Nicholas Postgate, a Catholic priest and martyr, was born and lived in a humble home, now called The Hermitage, at Ugthorpe. He studied at Douai College, France, becoming a priest in 1628. He worked secretly as a priest in a wide area of Yorkshire, finally settling back to Ugthorpe in the 1660s.

Although anti-Catholic feeling had subsided a good deal, it flared up again due to the fake Popish Plot of 1678; this followed a false testimony from Titus Oates in which he claimed there was a conspiracy to install a Catholic king, and he fomented a renewed and fierce persecution of English Catholics. It was to be the last time that Catholics were put to death in England for their faith; one of the last victims – but not the very last – was Nicholas Postgate.

During the panic engineered by Oates, a prominent Protestant magistrate in London, Sir Edmund Berry Godfrey, was murdered and Oates loudly blamed the Catholics; Sir Edmund's manservant, John Reeves, set out to get his revenge. For reasons which are not clear, he decided to base his actions in the Whitby area, possibly because he knew that priests arrived there from France.

Nicholas Postgate was arrested at Redbarns Farm, Ugglebarnby, where he was to carry out a baptism. The family had apparently spoken publicly about the ceremony, thus alerting the authorities to Postgate's presence. Reeves, with a colleague called William Cockerill, raided the house during the ceremony and caught the priest, then aged 82. On 7 August 1679, he was tried for treason in York and then hanged, disembowelled and quartered.

Every year since 1974 an open-air service has been held – alternately in Egton Bridge and Ugthorpe – in honour of Fr Postgate.

== See also ==
- Listed buildings in Eskdaleside cum Ugglebarnby
