= Bridge 42 =

Railway bridge in North Yorkshire, England

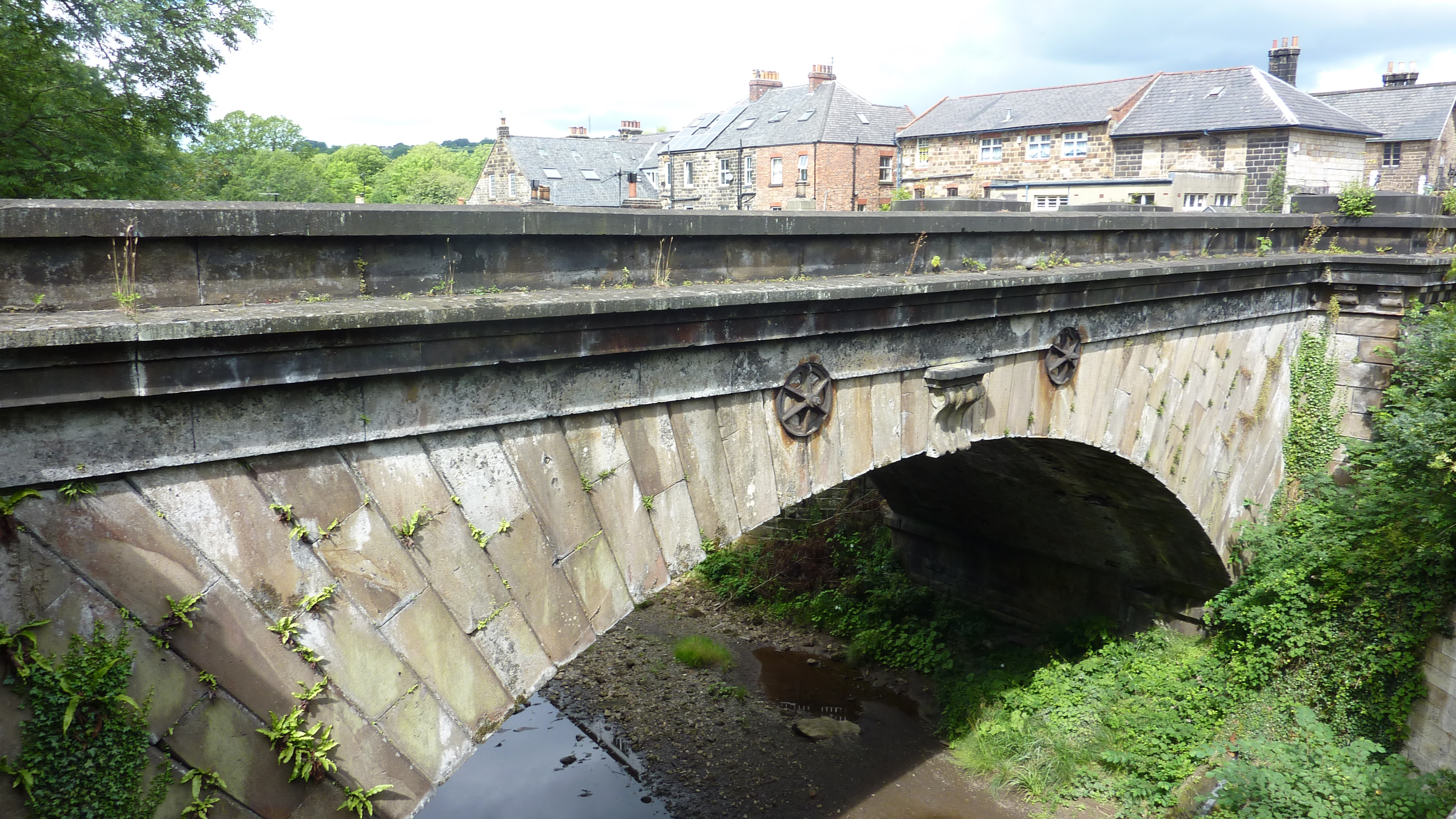
- Bridge 42
- Coordinates: 54.43543°N 0.72494°W
- OS grid reference: NZ 828 051
- Carries: North Yorkshire Moors Railway
- Crosses: Murk Esk
- Locale: Grosmont, North Yorkshire, England
- Other name: Railway bridge across the Murk Esk

Characteristics
- No. of spans: 1

Rail characteristics
- No. of tracks: 2
- Track gauge: 1,435 mm (4 ft 8 1/2 in) standard gauge

History
- Designer: John Cass Birkinshaw
- Opened: 1847

Location
- Interactive map of Bridge 42

Bridge 42 is a railway bridge that straddles the Murk Esk in Grosmont, North Yorkshire, England. The double-track bridge was opened in 1847 (Note: The date of opening is disputed with some sources stating 1846. According to Bairstow, the York & North Midland Railway (Y&NMR) did not run steam trains to Whitby until June 1847.) to replace an earlier single-track bridge which is located just to the east. Both bridges are still in use, and are owned and operated by the North Yorkshire Moors Railway (NYMR), with Bridge 42 supporting over 10,000 train movements per year, leading to it being called the "..hardest working structure" on the railway.

== History ==
The bridge is a replacement for the original single-track Whitby & Pickering horse-drawn railway bridge which is situated immediately upstream (eastwards). The older structure measures 54 feet (16 m) in length and is a metal suspension bridge, whereas the newer bridge is a single-arch made of stone. Bridge 42 was opened in 1847 by the York & North Midland Railway (Y&NMR), however, a track was still extant on the old bridge to serve a goods warehouse which was located behind platform 4 in Grosmont station. The bridge crosses the Murk Esk and it was used continually from 1847 onwards until the line closed in 1965. It was re-opened as part of a heritage railway in 1973, and now sees around 10,000 train movements per year, being named by the NYMR as their "hardest working structure". The number of train movements is greater than at other points of the line as the locomotive depot at Grosmont is over the bridge from the station.

The building of the railway revealed iron ore deposits in the area which were exploited for some time, but the North Eastern Railway (successors to the York & North Midland Railway) declined to buy the rights to any iron ore deposits apart from those underneath the bridge over the river Murk Esk at Grosmont, which they acquired in 1875. The bridge, which was grade II listed in 1989, is described by Historic England as "Semicircular arch of radiating voussoirs with moulded corniced keystone, between pairs of square-section buttress piers. Plain band surmounted by cornice, corbelled over piers, and plain parapet with chamfered coping [with] piers [that] rise through parapet and have shallow pyramidal caps." The keystone also has a scrolled motif inlaid upon it. Although it is not definite, it is believed that the bridge was designed by John Cass Birkinshaw.

In 2024, an inspection revealed defects in the stone and brick arch masonry, prompting the NYMR to launch an appeal for funds to repair the structure. It was estimated in 2026 that £800,000 would be needed to repair the structure. The bridge has been propped up temporarily to allow the NYMR to run a service during 2026, with repairs intended to be undertaken over the winter of 2026/2027.

The bridge carries two bi-directional lines with Grosmont station to the north 5 chains (330 ft; 100 m) away, and Grosmont Tunnel to the west, 4 chains (260 ft; 80 m) away (distances are measured from Rillington Junction as the zero point).

== See also ==
- Listed buildings in Grosmont, North Yorkshire
