= Listed buildings in Grosmont, North Yorkshire =

Grosmont is a civil parish in the county of North Yorkshire, England. It contains 15 listed buildings that are recorded in the National Heritage List for England. Of these, one is listed at Grade II*, the middle of the three grades, and the others are at Grade II, the lowest grade. The parish contains the village of Grosmont and the surrounding area. In about 1835, the Whitby and Pickering Railway was built, passing through the parish, this was followed by the York and North Midland Railway in about 1845, and parts of these railways are now used by the North Yorkshire Moors Railway. A number of buildings associated with the railways are listed, including the station, bridges, tunnels and a public house. Later, a signal gantry was moved to the station site, and is listed. The other listed buildings in the parish include houses, a road bridge, a farmhouse and outbuildings, and a church.

== Key ==
Grade	Criteria
II*	Particularly important buildings of more than special interest
II	Buildings of national importance and special interest

== Buildings ==
Name and location	Photograph	Date	Notes	Grade
Grosmont Bridge; 54.43765°N 0.73074°W		17th century or earlier	The bridge carries Front Street over the River Esk. It is in sandstone, and consists of three semicircular arches. The bridge has voussoirs, hood moulds, and shouldered cutwaters rising to pilaster buttresses forming pedestrian refuges. The parapet is raked, with cambered coping, beneath it is a raised band, and the parapets end in square piers with flat caps.	II
Eskdale Villa; 54.43664°N 0.71901°W	—	Early 19th century	The house is in sandstone, and has a pantile roof with coped gables and shaped kneelers. There are two storeys, three bays, a single-story lean-to wing on the left, and a rear service wing. The doorway has a divided fanlight and a pediment, and the windows are sashes.	II
Priory Farmhouse and outbuilding 54.43926°N 0.73218°W	—	Early 19th century	The farmhouse and outbuildings are in sandstone and have slate roofs with coped gables and plain kneelers. The house has two storeys and a front of three bays, at the rear on the right is a two-storey wing connecting to a range of farm buildings with one storey and a loft. The central doorway has pilasters and a cornice hood, and the windows are sashes. The farm buildings contain two semicircular cart arches of voussoirs, and pitching openings above.	II
Rose Cottage; 54.43643°N 0.72395°W	—	Early 19th century	The house is in sandstone on a chamfered plinth, and has a slate roof with coped gables and coved kneelers. There are two storeys and two bays, and a rear wing. In the centre is a trellised porch, and the windows are sashes.	II
Pedestrian Subway; 54.43443°N 0.72466°W		1835	Originally a horse tramway tunnel for the Whitby and Pickering Railway Company designed by George Stephenson, and later used as a pedestrian subway. The tunnel is in sandstone and about 110 metres (360 ft) long. At the north end is a round-arched entrance flanked by tapering cylindrical turrets on tall chamfered bases, with flat circular caps. Each turret has a machicolated cornice, and between them is an embattled parapet. To the east is a retaining wall ending in a low cylindrical pier with a machicolated flat cap. The south entrance is similar, but without an embattled parapet.	II*
Outbuildings east of the Station Tavern; 54.43614°N 0.72416°W	—	c. 1835	A long range of buildings in sandstone with a pantile roof and two storeys. They have had a variety of purposes, including workshops, and at the north end was a smithy. There are various openings, including doorways, and sash and casement windows. At the south end is a coped gable and a shaped kneeler.	II
Post Office and attached outbuilding 54.43613°N 0.72459°W	—	c. 1835	The building, which has been used for various purposes through the years, is in sandstone and has a pantile roof with overhanging eaves and bargeboards, and a brick lean-to. There is an L-shaped plan, the front facing the railway with two storeys and an attic, and three bays, the gable end with two storeys and a basement, and a three-bay extension to the right. The building contains windows of various types, including mullioned windows, sashes and casements, and in the attic is a lunette in an architrave with a semicircular hood mould.	II
Station Tavern; 54.43599°N 0.72440°W		c. 1835	The public house, which was built for the Whitby and Pickering Railway Company, is in sandstone on a chamfered plinth, with floor and eaves bands, overhanging eaves and a hipped pantile roof. There are two storeys, three bays on the front, two bays on the left return, and a two-storey two-bay parallel wing recessed at the rear. In the centre of the front is a prostyle Doric porch with a frieze and a moulded cornice, and a doorway with an ogee-shaped lintel. The windows are small-pane casements, those in the ground floor with ogee-shaped heads and lintels. In the parallel wing is a coped parapet ramped up at the ends.	II
Railway bridge across the Murk Esk; 54.43540°N 0.72496°W		c. 1845	The bridge, built by the York and North Midland Railway Company, now carries the North Yorkshire Moors Railway over the Murk Esk. It is in sandstone, and consists of a single semicircular arch with radiating voussoirs and a moulded corniced keystone, between pairs of square buttress piers with shallow pyramidal caps. It has a plain band surmounted by a cornice, corbelled over the piers, and a plain parapet with chamfered coping.	II
Railway tunnel 54.43447°N 0.72492°W		c. 1845	The tunnel was built by the York and North Midland Railway Company and now carries the North Yorkshire Moors Railway. It is in sandstone, and about 130 metres (430 ft) long. Each entrance has a horseshoe arch of shaped voussoirs between tapering square buttresses, with a moulded cornice breaking over the buttresses, under a plain parapet. The west retaining wall is canted, raked and coped.	II
Grosmont station and yard wall 54.43597°N 0.72505°W		c. 1846	The railway station building was designed by G. T. Andrews for the York and North Midland Railway Company. It is in sandstone with quoins and slate roofs. There are two storeys and an L-shaped plan, with a two-bay range and a cross-wing on the left, an outshut and a rear yard. It contains paired doors in ogee-headed surrounds, the windows are mullioned, the openings have quoined surrounds, and the gables have plain bargeboards and finials. On the platform front is a single-storey and four-bay range. The yard wall is about 2.75 metres (9 ft 0 in) high with sloped coping.	II
Railway bridge number 39; 54.42898°N 0.73108°W		c. 1860	An accommodation bridge built by the York and North Midland Railway Company and later used by the North Yorkshire Moors Railway. It is in sandstone, and consists of a single segmental arch of voussoirs with imposts, between buttress piers with shallow pyramidal caps. Flanking the bridge are raking quadrant abutments ending in square piers with pyramidal caps.	II
Footbridge across the Murk Esk; 54.43539°N 0.72476°W		c. 1875	The footbridge crossing the river is a single-span suspension bridge. It is in cast iron with steel cables, and a timber deck with an iron mesh parapet.	II
St Matthew's Church and gateway 54.43473°N 0.72418°W		1875	The church is in sandstone with a Welsh slate roof. It consists of a nave with a clerestory, north and south aisles, the south aisle extending to form an organ chamber, a north porch, and a chancel with a north vestry. On the vestry is a bellcote with two stages, a pyramidal roof, and a Celtic cross finial. Most of the windows are lancets, and at the west end is a rose window. The main gateway to the churchyard has carved gate piers with cross-gabled caps, and ornate wrought iron gates.	II
Former Falsgrave Signal Gantry; 54.43789°N 0.72421°W		1911	The signal gantry was moved from Falsgrave to the northern approach to Grosmont station in 2012 and is in steel, The two gantry uprights are slightly tapering box frames, and the linking bridge has timber boarding and tubular steel handrails. The gantry carries three posts with semaphore signals, two with three upper quadrant signal arms, and one with two. These are painted red with a white stripe on the front and white with a black stripe on the reverse.	II
