= Murk Esk =

River in North Yorkshire, England

Murk Esk Mirk Esk
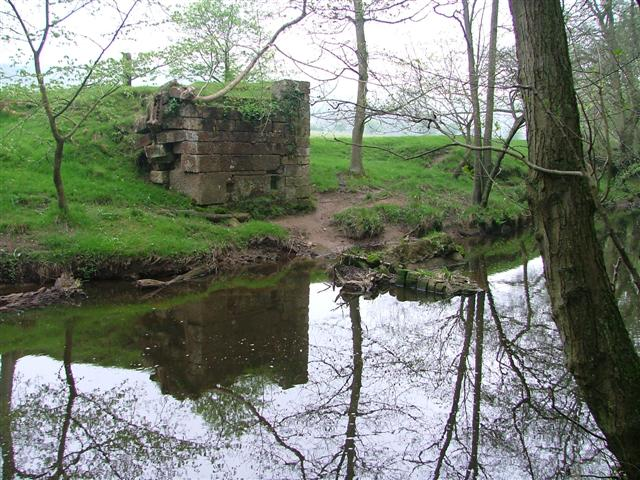
- River Murk Esk and the remains of a tramway bridge

- Mouth of the Murk Esk
- Etymology: Mirchesc

Location
- County: North Yorkshire
- Country: England

Physical characteristics
- Source
  - location: Beck Hole
  - coordinates: 54.4081°N 0.7383°W
- Mouth
  - location: Grosmont
  - coordinates: 54.4365°N 0.7306°W
- Length: 5 kilometres (3 mi)
- Basin size: 6,500 hectares (16,000 acres)

Basin features
- River system: River Esk
- EA waterbody ID: GB104027068060

The Murk Esk is a small river in the North York Moors, North Yorkshire, England. It is a tributary of the River Esk, which flows into the North Sea at Whitby. Mapping shows the river starting at Beck Hole at the confluence of West Beck and Eller Beck, (Note: This watercourse is not to be confused with Eller Beck which flows through Skipton, also in North Yorkshire.) though the watercourses in the upper reaches are sometimes labelled as being Murk Esk.

== Etymology ==
The name is first recorded c. 1230 as Mirchesc, and in the following years the spellings of Myrke, Mirk, and Mirke are used interchangeably. It has also been written as the Muir Esk. Knox suggests the name Murk comes from the dark wooded glen that the river flows through, whereas Wright states that it is named after the colour of the water. The name may also share a root with Knavesmire, Gormire and Ainderby Mires, being derived from the Old Norse myrr meaning marshy ground.

The watercourse is sometimes labelled as a river, and at just 5 kilometres (3 mi) in length, it makes it one of the shortest named rivers in Yorkshire (the River Bain being recognised as the shortest named river within Yorkshire).

== Route ==
The Murk Esk travels mostly over boulder clay from Hazel Head down to Grosmont, but the actual named river of Murk Esk, runs from Beck Hole to Grosmont and covers 5 kilometres (3 mi). The route of the beck has been affected by glacial action; the tributary of Eller Beck travels through a rocky valley near to Darnholm, but before the action of glaciation, it took a more direct route northwards towards Grosmont instead of where it now heads west towards Beck Hole. The river runs in the opposite direction (northwards) over the overflow channel from Lake Eskdale that ran southwards towards Lake Pickering; the waters now run along part of the channel to the Esk in the north. The Murk Esk is formed at Beck Hole, where Eller Beck meets West Beck, though some still call the upper reaches of the tributary becks the Murk Esk.

The Murk Esk is a tributary of the main River Esk, but it itself has several tributaries including Eller Beck (which rises on Fylingdales Moor near to the source of the River Derwent at a height of about 830 feet (250 m) above sea level), West Beck, and Wheeldale Beck. The Murk Esk collectively drains an area of 90 square kilometres (35 sq mi). A significant part of the catchment is composed of woodland and moorland as well as some pastureland and a few settlements. As the river passes by Beck Hole, it travels through the SSSI of Beck Hole, cited for its woodland.

On Eller Beck is Thomason Foss (Note: Alternative spellings such as Thomassin and Thomasin also persist.) (1-mile (1.6 km) north-west of Goathland), a waterfall which drops 4 metres (13 ft) into a pool which is surrounded by undercut sandstone walls. Above the waterfall, the beck narrows to 3 metres (9.8 ft) in width. Mallyan Spout also lies on one of the Murk Esk's tributaries (West Beck).

The footbridge and railway bridge spanning the river at Grosmont, just before the river enters the Esk, are both grade II listed structures. The valley of the Murk Esk provided a channel through which the railway could be built connecting Whitby and Pickering in the 1830s traversing the Murk Esk, Eller Beck and the Newtondale valleys; however, traversing the Murk Esk valley required at least eight railway bridges. In its final reach through Grosmont, the river cuts through a gorge over which the railway and footbridges cross.

== Industry ==
A footbridge across the Murk Esk from the hamlet of Esk Valley (west bank) to Crag Cliffe (east bank) was installed in 2015. A footbridge existed here until 1935 which aided miners and quarrymen engaged in the ironstone and whinstone on the opposite side of the valley to the hamlet to bring their minerals along a tramway across the river. The bridge was washed away in flooding during the 1930s. The flooding also marooned an ancient ford in a field, and the river took a deeper course to the north of the old ford.

A corn mill straddled Eller Beck (sometimes labelled as Murk Esk) near to the second railway station at Goathland; this is why, in the early days of the station's life, it was known as Goathland Mill.
