= Brereton House =

House in Goathland, North Yorkshire, England

Coordinates: 54°24′02″N 0°43′13″W

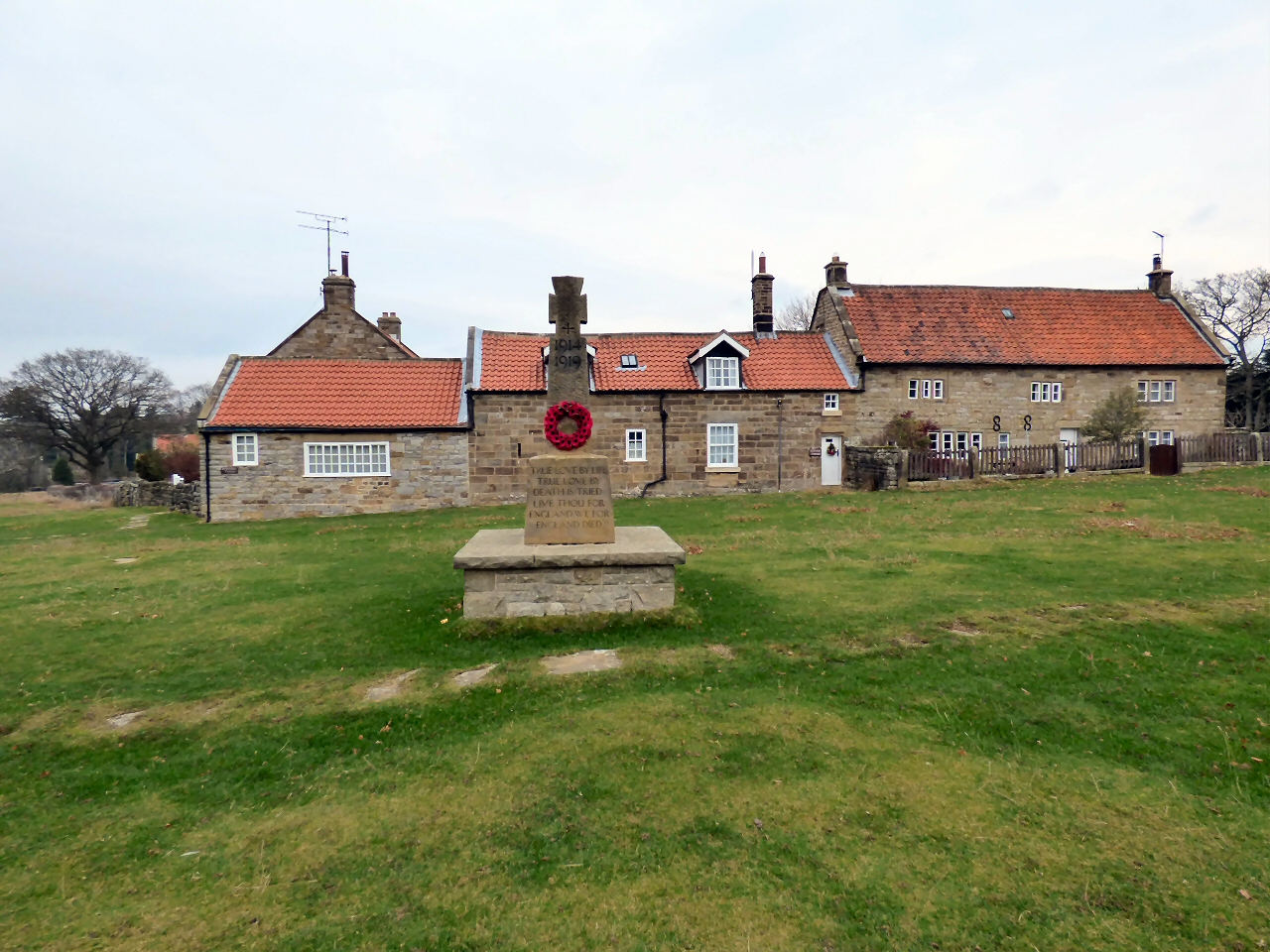
- The house, in 2018

General information
- Architectural style: Cruck-framed longhouse
- Classification: Grade II* listed building
- Location: Goathland, North Yorkshire, England
- Renovated: 1740, 1851, 1936

Design and construction
- Designations: Grade II* listed

Brereton House is a historic building in Goathland, a village in North Yorkshire, in England.

The building was constructed as a cruck-framed longhouse, probably in the 17th century. It was rebuilt in 1740 by John and Elizabeth Cockerill, with the interior greatly altered and a new central entrance provided. In 1851, John and Martha Scarth converted the adjoining byre into additional accommodation, and added a new cowshed at the western end. John Bowes Morrell purchased the house in 1925 as a holiday home, and in 1936, regular guests Jean and Oliver Sheldon converted the cowshed into Brereton Cottage, and by the late 1940s were living there permanently. In 1969, the house and cottage were jointly grade II* listed.

The house has a cruck-framed core encased in sandstone, and pantile roofs with coped gables and shaped kneelers. The house, on the right, has two storeys and three bays. It has a moulded eaves course, and contains a doorway with a quoined and chamfered surround and an initialled and dated heavy lintel. There is one fixed-light window, and the other windows are mullioned. The cottage has one storey and an attic, and two bays. The cross-passage doorway has a quoined and chamfered surround and a lintel carved in a shallow arch. The windows are sashes, one with a dated and initialled sill. In the attic are two gabled dormers. Inside, there are pairs of upper crucks, and the house contains an inglenook fireplace. Several internal doors survive from the 1740 rebuilding.

== See also ==
- Grade II* listed buildings in North Yorkshire (district)
- Listed buildings in Goathland
