= Street House Farm =

Farmhouse in Ainderby Mires with Holtby, North Yorkshire, England

Coordinates: 54°20′13″N 1°36′07″W

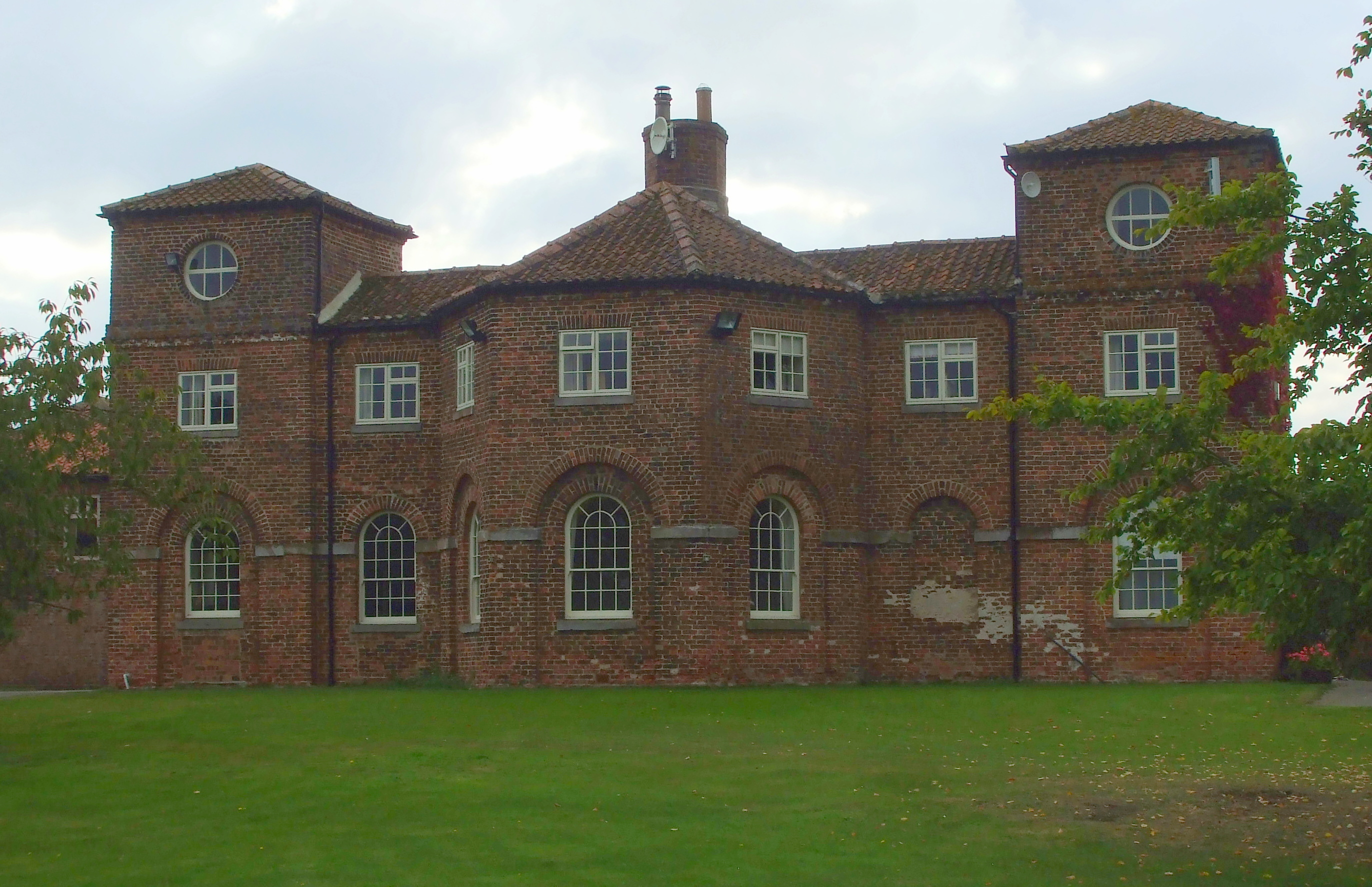
The farmhouse, in 2014

Street House Farm is a historic farm in Ainderby Miers with Holtby, in North Yorkshire in England.

The model farm was one of several near Hornby Castle, which were commissioned by Robert Darcy, 4th Earl of Holderness. It is on a prominent site, visible from the Great North Road. It is believed to have been designed by John Carr of York, and building work was completed in 1768. The buildings were Grade II listed in 1988, but by 2006 were no longer used as a farm, and were in poor repair. They were restored as Crab Tree Hall Business Centre, which opened in 2007, and also included a conference centre.

The main farmhouse is built of brick, with stone dressings and a pantile roof. It is seven bays wide and generally two storeys high, although the outermost bays are instead of three storeys, in the form of square towers. The three central bays come further forward. There is a large, octagonal, central chimney stack. The two-storey barn and granary, single-storey barn with a pyramidal roof, sometimes used a pavilion, and two-storey threshing barn with attached outbuilding, are also listed at grade II.

== See also ==
- Listed buildings in Ainderby Miers with Holtby
