= Beck Hole =

Village in North Yorkshire, England

Coordinates: 54.40985°N 0.73481°W

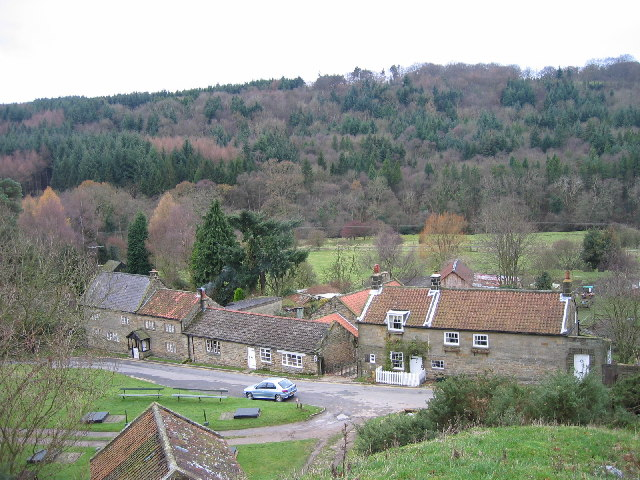
- Beck Hole

- Location within North Yorkshire
- OS grid reference: NZ822023
- Civil parish: Goathland
- Unitary authority: North Yorkshire
- Ceremonial county: North Yorkshire
- Region: Yorkshire and the Humber
- Country: England
- Sovereign state: United Kingdom
- Post town: WHITBY
- Postcode district: YO22
- Police: North Yorkshire
- Fire: North Yorkshire
- Ambulance: Yorkshire
- UK Parliament: Scarborough and Whitby

Beck Hole is a small valley-based village in the county of North Yorkshire, England. The village lies within the Goathland civil parish and the North York Moors national park.

From 1974 to 2023 it was part of the Borough of Scarborough. It is now administered by the unitary North Yorkshire Council.

== Geography and description ==
Beck Hole is located at approximately 70 m (230 ft) above sea level in the North York Moors, in the valley of the Murk Esk river, a tributary of the River Esk. The village is approximately 1.25 miles (2 km) roughly north-west of Goathland and within the same civil parish. It is accessed by a road with very steep gradients on either side of the village, but the route of the former Whitby-to-Pickering railway offers an easier walking route. The North Yorkshire Moors Railway passes the village close by to the north.

The majority of the structures in the village are listed, including several 18th-century sandstone buildings: the Birch Hall Inn (cottages and with 19th century extension), Fir Tree farmhouse, Brookwood farmhouse (outbuildings to Fir Tree farm, now dwellings), 'The White House', and 'Old Woodbine'. Also listed are the 19th century stone bridge over the Ellerbeck, and the 19th century former public house, the 'Lord Nelson'. On the outskirts of the village are further historic buildings: the G.T. Andrews designed former railway building, 'Incline Cottage'; and 'Lins' a 17th-century longhouse.

== History ==
The origins of Beck Hole date to the Middle Ages; it was set within the Forest of Pickering, which began to be cleared in the 13th century. The first records referencing the village, originally known as Amerholm, date to the late 16th century, and mention a single farmstead. A fulling mill was in operation at the river bank around this period.

The 'Bulls Head' public house was established around 1770, in a house built c. 1677. The building was renamed the 'Lord Nelson' in 1801, and rebuilt around 1850. It closed as a public house in 1940.

One of the key landmarks in Beck Hole is the single Scots Pine within the garden of Firtree house. The tree date back to the construction of the house where it was said that houses with a Scots pine where royalest and faithful. At the time of planting two trees resided until before the 1900s the second was struck with lightning and burnt down.

The Whitby and Pickering Railway was opened in 1836, with the incline from Beckhole to Goathland worked as a rope hauled cable railway. A railway station was established. The incline was replaced by a deviation in 1865, and part of the line remained in use as a branch to Beck Hole until it closed in 1951.

In the late 1850s the Whitby Iron Company as formed and began extraction of iron stone around Beckhole; two blast furnaces were built which began production of iron in 1860. At around the same time a row of 33 cottages was built for industrial workers, and the Birch Hall Inn was expanded and gained a licence. The operation was unsuccessful, and short-lived, hampered by a fault in one of the furnaces, and landslips at a mine. The blast furnaces ceased operation in 1864, and the works were put up for sale in 1876, and were sold in 1888, being demolished in the following years. The workers' terrace was also demolished.

The village was connected to Egton by a main road after 1868. Mains electricity and mains water reached the village in the decade after the Second World War.

Two community digs have taken place in recent years (2017-2018) in order to unearth remains from the area's iron extraction history.

== Beckhole Woodland and Heritage Foundation ==
Beckhole Woodland and Heritage Foundation was formed by residents of Beckhole in 2006 in order to preserve and protect the ancient woodland of the valley and interpret the wealth of local heritage. In Victorian times Beckhole was famous for its many orchards. Visitors would come from miles around to enjoy the walks and waterfalls and take tea beneath the apple trees. In 2009 the Goathland School celebrated its Bi-centenary. The BHWF decided to mark the occasion by planting an apple orchard on land in Beckhole - kindly provided by the Ainley family, formerly of Firs Farm. With help from The Tree Council, donations from Goathland Post Office, the North York Moors National Park and collection boxes at The Birch Hall Inn, money was raised to prepare the orchard and plant 20 different heritage apple trees, each of which has been adopted by a child from Goathland School.

Trees were planted on the side of the Rail Trail, before the Ellerbeck Footbridge, on 1 March 2009, and once they were established the children came down to 'meet' their trees on 24 April.

== See also ==
- Listed buildings in Goathland
