= Mallyan Spout Hotel =

Hotel in Goathland, North Yorkshire, England

Coordinates: 54.3955°N 0.7273°W

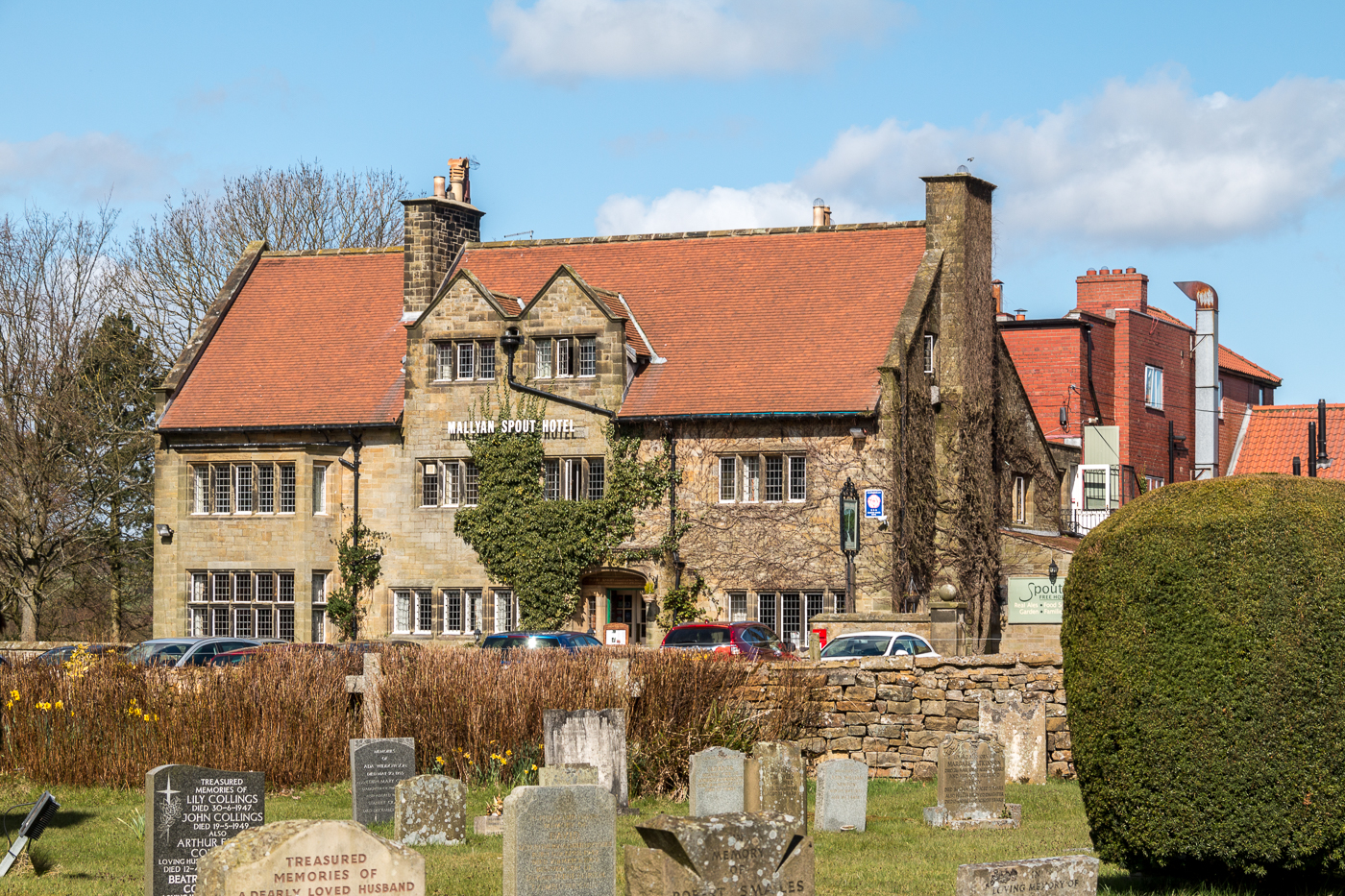
The hotel, in 2016

The Mallyan Spout Hotel is a historic hotel in Goathland, a village in North Yorkshire, in England.

The hotel was designed by James Demaine and Walter Brierley and was completed in 1892. Between 1932 and 1935, part of the building was demolished and rebuilt, and the hotel was extended. Patrick Nuttgens states that "the interior has been altered here and there but the whole of the front block is unmistakeable Brierley, very comfortable, solid and warm". In 2022, the building suffered some damage in a fire, which started in its laundry room. It has been grade II listed since 1989.

It is in sandstone, the extension is in red brick fronted in sandstone, and it has overhanging bracketed eaves, and tile roofs with coped gables and raised kneelers. There are two storeys and four bays, with attics over the middle two bays. The porch has an elliptical-arched doorway with a chamfered surround, spandrels with a monogram and the date, and a hood mould. The windows are mullioned, to the left is a two-storey canted bay window with a cornice, the ground floor windows with transomed, and in the attic are gabled half-dormers. The extensions have similar features.

== See also ==
- Listed buildings in Goathland
