= St Matthew's Church, Grosmont =

Church in North Yorkshire, England

Coordinates: 54.4347°N 0.7242°W

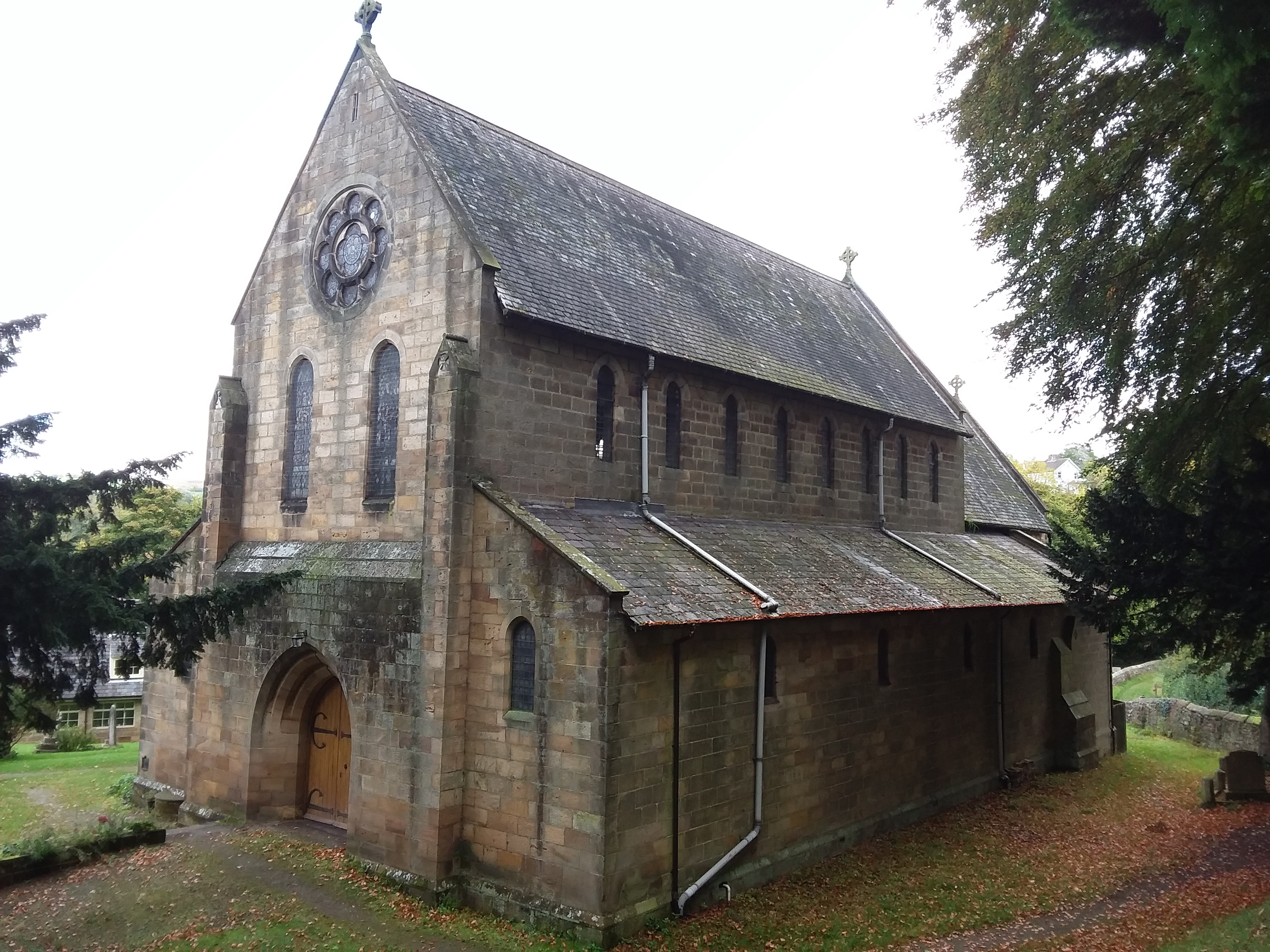
The church, in 2017

St Matthew's Church is the parish church of Grosmont, North Yorkshire, a village in England.

The village grew up in the 18th and early 19th centuries, and in 1840 Robert Cary Elwes donated a site for the construction of a church. It was completed in 1842, but in 1875 was entirely rebuilt. The new church cost about £1,000, and was largely funded by Charles and Thomas Bagnall and Mary Clarke. The church was designed by Charles Noel-Armfield, and incorporates a roof designed on acoustic principles which he had discovered in some Italian churches. Between 2012 and 2013, the west end of the aisles were partitioned off to create a kitchen and toilets, following which, the church was grade II listed, along with the churchyard gateway.

The church is built of sandstone with a Welsh slate roof. It consists of a nave with a clerestory, north and south aisles, the south aisle extending to form an organ chamber, a north porch, and a chancel with a north vestry. On the vestry is a bellcote with two stages, a pyramidal roof, and a Celtic cross finial. Most of the windows are lancets, and at the west end is a rose window. The main gateway to the churchyard has carved gate piers with cross-gabled caps, and ornate wrought iron gates. Inside, there is a stone reredos with a mosaic Crucifixion scene, an aumbry and sedilia. There is an organ manufactured by Alfred Kirkland, assorted stained glass, a stone pulpit depicting Saint Matthew, and an altar designed by Robert Thomson. The font is believed to be late 11th century.

== See also ==
- Listed buildings in Grosmont, North Yorkshire
