= Station Tavern =

Pub in Grosmont, North Yorkshire, England

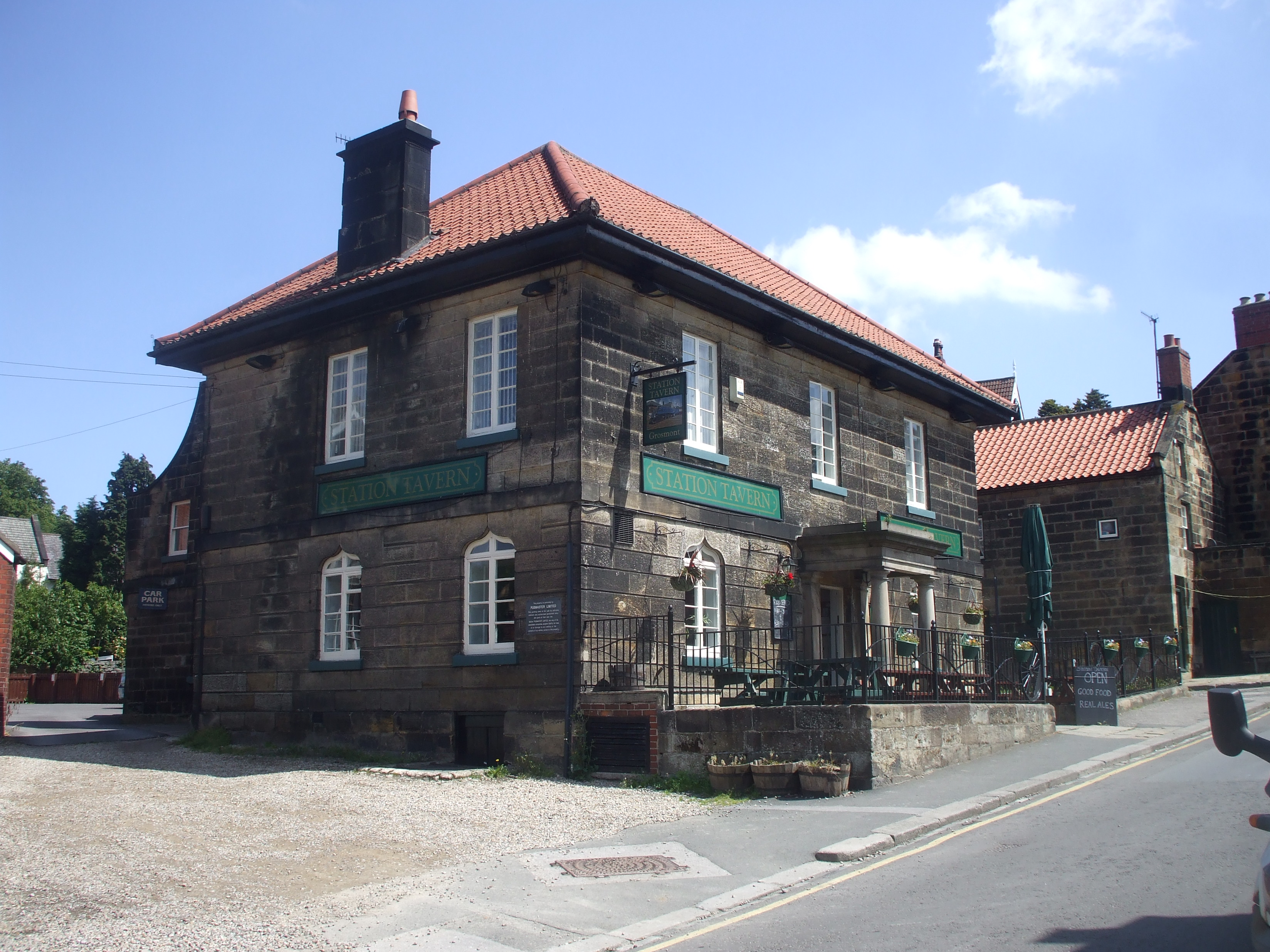
The pub, in 2011

The Station Tavern is a historic pub in Grosmont, North Yorkshire, a village in England.

The pub was built in about 1835 for the Whitby and Pickering Railway, and may have been the first purpose-built building associated with that railway. It was originally named the "Station Hotel", and is located very close to what is now Grosmont railway station. It is noted for its views of the North Yorkshire Moors Railway, and for its food. Alan Whitworth describes it as "architecturally, one of the more interesting buildings in the village".

The pub is built of sandstone on a chamfered plinth, with floor and eaves bands, overhanging eaves and a hipped pantile roof. There are two storeys, three bays on the front, two bays on the left return, and a two-storey two-bay parallel wing recessed at the rear. In the centre of the front is a prostyle Doric porch with a frieze and a moulded cornice, and a doorway with an ogee-shaped lintel. The windows are small-pane casements, those in the ground floor with ogee-shaped heads and lintels. In the parallel wing is a coped parapet ramped up at the ends.

== See also ==
- Listed buildings in Grosmont, North Yorkshire
