= Birch Hall Inn =

Listed pub in North Yorkshire, England

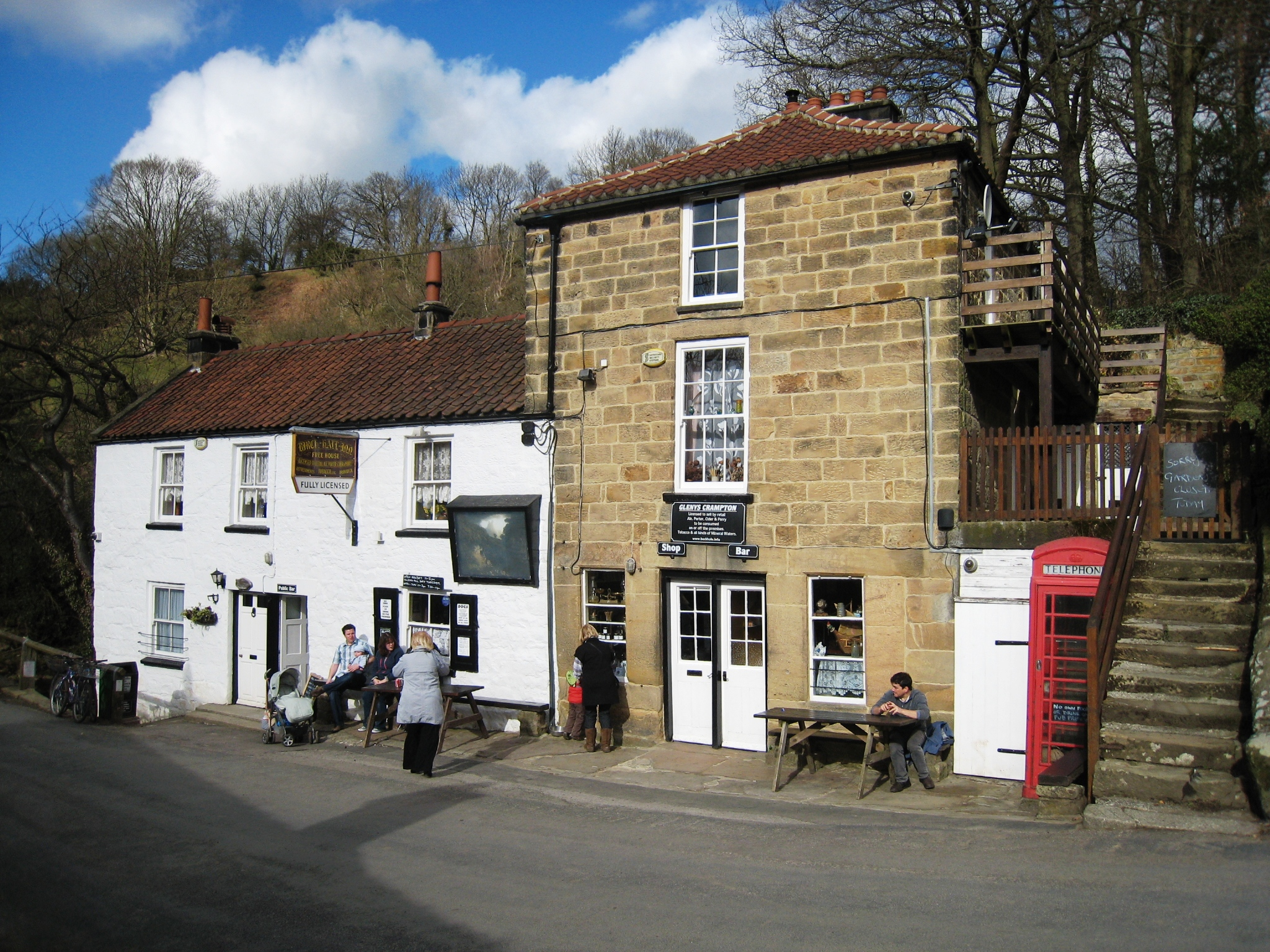
- The Birch Hall Inn in 2010
- Interactive map of the Birch Hall Inn area

General information
- Type: Public house
- Location: Beck Hole Road, Beck Hole, North Yorkshire, England
- Coordinates: 54°24′31″N 0°44′07″W
- Year built: Mid to late 18th century (probable)
- Renovated: Mid-19th century (extended and altered)

Design and construction
- Designations

Listed Building – Grade II
- Official name: Birch Hall Inn
- Designated: 6 October 1969
- Reference no.: 1295923

The Birch Hall Inn is a Grade II listed public house on Beck Hole Road in Beck Hole, a village in the North York Moors, England. Founded around 1860, it is noted for its small bars and shop, and interior, and is popular with hiking tourists on holiday in the area.

== History and description ==
There is documentary evidence of a building on the site dating to at least the 17th century. The original construction of the current building is thought date to the mid to late 18th century, consisting of a building of two single-storey cottages. Contemporary with the arrival of the Whitby to Pickering Railway and the establishment of the Whitby Iron Company in Beck Hole, in the mid-19th century the landlords, Ralph and Mary Dowson, added a second floor to the original cottages, and added a three-storey extension to the building, originally used as a shop with tenements above for industrial workers.

The painter Algernon Newton created a pub sign for the inn during his stay in Beck Hole in the 1940s.

The main bar, 'Big Bar', is within one of the original cottages, a second bar, the 'Little Bar', was added after the Second World War in the Victorian three-storey extension. A very small shop in the building sells sweets and postcards. The building is Grade II listed, and the interior, relatively unchanged since the 1930s is listed in CAMRA's National Inventory of Historic Pub Interiors.

== See also ==
- Listed buildings in Goathland
