= St Mary's Church, Goathland =

Church in North Yorkshire, England

Coordinates: 54°23′42″N 0°43′36″W

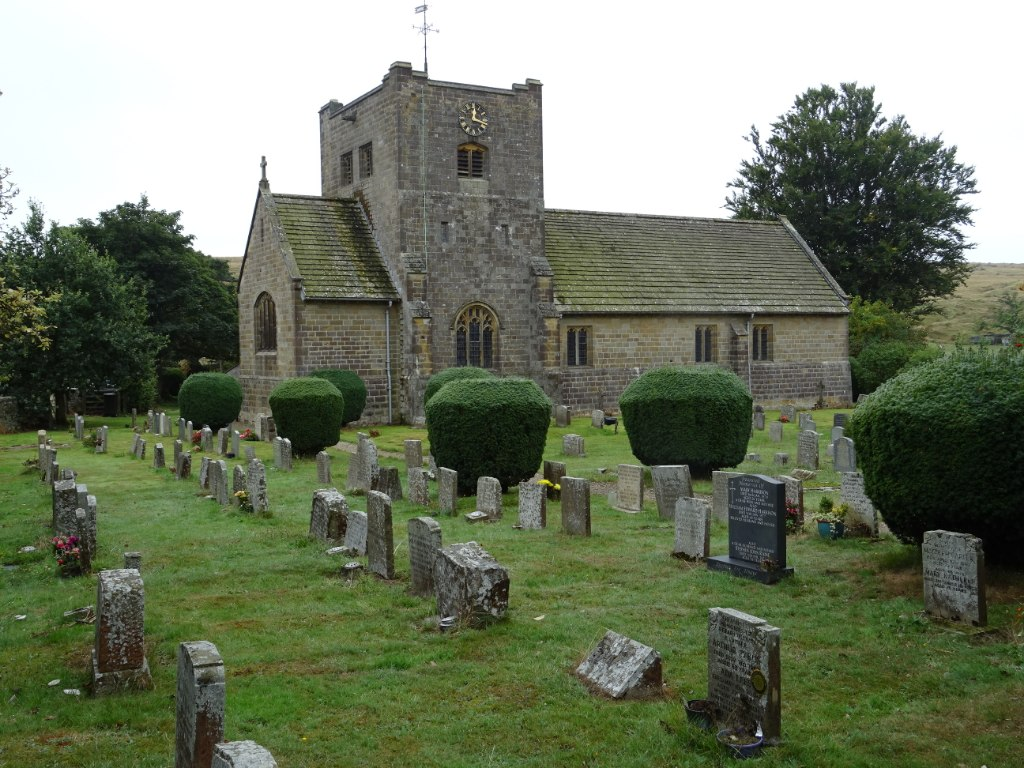
The church, in 2017

St Mary's Church is the parish church of Goathland, a village in North Yorkshire, in England.

A hermitage chapel was built in Goathland in the 11th or 12th century, and a second St Mary's chapel was recorded in 1568. It was demolished in the early 19th century, and a new church was completed in 1820, although it was described in the Victoria County History as "a poor structure". Between 1894 and 1896, the current church was built, to a design by Walter Brierley. It is in the Perpendicular Gothic style, with influence from the arts and crafts movement. The church was grade II* listed in 1969, along with its steps and handrail.

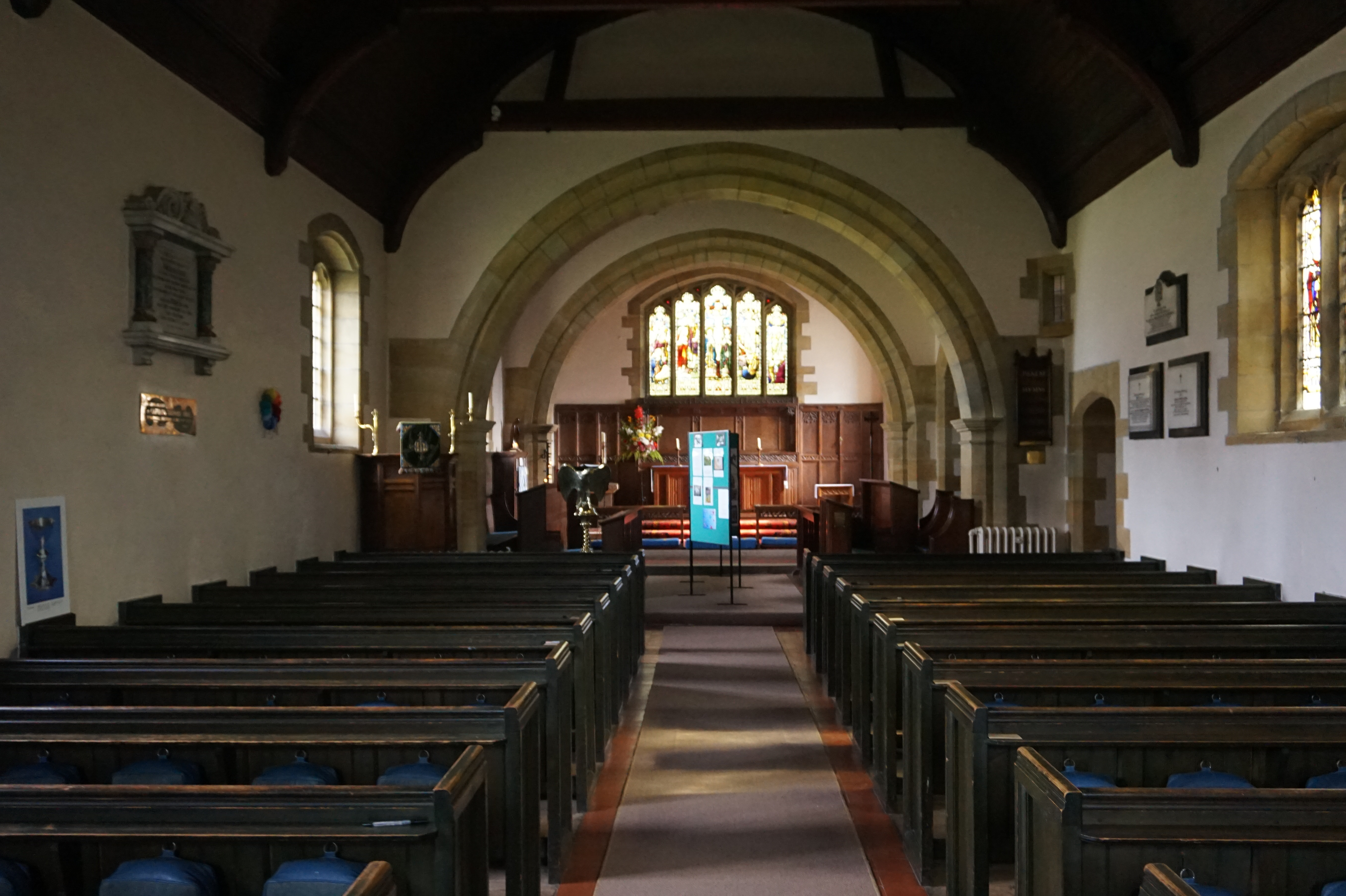
View from the nave into the chancel

The church is built of sandstone with a stone slate roof. It consists of a nave, a south porch, a choir, a south organ chamber and a vestry under a central tower, and a chancel. The tower has three stages, angle buttresses, and a southwest stair turret. On the south front is a doorway with a pointed arch and a three-light square-headed window, and on the north front is a three-light round-headed window with a hood mould. The bell openings have one or two lights, on the north and south fronts are clock faces, and at the top is a plain parapet with moulded coping, and a weathervane. The porch is approached by steps with a wrought iron handrail.

Inside, there is a bowl font dating from around 1100, brought from a demolished church in Egton. It has an elaborate timber cover, constructed in 1903. There is a 12th-century altar slab, probably from the hermitage chapel, and a grave slab dating from 1695. The pulpit is 17th century, while the choir fittings are by Brierely, and other fittings including the altar and reredos are by Robert Thompson. The stained glass in the east and south windows is from the early 20th century, while the west windows have stained glass inserted to celebrate the Millennium.

== See also ==
- Grade II* listed churches in North Yorkshire (district)
- Listed buildings in Goathland
