= Listed buildings in Ainderby Miers with Holtby =

Ainderby Miers with Holtby is a civil parish in the county of North Yorkshire, England. It contains seven listed buildings that are recorded in the National Heritage List for England. All the listed buildings are designated at Grade II, the lowest of the three grades, which is applied to "buildings of national importance and special interest". The parish is mainly rural, and contains the settlements of Ainderby Miers and Holtby, and the surrounding countryside. The listed buildings consist of farmhouses, farm buildings, a house and a bridge.

== Buildings ==
Name and location	Photograph	Date	Notes
Ainderby Myers Manor; 54.32984°N 1.60802°W	—	Late 16th century	A farmhouse in stone, the south front rendered, with quoins, and a tile roof with one moulded coped gable. There are two storeys, a main range of four bays, and two wings extending to the north. The windows are a mix of casements and horizontally sliding sashes, some with mullions. At the north end, linking the wings, is a semicircular archway with moulded imposts, an archivolt, a carved keystone, shields in the spandrels, and a moulded cornice. Inside, there is a large inglenook fireplace.
Street House Farmhouse; 54.33704°N 1.60184°W		1768	The farmhouse, designed by John Carr, is in brick with stone dressings, dentilled bands, a dentilled cornice and a pantile roof. There are seven bays, the middle five bays with two storeys, and the middle three bays projecting as a full-height canted bay window. The outer bays project as square towers with three storeys and hipped roofs. In each bay in the ground floor are round-arched recesses, most containing round-arched sash windows, and joined by impost bands. The windows in the upper floor are casements with flat heads, and in the top floor of the outer bays are round windows.
Barn and granary, Street House Farm; 54.33680°N 1.60200°W	—	1768	The barn and granary are in brick on a plinth, with dentilled eaves, and a hipped Welsh slate roof. There are two storeys and three bays. In the central bay is a blind round-arched opening with an impost band, the left bay contains two stable doors with fanlights, and in the right bay is a wagon doorway. On the right return steps lead up to an upper floor doorway. In the centre of the upper floor is a blind recess, and the outer bays contain casement windows with flat brick arches.
Pavilion, Street House Farm; 54.33685°N 1.60177°W	—	1768	The pavilion or store, is in brick with a band, dentilled eaves and a pyramidal pantile roof. There is a single storey, a square plan and a single bay. It contains a doorway and a four-pane window.
Threshing barn and outbuilding, Street House Farm; 54.33713°N 1.60218°W	—	1768	The barn and outbuilding are in brick with dentilled eaves and hipped pantile roofs. The barn has two storeys and five bays, and the lower outbuilding to the east has two bays. The barn contains a central round-arched wagon opening with voussoirs and an impost band, flanked by slit vents. The outbuilding has double carriage doors, a blind round-arched opening and a continuous band.
Holtby Hall; 54.32522°N 1.58939°W	—	Late 18th to early 19th century	The house is in rendered brick and stone, with stone dressings, a cornice, and hipped Welsh slate roofs. There are three storeys, three bays, and a three-bay rear wing. In the centre is a doorway with an architrave, a Gothic fanlight, moulded consoles and an open pediment, flanked by full-height bowed bays. The windows are sashes, those in the middle floor with architraves, and in the top floor with plain surrounds.
Bowbridge; 54.33358°N 1.61410°W		Early 19th century	The bridge carries Bowbridge Lane over a stream. It is in stone and consists of a single semicircular arch with voussoirs, a band, and a parapet with flat copings. The side walls are splayed, and end in square piers.
