= Listed buildings in Goathland =

Goathland is a civil parish in the county of North Yorkshire, England. It contains 50 listed buildings that are recorded in the National Heritage List for England. Of these, two are listed at Grade II*, the middle of the three grades, and the others are at Grade II, the lowest grade. The parish contains the villages of Goathland and Beck Hole, and the surrounding countryside and moorland. The North Yorkshire Moors Railway and its station, Goathland station is listed, together with associated structures. Most of the other listed buildings consist of houses, cottages and associated structures, farmhouses and farm buildings, and the rest include waymarkers and boundary stones, a pinfold, a public house and a hotel, bridges, a church and a war memorial.

== Key ==
Grade	Criteria
II*	Particularly important buildings of more than special interest
II	Buildings of national importance and special interest

== Buildings ==
Name and location	Photograph	Date	Notes	Grade
Ann's Cross; 54.38945°N 0.65027°W		Medieval	A waymarker and boundary cross, it is in stone. The cross consists of a hollow square socket stone with a broken cross shaft, and is about 1.1 metres (3 ft 7 in) high.	II
Old House and byre, Thornhill Farm; 54.38927°N 0.70805°W	—	17th century	A cruck-framed house, rebuilt in stone in 1699, and later extended and converted for agricultural use. It is in rust-coloured and grey sandstone, and the roof has been replaced, the gables are in stone with kneelers. The main doorway, which has been blocked, has a chamfered surround, long-and-short jambs, and an initialled lintel. There are taking-in doors, and most of the windows are mullioned.	II
The Lord Nelson; 54.40967°N 0.73704°W	—	1678	The house, at one time a public house, in sandstone, with a pantile roof, coped gables and block kneelers. There are two storeys and a single-bay extension on the right. On the front are two doorways, the windows are irregular, and include sashes and fixed lights. At the rear is a three-light chamfered mullioned window, and an initialled datestone.	II
Hunt House Farmhouse; 54.37754°N 0.74585°W	—	1685	The farmhouse, which was remodelled in 1756 and extended in the 19th century, is in sandstone, with quoins, and a pantile roof with coped gables and shaped kneelers. There are two storeys, four bays, and a rear extension. The doorway has a quoined surround and a dated and initialled lintel. The windows on the front are mullioned, and in the rear extension are horizontally-sliding sashes.	II
Waymarker at NZ8193500431; 54.39282°N 0.73951°W	—	Late 17th or early 18th century	The waymarker is in gritstone, and consists of a squared tapering monolith about 1.3 metres (4 ft 3 in) high.	II
Waymarker at NZ8182800067; 54.38950°N 0.74154°W	—	Late 17th or early 18th century	The waymarker is in gritstone, and consists of a roughly squared monolith about 0.9 metres (2 ft 11 in) high.	II
Waymarker at SE8146599152; 54.38535°N 0.74523°W	—	Late 17th or early 18th century	The waymarker is in gritstone, and consists of a squared monolith about 1.25 metres (4 ft 1 in) high.	II
Waymarker at SE8159899598; 54.38440°N 0.74556°W	—	Late 17th or early 18th century	The waymarker is in gritstone, and consists of a roughly shaped tapering monolith about 1.1 metres (3 ft 7 in) high.	II
Partridge Hill Farmhouse; 54.39182°N 0.69743°W	—	Early 18th century	The farmhouse, later a private house, is in sandstone with quoins, and a pantile roof with coped gables and shaped kneelers. There are two storeys and three bays. Steps lead up to the doorway, and the windows are horizontally-sliding sashes. Inside, there is an inglenook fireplace with a bressummer.	II
Waymarker stones (east); 54.38815°N 0.71446°W	—	Early 18th century (probable)	A series of three waymarker stones in gritstone. They are rectangular and without an inscription.	II
Waymarker stones (west); 54.38978°N 0.72153°W	—	Early 18th century (probable)	A series of four waymarker stones in gritstone. They are rectangular and without an inscription.	II
Fir Tree; 54.40932°N 0.73687°W		1728	A farmhouse, later a private house, in sandstone with a roof partly in pantile and partly in slate, with coped gables and shaped kneelers. There are two storeys, three bays, and two lower bays to the right. In the front is a gabled timber porch, and a doorway with a quoined surround and a chamfered initialled and dated lintel. The windows are mullioned, some are original and some are replacements.	II
Old Woodbine; 54.40868°N 0.73557°W	—	Early to mid 18th century	The house is in sandstone, and has a slate roof with coped gables and block kneelers. There re two storeys and three bays, and a single-storey two-bay wing on the left. The doorway has a chamfered quoined surround. On the front are two mullioned windows and a single-light window, and at the rear are a fire window and horizontally-sliding sashes. In the wing are garage doors, and inside the house is an inglenook fireplace with a bressummer.	II
Brereton House and Brereton Cottage; 54.40043°N 0.72019°W		1740	The rebuilding of an earlier house, it was altered in 1851 and later divided into two. It has a cruck-framed core encased in sandstone, and pantile roofs with coped gables and shaped kneelers. The house on the right has two storeys and three bays. It has a moulded eaves course, and contains a doorway with a quoined and chamfered surround and an initialled and dated heavy lintel. There is one fixed-light window, and the other windows are mullioned. The cottage has one storey and an attic, and two bays. The cross-passage doorway has a quoined and chamfered surround and a lintel carved in a shallow arch. The windows are sashes, one with a dated and initialled sill. In the attic are two gabled dormers. Inside, there are pairs of upper crucks, and the house contains an inglenook fireplace.	II*
3 Brow Cottages; 54.41508°N 0.73295°W	—	18th century (probable)	The house is in sandstone, and has a pantile roof with coped gables and block kneelers. There are two storeys, two bays, and an extension on the left with a porch. On the front is a small fire window, and the other windows are sashes.	II
Brereton Corner; 54.40056°N 0.72050°W	—	18th century	The house, which was extended in the 19th century, is in sandstone, and has pantile roofs with coped gables and block kneelers. The later part has two storeys and three bays, and to the right is the gable end of the single-storey original part. The windows are a mix of casements and horizontally-sliding sashes.	II
Brookwood Farmhouse; 54.40949°N 0.73693°W	—	18th century	Farm buildings, later a farmhouse, it is in sandstone with a French tile roof. There is a single storey with four openings, consisting of a doorway, a two-light top-opening window, a four-light casement window, and, to the left, an inserted four-light mullioned window.	II
Friar House Farmhouse; 54.40651°N 0.71933°W	—	Mid 18th century	The farmhouse is in sandstone, with a raised eaves band, and a pantile roof with coped gables and block kneelers. There are two storeys and two bays, a single-storey wing on the left, and a lean-to on the right. The doorway in the wing has a plain surround. The windows are a mix, and include sashes, some with quoined surrounds, a fire window, and casements in quoined and chamfered surrounds. At the rear is a doorway with a quoined surround and a dated initialled lintel, and horizontally-sliding sashes.	II
Hawthorn Hill Farmhouse; 54.41241°N 0.71950°W	—	18th century (probable)	The farmhouse is in sandstone, and has a French tile roof with coped gables and shaped kneelers. There are two storeys and three bays, the right bay rebuilt. Above the doorway is a dated lintel, the windows are sashes, some horizontally-sliding, and over the ground floor openings are heavy lintels.	II
Manor House; 54.39512°N 0.72913°W	—	18th century	The farmhouse is in sandstone, with a blue and red pantile roof, coped gables and rounded kneelers. There are two storeys and three bays, a lower two-storey one-bay wing on the right, and a two-storey one-bay extension to the left. On the front is a doorway, and the windows on the front are casements. At the rear is an outshut containing a double-chamfered window with a quoined surround.	II
Farm buildings north of Partridge Hill Farmhouse; 54.39198°N 0.69757°W	—	18th century	A range of farm buildings in sandstone, with pantile roofs and coped gables. It consists of a barn with a loft, to the left is a single-storey stable and cart shed, and to the right is a range of byres or loose boxes. They contain stable doors and fixed lights, and on the barn is a wrought iron weathervane.	II
Farm buildings west of Partridge Hill Farmhouse; 54.39185°N 0.69776°W	—	18th century	A range of byres in sandstone, with pantile roofs and coped gables. There is one storey and five bays. It contains stable doors and fixed lights, and in the right return is a pitching opening.	II
Village Pinfold; 54.39454°N 0.72864°W		18th century or earlier	The pinfold, which was restored in 1935, is in gritstone and has a square plan. It is enclosed by walls about 1.3 metres (4 ft 3 in) high with flat coping. On the east side is a gate between shaped posts, and to its left is a stone plaque with an inscription commemorating the restoration.	II
Farm building west of Hunt House Farmhouse; 54.37756°N 0.74616°W	—	c.1756 (probable)	A pigsty with a henhouse above, later used as a store, in sandstone with a pantile roof. There is one storey and a loft. On the front are two doorways, and a flight of steps with a dog kennel beneath, and on the right return are three troughs built into the wall.	II
Birch Hall Inn; 54.40881°N 0.73541°W		Mid to late 18th century	The public house and shop were extended in the 19th century. They are in sandstone, the original part rendered, and have pantile roofs, the extension roof hipped. The original part has two storeys and three bays, and the extension is taller, with three storeys and one bay. Both parts have paired doorways in the centre and sash windows, and there are shop windows in the extension.	II
1 and 2 Brow Cottages; 54.41480°N 0.73271°W		Late 18th century (probable)	A farmhouse, later two houses and an outbuilding, in sandstone with an eaves band, and a pantile roof, partly re-roofed in tile, with coped gables and moulded kneelers. On the left is a block with two storeys and two bays, to its right is a taller two-storey two-bay block, and further to the right is a recessed single-storey range. On the front are two doorways, and the windows are sashes.	II
Farm buildings north of Manor House; 54.39525°N 0.72946°W	—	Late 18th century	The farm buildings are in sandstone with pantile roofs. They consist of a three-bay cowshed range, with a cart shed to the left and a lean-to, a three-bay stable range, and a two-bay pigsty block projecting on the right. There are stable doors throughout, troughs in the pigsties, coped gables and a block kneeler on the pigsty block, and a weathervane on the cart shed.	II
The White House; 54.40902°N 0.73604°W	—	Late 18th century (probable)	The house is in sandstone, and has a pantile roof with coped gables and block kneelers. There are two storeys, three bays, a porch and bay window on the left, and a single-storey extension on the right. To the right of the porch is a sash window with a bordered lintel containing a dated and initialled oval plaque. The other windows on the front are casements, and at the rear is a round-headed stair window.	II
Boundary stone (1784); 54.41142°N 0.67973°W		1784	One of a pair of boundary stones, it is in gritstone, and consists of a tapering monolith about 1.5 metres (4 ft 11 in) high. On the east face is inscribed "SNEATON L Assize 1784".	II
Boundary stone (1813); 54.41142°N 0.67973°W		1813	One of a pair of boundary stones, it is in gritstone, and consists of a round-headed monolith about 1.2 metres (3 ft 11 in) high. On the west face is inscribed "GOATHLAND BOUNDARY DETERMINED AT YORK ASSIZES 1813".	II
Rose Cottage and outbuilding 54.39961°N 0.72197°W		Early 19th century	The house and outbuilding are in sandstone with pantile roofs. The house has two storeys and three bays, a continuous outshut, and coped gables with shaped kneelers. The central doorway has a divided fanlight, and the windows are sashes. In the right return is an outbuilding with two storeys, and a coped gable and block kneeler. It contains double garage doors and a pitching opening above.	II
Wheat Hill Cottage; 54.39756°N 0.72317°W	—	Early 19th century	The house is in sandstone, and has a pantile roof with coped gables, and block kneelers. There are two storeys and three bays, and flanking single-storey single-bay wings. On the front is a projecting porch, and the windows are sashes.	II
The Old Ticket Office; 54.40283°N 0.71904°W	—	c. 1836	A railway building for the Whitby and Pickering Railway Company, later a private house, it is in sandstone on a plinth, with overhanging eaves, and a hipped slate roof. There is one storey and three bays. The left bay is recessed, and contains a round-arched doorway. In the middle bay is a tripartite window with a segmental lintel, and the right bay contains a casement window in a round-arched opening.	II
Incline Cottage and wall 54.40736°N 0.73517°W		c. 1845	Two cottages, later combined, designed by G. T. Andrews, in sandstone, with quoins, overhanging eaves on shaped brackets, and a slate roof. There are two storeys, two bays, and a single-storey entrance bay on the left. The doorway is approached by steps, most of the windows are sashes, and in the left return is a round-headed window. In front of the house is a cast iron pump in a timber shelter, and the rear yard is enclosed by a wall with flat coping.	II
Moorgates Cattle Arch; 54.38418°N 0.70388°W	—	c. 1845	The arch was built by the York and North Midland Railway Company to allow cattle to pass under the line. It is in rusticated sandstone, and consists of a single semicircular arch of shaped voussoirs on chamfered imposts, flanked by pilaster buttresses. There is a moulded cornice under a plain parapet with shaped coping. The buttresses rise to form terminal piers. On each side are raked quadrant abutments with flat coping, ending in square piers; all the piers have shallow pyramidal caps.	II
Moorgates Cottages and walls 54.38371°N 0.70109°W		c. 1845	A pair of cottages designed by G. T. Andrews for the York and North Midland Railway Company for level crossing keepers. They are in sandstone with quoins, and a slate roof with overhanging eaves. There are two storeys at the front, one storey under a catslide roof at the rear, and two bays. Each cottage has a gabled timber porch. The windows are casements with quoined and chamfered surrounds and chamfered mullions, and in the upper floor they are in half-dormers. The openings in the ground floor have pointed relieving arches. At the rear are yard walls with shaped coping.	II
Bridge over the Eller Beck; 54.40896°N 0.73566°W		19th century	The bridge carries Beck Hole Road over the stream. It is in rusticated sandstone, and consists of two semicircular arches of voussoirs with cutwaters. The bridge has a moulded band, and a slightly raked parapet with cambered coping, and at the ends are pilaster piers with flat caps.	II
Bridge No. 31 and walls, North Yorkshire Moors Railway; 54.40833°N 0.72570°W	—	c. 1860	The bridge was built for the North Eastern Railway Company to carry its line over Eller Beck. It is in sandstone, and consists of a semicircular skew arch with shaped voussoirs and imposts. The bridge has a moulded cornice, and a plain parapet with sloped coping, and cast iron railings. At the ends are piers with shallow pyramidal caps, and the curving abutments form retaining walls.	II
Bridge No. 32, North Yorkshire Moors Railway; 54.40840°N 0.72711°W	—	c. 1860	The bridge was built for the North Eastern Railway Company to carry its line over Eller Beck. It is in sandstone, and consists of three semicircular arches of shaped voussoirs on tall piers, with imposts and rounded cutwaters. The bridge has a moulded cornice, and a plain parapet with sloped coping, and cast iron railings. At the ends are piers with shallow pyramidal caps.	II
Goathland station 54.40076°N 0.71237°W		c. 1865	The station was built for the North Eastern Railway Company, and its buildings are in sandstone with slate roofs. They consist of a two-storey three-bay station house with a single-storey single-bay wing on the left, and to the right is a single-storey range consisting of a ticket office, a screen wall and a weigh-house. The house has a chamfered eaves band, a cornice, and a hipped roof with crow-stepped gables and large kneelers. It contains a double doorway, a canted bay window, and sash windows. At the rear of the weigh-house are horizontally-sliding sashes. All the openings have rusticated lintels.	II
Goods shed, Goathland station 54.40044°N 0.71228°W	—	c. 1865	The goods shed was built for the North Eastern Railway Company. It is in sandstone and has a slate roof with overhanging eaves, a single storey and three bays. In the centre are double doors in a segmental arch of voussoirs, with a canopy, and flanked by sash windows with rusticated lintels. In the returns are full-height round-headed arches, that in the left return blocked.	II
Lime and coal cells, Goathland station 54.40060°N 0.71228°W		c. 1865	The lime and coal cells were built for the North Eastern Railway Company, and are attached to the south end of the station building. They are in sandstone, and have five bays, the two bays at the north covered by a shed with a slate hipped roof.	II
Water column, Goathland station 54.40093°N 0.71239°W		c. 1865	The water column was built for the North Eastern Railway Company, and is in painted cast iron. It consists of a tall cylindrical column with a ball finial, and a swan-necked cross-piece forming the spout. Alongside is a drip cup on a tall cylindrical post.	II
Workshop and water tank Goathland station 54.39989°N 0.71145°W		c. 1865	The workshop with a water tank above were built for the North Eastern Railway Company. The workshop is in sandstone, and contains a doorway and windows with segmental-arched heads. Above it is a moulded cornice, and a cast iron water tank with cross-braced panels.	II
Mallyan Spout Hotel; 54.39551°N 0.72727°W		1892	The hotel was designed by Walter Brierley and altered in 1932–35. It is in sandstone, the extension is in red brick fronted in sandstone, and it has overhanging bracketed eaves, and tile roofs with coped gables and raised kneelers. There are two storeys and four bays, with attics over the middle two bays. The porch has an elliptical-arched doorway with a chamfered surround, spandrels with a monogram and the date, and a hood mould. The windows are mullioned, to the left is a two-storey canted bay window with a cornice, the ground floor windows with transomed, and in the attic are gabled half-dormers. The extensions have similar features.	II
St Mary's Church, steps and handrail 54.39508°N 0.72677°W		1892–94	The church, designed by Walter Brierley, is in sandstone with a stone slate roof. It consists of a nave, a south porch, a choir, a south organ chamber and a vestry under a central tower, and a chancel. The tower has three stages, angle buttresses, and a southwest stair turret. On the south front is a doorway with a pointed arch and a three-light square-headed window, and on the north front is a three-light round-headed window with a hood mould. The bell openings have one or two lights, on the north and south fronts are clock faces, and at the top is a plain parapet with moulded coping, and a weathervane. The porch is approached by steps with a wrought iron handrail.	II*
Nesfield and Mulgrave Cottage; 54.39996°N 0.72184°W	—	c. 1896	Two houses designed by Walter Brierley, they are in sandstone with pantile roofs, coped gables and raised kneelers. Each house has two storeys and three bays. Mulgrave Cottage at the right is slightly lower, and the two houses mirror each other. Each house has a doorway with a bracketed flat hood, and the windows are casements.	II
Footbridge, Goathland station 54.40046°N 0.71205°W		c. 1900	The footbridge crossing the line was built for the North Eastern Railway Company. It has a painted cast iron frame and timber steps and decking. The footbridge consists of an elliptical arch on open square piers with round arches and decorated spandrels. Steps on the sides lead up to a flat central walkway. The railings are horizontal with diagonal-cross bracing.	II
Brereton Lodge; 54.40080°N 0.71926°W	—	1902	The house, designed by Walter Brierley, is in sandstone, with quoins, and a stone slate roof with gables and plain bargeboards. It consists of four ranges around a courtyard, and has two storeys The windows are chamfered and mullioned, containing casements, coped gables and raised kneelers. e ground floor windows have hood moulds. The south front has four bays, the left bay projecting and gabled, its upper floor jettied on corbels. On the west front is a projecting porch, its upper floor jettied on corbels.	II
Goathland War Memorial; 54.40029°N 0.72054°W		c. 1920	The war memorial stands in a green area near a road junction. It consists of a sandstone cross on a rectangular tapering pedestal on a square limestone base. The head is in the form of a Greek cross, and the shaft tapers. On the pedestal is an inscription, and contains the names of those lost in the World Wars.	II
