= Grosmont Bridge =

Bridge in Grosmont, North Yorkshire, England

Coordinates: 54°26′15″N 0°43′51″W

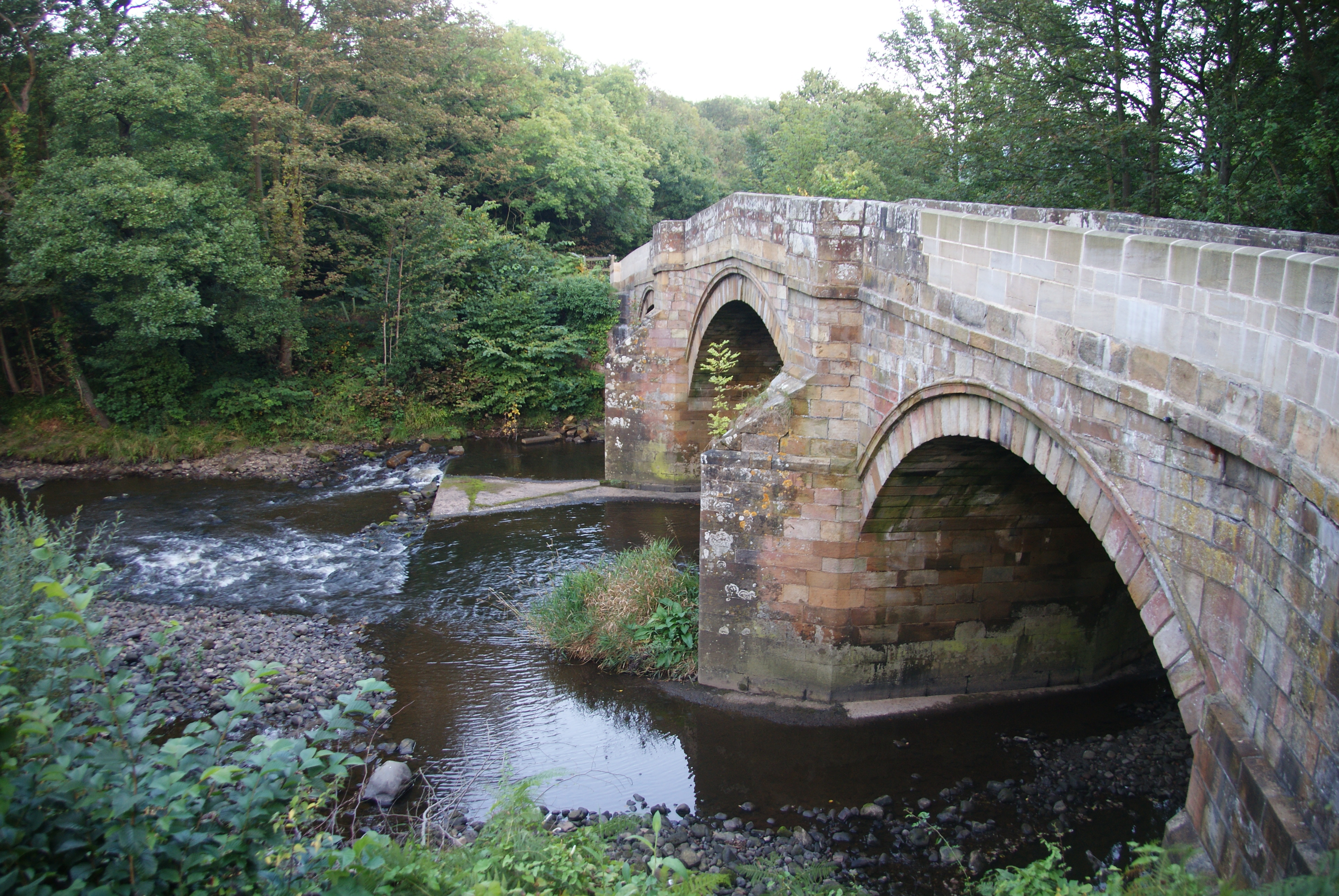
The bridge, in 2014

Grosmont Bridge is a historic bridge in Grosmont, North Yorkshire, a village in England.

The bridge spans the River Esk, connecting Grosmont with Egton. There was a bridge on the site by the 17th century, but the current structure dates from the 18th century. In 2024, a bus crashed through the parapet and fell into the river, leading the bridge to close for two months, and vehicles having to take a 16-mile diversion. The bridge has been grade II listed since 1989.

The bridge is built of sandstone, and consists of three semicircular arches. The bridge has voussoirs, hood moulds, and shouldered cutwaters rising to pilaster buttresses forming pedestrian refuges. The parapet is raked, with cambered coping, beneath it is a raised band, and the parapets end in square piers with flat caps.

== See also ==
- Listed buildings in Grosmont, North Yorkshire
