= Grosmont Tunnel =

Railway tunnel in North Yorkshire, England

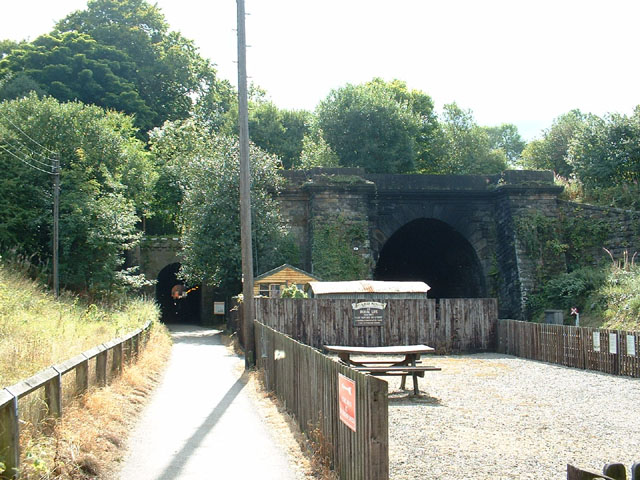
- The tunnels at Grosmont Station; the original tunnel is on the left
- Interactive map of Grosmont Tunnel

Overview
- Line: North York Moors Railway
- Location: Grosmont, North Yorkshire, England
- Coordinates: 54.434°N 0.724°W
- Status: Heritage
- Start: 1834
- End: 1835

Operation
- Opened: 1835
- Rebuilt: 1845

The Grosmont Tunnels are two separate railway tunnels adjoining each other in the village of Grosmont, North Yorkshire, England. The first tunnel was built in 1835 and has now become a pedestrian route through to the North York Moors Railway (NYMR) engine sheds on the south side of the hill.

The original tunnel was superseded by a new bore in the 1840s that was sited immediately west of the old tunnel. The 1830s tunnel is now the only original structure built by the Whitby & Pickering Railway (W&P) that is under the care of the NYMR.

== History ==
The first tunnel was started in 1834 and completed in 1835. It was located on the initial stretch of the horse operated W&P which had reached a point that was known as just 'Tunnel', which became known as Grosmont by 1894. (Note: The village name was taken from the Grandmontine priory that was located near to the village that was known as Growmond. The monks who founded the priory who had come from Grandimont in Normandy.) Initially, services only ran between Whitby and Grosmont (Tunnel) as the tunnel was still being constructed when the horse tramway opened. The Tunnel Inn was built in the village to accommodate passengers (though the grade II listed building is now known by the name of The Station Tavern and is one of the first permanent surviving structures built by the Whitby & Pickering Railway). Not many of the structures from the original Whitby & Pickering Railway exist, and the Horse Tunnel is the only one which is maintained by the NYMR.

The first tunnel, which is 120 yards (110 m) long, is sometimes referred to as the Grosmont Old Tunnel or as the Horse Tunnel as the initial railway was a horse operated tramway. Both bores tunnel under Lease Rigg, a hill just south of Grosmont which when the first tunnel was excavated, was found to contain iron ore. Various kilns sprung up in the area to exploit the mineral commercially.

The Horse Tunnel is castellated at its northern portal but plainer at the southern end. In his book, The North Yorkshire Moors Railway, Michael Vanns states that in the early days of railway building, such castellations were significant of the railway company's individuality and also to assure passengers of the safety of the structure they were about to enter. The Horse Tunnel is believed to have been designed and built by George Stephenson, who was the overall engineer for the whole route from Whitby to Pickering. Because of its early construction date, it is reputed to be the oldest castellated tunnel in England and also one of the oldest passenger railway tunnels in England.

When the railway was upgraded to steam locomotion in the 1840s by the York and North Midland Railway (Y&NMR), the Horse Tunnel was not big enough to accommodate trains, so a longer tunnel, 146 yards (134 m) long, was constructed to the west and was double track throughout. The original tunnel was retained to allow access to the workman's cottages on the south side of the tunnel. It was designed by John Cass Birkenshaw (the then architect for the Y&NMR), was grade II listed in 1989 and is still used by trains on the NYMR.

When the railway was re-opened as a heritage concern in 1973, the Horse Tunnel was used as an access point to the NYMR engine sheds which are located at the southern portal of both tunnels. The Horse Tunnel is now grade II* listed and is still in use as a thoroughfare to allow visitors to the NYMR access to viewing areas around the engine sheds. In the 2016 autumn gala on the NYMR, temporary track was laid through the tunnel to a 2 ft (610 mm) gauge, thereby allowing steam trains to work through the Horse Tunnel for the first time in its 180-year history.

== See also ==
- Grade II* listed buildings in North Yorkshire (district)
- Listed buildings in Grosmont, North Yorkshire
