= Goathland =

Village and civil parish in North Yorkshire, England

Coordinates: 54°24′00″N 0°43′12″W

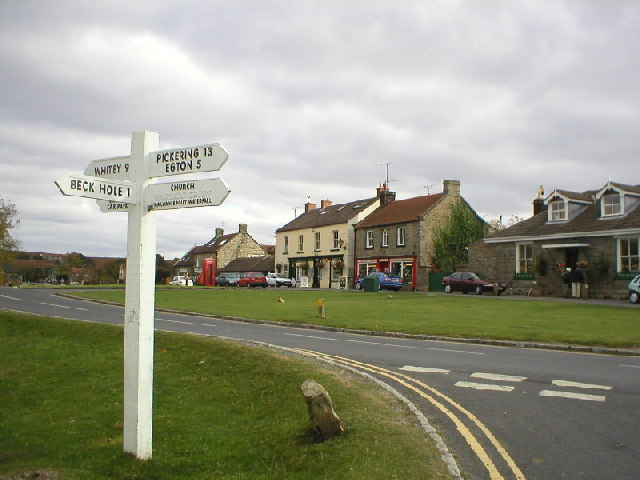
- Goathland village

- Location within North Yorkshire
- Population: 438 (2011 census)
- OS grid reference: NZ831012
- Civil parish: Goathland
- Unitary authority: North Yorkshire
- Ceremonial county: North Yorkshire
- Region: Yorkshire and the Humber
- Country: England
- Sovereign state: United Kingdom
- Post town: WHITBY
- Postcode district: YO22
- Police: North Yorkshire
- Fire: North Yorkshire
- Ambulance: Yorkshire
- UK Parliament: Scarborough and Whitby

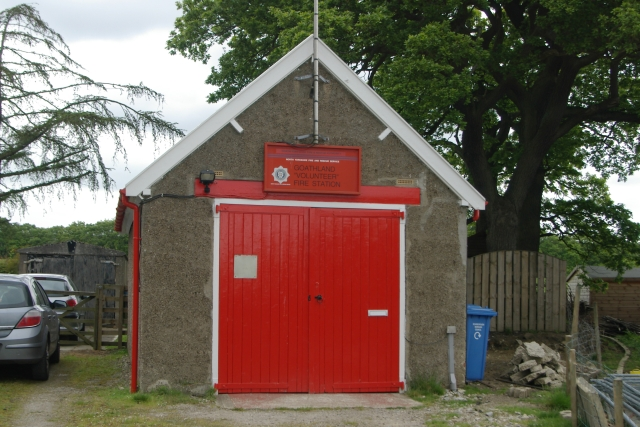
Goathland volunteer fire station

Goathland is a village and civil parish in the county of North Yorkshire, England. Historically part of the North Riding of Yorkshire, it is in the North York Moors national park due north of Pickering, off the A169 to Whitby. It has a station on the steam-operated North Yorkshire Moors Railway line.

In 2015, it had an estimated population of 430.

From 1974 to 2023 it was part of the Borough of Scarborough. It is now administered by the unitary North Yorkshire Council.

== History ==
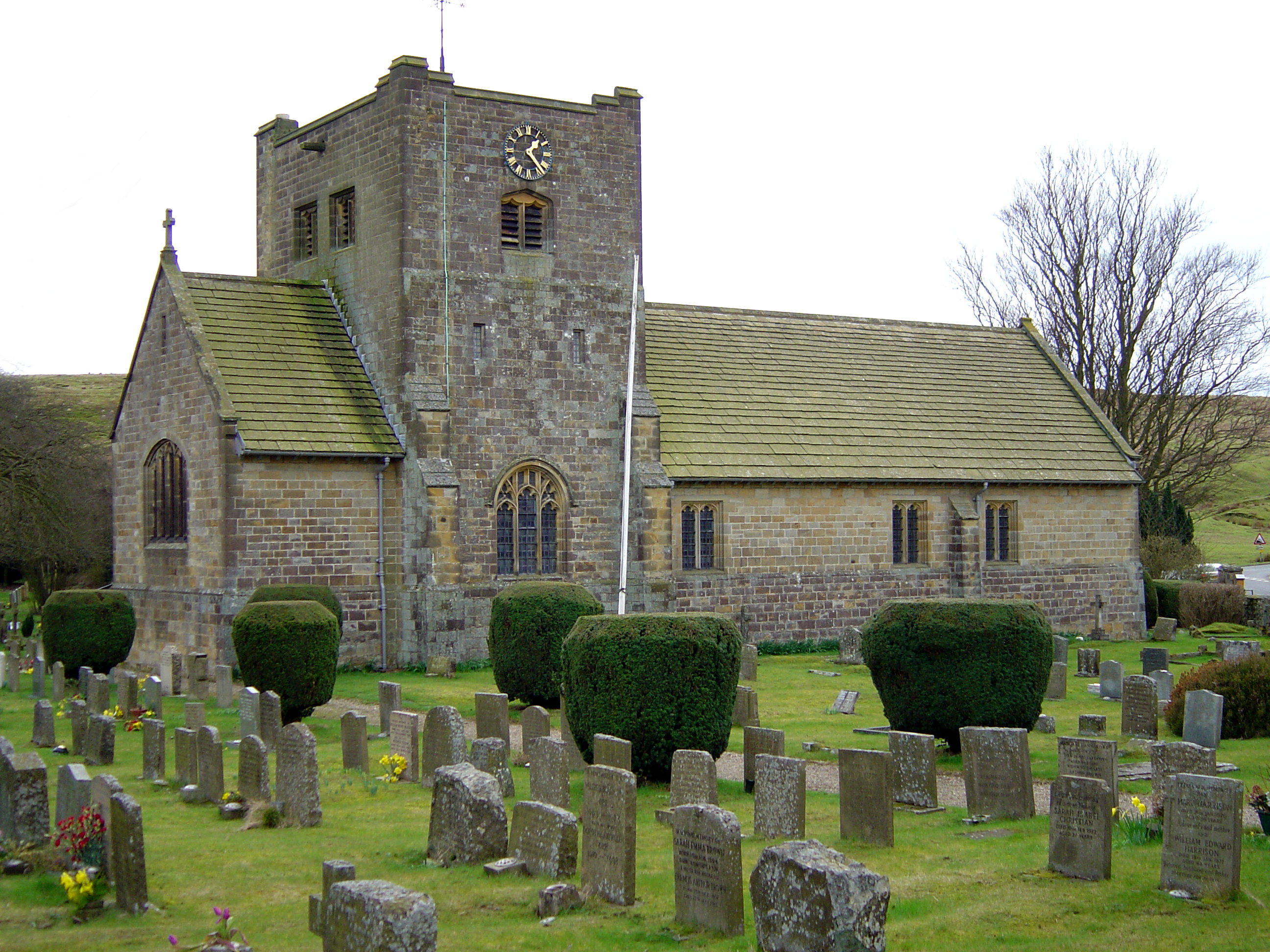
St Mary's Anglican church, Goathland

Goathland village is 486 feet (148 m) above sea level and has a recorded history dating back to just after the Norman Conquest, though the settlement was not mentioned in the Domesday Book. The name Goathland is probably a corruption of 'good land'; alternatively it may come from 'Goda's land', Goda being an Old English personal name. In 1109 King Henry I granted land to Osmund the Priest and the brethren of the hermitage of Goathland, then called Godelandia, for the soul of his mother, Queen Matilda, who had died in 1083. This is recorded in a charter held at Whitby Abbey.

Goathland was a comparatively remote parish in the 16th century, and Elizabethan recusant Catholics were able to find safety with Mary Harding at Hunt Hall on Wheeldale Moor. The village was a spa town in the 19th century.

There are several hotels and guest houses in the village. The largest, the Mallyan Spout Hotel, is named after a nearby waterfall. There is a caravan site, reached by driving along the track that was the route of the railway from 1835 to 1860. The route of the original railway passed by the Goathland Hotel, which acted as a local transport hub until the railway was shifted further east to the newer Goathland station.

Much of the surrounding land is owned by the Duchy of Lancaster. The Duchy's tenants have a common right extending back for hundreds of years to graze their black faced sheep on the village green and surrounding moorland.

St Mary's Church, grade II* listed from 1969, was built between 1894 and 1896. However, a chapel existed in Goathland since at least 1521, being supplanted by a church in 1821. Stone and other materials from the 1821 church were re-used for other buildings in the village. At that time, dressed stone was quarried locally and was in short supply, this being 15 years before the railway arrived in the village. The war memorial, made from sandstone and modelled on the nearby Lilla Cross, is located on the village green. It was grade II listed in November 2021. The Lilla Cross is 5 miles (8 km) to the east and is a waymarker point on Fylingdales Moor.

The village has a primary school, with a capacity of 49 pupils. The school was rated as good by Ofsted in 2013. The village had a library until 1966, and this was resurrected as a volunteer library and community hub in 2019, which is run from the village hall.

Goathland Fire Station, staffed by volunteers, is noted for being the "world's smallest", and houses a custom-built fire engine, based on a Land Rover.

== Activities ==
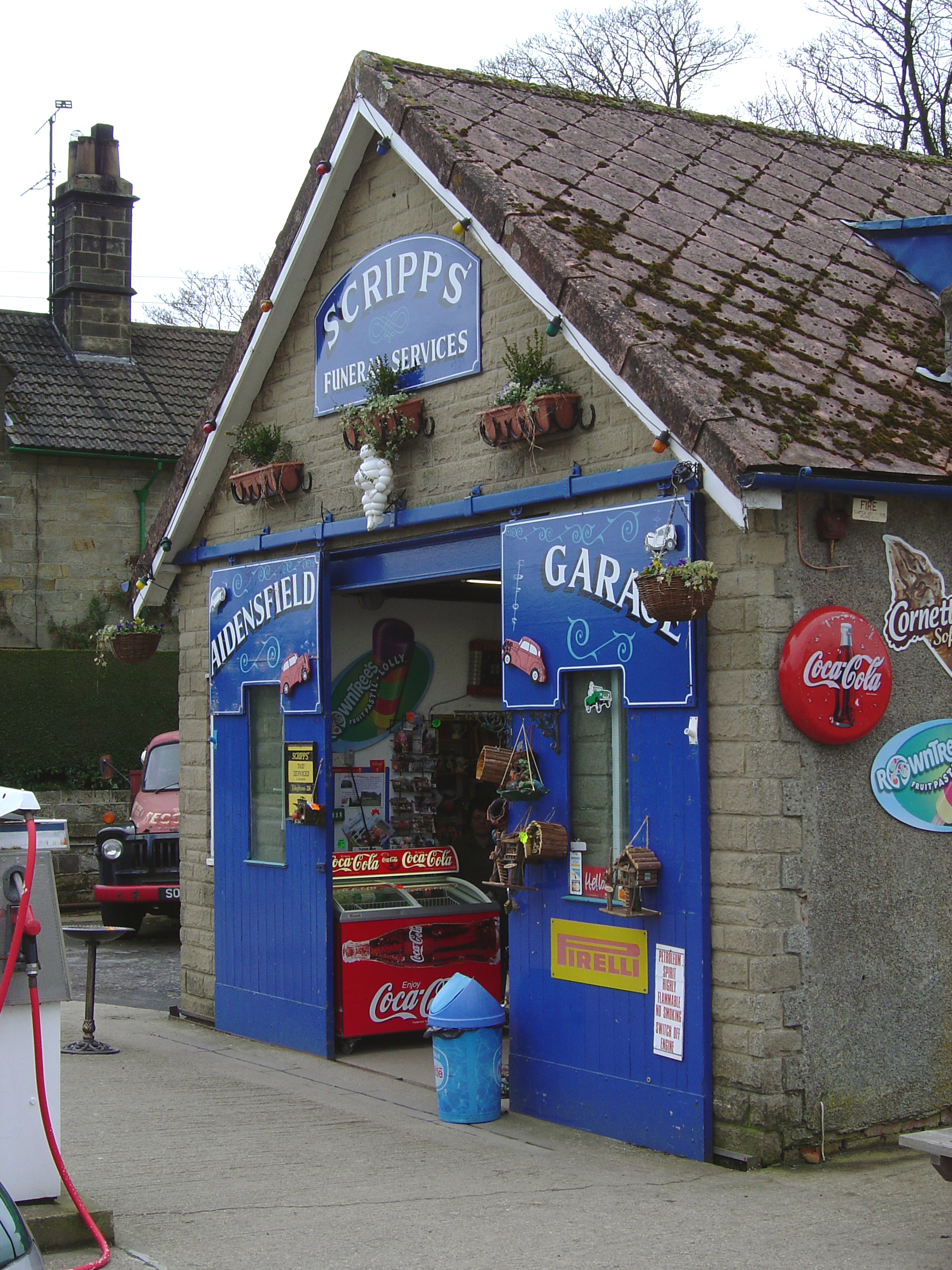
Scripps' Funeral Services and petrol station, seen on Heartbeat

The Goathland Plough Stots, a troop which performs a Long Sword dance, are based in the village. Every Plough Monday, the Plough Stots perform in the village and surrounding area raising money for local hospitals. A farmers' market is held on the third Saturday of each month between March and December.

== Transport ==
The first railway station in Goathland was located at the top of an incline. The station, Goathland Bank Top, was located in the village, and the carriages were drawn up the incline by the use of a rope-worked drum system. This railway station closed in 1865 when a newer one opened on a diversionary line to Grosmont. This closed to regular passenger traffic in 1965, and was re-opened as part of the North Yorkshire Moors Railway in 1973. The village is 1.2 miles (2 km) west of the A169 road, and is served by four buses a day as part of the Yorkshire Coastliner service between Leeds and Whitby.

=== North Yorkshire Moors Railway ===
Goathland railway station is on the North Yorkshire Moors Railway. The railway is run by a charitable trust with some paid staff but is mostly operated by volunteers and runs nearly all year including Christmas. It carries more than 250,000 passengers a year and is the second-longest preserved line in Britain. It links Grosmont in the north with Pickering in the south along the route of the Whitby - Pickering line built by George Stephenson in 1835 and upgraded in 1865. From 2007 some trains on the railway were timetabled to run to Whitby and in March 2014 work began in Whitby station to replace a platform and allow more North Yorkshire Moors Railway services to be timetabled between Whitby and Pickering.

Goathland railway station was used as the location for Hogsmeade railway station in the Harry Potter films and the line filmed for Harry's journey. It was also used in the 1995 film Carrington.

== Fictional connections ==
The village was the setting of the fictional village of Aidensfield in the Heartbeat television series set in the 1960s. Many landmarks from the series are recognisable, including the shop, garage/funeral directors, the public house and the railway station. The pub is called the Goathland Hotel but in the series is The Aidensfield Arms. After interior shots were filmed in the hotel for some years, a replica of it was built in Yorkshire TV's Leeds studio.

As well as serving as the location for the fictional village of Aidensfield, Goathland features in its own right as the setting for the denouement of Dan Chapman's 2014 dystopian thriller Closed Circuit. It is explained that the antagonist owns the entire village and the nearby MoD site serves as a base for his operations.

Goathland is a location in Ice (2009), a novel by Australian writer Louis Nowra (Allen & Unwin, 2008).

Malcolm Saville's children's novel Mystery Mine is set in an area south-west of Whitby on the north-east Yorkshire moors close to and around a village called Goathland. The book contains two maps showing the layout of a partly fictional geography of the area in which the book is set but Goathland, Wheeldale Moor and the Roman Road referred to in the book correspond to the real locations in this area south of Eskdale.

== Sport ==
Goathland Cricket Club has a history dating back to 1874, when it was known as the 'Vale of Goathland Cricket Club'. The club moved to their current ground on Centenary Cricket Field in 1876. Goathland have two senior teams: a Saturday 1st XI that compete in the Scarborough Beckett Cricket League and a Midweek Senior XI in the Esk Valley Evening League.

== See also ==
- Listed buildings in Goathland
