= Grosmont, North Yorkshire =

Village and civil parish in North Yorkshire, England

Grosmont
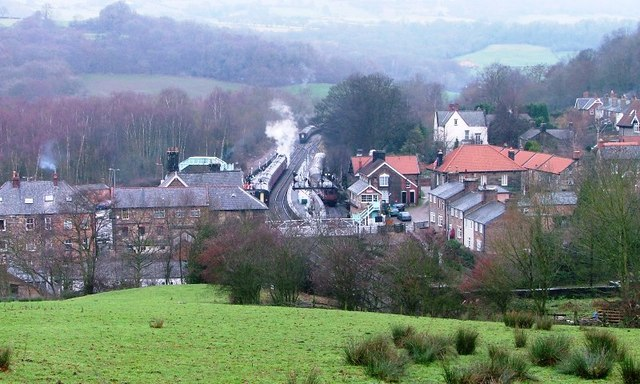
- View of Grosmont from the south

- Location within North Yorkshire
- Population: 318 (2011 census)
- OS grid reference: NZ828052
  - London: 200 mi (320 km) S
- Civil parish: Grosmont
- Unitary authority: North Yorkshire
- Ceremonial county: North Yorkshire
- Region: Yorkshire and the Humber
- Country: England
- Sovereign state: United Kingdom
- Post town: WHITBY
- Postcode district: YO22
- Dialling code: 01947
- Police: North Yorkshire
- Fire: North Yorkshire
- Ambulance: Yorkshire
- UK Parliament: Scarborough and Whitby

Grosmont (/ˈɡroʊmɒnt/ GROH-mont; archaically spelt Growmond) is a village and civil parish situated in Eskdale in the North York Moors National Park, within the boundaries of the county of North Yorkshire, England. From 1974 to 2023 it was part of the Borough of Scarborough; it is now administered by the unitary North Yorkshire Council.

Grosmont Priory was established in the 12th century and closed during the dissolution of the monasteries in the 16th century. The village was established in the 1830s when the Whitby to Pickering Railway was built, and grew as a result of industrial iron ore extraction, and in the 1860s the development of an ironworks led to further growth. Up to at least the 1850s the village was known as Tunnel.

== History ==
The River Esk at Grosmont, west of the priory, was the crossing place of the ancient structure known as Wade's Causeway.

A priory was established in the early 13th century, but no major settlements existed until the Industrial Revolution (1830s) when the arrival of railways and demand for iron led to the creation of a new village "Tunnel" later named Grosmont, and to the establishment of an iron works.

Before the industrial period there is evidence of iron ore extraction and iron working in the parish: a 15th/16th century ironworking site has been identified on the banks of the Esk close to the priory; (Note: 54.440349°N 0.725402°W, 15th/16th century ironworking site) and a late or post-medieval iron forge existed in Smithy Holme Wood less than 0.3 miles (0.5 km) south-east of the present village; (Note: 54.433610°N 0.722113°W, Iron working site, Smithy Holme Wood) and a post-medieval pit for ironstone extraction was located less than 0.6 miles (1 km) east of the village; (Note: 54.434902°N 0.715026°W, Post medieval ironstone extraction pit) alum extraction and refining is known to have taken place near to the site of St Matthew's church. (Note: 54.435037°N 0.724081°W, Allum garth, former Alum production site)

=== Grosmont Priory ===
Grosmont Priory was a Grandmontine religious house, one of three in England. (Note: Two other Grandmontine priories existed in England, Craswall Priory and Alberbury Priory.)

It was established around 1200 when Joan Fossard and her husband gifted about 200 acres (80 ha) of land in the Forest of Egton (Eskdale) to the order. A fire destroyed most of the priory in 1360. In 1394 the Abbot of Grandimont gained permission to sell the priory, which was acquired by John Hewitt. (Note: As a result of the disconnection from the French parent order of Grandmontines, the priory was not suppressed as a result of the Suppression of Heresy Act 1414.) The priory continued until the dissolution of the monasteries in the 1530s. At the time of dissolution the priory had four priors and a net income of £12 2s 8d per year; its buildings included a church with a bell tower, chapter house, kitchen and lodgings. The priory was located on the banks of the Esk. (Note: 54.440541°N 0.724577°W, Grosmont Priory (site of))

An unrelated chapel on the banks of the Esk about 0.6 miles (1 km) south-west of the priory was dedicated to St Leonard or St Lawrence and possibly connected with the Abbey of Melsa. (Note: 54.436332°N 0.736562°W, former Chapel site, St Leonard or St Lawrence)

=== Tunnel, or Grosmont village ===
In May 1835 a daily service began on the partially completed line between Whitby and the Tunnel Inn in Grosmont. The railway company constructed the village inn and post office (1835/6).

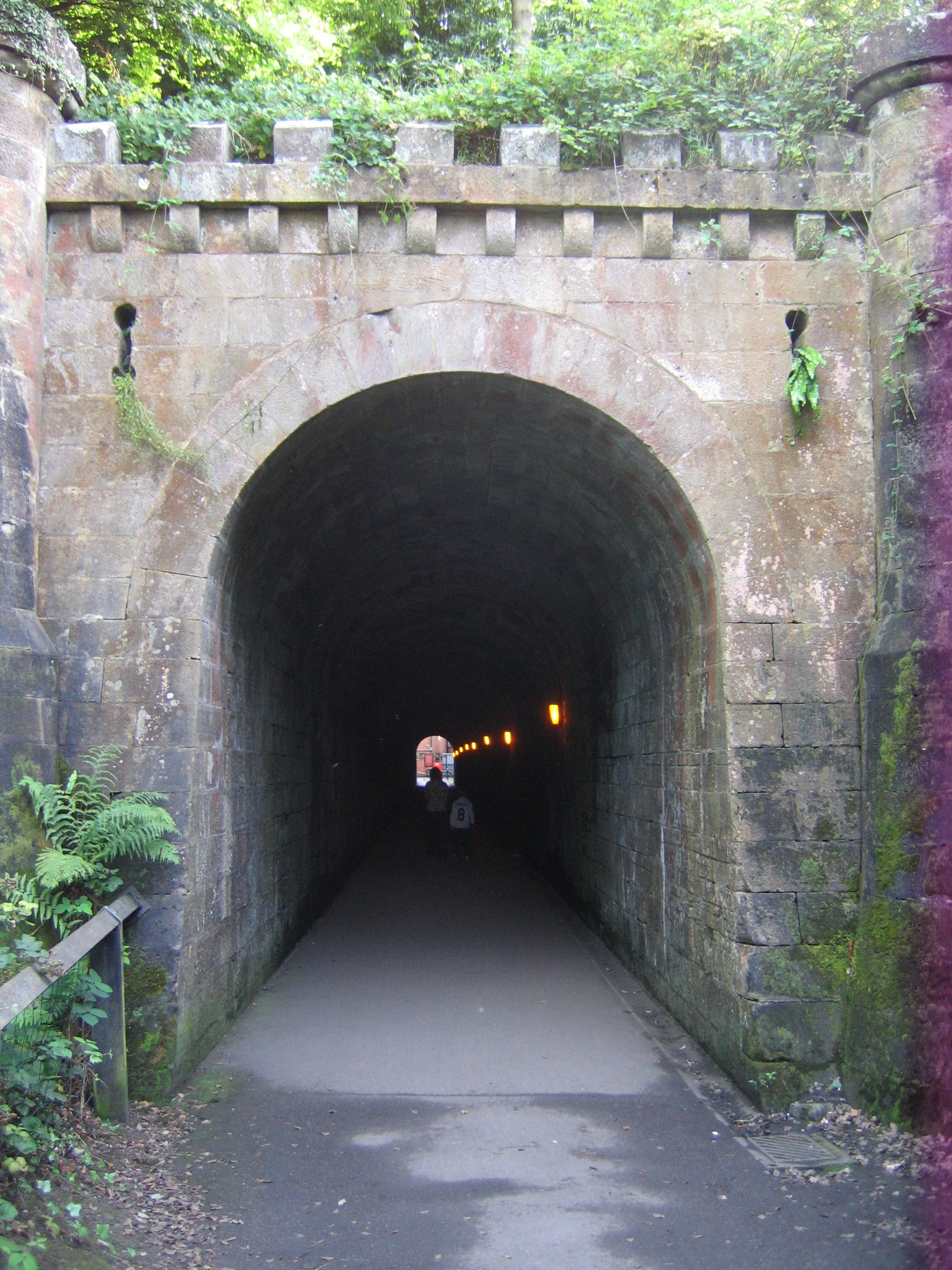
1836, W&PR horse railway tunnel

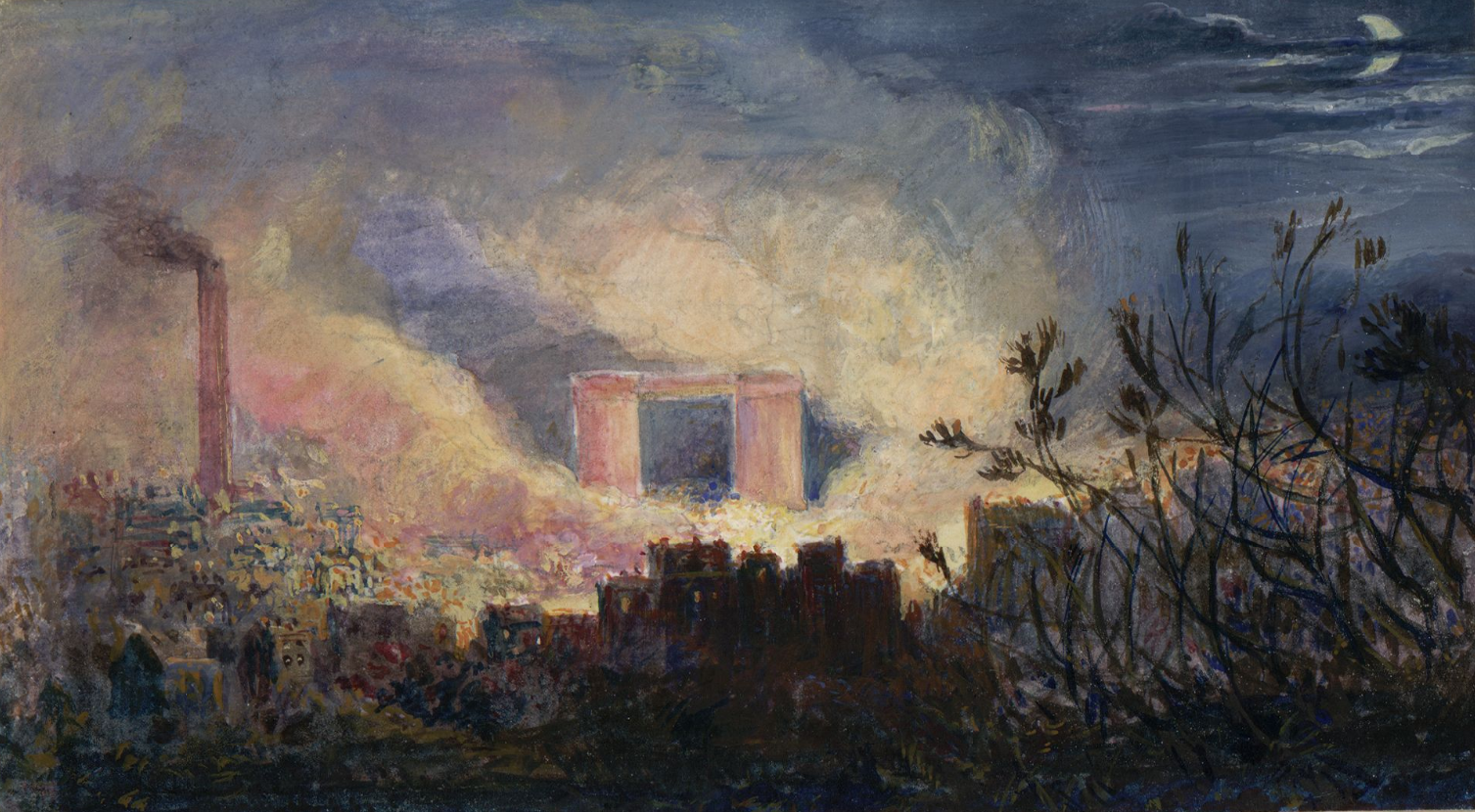
Grosmonts furnaces by night, 7 October 1865

The opening of the railway in 1836 brought industrial development: four lime kilns were constructed by the Whitby and Grosmont Lime Company, supplied with stone from Pickering; and the Whitby Stone company exported ironstone mined in the Grosmont area and building stone. The first recipient of ore from Grosmont was the Birtley Iron Company in 1836.

Growth of Grosmont around the railway, river bridge and the 'Tunnel Inn' was observed by Henry Belcher in 1836:

Near Growmond Abbey farm the railway crosses the river Esk for the last time by a bridge, which in point of romantic character is surpassed by none of the preceding ones, and approaches the Tunnel Inn, which is so situated as to command much beautiful scenery, and to possess numerous advantages in the way of business, arising from its contiguity both to the railway and a public road.—Besides this Inn, several cottages, workshops, and a warehouse have been erected within the last two years, and limekilns are at this time being built at no great distance, the whole bidding fair to form the nucleus of a village, that from the great facilities which the situation affords for speculation in a variety of ways, will most probably spring up in the neighbourhood.

— H. Belcher, Illustrations of the scenery...

The village was known as "Tunnel" early in its history.

In 1839 a second iron mine was begun by Mr Berwick on behalf of the landowner, Mrs Clark. Competition from Scottish black band ironstone resulted in a loss of trade for the mines in 1842/3. An increase in demand for ore in the mid-1840s led to the Grosmont mines becoming active again. A contract from Bolckow and Vaughan for 36,000 tons over three years was made in 1846. The area became an important supplier of iron stone; supplying one third of the ironworks in northern eastern England by 1848. Discovery of large deposits of ore in north Cleveland in 1850 closer to the consumers reduced demand for ore from south Cleveland.

Henry Belcher raised funds to construct St Matthew's Church, Grosmont which was established in 1842 at a cost of £1,260. The York and North Midland Railway acquired the line in the 1840s and made improvements; at Grosmont a stone bridge, a new tunnel and a railway station were constructed. By 1859 Grosmont had developed into a small town, with a Literary Institute and a National School.

By 1861 three ironstone mines, Whitby Stone Co, Birtley Iron Co, and Mrs Clarks' mine, were extracting 30,000, 10,000 and 30,000 tons of ore respectively per annum. In 1862 Charles and Thomas Bagnall started an ironworks, 'Grosmont Works' and two blast furnaces were built by 1863. The furnaces were 18 ft (5.5 m) diameter, 63 ft (19 m) high, each with a production capacity of 250 tons per week. Furnace gas was extracted by a refractory lined iron tube built into the top ('throat') of the furnace – the gas was used to heat boilers, and hot blast stoves. The site was connected to the railway by a siding. (Note: 54.437027°N 0.726002°W, Grosmont Iron Works (site of)) The Bagnalls acquired the land containing the Whitby Stone Company's mines to secure its supply of ore, and built back to back cottages for their workers in the village. Mrs Clark's mines were acquired in 1864.

In 1865 a railway connection at Grosmont westwards to Castleton was opened, completing a connection from Whitby to the north-east ports.

=== Grosmont ironworks ===
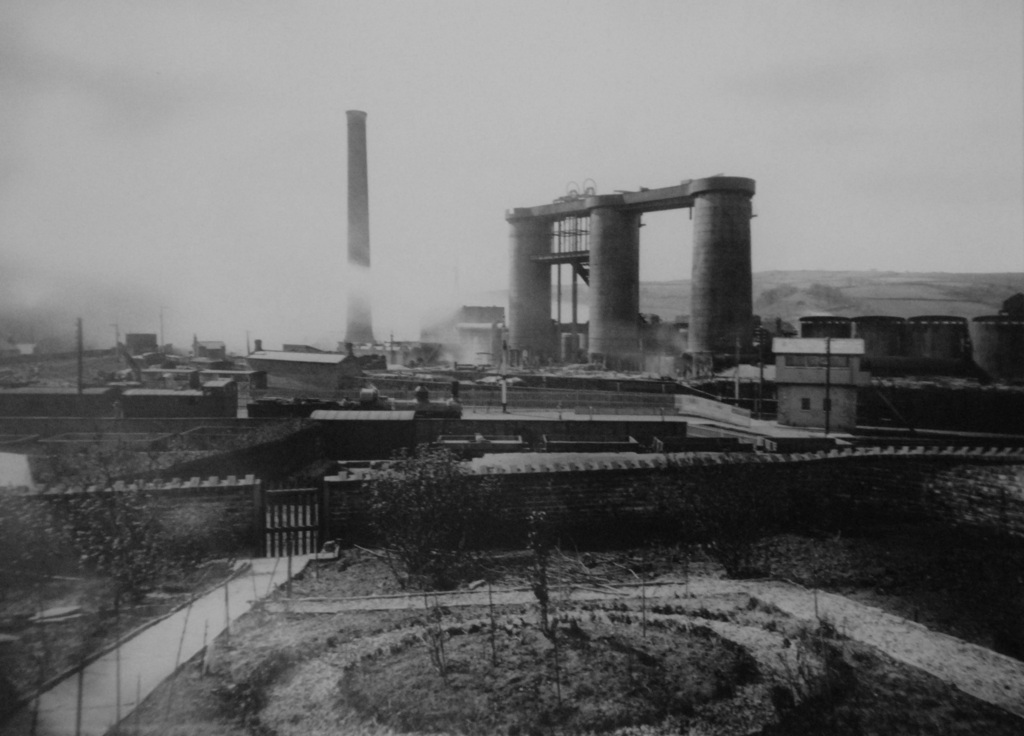
Grosmont Iron Works, c. 1880, view westward over railway station

The ironworks employed about 500 people and produced about 40,000 tons of iron at its peak between 1865 and 1875. A brickworks was established in 1870, east of the railway line and ironworks, and north of the village. (Note: 54.438348°N 0.723422°W, Former brick and tile works) The village population reached a peak of 1600 in 1880; a village co-operative society and Methodist church were founded in 1867, a Working Men's Institute was established in 1871, the church of St Matthew was rebuilt and enlarged in the decade after 1875.

A third blast furnace was constructed and began production in 1876. Several negative factors affected the works after the mid-1870s: a drop in iron prices of 75% in the late 1870s; difficulty in obtaining coal during a strike in the Durham Coalfield around 1879, and industrial problems at the works in 1880. The works closed in 1891, and were offered for sale and the buildings demolished in the early 1890s. As a result of its closure, the village population dropped to 872 by 1901. The works produced an estimated one million tons of slag. After closure the slag heaps were reprocessed to make road stone, and slag wool; reprocessing continued until at least the early 1930s. The brickworks expanded during the first decades of the 20th century: its 390-foot (120 m) chimney was built in 1902; and a Hoffmann kiln was constructed in 1923; the brickworks operated until 1957.

Excluding the building of Ings Terrace in the post Second World War period, there has been no urban expansion of the village since the 19th century. In 1963 the railway line to Pickering closed but was reopened by volunteers as the North Yorkshire Moors Railway in 1973.

== Geography ==
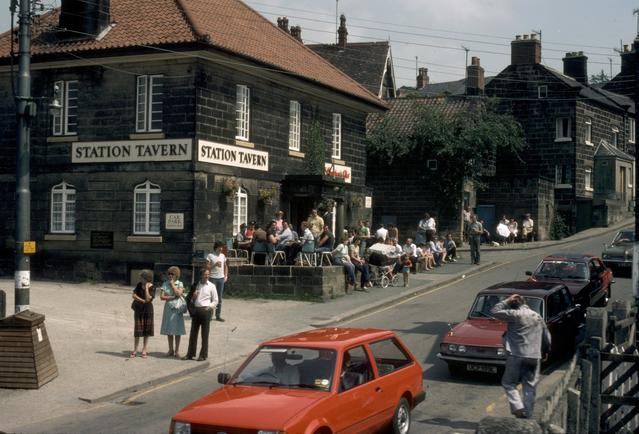
"Railway Tavern", former 'Tunnel Inn', Grosmont village (1982)

The parish of Grosmont is located in the valley of the River Esk, near its confluence with the Murk Esk. Excluding farms, the village is the only habitation in the parish. According to the 2011 UK census, the parish had a population of 318, a reduction on the 2001 UK census figure of 335. Several of the road access routes have steep gradients. The village is on National Rail's Esk Valley Line served by Grosmont railway station, which is also used by the North Yorkshire Moors Railway (NYMR), forming the northern terminus of its heritage railway to Pickering.

=== Landmarks ===
Grosmont is home to the NYMR's engine shed. A number of structures in and near the village are listed, including: the three-arch sandstone Grosmont Bridge over the Esk, dating from around 1700; (Note: 54.437664°N 0.730816°W, Grosmont Bridge) the early 19th-century 'Eskdale Villa' on the eastern outskirts of the village; and in the village the 19th-century 'Rose Cottage'.

Several railway-related buildings and structures are listed, including the Station Tavern public house and outbuildings; the Post Office (c. 1835); and the former horse tramway tunnel, now a pedestrian route; all built for the Whitby and Pickering Railway in the 1830s. Also listed are the Murk Esk railway bridge (1845); (Note: 54.435390°N 0.724903°W, Murk Esk railway bridge) 1845 railway tunnel, and the G.T. Andrews-designed Grosmont Railway station (1846), (Note: 54.436076°N 0.725059°W, Grosmont railway station) all built for the York and North Midland Railway.

== Sport ==
Grosmont Cricket Club has a history of activity dating back to 1918 and the club's ground is based on Front Street, Grosmont. The club have two senior teams: a Saturday 1st XI that compete in the Scarborough Beckett Cricket League and a Midweek Senior XI in the Esk Valley Evening League.

== Notable people ==
Actor Ian Carmichael lived in the village for many years with his wife, novelist Kate Fenton.

== See also ==
- Listed buildings in Grosmont, North Yorkshire
