= Ainderby Miers with Holtby =

Civil parish in North Yorkshire, England

Coordinates: 54.333°N 1.600°W

- Civil parish
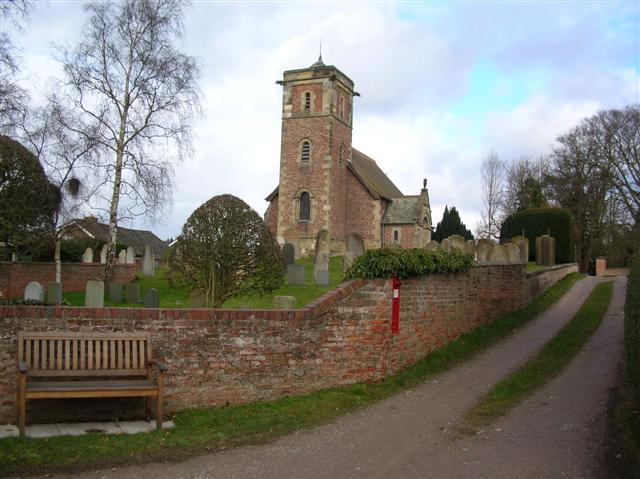
- Holtby Church

- OS grid reference: SE260931
- Civil parish: Ainderby Miers with Holtby
- Unitary authority: North Yorkshire
- Ceremonial county: North Yorkshire
- Region: Yorkshire and the Humber
- Country: England
- Sovereign state: United Kingdom
- Post town: NORTHALLERTON
- Postcode district: DL7
- Police: North Yorkshire
- Fire: North Yorkshire
- Ambulance: Yorkshire

Ainderby Miers with Holtby is a civil parish in North Yorkshire, England. The population taken at the 2011 Census was less than 100. Information is now kept with the parish of Hackforth. However, in 2015, North Yorkshire County Council estimated that the population of the parish was 20. The parish is bounded to the east by the A1(M) motorway, and is about 3 miles (5 km) south of Catterick, and 4 miles (6.4 km) north of Bedale. It includes the hamlets of Ainderby Miers and Holtby Grange.

From 1974 to 2023 it was part of the Hambleton District, it is now administered by the unitary North Yorkshire Council.

Ainderby occurs three times in the area (Ainderby Quernhow, Ainderby Steeple, and Ainderby Miers). The first part is derived from a personal name, Eindriði, and the second part denotes the area: Quernhow was where the quern-stones came from, Steeple denoted the church, and Miers denoted that the land there was boggy (a mire).

== See also ==
- Listed buildings in Ainderby Miers with Holtby
